= Phlyctis monosperma =

Scientific classification
- Domain: Eukaryota
- Kingdom: Fungi
- Division: Ascomycota
- Class: Lecanoromycetes
- Order: Gyalectales
- Family: Phlyctidaceae
- Genus: Phlyctis
- Species: P. monosperma

Binomial name
- Phlyctis monosperma S.Joshi & Dalip Upreti (2012)

Species of lichen

Phlyctis monosperma is a species of corticolous (bark-dwelling), crustose lichen in the family Phlyctidaceae. It is characterised by its greyish-white, loose, granular thallus, single-spored asci, and distinctive chemical substances. The lichen is found in the subtropical evergreen forests of the Eastern Himalayas and Western Ghats of India, where it grows on rough tree bark in close association with plant-dwelling bryophytes at elevations above 2,000 m (6,600 ft). It also occurs in Sri Lanka.

== Taxonomy ==
Indian lichenologists Santosh Joshi and Dalip Upreti formally described Phlyctis monosperma as a new species in 2012. The type specimen was collected in Sukhia forest in the Darjeeling district of West Bengal, in June 1976. The specific epithet monosperma refers to the lichen's unique feature of having single-spored asci.

According to James Lendemer and Richard Harris, Phlyctis monosperma should be reevaluated as a possible synonym of P. boliviensis.

== Description ==
Phlyctis monosperma has a greyish-white, loose, and granular thallus. The species is characterised by its single-spored asci and ascospores that have 15 transverse septa. These spores typically measure 140–150 μm long by 30–40 μm wide, and have locules (internal cavities) that are 9–13 μm long. It has a chlorococcoid photobiont. The chemistry of the lichen is marked by the presence of the chemosyndrome centred around the substance psoromic acid. The expected results of standard chemical spot tests are K−, C−, KC−, and P+ (yellow).

The lichen is similar to the New Zealand species Phlyctis megalospora but can be distinguished by its smaller ascospores with fewer septa and the absence of atranorin and protocetraric acid. Another species containing psoromic acid and featuring transversely septate ascospores, Phlyctis psoromica, can be distinguished by its 4–8-spored asci and smaller, 3–7-septate ascospores measuring 30–52 by 4–6 μm. Phlyctis chilensis, a relatively rare and localised species found in the cool temperate regions of South America, shares similarities with the new taxon in having single-spored asci. However, it differs by containing norstictic and connorstictic acids as thallus compounds and having larger, muriform ascospores (190–285 by 55–70 μm). Phlyctis subagelaea, an Indian species with muriform characteristics, also possesses single-spored asci and a whitish-grey ecorticate thallus. Nevertheless, it can be distinguished from P. monosperma by containing fumarprotocetraric acid as a secondary compound.

== Habitat and distribution ==
Phlyctis monosperma is found in the subtropical evergreen forests of the Eastern Himalayas and Western Ghats of India. It typically grows on rough tree bark in close association with epiphytic (plant-dwelling) bryophytes at elevations above 2,000 m (6,600 ft). The species has been collected in India's West Bengal and Tamil Nadu states. In 2014, the lichen was recorded from Sri Lanka.
