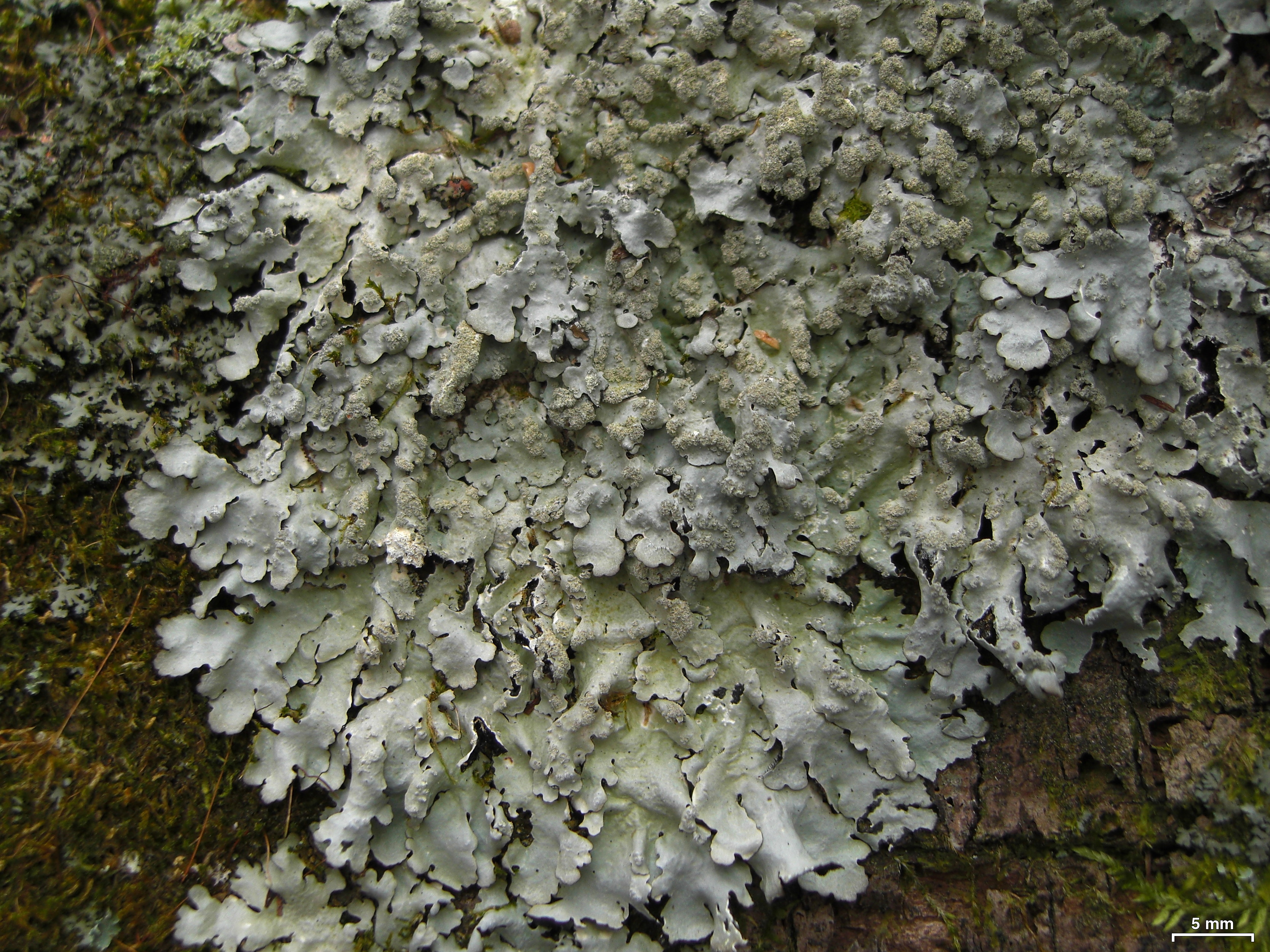
- The powdery axil-bristle lichen, Myelochroa aurulenta

Scientific classification
- Domain: Eukaryota
- Kingdom: Fungi
- Division: Ascomycota
- Class: Lecanoromycetes
- Order: Lecanorales
- Family: Parmeliaceae
- Genus: Myelochroa (Asahina) Elix & Hale (1987)

Type species
- Myelochroa aurulenta (Tuck.) Elix & Hale (1987)

Synonyms
- Parmelia subsect. Myelochroa Asahina (1952); Parmelina sect. Myelochroa (Asahina) Hale (1976)

= Myelochroa =

Genus of lichens

Myelochroa is a genus of foliose lichens in the family Parmeliaceae. They are commonly known as axil-bristle lichens. It was created in 1987 to contain species formerly placed in genus Parmelina that had a yellow-orange medulla due to the presence of secalonic acids. Characteristics of the genus include tightly attached thalli with narrow lobes, cilia on the axils, and a rhizinate black lower surface. Chemical characteristics are the production of zeorin and related triterpenoids in the medulla. Myelochroa contains about 30 species, most of which grow on bark. The genus has centres of distribution in Asia and North America.

== Taxonomy ==
Myelochroa was originally circumscribed by Yasuhiko Asahina as a subsection of section Hypotrachyna in genus Parmelia. This taxon was later raised to sectional status by Hale in 1976. It was promoted to generic status in 1987 by John Elix and Mason Hale. Nineteen species were originally placed in Myelochroa, including the type species, M. aurulenta.

Myelochroa species are commonly known as "axil-bristle lichens".

== Description ==
Myelochroa lichens are small- to medium-sized foliose lichens. Their thalli comprises somewhat linear to irregularly shaped lobes. The lobes have simple (unbranched), slender, black cilia on the margin, sparsely or densely distributed. These are sometimes confined to lobe axils, other times they are more evenly distributed. The upper surface of the thallus is grey, or blue-grey, sometimes with a yellow tinge; this yellowish colour, if present, is more likely to be under the apothecia or close to the algal layer. The medulla is yellow-orange. The lower thallus surface is black and covered with mostly unbranched rhizines. The apothecia are lecanorine, with a reddish-brown cup that lacks perforations. The ascospores, which number eight per ascus, are simple, ellipsoid, colourless, and measure 5–8 by 8–14 μm.

The upper cortex contains the lichen acids atranorin, chloroatranorin, and secalonic acid. The medulla contains hopane triterpene compounds such as zeorin and leucotylic acid as well as secalonic acid A. The presence of these triterpenes distinguishes this genus from Parmelina, and its segregate genera, including Parmelinella, and Parmelinopsis. secalonic acid A is a yellow pigment that reacts C+ yellow and K+ yellow with lichen spot tests.

== Habitat and distribution ==
Most Myelochroa lichens are corticolous. They are largely found in temperate locations, with centre of distribution in eastern Asia and eastern North America. Twelve species of Myelochroa are found in South Korea. The type species, Myelochroa aurulenta, is found throughout the world in temperate forests.

== Species ==
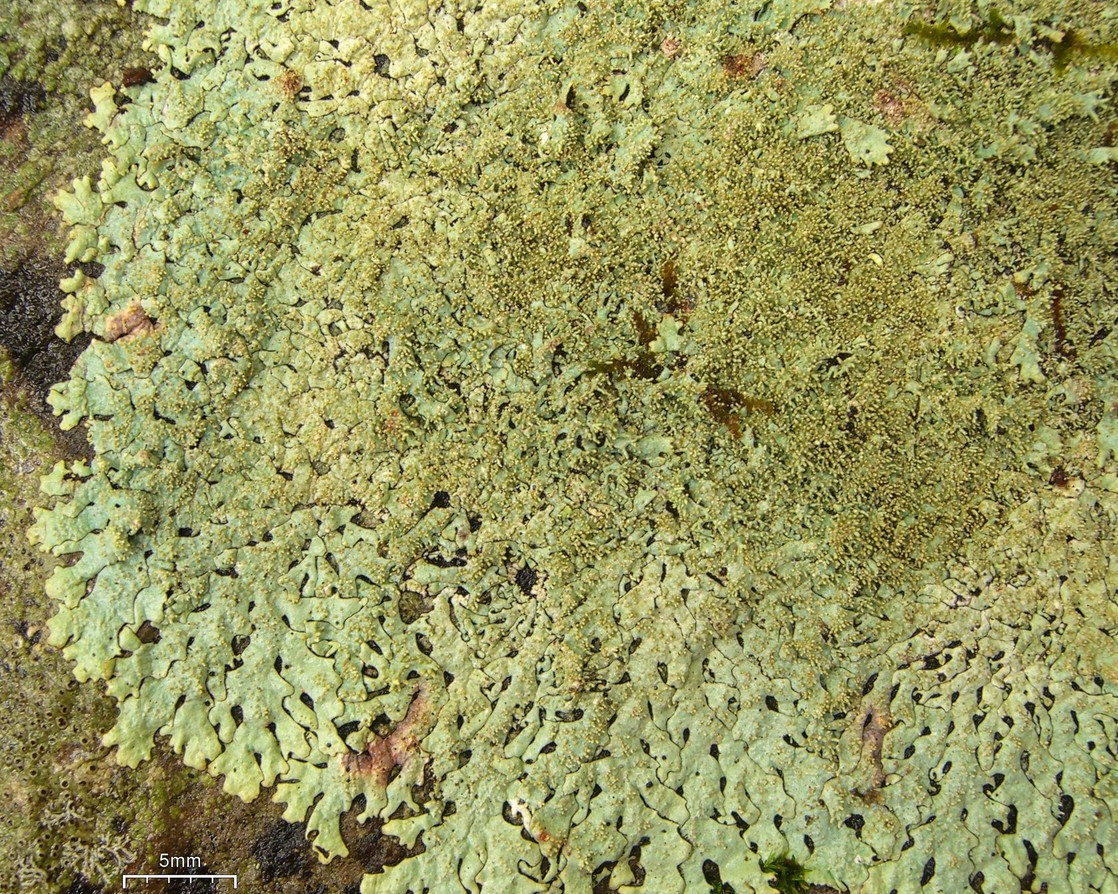
The rock axil-bristle lichen, Myelochroa obsessa

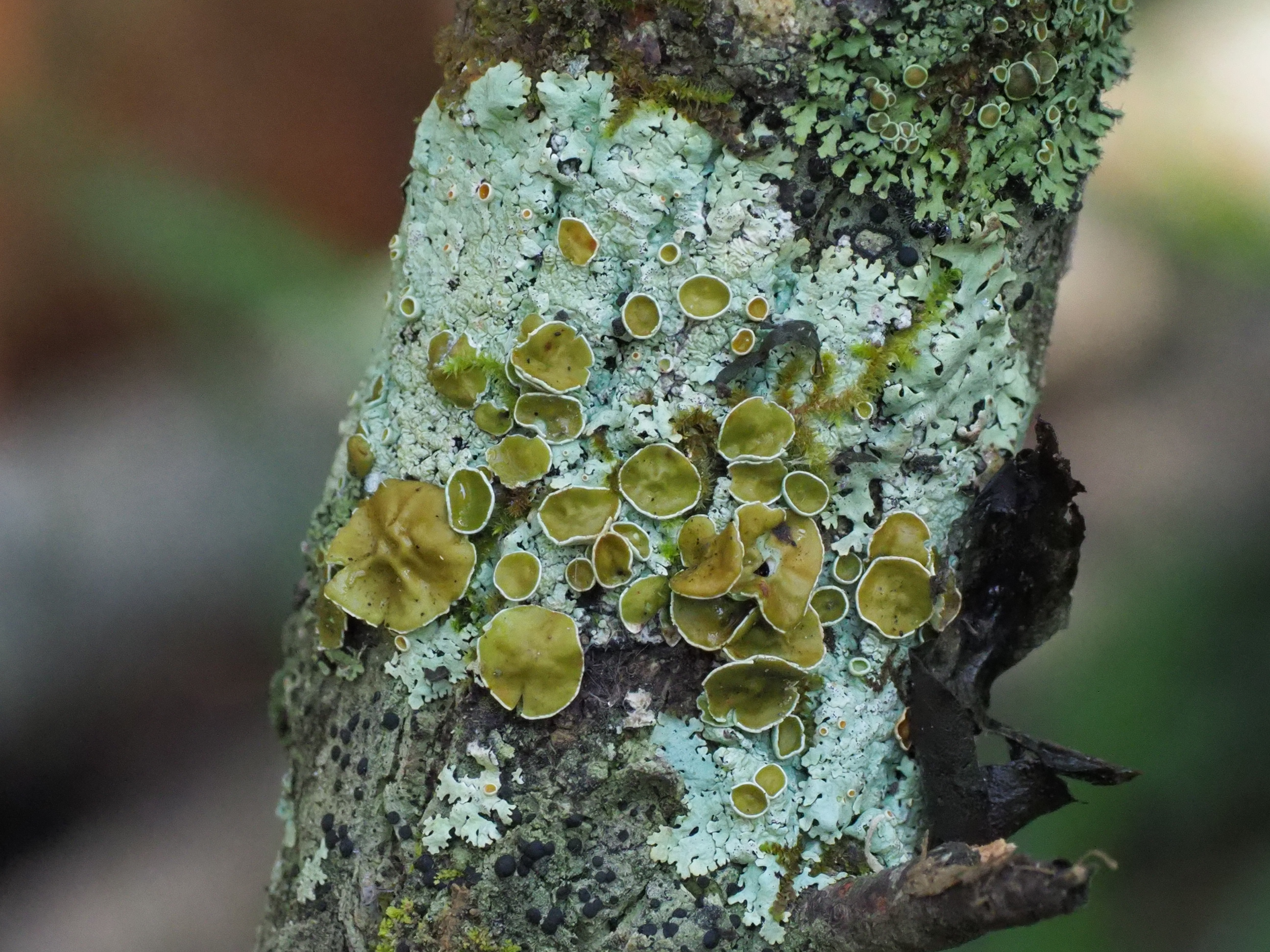
The smooth axil-bristle lichen, Myelochroa galbina, with prominent apothecia

- Myelochroa amagiensis (Asahina) Elix & Hale (1987)
- Myelochroa aurulenta (Tuck.) Elix & Hale (1987) – widespread
- Myelochroa coreana Y.S.Park (1990) – South Korea; Malaysia
- Myelochroa crassata (Hale) Elix & Hale (1987)
- Myelochroa crenulata (J.C.Wei) Hale ex DePriest & B.W.Hale (1998)
- Myelochroa degelii (Hale) Elix & Hale (1987)
- Myelochroa denegans (Nyl.) Elix & Hale (1987) – Asia; Australia
- Myelochroa entotheiochroa (Hue) Elix & Hale (1987) – Asia
- Myelochroa galbina (Ach.) Elix & Hale (1987) – Asia; North America
- Myelochroa hayachinensis (Kurok.) Elix & Hale (1987) – Jeju Island
- Myelochroa ibukiensis K.H.Moon, Kashiw. & Keis. Kobay. (2013) – Japan
- Myelochroa immiscens (Nyl.) Elix & Hale (1987)
- Myelochroa indica (Hale) Elix & Hale (1987) – India
- Myelochroa irrugans (Nyl.) Elix & Hale (1987) – Asia
- Myelochroa leucotyliza (Nyl.) Elix & Hale (1987) – Asia
- Myelochroa macrogalbinica Divakar, Upreti & Elix (2001) – India
- Myelochroa metarevoluta (Asahina) Elix & Hale (1987) – Asia; USA
- Myelochroa nothofagi Elix (1996)
- Myelochroa obsessa (Ach.) Elix & Hale (1987)
- Myelochroa perisidians (Nyl.) Elix & Hale (1987) – Asia
- Myelochroa radiculata (Kurok.) Divakar & A.Crespo (2010)
- Myelochroa rhytidodes (Hale) Elix & Hale (1987)
- Myelochroa salazinica Sheng L.Wang, J.B.Chen & Elix (2001) – China
- Myelochroa sayanensis Otnyukova, Stepanov & Elix (2009) – Siberia
- Myelochroa siamea Kurok. (1998) – Thailand
- Myelochroa sibirica Otnyukova, Stepanov & Elix (2009) – Siberia
- Myelochroa sikkimensis Divakar, Upreti, G.P.Sinha & Elix (2001) – India
- Myelochroa sinica Sheng L.Wang, J.B.Chen & Elix (2001) – China
- Myelochroa subaurulenta (Nyl.) Elix & Hale (1987)
- Myelochroa supraflava Canêz & Marcelli (2008) – Brazil
- Myelochroa upretii Divakar & Elix (2001) – India
- Myelochroa xantholepis (Mont. & Bosch) Elix & Hale (1987) – Asia

The taxon once known as Myelochroa lindmanii (Lynge) Elix & Hale (1987) has been analysed molecularly and shown to belong to the genus Parmelinella.
