= Myelochroa macrogalbinica =

Scientific classification
- Kingdom: Fungi
- Division: Ascomycota
- Class: Lecanoromycetes
- Order: Lecanorales
- Family: Parmeliaceae
- Genus: Myelochroa
- Species: M. macrogalbinica

Binomial name
- Myelochroa macrogalbinica Divakar, Upreti & Elix (2001)

Species of lichen

Myelochroa macrogalbinica is a species of corticolous (bark-delling)foliose lichen in the family Parmeliaceae. Found in India, it was described as a new species in 2001.

== Taxonomy ==
Myelochroa macrogalbinica was formally described as a new species in 2001 by the lichenologists Pradeep Divakar, Dalip Kumar Upreti and John Elix. The type specimen was collected by Ajay Singh on 22 May 1972, and is housed in the lichen herbarium at LWG (National Botanical Research Institute, Lucknow, India). The species differs from the widespread Myelochroa galbina in having loosely adnate thallus (growing close but not tightly attached to its substrate), broader lobes, and larger apothecia (fruiting bodies) with larger spores.

== Description ==
Myelochroa macrogalbinica has a foliose (leafy) thallus that grows up to 8 cm wide. Its lobes are overlapping like roof tiles (imbricate), sublinear to subirregular (somewhat linear to somewhat irregular) in shape, irregularly branched, apically subrotund (somewhat rounded at the tips), 2–6 mm wide, and have ciliate margins (having hair-like structures along the edges). The cilia (hair-like projections) are dense, simple, regularly dispersed, and 0.5–1.0 mm long. The upper surface is pale grey becoming pale brown when preserved in herbariums. It is flat to undulate (wavy), shiny at the apices but dull within, with a white-maculate (spotted) appearance, and lacks both isidia and soredia (vegetative reproductive structures).

The medulla (inner layer) is lemon-yellow to pale yellow. The lower surface is black with a brown narrow marginal zone. The rhizines (root-like structures on the lower surface) are dense, black, simple or squarrose (with perpendicular branches) branched, and 1–2 mm long.

A distinguishing feature of this species is the presence of apothecia (cup-like reproductive structures), which are common, substipitate (with a short stalk), 2–15 mm wide, and initially shallowly concave before becoming flat and undulate-distorted with age. The apothecia are dark brown with a thin margin. Ascospores (spores produced in the apothecia) are broadly ellipsoid, measuring 14–25 by 9–13 μm. The species also has black, immersed pycnidia (flask-shaped structures) with weakly bifusiform conidia (asexual spores) measuring 4.5–6.5 by 1 μm.

=== Chemistry ===
The chemistry of M. macrogalbinica is characterised by specific spot test reactions and a distinctive set of secondary metabolites. The cortex (outer layer) is K+ (yellow), while the medulla is K+ (yellow then dark red), C−, and P+ (orange-red). Chemically, the lichen contains atranorin (minor), galbinic acid (major), salazinic acid (major), secalonic acid W (major), and zeorin (major) among other compounds. M. macrogalbinica contains secalonic acid A rather than secalonic acid R or secalonic acid W as a major medullary pigment, which distinguishes it from some related species within the genus.

== Habitat and distribution ==
At the time of its original publication, Myelochroa macrogalbinica was known from several locations in Uttar Pradesh and the western Himalayas in India. The type locality was collected from the Almora district in Uttarakhand (formerly part of Uttar Pradesh), India, at an elevation of 2,700 m (8,900 ft). It was found growing on twigs. In addition to Almora, it has also been recorded in the Pindari Glacier valley.
