= Phlyctis subagelaea =

Scientific classification
- Kingdom: Fungi
- Division: Ascomycota
- Class: Lecanoromycetes
- Order: Gyalectales
- Family: Phlyctidaceae
- Genus: Phlyctis
- Species: P. subagelaea

Binomial name
- Phlyctis subagelaea S.Joshi & Upreti (2010)

Species of lichen

Phlyctis subagelaea is a species of crustose lichen in the family Phlyctidaceae. It was described as new to science in 2006 from material collected in the tropical forests of southern India. Its species epithet, subagelaea, refers to its strong resemblance to the related species Phlyctis agelaea.

== Taxonomy ==
Phlyctis subagelaea was formally described by the lichenologists Santosh Joshi and Dalip Kumar Upreti in 2006, based on a specimen collected from the Periyar Tiger Reserve in the Idukki district of Kerala, India. This specimen, deposited as the holotype at LWG (National Botanical Research Institute, Lucknow), serves as the reference for this species.

== Description ==
Phlyctis subagelaea forms a crustose, thin, and somewhat patchy thallus on tree bark. Its surface is whitish-grey with a rough, uneven, and cracked texture, lacking an outer cortex layer. A prothallus—an initial growth layer at the edges of the thallus—may be indistinct or occasionally visible as a slightly blackened line. The lichen contains a green, spherical (protococcoid) algal partner, which provides photosynthetic nutrients.

The reproductive structures, known as apothecia, are numerous and scattered across the thallus. They are irregular to roughly rounded and emerge slightly above the thallus surface, measuring about 1–2 mm in diameter. Their inner disc is brown to nearly black and concave, and it can appear heavily dusted with a whitish, powdery coating (pruina).

Within the apothecia, the epithecium (the layer above the spore-bearing tissue) is granular and brownish, measuring about 10–15 μm thick. Below this, the hymenium (the fertile layer where spores develop) is clear and hyaline, reaching a height of 60–100 μm. The hypothecium (the layer beneath the hymenium) is also hyaline, 25–30 μm thick. The paraphyses, which are thread-like supportive filaments interspersed among the developing spores, are branched and measure 1.5–2 μm in thickness.

Each ascus (a sac-like structure that produces spores) typically contains a single large spore. These asci are broadly clavate (club-shaped) and measure approximately 120–150 by 20–40 μm. The ascospores are large, hyaline, and muriform—meaning they are divided into multiple chambers by both vertical and horizontal walls—and measure about 60–130 by 12–30 μm. Both asci and ascospores react positively with iodine (I+) staining, indicating the presence of starch-like compounds.

Chemically, P. subagelaea is characterised by the presence of fumarprotocetraric acid. It reacts with standard chemical spot tests: K+ (yellow), PD (orange), C−, and KC (red).

== Habitat and distribution ==
Phlyctis subagelaea is known only from its type locality in the tropical forests of southern India, where it grows on tree bark in humid and relatively undisturbed habitats. Its full range and ecological preferences remain poorly understood, as it has not yet been reported from other locations.

== Similar species ==
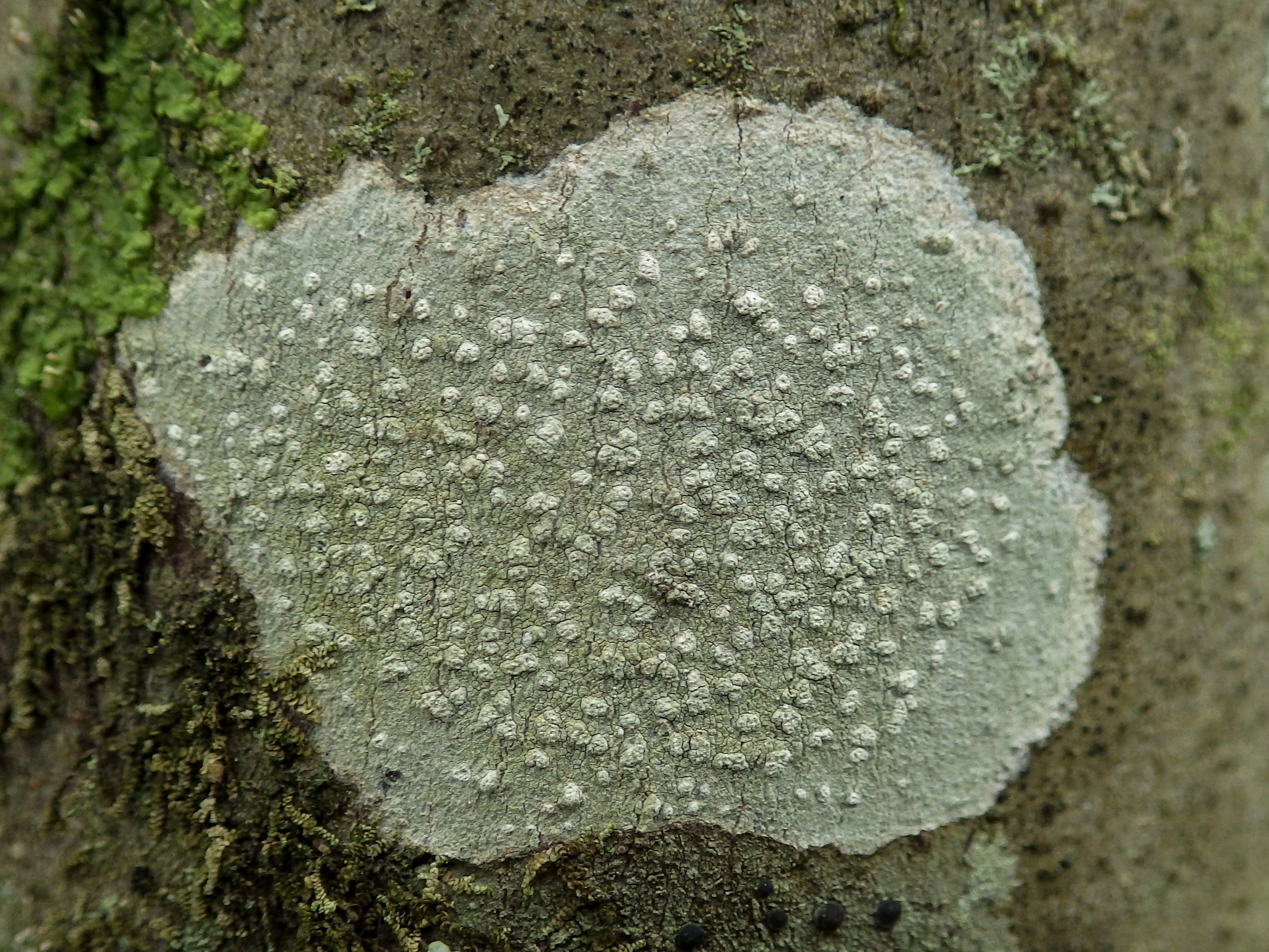
Phlyctis agelaea

Phlyctis subagelaea closely resembles Phlyctis agelaea, sharing similar spore dimensions and certain morphological traits. However, P. agelaea typically has a thallus containing norstictic acid, smaller apothecia (0.2–1 mm), and asci that may hold 2–4 spores each, distinguishing it from P. subagelaea.

The sympatric species P. polyphora differs by having a K– (unreactive) thallus and producing 3–8 spores per ascus. Similarly, P. subagelaea can be compared to species such as P. nepalensis, P. argena, and P. chilensis, all of which have single-spored asci. However, these species differ in various traits:

- P. nepalensis has a K– thallus, smaller apothecia (0.1–0.3 mm), and a non-pruinose disc.
- P. chilensis has much larger spores (up to 230–285 by 55–70 μm) and produces norstictic and connorstictic acids.
- P. argena is sorediate (has powdery propagules for reproduction), with smaller apothecia (0.2–0.4 mm), and slightly larger spores (100–150 μm in length), also producing norstictic and connorstictic acids.
