= Phlyctis subhimalayensis =

Scientific classification
- Domain: Eukaryota
- Kingdom: Fungi
- Division: Ascomycota
- Class: Lecanoromycetes
- Order: Gyalectales
- Family: Phlyctidaceae
- Genus: Phlyctis
- Species: P. subhimalayensis

Binomial name
- Phlyctis subhimalayensis S.Joshi & Dalip Upreti (2012)

Species of lichen

Phlyctis subhimalayensis is a species of corticolous (bark-dwelling), crustose lichen in the family Phlyctidaceae. It is found in certain high-elevations regions of the Himalayas and Southwestern China.

== Taxonomy ==
Phlyctis subhimalayensis was described by lichenologists Santosh Joshi and Dalip Kumar Upreti as a new species in 2012. The name of the species alludes to both its resemblance to Phlyctis himalayensis and its collection location in the Himalayas. The type specimen was found in Uttarakhand, India, on a Quercus semecarpifolia tree in the Pithoragarh district, at an elevation of 2,500 m (8,200 ft).

== Description ==
This lichen species has a crustose, smooth, greenish-grey to greyish-white thallus, with a whitish or absent prothallus. The chroodiscoid apothecia feature pruinose black discs and white exfoliating margins. The ascospores are hyaline, non-halonate, and have 5 to 7 transverse septa; their dimensions are 20–35 μm long and 2–4 μm wide. The photobiont of the lichen is chlorococcoid—spherical green algae. No lichen products were detected in the collected samples using thin-layer chromatography, and all standard chemical spot tests are negative.

=== Similar species ===
Phlyctis subhimalayensis closely resembles Phlyctis himalayensis and P. karnatakana but differs in thallus chemistry and ascospore size. It also bears some resemblance to the New Zealand taxa P. longifera and P. megalospora in terms of transverse spore septation. However, these two species have larger ascospores and contain depsidones such as stictic acid and psoromic acid, respectively. In terms of morphology and chroodiscoid apothecia, Phlyctis subhimalayensis can be confused with the thelotremoid Graphidaceae (e.g. Chapsa) and the non-lichenized genus Stictis. Nevertheless, the absence of periphysoids, the presence of chlorococcoid algae, and a poorly developed proper exciple differentiate the new species from these others.

== Habitat and distribution ==
Phlyctis subhimalayensis is known to inhabit cool temperate forests in the northern and eastern Himalayas, specifically in Uttarakhand and Arunachal Pradesh, India. In these habitats, it thrives on Quercus semecarpifolia and Acer nepalensis trees at elevations of more than 2,500 m (8,200 ft). In 2022, its known range was expanded when it was reported as new to China, having been discovered on mountains near Chuxiong City (Yunnan), at 2,200 m (7,200 ft).
