= Phlyctis subargena =

Scientific classification
- Kingdom: Fungi
- Division: Ascomycota
- Class: Lecanoromycetes
- Order: Gyalectales
- Family: Phlyctidaceae
- Genus: Phlyctis
- Species: P. subargena

Binomial name
- Phlyctis subargena R.Ma & H.Y.Wang (2011)

Species of lichen-forming fungus

Phlyctis subargena is a species of crustose lichen in the family Phlyctidaceae. It forms thin, greenish-white patches on tree bark and reproduces both by powdery soredia and by small fruiting bodies that typically occur in clusters. The species is known only from montane forests in Gansu Province, north-central China.

== Taxonomy ==
Phlyctis subargena was described as new to science in 2011 by Rui Ma and Hai-Ying Wang, based on bark-dwelling material collected in Gansu Province in north-central China. The holotype was collected at Qiujiaba (Wen County, Longnan) at 2,450 m elevation on 2 August 2007 and is housed in the lichen herbarium of Shandong Normal University (SDNU).

The species was separated from other members of Phlyctis by a combination of abundant soredia (powdery dispersal granules), frequent clusters of small apothecia, and asci that usually contain two spores rather than one or eight; chemically, it contains the depsidone norstictic acid. It is most similar in appearance to the sorediate P. argena, but that species typically has solitary apothecia, one spore per ascus, larger spores, and a trace of connorstictic acid (absent from P. subargena). Another sorediate relative, P. subuncinata, differs in having fusiform(spindle-shaped) spores and different secondary metabolites (stictic and cryptostictic acids).

== Description ==
The thallus is crustose and thin (about 60–120 μm thick), forming greenish-white patches on bark. Its surface is uneven and has a somewhat cobwebby or felty texture, and it often breaks into small, irregular areoles about 0.1–0.2 mm across; a white prothallus may be visible at the margins and in cracks. The soralia are usually paler than the surrounding thallus and produce abundant powdery to granular soredia; neighbouring soralia may merge into diffuse, irregular patches.

Apothecia (fruiting bodies) are common and minute (about 0.1–0.3 mm wide), usually occurring in clusters of 3–8 (occasionally up to 10) and partly immersed within sorediate thallus patches. The disc is reddish-brown, flat to slightly irregular, and usually dusted with white pruina; the exciple (rim) is weakly developed. Microscopically, the spore-bearing asci are broadly club-shaped and two-spored (110–150 × 32–40 μm). The colourless spores are muriform (divided by many cross-walls), measuring 42–78 × 30–42 μm, and show no iodine reaction (I−). The photobiont (photosynthetic partner) is a green alga with spherical cells 12–18 μm in diameter. In spot tests the cortex is K+ (yellow) and C−, while the medulla is K+ (yellow–orange–red), C−, and PD+ (yellow). Thin-layer chromatography detected norstictic acid as the major lichen product.

== Habitat and distribution ==
Phlyctis subargena is a corticolous (bark-dwelling) species, known only from its type locality in Qiujiaba, Wenxian County, Longnan, in Gansu Province, China. Collections in the type series were made on bark at about 2,350–2,450 m elevation during July and August 2007. As of its original description, the species had not been reported from elsewhere, so its wider range and ecological requirements remain poorly documented beyond the locality data available in the original report. Phlyctis subargena is one of five Phlyctis species that had been reported from China before a 2022 overview added P. subhimalayensis as a new national record.
