= Myelochroa upretii =

Scientific classification
- Kingdom: Fungi
- Division: Ascomycota
- Class: Lecanoromycetes
- Order: Lecanorales
- Family: Parmeliaceae
- Genus: Myelochroa
- Species: M. upretii

Binomial name
- Myelochroa upretii Divakar & Elix (2001)

Species of lichen

Myelochroa upretii is a species of corticolous (bark-dwelling), foliose lichen in the family Parmeliaceae. It occurs in northern India.

== Taxonomy ==
It was described as a new species in 2001 by the lichenologists Pradeep Divakar and John Elix. The type specimen was collected by Dalip Kumar Upreti on 21 November 1989, and is housed in the lichen herbarium at LWG (National Botanical Research Institute, Lucknow, India). The species epithet upretii honours the collector Upreti, a lichenologist known for his contributions to Asian lichenology.

== Description ==
Myelochroa upretii has foliose (leafy) thallus that grows up to 11 cm wide. Its lobes are imbricate (overlapping like roof tiles), sublinear to subrotund (somewhat linear to somewhat rounded), 2–10 mm wide, and marginally ciliate (having hair-like structures along the edges).

The lobe margins erode into somewhat pustulate soralia (structures containing powdery reproductive propagules). The upper surface is pale mineral-grey, becoming yellow-brown when preserved in herbaria. It is flat, shiny, emaculate (without spots), and becomes rugose (wrinkled) with age. The upper surface lacks isidia (tiny coral-like outgrowths).

The soralia (structures containing powdery reproductive propagules) originate marginally or submarginally and spread in a laminar pattern. The soredia (individual powdery propagules) are granular, and the marginal lobes are weakly rolled backwards (revolute).

The medulla (inner layer) is mostly white, with pale yellow in some places. The lower surface is black with a narrow brown marginal zone. The rhizines (root-like structures on the lower surface) are dense, black, simple or rarely dichotomously branched, and 0.5–1.5 mm long. No apothecia (disc-like fruiting bodies) or pycnidia (flask-shaped structures) have been observed in this species.

=== Chemistry ===
The chemistry of M. upretii is characterised by distinctive colour reactions and a specific set of secondary metabolites. The cortex (outer layer) is K+ (yellow), while the medulla is K+ (yellow then dark red), C−, P+ (orange-red). Chemically, the lichen contains several major lichen products including galbinic acid, salazinic acid, zeorin, and secalonic acid A as its primary medullary pigment. This last compound is particularly significant as a taxonomic marker, as it distinguishes M. upretii from closely related species like M. metarevoluta, which instead contain secalonic acid R, secalonic acid W, or pigmentosin B as their major medullary pigments. The presence of substantial quantities of galbinic acid and 16β-acetoxyhopane-6α,22-diol is also taxonomically important, differentiating this species from the chemically similar M. salazinica.

== Habitat and distribution ==
At the time of its original publication, Myelochroa upretii was known only from its type locality in northern India, specifically in the Pithoragarh district of Uttar Pradesh, at an elevation of 1900 metres. It was collected growing on Rhododendron in an oak forest. In a later (2011) study of lichen biodiversity occurring on the tree Quercus leucotrichophora in Uttarakhand forests, M. upretii was only found at elevations above 2,300 m (7,500 ft). It has also been recorded from Pithoragarh.

In contrast to M. upretii, the closely related species M. metarevoluta has a wider distribution across the eastern United States, Japan, China, and India, while M. macrogalbinica has been recorded from several locations in Uttar Pradesh and the western Himalayas in India.
