= Phlyctis sirindhorniae =

Scientific classification
- Kingdom: Fungi
- Division: Ascomycota
- Class: Lecanoromycetes
- Order: Gyalectales
- Family: Phlyctidaceae
- Genus: Phlyctis
- Species: P. sirindhorniae

Binomial name
- Phlyctis sirindhorniae Poengs., Vongshew. & Lumbsch (2019)

Species of lichen

Phlyctis sirindhorniae is a little-known species of corticolous (bark-dwelling), crustose lichen in the family Phlyctidaceae. It shares some similarities with Phlyctis agelaea but can be distinguished by its smaller ascospores, larger apothecia, and a higher number of ascospores per ascus. It is only known to exist in a specific location in northeastern Thailand.

== Taxonomy ==
Phlyctis sirindhorniae was formally described by lichenologists Vasun Poengsungnoen, Kajohnsak Vongshewarat, and H. Thorsten Lumbsch in 2019. The type specimen was collected on the trunk of the tree Lophopetalum wallichii in a dry dipterocarp forest near Ramkhamhaeng University Chaloem Phrakiat Campus in Nong Bua Lamphu province, Thailand. The specific epithet sirindhorniae honours Princess Maha Chakri Sirindhorn of Thailand for her Plant Genetic Conservation Project, which aims to preserve the country's plant varieties.

== Description ==
Phlyctis sirindhorniae has a corticolous, crustose thallus, which is off-white to greyish-white and ranges up to 5 cm (2.0 in) in diameter and 80–130 μm thick. The apothecia are numerous, scattered, and solitary, or sometimes aggregate or fused into groups. The ascospores are muriform with 12–17 transverse septa and 2–3 longitudinal septa per segment, measuring 35–60 by 14–18 μm.

This lichen species is similar to Phlyctis agelaea due to their muriform ascospores and presence of norstictic acid. However, Phlyctis sirindhorniae has smaller ascospores, larger apothecia, and more ascospores per ascus. Other similar species include Phlyctis communis and Phlyctis lueckingii, which also contain norstictic acid but have transversely septate ascospores.

=== Similar species ===
The authors suggest that according to a key published by Muscavitch and colleagues in 2017, Phlyctis sirindhorniae is closely related to Phlyctis agelaea, as they both have muriform ascospores and contain norstictic acid. However, P. sirindhorniae has smaller ascospores, larger apothecia, and more ascospores per ascus, which distinguish it from P. agelaea.

== Habitat and distribution ==
Phlyctis sirindhorniae is found on the trunks of Lophopetalum wallichii trees in dry dipterocarp forests in northeastern Thailand, specifically near Ramkhamhaeng University Chaloem Phrakiat Campus in Nong Bua Lum Phu. At the time of its publication, the lichen was only known to occur in its type locality.
