= Aspergillus uvarum =

Scientific classification
- Domain: Eukaryota
- Kingdom: Fungi
- Division: Ascomycota
- Class: Eurotiomycetes
- Order: Eurotiales
- Family: Aspergillaceae
- Genus: Aspergillus
- Species: A. uvarum

Binomial name
- Aspergillus uvarum G. Perrone (2008)

Species of fungus

Aspergillus uvarum is a species of fungus in the genus Aspergillus. It belongs to the group of black Aspergilli which are important industrial workhorses. A. uvarum belongs to the Nigri section. The species was first described in 2008. A. uvarum has been isolated from grapes in Europe. It has been shown to produce secalonic acid, which is common for other black aspergilli; and geodin, erdin, and dihydrogeodin, which are not produced by any other black aspergilli.

The genome of A. uvarum was sequenced and published in 2014 as part of the Aspergillus whole-genome sequencing project – a project dedicated to performing whole-genome sequencing of all members of the genus Aspergillus. The genome assembly size was 35.85 Mbp. A. uvarum has 12,347 genes.

== Growth and morphology ==
Aspergillus uvarum has been cultivated on both Czapek yeast extract agar (CYA) plates and Malt Extract Agar Oxoid (MEAOX) plates. The growth morphology of the colonies can be seen in the pictures below.

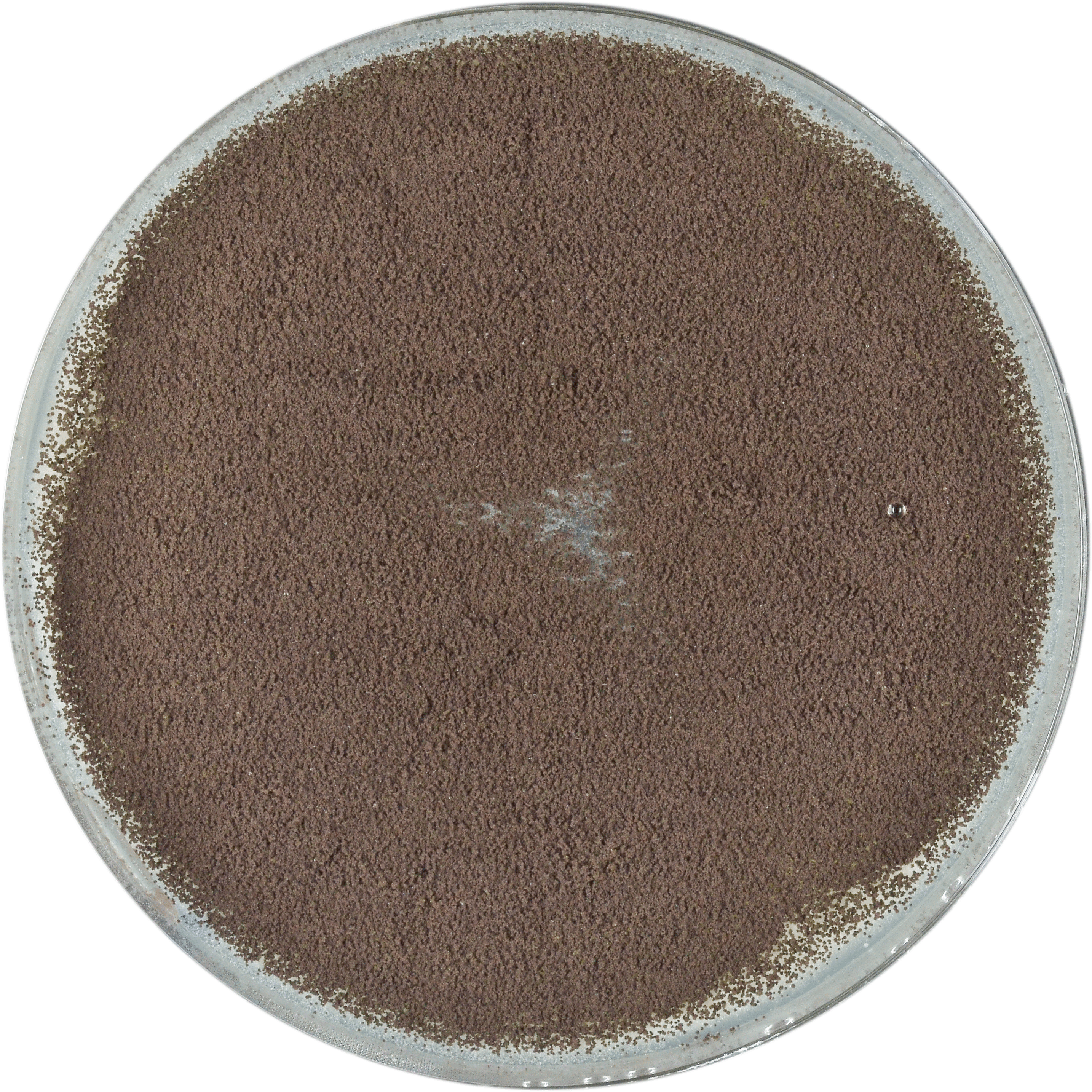
Aspergillus uvarum growing on CYA plate

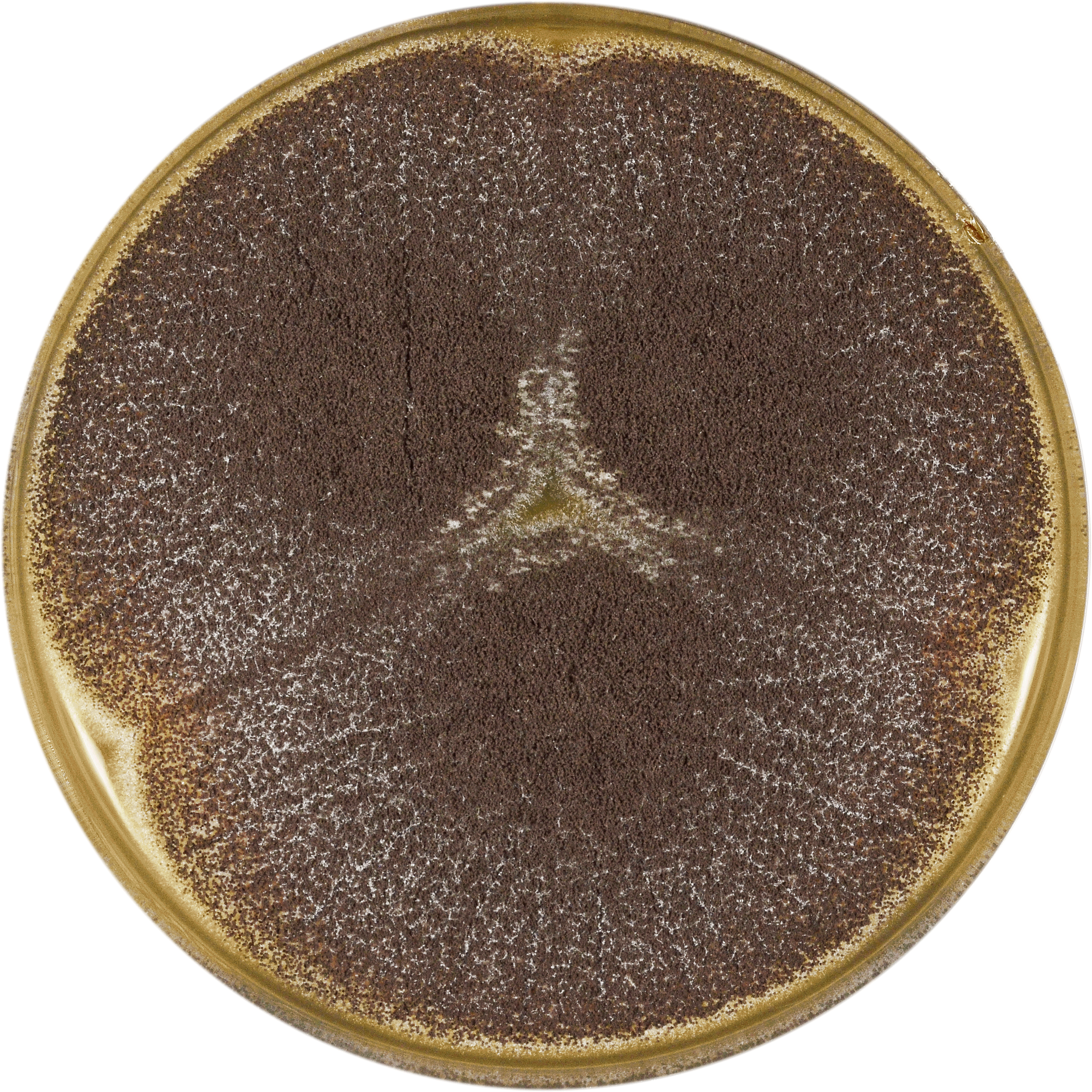
Aspergillus uvarum growing on MEAOX plate
