= Penicillium isariiforme =

Scientific classification
- Kingdom: Fungi
- Division: Ascomycota
- Class: Eurotiomycetes
- Order: Eurotiales
- Family: Aspergillaceae
- Genus: Penicillium
- Species: P. isariiforme

Binomial name
- Penicillium isariiforme Stolk, A.C.; Meyer, J. 1957

Type strain
- ATCC 48951, CBS 249.56, FRR 2639, IMI 070950, J. Meyer 32357, NRRL 2639

Synonyms
- Penicillium isariaeforme

Species of fungus

Penicillium isariiforme is an anamorph, phototropic species of the genus of Penicillium which produce secalonic acid D and F.
