= Phlyctis communis =

Scientific classification
- Kingdom: Fungi
- Division: Ascomycota
- Class: Lecanoromycetes
- Order: Gyalectales
- Family: Phlyctidaceae
- Genus: Phlyctis
- Species: P. communis

Binomial name
- Phlyctis communis Chitale & Makhija (2012)

Species of lichen

Phlyctis communis is a species of corticolous (bark-dwelling) crustose lichen in the family Phlyctidaceae. Found in the Maharashtra state of India, it grows on the bark of tree trunks in semi-evergreen to dry deciduous forests. Described as a new species in 2012, the lichen is characterised by its greyish or greenish-white crustose thallus and numerous ascomata, ascospores that have between 7 and 14 transverse septa, and the presence of corstictic and salazinic acids.

== Taxonomy ==
Phlyctis communis was formally described as a new species by Gayatri Chitale and Urmila Makhija in 2012. The name of the species is derived from the Latin word communis, referring to its abundant or common occurrence. The type specimen was collected by the second author in the Mahabaleshwar region of Maharashtra, India, in 1998.

== Description ==
The thallus of Phlyctis communis is crustose and corticolous, with a greyish or greenish-white colour. It spreads over its host bark substrate in patches measuring 5–12 cm (2.0–4.7 in), with a cracked and areolate surface. The thallus is typically 90–120 μm thick at the margin. The ascomata are black, round or oblong, and scattered across the thallus. They can be found grouped together, forming patches on tree trunks. Individual ascomata are less than 1 mm across and immersed in the thallus.

The ascospores of this species are hyaline, 7–14 transversely septate, and typically measure 18–33 by 6–9 μm. The presence of norstictic and salazinic acids is a distinctive feature of this species, setting it apart from similar species, such as P. karnatakana, which contains only norstictic acid.

=== Similar species ===
Phlyctis communis is morphologically similar to several other species within the genus, including P. karnatakana, P. subuncinata, P. himalayensis, P. longifera, P. psoromica, P. polyphora, and P. sirindhorniae. However, it can be distinguished by its unique combination of ascospore septation and chemical constituents, such as the presence of both norstictic and salazinic acids.

== Habitat and distribution ==
Phlyctis communis is native to India and has been collected in several districts, including Maharashtra, Kolhapur, Pune, Satara, and Sindhudurg districts. It is commonly found in semi-evergreen to dry deciduous forests with a relative humidity range of 15–90%. This lichen species frequently grows in large patches on the bark of Ficus benghalensis and Casuarina equisetifolia, often associating with the lichen Arthothelium awasthii.
