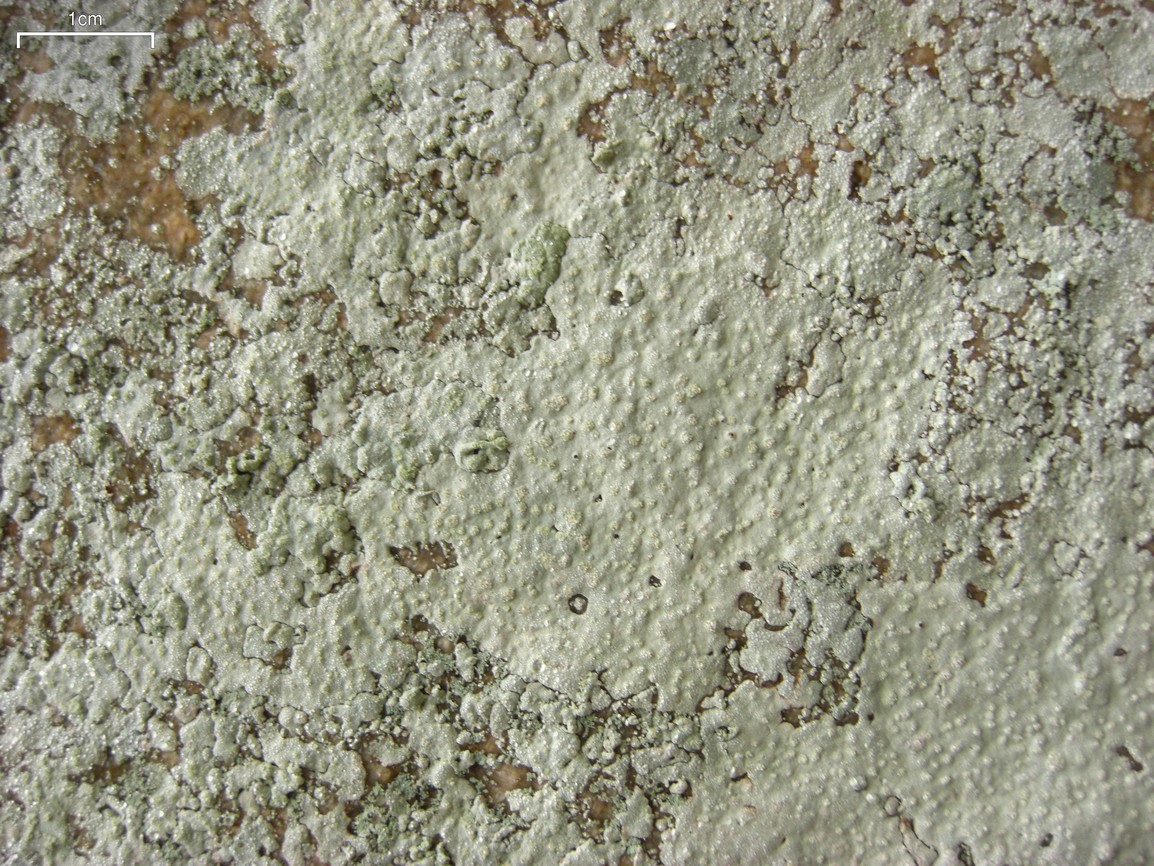
- near Augusta, Georgia

Conservation status
- Least Concern (IUCN 3.1)

Scientific classification
- Kingdom: Fungi
- Division: Ascomycota
- Class: Lecanoromycetes
- Order: Gyalectales
- Family: Phlyctidaceae
- Genus: Phlyctis
- Species: P. petraea

Binomial name
- Phlyctis petraea R.C.Harris, Musc., Ladd & Lendemer (2017)

= Phlyctis petraea =

Species of lichen

Phlyctis petraea, the eggshell rock blaze, is a species of saxicolous (rock-dwelling) crustose lichen in the family Phlyctidaceae. Found in eastern North America, it was formally described as a new species in 2017 by Richard Clinton Harris, Zachary Muscavitch, Douglas Ladd, and James Lendemer. Because of its widespread occurrence throughout eastern North America and its abundant and stable populations, it is considered a species of least concern by the International Union for Conservation of Nature.
