= Canoparmelia subroseoreagens =

Scientific classification
- Domain: Eukaryota
- Kingdom: Fungi
- Division: Ascomycota
- Class: Lecanoromycetes
- Order: Lecanorales
- Family: Parmeliaceae
- Genus: Canoparmelia
- Species: C. subroseoreagens

Binomial name
- Canoparmelia subroseoreagens Marcelli, Canêz & Elix (2009)

Species of lichen

Canoparmelia subroseoreagens is a species of foliose lichen in the family Parmeliaceae. Found in Brazil, it was formally described as a new species in 2009 by lichenologists Marcelo Marcelli, Luciana da Silva Canêz, and John Elix. The type specimen was collected from a Brazilian pine forest in Fazenda da Estrela (Vacaria, Rio Grande do Sul) at an altitude of 905 m (2,969 ft), where it was found growing on tree bark. The lichen is named for its similarity to Canoparmelia roseoreagens (found in the same locality) but that species produces isidia rather than soredia.

Canoparmelia subroseoreagens is identifiable by its upper surface that is deeply cracked. Most of the soredia on this lichen grow from the raised edges of the cracks and create round, indented structures that look like open pustules. This lichen has a distinctive chemical composition that includes olivetolcarboxylic acid, which turns pink when treated with the C (calcium hypochlorite) chemical spot test. Additionally, this lichen produces many meta-depside compounds whose properties are unknown.
