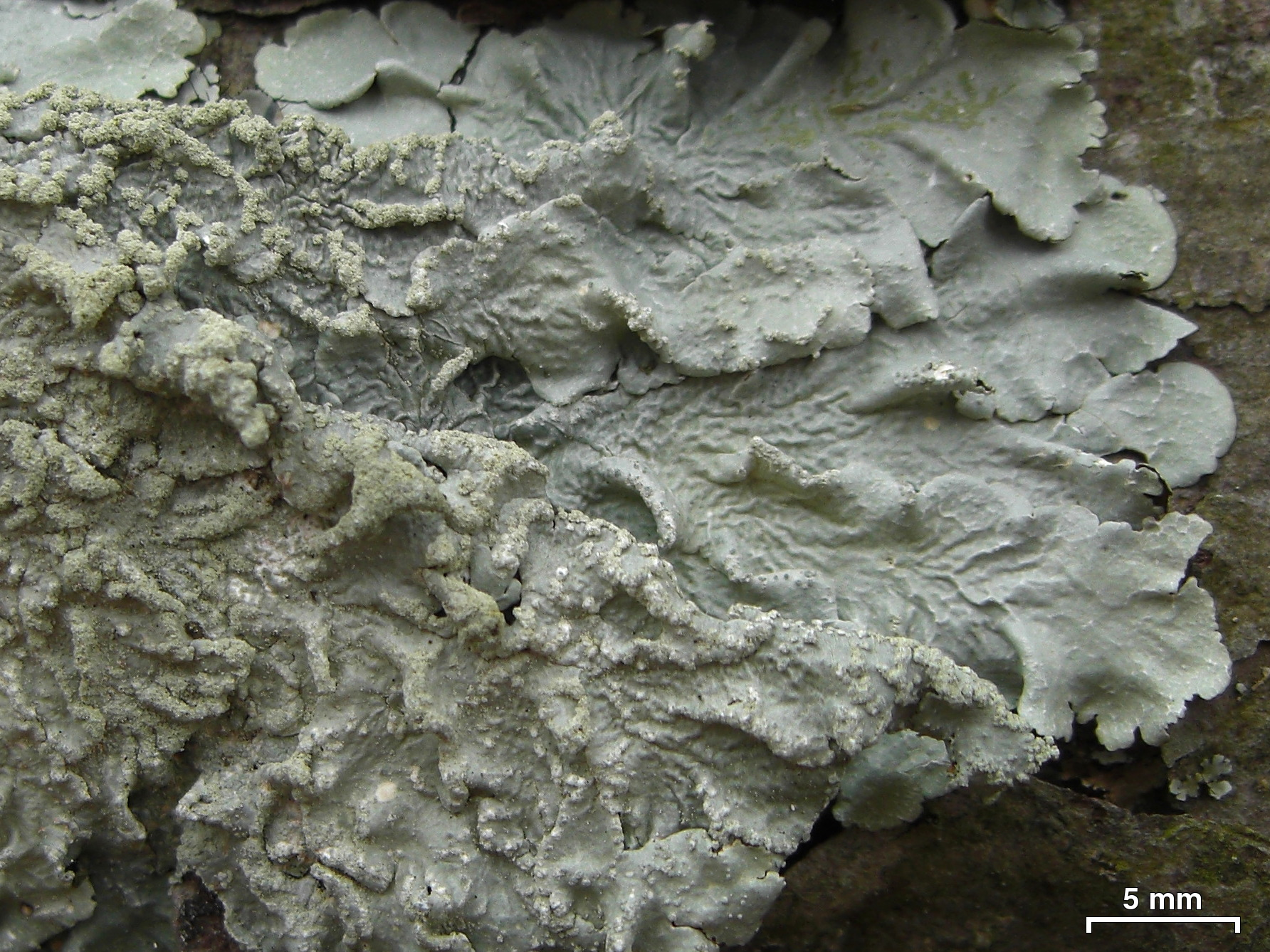
- Canoparmelia texana

Scientific classification
- Domain: Eukaryota
- Kingdom: Fungi
- Division: Ascomycota
- Class: Lecanoromycetes
- Order: Lecanorales
- Family: Parmeliaceae
- Genus: Canoparmelia; Elix & Hale (1986)

Type species
- Canoparmelia texana (Tuck.) Elix & Hale (1986)

= Canoparmelia =

Genus of lichens

Canoparmelia is a genus of lichen-forming fungi in the family Parmeliaceae. The widespread genus contains about 35 species. Canoparmelia, a segregate of the parmelioid lichen genus Pseudoparmelia, was circumscribed by John Elix and Mason Hale in 1986.

== Description ==
Canoparmelia lichens have grey or rarely yellow-green thalli containing the secondary chemicals atranorin and chloroatranorin, or rarely usnic acid, in the cortex. The thallus is made of more or less rotund lobes that are 3.0–5.0 mm wide and lack cilia; the medulla is white. The underside of the thallus is black or brown with naked brown margins and simple rhizines of the same colour. Canoparmelia produces small ellipsoid ascospores that measure 10–14 by 6–8 μm. The conidia are fusiform (spindle-shaped) or bifusiform, measuring 7–10 μm long.

== Species ==
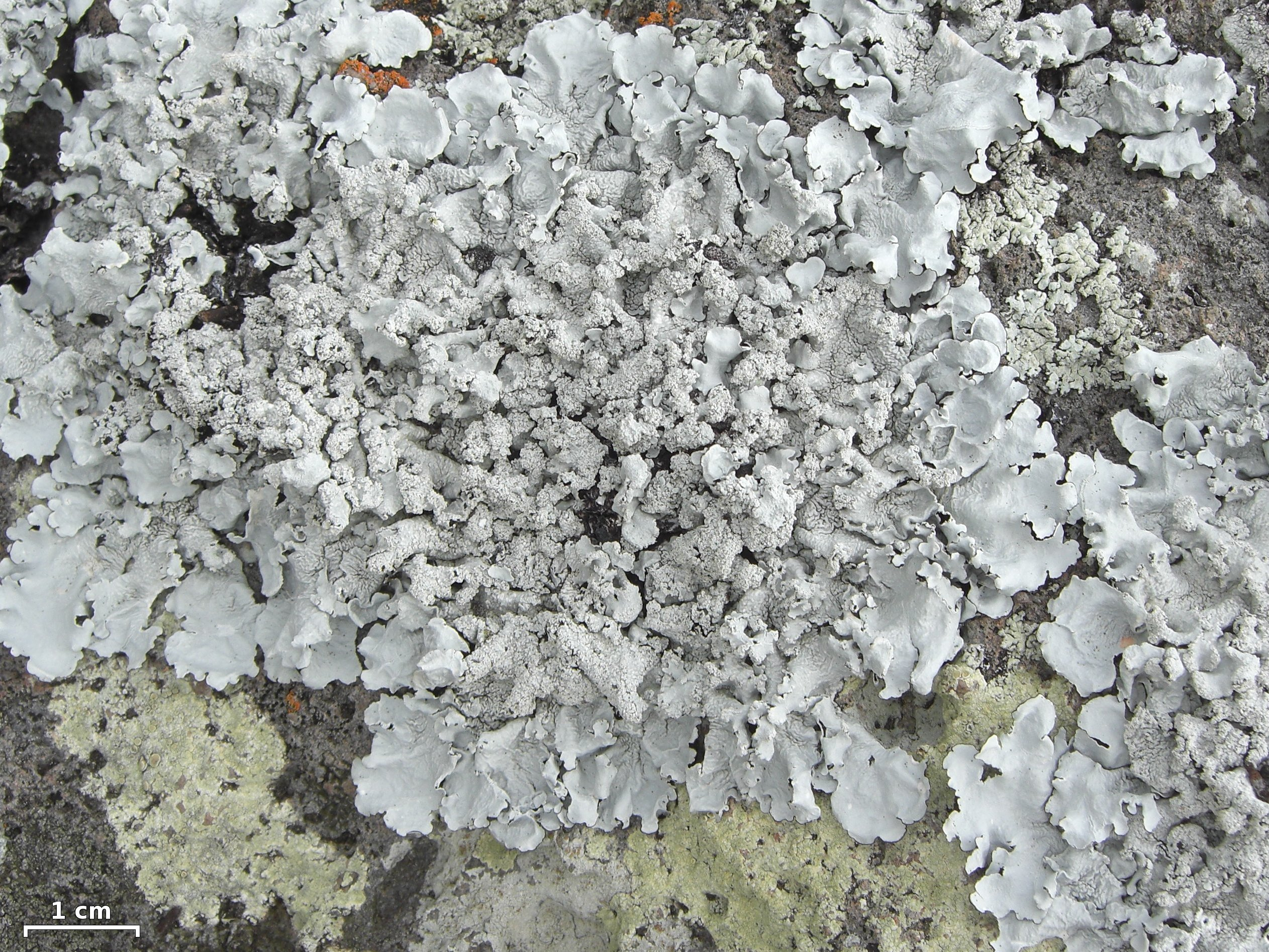
Canoparmelia raunkiaeri

- Canoparmelia alabamensis (Hale & McCull.) Elix (2001)
- Canoparmelia albomaculata C.H.Ribeiro & Marcelli (2002) – Brazil
- Canoparmelia amabilis Heiman & Elix (1999)
- Canoparmelia antedeluvialis (Brusse & Sipman) Elix (1997)
- Canoparmelia aptata (Kremp.) Elix & Hale (1986)
- Canoparmelia austroamericana Adler (1987)
- Canoparmelia caribaea (Hale) Elix & Hale (1986)
- Canoparmelia caroliniana (Nyl.) Elix & Hale (1986)
- Canoparmelia cassa Marcelli & C.H.Ribeiro (2002) – Brazil
- Canoparmelia concrescens (Vain.) Elix & Hale (1986)
- Canoparmelia consanguinea Marcelli, Canêz & Elix (2009) – Brazil
- Canoparmelia corrugativa (Kurok. & Filson) Elix & Hale (1986)
- Canoparmelia cryptochlorophaea (Hale) Elix & Hale (1986)
- Canoparmelia ecaperata (Müll.Arg.) Elix & Hale (1986)
- Canoparmelia epileuca (Hale) Elix & Hale (1986)
- Canoparmelia eruptens (Kurok.) Elix & Hale (1986)
- Canoparmelia herveyensis Elix (1993) – Australia
- Canoparmelia inornata (Hale) Elix & Hale (1986)
- Canoparmelia martinicana (Nyl.) Elix & Hale (1986)
- Canoparmelia nairobiensis (J.Steiner & Zahlbr.) Elix & Hale (1986)
- Canoparmelia nashii Jungbluth & Marcelli (2011)
- Canoparmelia owariensis (Asahina) Elix (1993)
- Canoparmelia pustulescens (Kurok.) Elix (1993)
- Canoparmelia pustulifera Benatti, S.M.Martins, C.Vos & Emily Holt (2017) – Brazil
- Canoparmelia quintarigera Aptroot (1991) – Magagascar
- Canoparmelia rarotongensis Louwhoff & Elix (2000) – Rarotonga
- Canoparmelia raunkiaeri (Vain.) Elix & Hale (1986)
- Canoparmelia rodriguesiana (Hue) Elix (1999)
- Canoparmelia roseoreagens Marcelli, Canêz & Elix (2009) – Brazil
- Canoparmelia rupicola (Lynge) Elix (2001)
- Canoparmelia sanguinea Marcelli, Benatti & Elix (2009) – Brazil
- Canoparmelia somaliensis (Müll.Arg.) Elix & Hale (1986)
- Canoparmelia subroseoreagens Marcelli, Canêz & Elix (2009) – Brazil
- Canoparmelia tamaulipensis T.H.Nash & R.-E.Pérez (2010)
- Canoparmelia terrapapia Elix (1999)
- Canoparmelia texana (Tuck.) Elix & Hale (1986)
- Canoparmelia zambiensis (Hale) Elix & Hale (1986)
- Canoparmelia zimbabwensis (Hale) Elix & Hale (1986)

The taxon once named Canoparmelia amazonica (Nyl.) Elix & Hale (1986) has been analysed molecularly and shown to belong in the genus Parmelinella.
