= Phlyctis psoromica =

Scientific classification
- Domain: Eukaryota
- Kingdom: Fungi
- Division: Ascomycota
- Class: Lecanoromycetes
- Order: Gyalectales
- Family: Phlyctidaceae
- Genus: Phlyctis
- Species: P. psoromica

Binomial name
- Phlyctis psoromica Elix & Kantvilas (2011)

Species of lichen-forming fungus

Phlyctis psoromica is a species of corticolous (bark-dwelling) crustose lichen in the family Phlyctidaceae. Native to New South Wales, Australia, it was described as new to science in 2011. This lichen is characterised by its whitish to pale blue-grey crustose thallus and distinctive secondary chemistry.

== Taxonomy ==
Phlyctis psoromica was first scientifically described by Australian lichenologists John Elix and Gintaras Kantvilas. The species is similar to Phlyctis subuncinata, P. sordidae, and P. uncinatae but contains psoromic acid and has smaller ascospores. The type specimen was collected by the first author from the Stockyard Creek Rest Area in Cottan-Bimbang National Park (New South Wales) at an altitude of 685 m (2,247 ft); there, in a wet Eucalyptus forest, it was found growing on Acacia.

== Description ==
The thallus of Phlyctis psoromica is crustose, 40–80 μm thick, and whitish to very pale blue-grey or greenish-grey in colour. It is rimose (cracked), scurfy or furfuraceous (covered in small flakes), and typically forms irregularly spreading patches 3–10 cm (1.2–3.9 in) wide. The lichen lacks isidia and soredia but often becomes ulcerous, eroded and granular near the apothecia. The photobiont is chlorococcoid with more or less spherical cells 6–12 μm wide.

Apothecia are 0.1–0.4 mm wide and usually aggregated in clusters. Ascospores are hyaline, fusiform, and transversely septate, measuring 30–52 μm long and 4–6 μm wide. The lichen's secondary chemistry includes psoromic acid, which is unique to this species among its close relatives.

=== Similar species ===
Phlyctis psoromica is morphologically similar to other species of Phlyctis, sharing a whitish, often scurfy thallus, immersed or clustered apothecia, 8-spored asci, and fusiform, transversely septate ascospores. However, it is distinguished from these species by its chemical composition. Related species such as P. subuncinata, P. uncinata, and P. sordida contain different lichen products and have larger ascospores. Phlyctis communis, found in India, also has transversely septate ascospores, but they typically have 7–14 septa and measure 18–33 by 6–9 μm. Another Indian species, Phlyctis monosperma, is chemically similar to P. psoromica but differs in having 1-spored asci with larger, 15-septate ascospores that are 140–150 μm long and 30–40 μm wide.

== Habitat and distribution ==
Phlyctis psoromica is known only from several locations in New South Wales, Australia. It is found on smooth bark of various hosts, such as Doryphora sassafras, Atherosperma moschatum, and species of Elaeocarpus and Pomaderris. The lichen thrives in shaded habitats on the trunks of understory trees in wet upland forests at elevations between 680 and 1,500 m (2,230 and 4,920 ft).
