= Phlyctis lueckingii =

Scientific classification
- Domain: Eukaryota
- Kingdom: Fungi
- Division: Ascomycota
- Class: Lecanoromycetes
- Order: Gyalectales
- Family: Phlyctidaceae
- Genus: Phlyctis
- Species: P. lueckingii

Binomial name
- Phlyctis lueckingii Weerakoon & Aptroot (2016)

Species of lichen

Phlyctis lueckingii is a species of corticolous (bark-dwelling) lichen in the family Phlyctidaceae. Found in Sri Lanka, it was formally described as a new species by Gothamie Weerakoon and André Aptroot in 2016. The type was collected on the Dothalugala mountain, where it was found in a rainforest on the smooth bark of a tree. The species epithet honours lichenologist Robert Lücking.

Characteristics of the lichen include its relatively large (0.2–0.3 mm in diameter), grey apothecia that occur in groups, and its fusiform (spindle-shaped) ascospores that have 7 septa and measure 27–29 by 5.5–6.5 μm. The thallus contains the lichen product norstictic acid.
