= Canoparmelia consanguinea =

Scientific classification
- Domain: Eukaryota
- Kingdom: Fungi
- Division: Ascomycota
- Class: Lecanoromycetes
- Order: Lecanorales
- Family: Parmeliaceae
- Genus: Canoparmelia
- Species: C. consanguinea

Binomial name
- Canoparmelia consanguinea Marcelli, Canêz & Elix (2009)

Species of lichen

Canoparmelia consanguinea is a species of saxicolous (rock-dwelling), foliose lichen in the family Parmeliaceae. Found in Brazil, it was formally described as a new species in 2009 by lichenologists Marcelo Marcelli, Luciana da Silva Canêz, and John Elix. The type specimen was collected from an open field in Fazenda da Estrela (Vacaria, Rio Grande do Sul) at an altitude of 920 m (3,020 ft), where it was growing on basaltic rock.

== Description ==
The thallus of Canoparmelia consanguinea is greenish-gray and lobed, with a width of up to 8.5 cm (3.3 in). The lobes are irregularly branched, loosely attached to the surface, and slightly overlap each other. The tips are rounded, and the edges are smooth or have slight waves. The surface can be smooth or slightly cracked in the middle and shiny. There are no lacinulae or pustulae present, but there are reticulate maculae (a type of marking) on the distal areas. The soralia (reproductive structures) are circular and black when old, found on both the surface and edges of the thallus. They produce granular soredia, which are persistent and stick together, eventually forming small, irregularly shaped structures called pseudoisidia or lobules. The medulla is white, and there is no purple pigment produced when exposed to K chemical. The lower surface of the thallus is black and can be dull or slightly shiny. It may have small bumps or be smooth in some parts. The outer edges are brown and can be smooth or slightly bumpy. The rhizines (root-like structures) are black, some with whitish tips, and can be simple or have a brush-like appearance.

Apothecia (another type of reproductive structure) are rare and flat, attached to the surface and have a diameter of 2.7 mm. The edges can be smooth or have soredia. The ascospores are ellipsoid and measure 10.0–12.5 by 5.0–6.0 μm with a thin outer layer (epispore) measuring 1.0 μm. Pycnidia (another reproductive structure) are immature and not visible in this species.

Major lichen products in Canoparmelia consanguinea are olivetolcarboxylic acid, decarboxynorstenosporic acid, and 4-O-demethylstenosporic acid; there are several other substances that occur in minor or trace amounts.
