= Canoparmelia rarotongensis =

Scientific classification
- Domain: Eukaryota
- Kingdom: Fungi
- Division: Ascomycota
- Class: Lecanoromycetes
- Order: Lecanorales
- Family: Parmeliaceae
- Genus: Canoparmelia
- Species: C. rarotongensis

Binomial name
- Canoparmelia rarotongensis Louwhoff & Elix (2000)

Species of lichen

Canoparmelia rarotongensis is a species of foliose lichen in the family Parmeliaceae. Found in Rarotonga (Cook Islands), it was formally described as a new species in 2000 by Simone Louwhoff and John Elix. The type specimen was collected by the second author from the Muri Lagoon (on the eastern coast of Rarotonga), where it was found growing on hibiscus along the foreshore. It is named for its type locality. The main physical characteristic that distinguishes it from others in its genus is its conspicuous isidia, which are consistently inflated and branched.

== Description ==
This lichen has a moderately attached, thin and flexible thallus that can grow up to 6 cm (2.4 in) wide. The lobes are unevenly shaped and connected in the centre, but separate near the tips, measuring 2–4 mm wide. The edges of the lobes are smooth and occasionally wavy, appearing flat, without any cilia. The top surface is a dusty grey-green colour, unevenly cracked in the centre with visible isidia, which are inflated and mostly branched, forming clusters that can be up to 0.5 mm wide and up to 0.8–1 mm high. The medulla is white, while the bottom surface is black and dull, with a narrow brown margin measuring up to 1 mm wide. The rhizines are black, not densely spread, and have a coarse and simple appearance. No apothecia or pycnidia were observed.

Canoparmelia rarotongensis produces atranorin, chloroatranorin in the cortex and lecanoric acid in the medulla as major lichen products, and trace amounts of orsellinic acid, and orcinol. Before this species, lecanoric acid had not been reported to occur in the genus Canoparmelia. The expected results of standard chemical spot tests are K+ (yellow) in the cortex, and K−, C+ (red), PD− in the medulla.
