= Canoparmelia cassa =

Scientific classification
- Domain: Eukaryota
- Kingdom: Fungi
- Division: Ascomycota
- Class: Lecanoromycetes
- Order: Lecanorales
- Family: Parmeliaceae
- Genus: Canoparmelia
- Species: C. cassa

Binomial name
- Canoparmelia cassa Marcelli & Kalb (2002)

Species of lichen

Canoparmelia cassa is a species of foliose lichen in the family Parmeliaceae. This species is characteristic by the occurrence of isidia together with fatty acids. It is similar externally to Canoparmelia amazonica. Its epithet cassa is derived from the Latin cassus, meaning "devoid", due to this species' lack of medullar reactive substances.

== Description ==
It possesses a whitish-green thallus that measures 8 centimetres (3.1 in) wide, its lobes measuring between 1 and 2 millimetres (0.039 and 0.079 in) wide. Its surface is continuous, laterally overlapping and adnate, being dichotomously ramified. The species' axillary sinus is oval, it counts with rounded apices, and a black-lined margin with no cilia. It shows no lacinules while possessing laminal maculae.

Its isidia are also laminal and cylindrical, being between 0.2 and 0.6 mm high. Its medulla is white, while its underside possesses a rugose, veined and papillate margin. Its central surface is black and also papillate. Its rhizines are dimorphic, measuring between 0.1 to 0.4 millimetres (0.0039 to 0.0157 in) long, being coloured black and with a frequent distribution. Apothecia and pycnidia are absent in Canoparmelia cassa.

== Habitat ==
This species was first found in the Parque Natural do Caraça, in Minas Gerais, at an altitude of 1,330 metres (4,360 ft) on a tree in a light forest.
