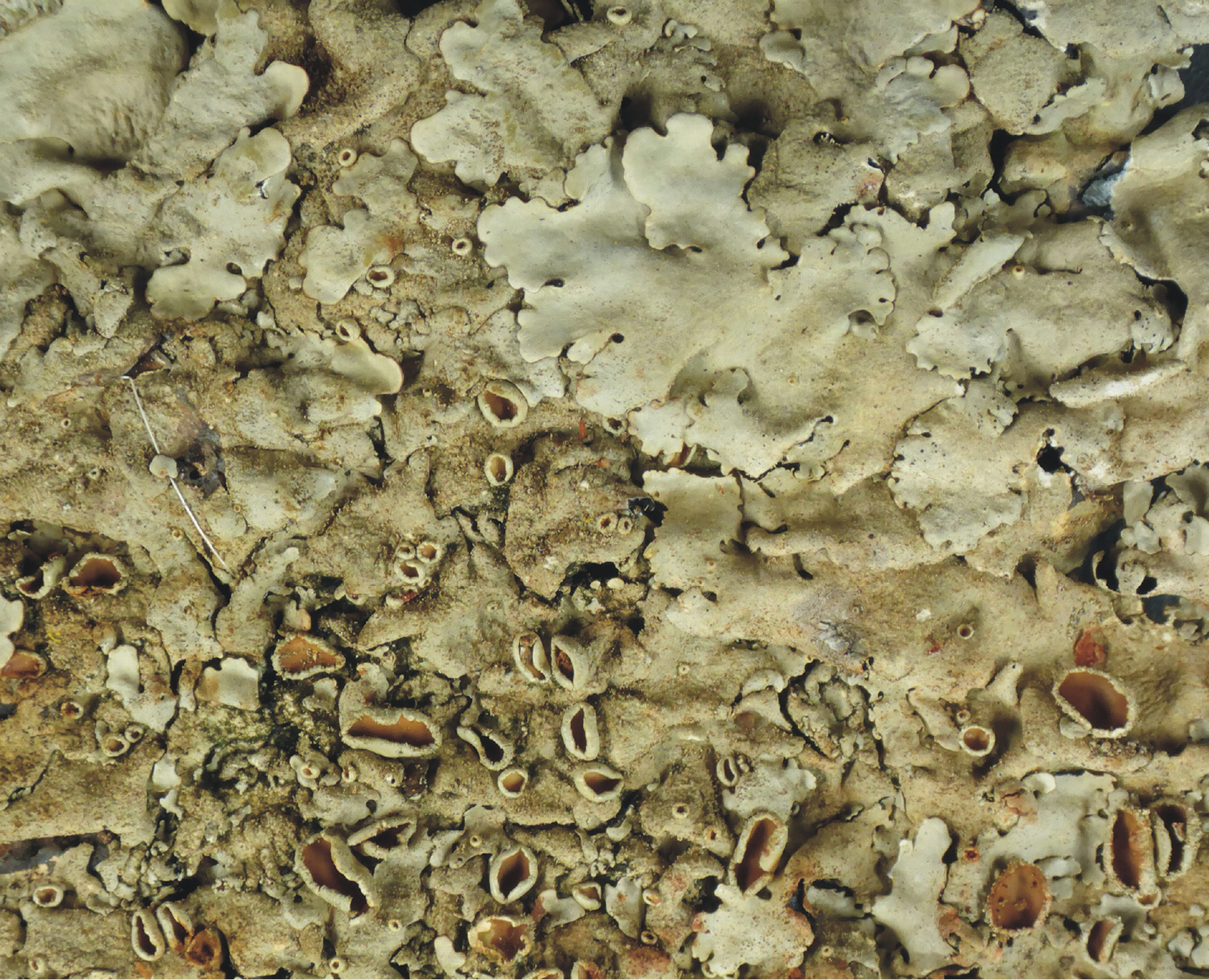
- Image of the holotype specimen

Scientific classification
- Domain: Eukaryota
- Kingdom: Fungi
- Division: Ascomycota
- Class: Lecanoromycetes
- Order: Lecanorales
- Family: Parmeliaceae
- Genus: Parmelinella
- Species: P. schimperiana

Binomial name
- Parmelinella schimperiana Kirika & Divakar (2016)

= Parmelinella schimperiana =

Species of lichen

Parmelinella schimperiana is a species of foliose lichen in the family Parmeliaceae. It is found in Kenya, Cameroon, and South India, where it typically grows on bark, but less frequently on rock.

== Taxonomy ==
The lichen was described as a new species in 2016 by lichenologists Paul Kirika and Pradeep Divakar. The type specimen was collected near Ngutwa village, Wote (Eastern Province, Kenya). Here it was found growing on bark in dry woodland. The specific epithet schimperiana honours German botanist Georg Wilhelm Schimper, who was the first to scientifically collect lichens in East Africa.

== Description ==
Parmelinella schimperiana is a greyish-green, foliose (leafy) species measuring 3–7 cm (1.2–2.8 in) across. The lobes comprising the thallus are somewhat irregularly branched and measure 3–8 mm (0.12–0.31 in) wide with rounded or scalloped edges. The results of standard chemical spot test are cortex K+ (yellow); medulla K+ (yellow turning red), C−, KC−, P+ (orange-red). Secondary chemicals present in the lichen are secalonic acid A and atranorin in the upper cortex and salazinic acid in the medulla.

The lichen resembles the widely distributed species Parmelinella wallichiana, but has smaller ascospores (measuring 5–10 by 5–7.5 μm compared to 15–20 by 9–14 μm in P. wallichiana) and a more restricted distribution.
