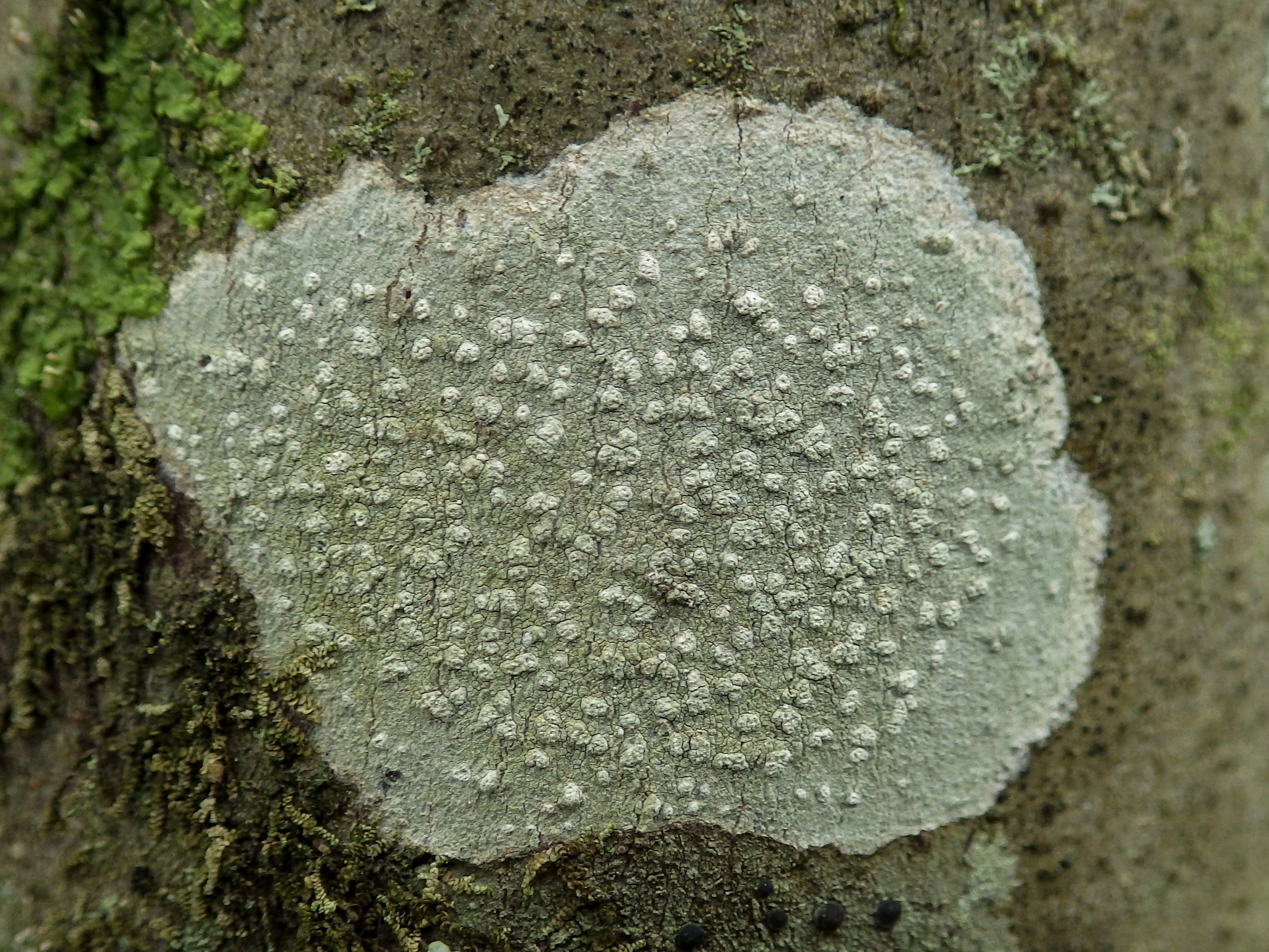
- Phlyctis agelaea

Scientific classification
- Kingdom: Fungi
- Division: Ascomycota
- Class: Lecanoromycetes
- Order: Gyalectales
- Family: Phlyctidaceae
- Genus: Phlyctis (Wallr.) Flot. (1850)

Type species
- Phlyctis agelaea (Ach.) Flot. (1850)

Synonyms
- List: Comocheila A.Massal. (1860); Dactyloblastus Trevis. (1853); Dyctyoblastus Kremp. (1869); Micromium Pers. (1811); Peltigera sect. Phlyctis Wallr. (1831); Phlyctella Kremp. (1876); Phlyctellomyces Cif. & Tomas. (1953); Phlyctidia Müll.Arg. (1880); Phlyctidia Müll.Arg. ex Zahlbr. (1907); Phlyctidia Müll.Arg. (1895); Phlyctidomyces E.A.Thomas ex Cif. & Tomas. (1953); Phlyctomia A.Massal. (1860)

= Phlyctis =

Genus of lichen-forming fungi

Phlyctis is a genus of lichen-forming fungi in the order Gyalectales, and the type genus of the family Phlyctidaceae. Members of the genus are commonly called whitewash lichens. These parasitic lichens typically form very thin, patchy crusts on host surfaces or live almost entirely within their hosts, producing minute fruiting bodies that remain largely hidden beneath a coarse white pruina. The genus is characterised by spores that are densely divided by many walls into a net-like pattern and often have tiny points at their ends. Phlyctis contains about 20 species distributed worldwide, with several new species having been discovered in recent years, particularly from India, Australia, and other tropical regions.

== Taxonomy ==
Phlyctis was initially circumscribed by Karl Friedrich Wilhelm Wallroth in 1831 as a section of the genus Peltigera. The German lichenologist Julius von Flotow promoted it to distinct genus status in 1850. The Dictionary of the Fungi (2008) estimated the widespread genus to contain 12 species, but several species have been described and added to the genus since then.

== Description ==
Phlyctis species are lichen parasites that either form a very thin, patchy crust on the host surface or lie almost entirely within it. When present, the thallus is smooth to slightly cracked, pale green-white to grey-green when fresh and fading to cream or pale brown as it dries; a delicate white prothallus often outlines the colony. The photosynthetic partner is a minute green alga of the genus Symbiochloris. Some species produce powdery soredia, which may remain as discrete dots or merge into larger, grainy patches.

The sexual fruiting bodies are minute apothecia that stay immersed in the host thallus, only barely emerging at maturity. Their entire surface can be hidden beneath a coarse white frost (pruina). A thin, irregular thalline rim borders the disc, while the proper exciple is poorly developed. The epithecium carries granular, pale-brown pigment, and both the hymenium and subhymenium are colourless to faint brown. Slender paraphyses thread the hymenium; they branch only near the tips, have indistinct septa, and end in slightly swollen cells.

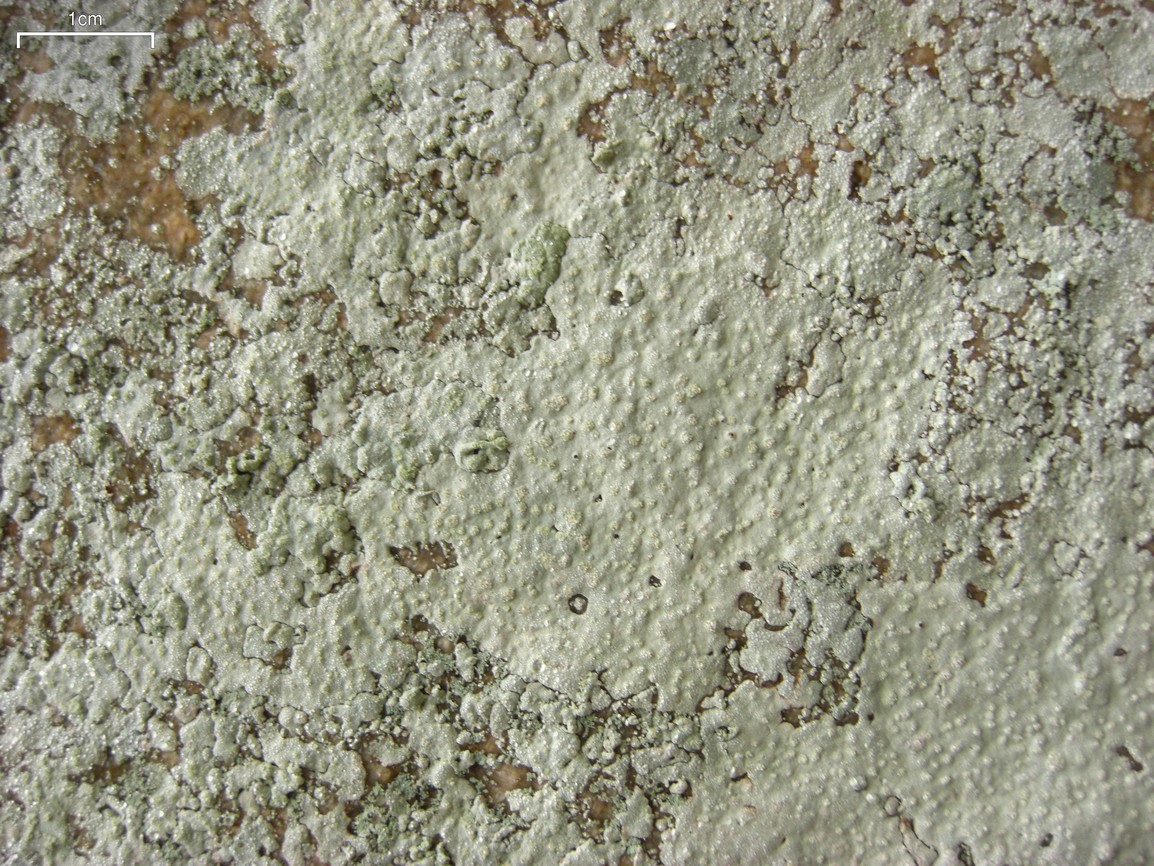
Phlyctis petraea

Asci are broadly club-shaped, have thin walls that stain weakly blue in the potassium–iodide test, and contain one, two, four or eight ascospores. The spores themselves are densely muriform—divided by many transverse and longitudinal walls—ellipsoidal to nearly spherical, often with tiny points at one or both ends. They start colourless and may turn pale yellow-brown when over-mature, and each is surrounded by a very thin, iodine-positive sheath.

Asexual reproduction occurs in dark, partially immersed pycnidia. These may contain several chambers and release colourless, rod-shaped conidia produced from short, bottle-shaped cells. No characteristic secondary metabolites have been detected in the genus using thin-layer chromatography.

== Species ==
As of January 2026, Species Fungorum (in the Catalogue of Life) accepts 25 species of Phlyctis.

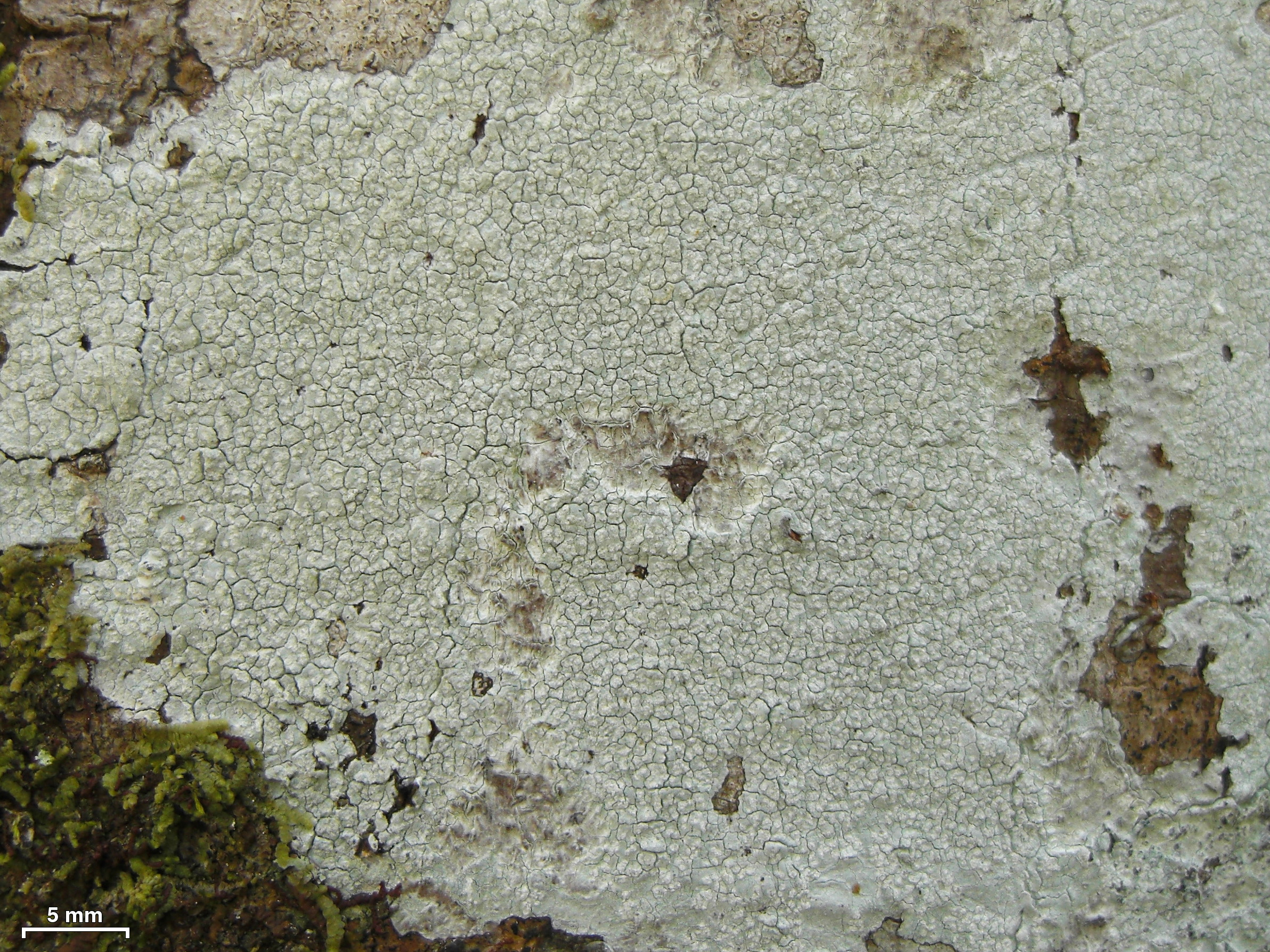
Phlyctis boliviensis

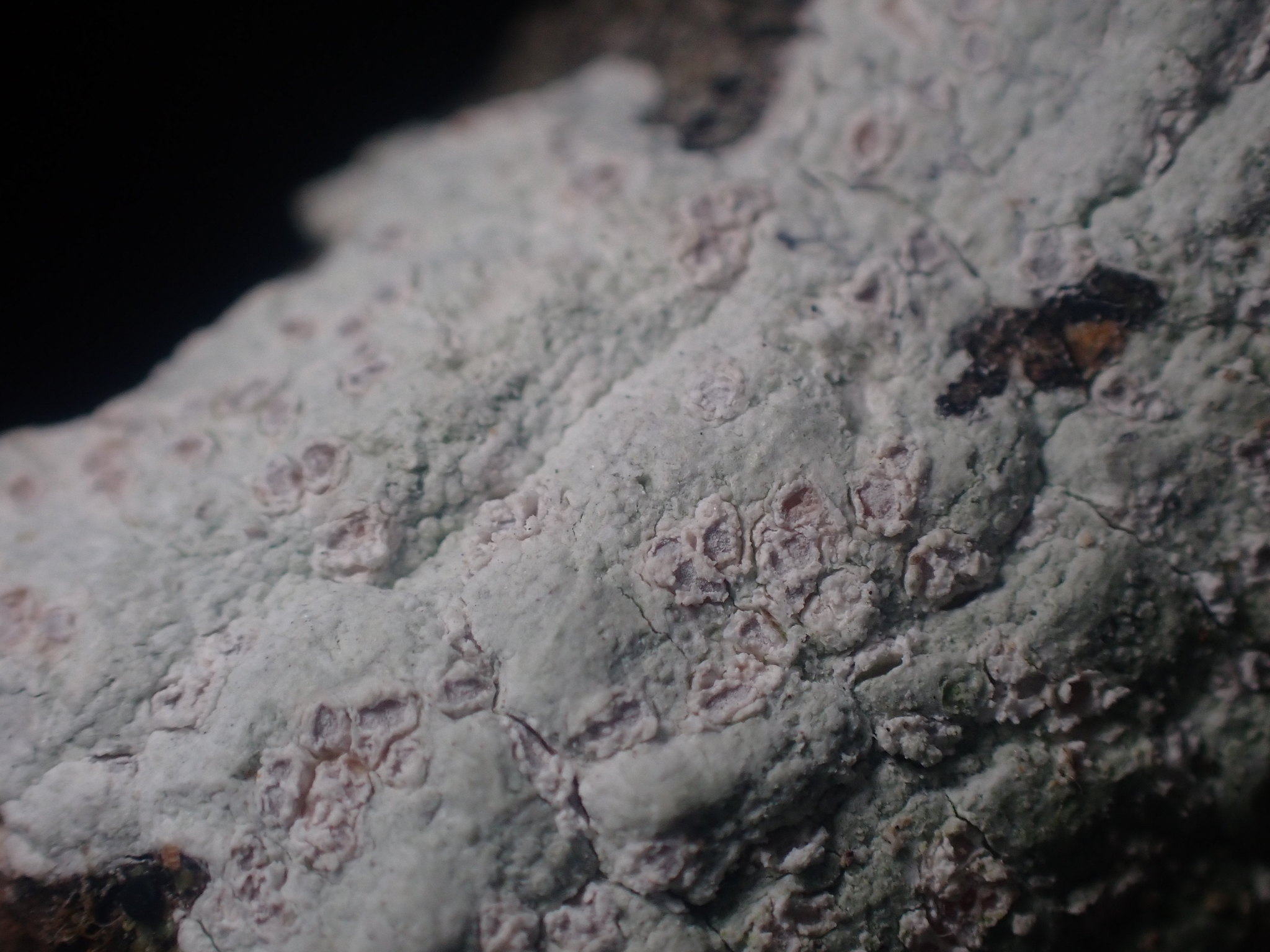
Phlyctis uncinata

- Phlyctis agelaea (Ach.) Flot. (1850)
- Phlyctis antaxia Nyl. (1888)
- Phlyctis argena (Ach.) Flot. (1850)
- Phlyctis atomella (Stirt.) S.Joseph, G.P.Sinha & Nayaka (2020)
- Phlyctis boliviensis Nyl. (1859)
- Phlyctis brasiliensis Nyl. (1869)
- Phlyctis caesioalba Flot. (1850)
- Phlyctis candida Zahlbr. (1932)
- Phlyctis communis Chitale & Makhija (2012) – India
- Phlyctis endecamera (Nyl.) Lücking & Sipman (2021)
- Phlyctis himalayensis (Nyl.) D.D.Awasthi (2000)
- Phlyctis italica Garov. (1860)
- Phlyctis karnatakana S.Joshi & Upreti (2010) – India
- Phlyctis ludoviciensis Müll.Arg. ex Lendemer (2005)
- Phlyctis lueckingii Weerakoon & Aptroot (2016) – Sri Lanka
- Phlyctis macquariensis C.W.Dodge (1968)
- Phlyctis monosperma S.Joshi & Upreti (2012) – India
- Phlyctis nepalensis Räsänen (1952)
- Phlyctis norvegica Norman (1884)
- Phlyctis offula Kremp. (1874)
- Phlyctis perpityrea Erichsen (1943)
- Phlyctis petraea R.C.Harris, Muscavitch, Ladd & Lendemer (2017)
- Phlyctis polyphora Stirt. (1881)
- Phlyctis psoromica Elix & Kantvilas (2011) – Australia
- Phlyctis pulveracea I.M.Lamb (1953)
- Phlyctis schizospora Zahlbr. (1930)
- Phlyctis sepulta A.Massal. (1856)
- Phlyctis sirindhorniae Poengs., Vongshew. & Lumbsch (2019)
- Phlyctis speirea G.Merr. (1913)
- Phlyctis subagelaea S.Joshi & Upreti (2010) – India
- Phlyctis subargena R.Ma & H.Y.Wang (2011) – China
- Phlyctis subhimalayensis S.Joshi & Upreti (2012) – India
- Phlyctis subuncinata Stirt. (1875)
- Phlyctis tolgensis P.M.McCarthy & Elix (2017) – Australia
- Phlyctis uncinata Stirt. (1875)
