= Penicillium oxalicum =

Scientific classification
- Kingdom: Fungi
- Division: Ascomycota
- Class: Eurotiomycetes
- Order: Eurotiales
- Family: Aspergillaceae
- Genus: Penicillium
- Species: P. oxalicum

Binomial name
- Penicillium oxalicum Currie, J.N.; Thom, C. 1915

Type strain
- ATCC 1126, Biourge 88, CBS 219.30, FRR 0787, IHEM 5931, IMI 192332, KCTC 6440, MUCL 29047, NRRL 787, NRRL A-1961, QM 7606, Thom 103

Synonyms
- Penicillium oxalicus

Species of fungus

Penicillium oxalicum is an anamorph species of the genus Penicillium which was isolated from rhizosphere soil of pearl millet. Penicillium oxalicum produces secalonic acid D, chitinase, oxalic acid, oxaline and β-N-acetylglucosaminidase and occurs widespread in food and tropical commodities. This fungus could be used against soilborne diseases like downy mildew of tomatoes
