= Psathyrophlyctis =

Scientific classification
- Domain: Eukaryota
- Kingdom: Fungi
- Division: Ascomycota
- Class: Lecanoromycetes
- Order: Gyalectales
- Family: Phlyctidaceae
- Genus: Psathyrophlyctis; Brusse (1987)

Type species
- Psathyrophlyctis serpentaria Brusse (1987)

Genus of fungi

Psathyrophlyctis is a genus of lichenized fungi in family Phlyctidaceae (order Gyalectales). The genus is monotypic, containing the single species Psathyrophlyctis serpentaria, found in South Africa.
