= Canoparmelia albomaculata =

Scientific classification
- Domain: Eukaryota
- Kingdom: Fungi
- Division: Ascomycota
- Class: Lecanoromycetes
- Order: Lecanorales
- Family: Parmeliaceae
- Genus: Canoparmelia
- Species: C. albomaculata

Binomial name
- Canoparmelia albomaculata Marcelli & Kalb (2002)

Species of lichen

Canoparmelia albomaculata is a species of lichen in the family Parmeliaceae. This species is very similar to the apostulate Canoparmelia caroliniana, showing the same colour, size and reticulate maculae. C. caroliniana, however, has true isidia. Big coralloid pustules that in some cases become sorediate are a characteristic feature for C. albomaculata.

== Description ==
It possesses a whitish-green thallus that measures 8 centimetres (3.1 in) wide, its adnate lobes measuring between 1 and 3 millimetres (0.039 and 0.118 in) wide. Its surface is smooth and irregularly cracked. The species' ramification is irregularly dichotomous, with rounded apices, an oval axillary sinus, and a black-lined margin with no cilia. It shows no lacinules while possessing laminal maculae.

Its pustulae are found as marginal and submarginal, its coralloid being isidioid, at times exhibiting granular soredia apically. Its medulla is white, while its underside possesses a rugose and veined light brown center, as well as a rugose, veined and papillate margin. Its rhizines are simple, measuring between 0.3 to 0.8 millimetres (0.012 to 0.031 in) long, being coloured brown and being few in number. Apothecia and pycnidia are absent in Canoparmelia albomaculata.

== Habitat ==
This species was first found in the Parque Natural do Caraça, in Minas Gerais, at an altitude of 1,330 metres (4,360 ft) on a tree in a light forest.
