= Parmotrema upretii =

Scientific classification
- Domain: Eukaryota
- Kingdom: Fungi
- Division: Ascomycota
- Class: Lecanoromycetes
- Order: Lecanorales
- Family: Parmeliaceae
- Genus: Parmotrema
- Species: P. upretii

Binomial name
- Parmotrema upretii Divakar (2003)

Species of lichen

Parmotrema upretii is a species of saxicolous (rock-dwelling), foliose lichen in the family Parmeliaceae. Found in India, it was described as new to science in 2003 by Pradeep Divakar. The type specimen was collected near Banjar in the Kullu district of Himachal Pradesh, India at an altitude of 1,700 m (5,600 ft), where it was found growing on rock. The species epithet honours Indian lichenologist Dalip Kumar Upreti, who collected the type specimen.

== Description ==
The lichen has a thallus that is loosely attached, measuring around 10 cm (4 in) in diameter. The lobes are circular, ranging from 5–10 mm (0.2–0.4 in) in width and around 150–170 μm in thickness. The margins are smooth and lack cilia. The upper surface is mineral grey in color, smooth, without any visible spots or marks, and has a lobulate-isidiate texture. The lobules are present on the lamina, and in some cases, near the margins. Initially, they are granular and have black tips, resembling isidia. However, they soon become flat, dorsiventral, and horizontal. The size of the lobules can be up to 1.5 mm in width and 1 mm in height, with more or less dichotomously divided margins and no cilia. The medulla is white, around 75–100 μm thick. The lower surface is black and smooth. The margin of the lower surface measures approximately 4–6 mm wide and has a shiny, rhizine-free, pale brown zone. The center of the lower surface is sparsely rhizinate, and the rhizines are black, simple, and up to 1 mm long, present in the center. There is no visible sign of apothecia and pycnidia.

Atranorin and gyrophoric acid are two lichen products that occur in Parmotrema upretii. The expected results of chemical spot tests are K+ (yellow) in the cortex, and K−, C+ (red), KC+ (red) and P− in the medulla.

== Habitat and distribution ==
Parmotrema upretii has been observed to grow exclusively on rocks in areas with high exposure, at elevations between approximately 1,400 and 1,700 m (4,600 and 5,600 ft). In addition to Himachal Pradesh, it has also been recorded in Madhya Pradesh.

== See also ==
- List of Parmotrema species
