= Myelochroa salazinica =

Scientific classification
- Domain: Eukaryota
- Kingdom: Fungi
- Division: Ascomycota
- Class: Lecanoromycetes
- Order: Lecanorales
- Family: Parmeliaceae
- Genus: Myelochroa
- Species: M. salazinica

Binomial name
- Myelochroa salazinica Sheng L.Wang, J.B.Chen & Elix (2001)

Species of lichen

Myelochroa salazinica is a species of foliose lichen in the family Parmeliaceae. Found in China, it was described as a new species in 2001 by Sheng-Lan Wang, Jian-Bin Chen, and John Alan Elix.

== Taxonomy ==
The type specimen was collected from Mount Gongshan (Yunnan) at an altitude of 1,500 m (4,900 ft); here it was found growing on a rock. Its specific epithet refers to the presence of salazinic acid, a secondary chemical rare in Myelochroa, and at the time of its publication, the only member of the genus to contain this chemical as the main metabolite of the medulla.

== Description ==
Myelochroa salazinica has a foliose (leafy), pale mineral-grey thallus measuring 5–6 cm (2.0–2.4 in) wide. It lacks isidia but has regions of soredia around the margins of the thallus that sometimes coalesce into large soralia. The medulla is white to yellow. The thallus undersurface is black, with many simple (unbranched) black rhizines that functions as holdfasts. In addition to salazinic acid, zeorin, and leucotylic acid as the major secondary compounds, the lichen also contains minor amounts of atranorin and consalazinic acid, and trace amounts of galbinic acid and pigmentosin B.

== Habitat and distribution ==
Myelochroa salazinica is found in a few locations in Yunnan, China. It has been recorded growing both on rock and on bark, and at elevations ranging from 1,200 to 3,200 m (3,900 to 10,500 ft).
