= Geodin =

Names
- IUPAC name Methyl (2R)-5,7-dichloro-4-hydroxy-5'-methoxy-6-methyl-3,3'-dioxospiro[1-benzofuran-2,6'-cyclohexa-1,4-diene]-1'-carboxylate
- Other names: Estin; Erdin methyl ester

Identifiers
CAS Number	427-63-4
3D model (JSmol)	Interactive image
ChEBI	CHEBI:150867
ChEMBL	ChEMBL1956530
ChemSpider	8062819
PubChem CID	9887146
UNII	4293R7B06X
CompTox Dashboard (EPA)	DTXSID80962632
- InChI: InChI=1S/C17H12Cl2O7/c1-6-11(18)13(21)10-14(12(6)19)26-17(15(10)22)8(16(23)25-3)4-7(20)5-9(17)24-2/h4-5,21H,1-3H3/t17-/m1/s1 Key: LUBKKVGXMXTXOZ-QGZVFWFLSA-N
- SMILES: CC1=C(C(=C2C(=C1Cl)O[C@]3(C2=O)C(=CC(=O)C=C3OC)C(=O)OC)O)Cl

Properties
Chemical formula	C_{17}H_{12}Cl_{2}O_{7}
Molar mass	399.18 g·mol^{−1}
- Except where otherwise noted, data are given for materials in their standard state (at 25 °C [77 °F], 100 kPa). Infobox references

Geodin is an antibiotic against Gram-positive bacteria with the molecular formula C_{17}H_{8}Cl_{2}O_{7}. Geodin is produced by the fungus Aspergillus terreus.
