= Canoparmelia roseoreagens =

Scientific classification
- Domain: Eukaryota
- Kingdom: Fungi
- Division: Ascomycota
- Class: Lecanoromycetes
- Order: Lecanorales
- Family: Parmeliaceae
- Genus: Canoparmelia
- Species: C. roseoreagens

Binomial name
- Canoparmelia roseoreagens Marcelli, Canêz & Elix (2009)

Species of lichen

Canoparmelia roseoreagens is a species of corticolous (bark-dwelling), foliose lichen in the family Parmeliaceae.

== Taxonomy ==
Found in Brazil, it was formally described as a new species in 2009 by the lichenologists Marcelo Marcelli, Luciana da Silva Canêz, and John Elix. The type specimen was collected from a Brazilian pine forest in Fazenda da Estrela (Vacaria, Rio Grande do Sul) at an elevation of 905 m (2,969 ft), where it was found growing on tree bark.

== Description ==
This lichen has a greyish appearance and is sublaciniate, meaning it has irregularly branched lobes that are adnate (attached) and contiguous (touching), with truncate apices and a smooth to crenate margin. The upper surface is smooth and may have weak or absent maculae, which are reticulate (net-like), more evident in the young parts and may form small cracks. There are no lacinules, pustules or soredia. The isidia are the same colour as the thallus, cylindrical, and erect, ranging from simple to mostly coralloid, brown, and measuring 0.10–0.45 mm wide.

The medulla is white and does not produce a purple pigment when treated with K. The lower surface is black to dark brown, slightly shiny, and rugose (wrinkled); the marginal zone is brown, shiny, and rugose (or sometimes papillate); the rhizines (root-like structures) are white, dark brown, or rarely black, simple to furcate (forked), 0.25–0.50 mm long, few to frequent, and almost evenly distributed. There are no apothecia (cup-like sexual reproductive structures) or pycnidia (small asexual reproductive structures).

Canoparmelia roseoreagens contains several major lichen products: methyl olivetolcarboxylate, methyl divarinolcarboxylate, and eight unknown depsides that are derivatives of norsekikaic acid, norhomosekikaic acid, and norhyperhomosekikaic acids. The species epithet roseoreagens refers to the C+ (rose) chemical spot test reaction observed on the medulla.

== Habitat and distribution ==
Originally described from specimens collected in the Fazenda da Estrela in Northern Brazil, this corticolous (bark-dwelling) species has since been recorded from São Maurício (Braço do Norte, Santa Catarina) in Southern Brazil.
