= Julius von Flotow =

German lichenologist (1788–1856)

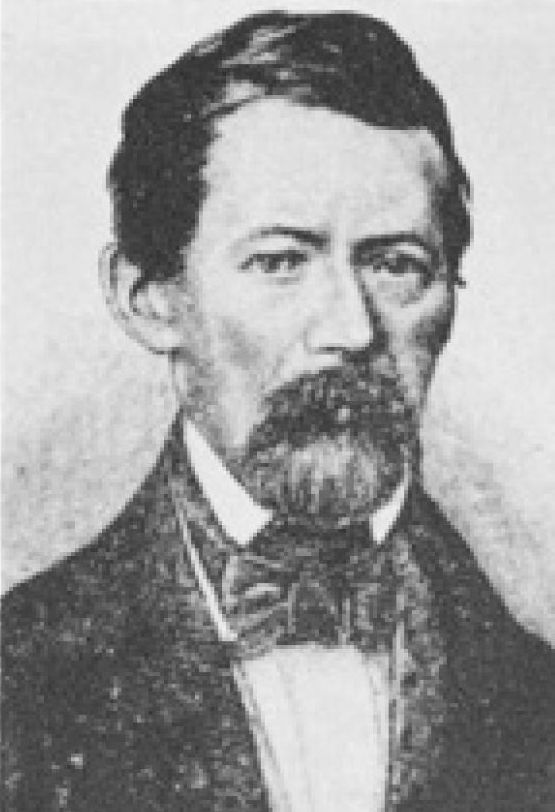
Julius von Flotow

Julius von Flotow; full name- Julius Christian Gottlieb Ulrich Gustav Georg Adam Ernst Friedrich von Flotow (9 March 1788 – 15 August 1856) was a German military officer, botanist, lichenologist, and bryologist. Following a serious injury at the Battle of Lützen in 1813 that left his right arm partially paralysed, von Flotow developed his botanical interests during his convalescence and subsequent military service in France. After retiring from the Prussian cavalry in 1832, he settled in Hirschberg (now Jelenia Góra, Poland), where he advanced knowledge of the local lichen funga. His contributions included producing exsiccata (dried herbarium specimen) collections, describing numerous lichen genera and species, coining the term epithecium, and mentoring lichenologists such as Gustav Wilhelm Körber. A member of several learned societies, von Flotow was awarded the Iron Cross and received an honorary doctorate from the University of Breslau shortly before his death. His extensive herbarium was acquired by the Botanical Museum in Berlin-Dahlem but was largely destroyed during World War II bombings.

== Biography ==
Von Flotow was born on 9 March 1788 in the village of Pitzerwitz (Pstrowice in Polish) in the region of Neumark. In 1813, he suffered a serious war injury at the Battle of Lützen, from which he never fully recovered and which led to a partial paralysis of his right arm. During a military campaign in France (1819), he took the opportunity to study lichens native to the Ardennes Mountains. In 1829, he started to edit and distribute the exsiccata Lichenes exsiccati. Lichenen, vorzüglich in Schlesien, der Mark und Pommern gesammelt von Julius von Flotow ("Dried lichens. Lichens, primarily collected in Silesia, the March [Brandenburg], and Pomerania by Julius von Flotow"). In 1850 he wrote of how his acquisition of a high-quality Schiek microscope enhanced his studies. In an 1851 study of the crustose lichen Rimularia gibbosa, he introduced the term epithecium. In 1832, he took an early retirement from the military and worked as a private scholar in Hirschberg. Among his written works are the following:

- Flotow, J. von (1820). "Bemerkungen über einige in Frankreich, besonders um St. Mihiel im Department de la Meuse gesammelten Lichenen". Jahrbücher der Gewächskunde (Sprengel, Schrader & Link) (in German). 1 (3): 94–156.
- Flotow, J. von (1836). "Reisebericht über eine Exkursion nach einem Theile des südöstlichen Riesengebirges". Flora (in German). 19 (1): 1–60.
- Flotow, J. von 1850: Lichenes Florae Silesiae. Uebersicht der Arbeiten und Veränderungen der Schlesische Gesellschaft für vaterländische Kultur "1849": 98 –135; [continued in] Jahresbericht der Schlesische Gesellschaft für vaterländische Kultur 28: 115–143.

Von Flotow was a member of several learned societies, including the Leopoldina and the Senckenberg Nature Research Society. He was a recipient of the Iron Cross and was awarded an honorary degree from the University of Breslau in 1856, a week before his death. The genus Flotovia from the botanical family Asteraceae is named in his honour.

== Research contributions and legacy ==
Following his retirement from the Prussian cavalry in 1824, Flotow settled in Jelenia Góra (Hirschberg im Riesengebirge), near the Giant Mountains (Karkonosze), where he advanced the understanding of the local lichen funga. Flotow's botanical interests had originally been encouraged by Pastor Neuschild in his youth, and his dedication fully developed after he was severely wounded at the Battle of Großgörschen in 1813. During his convalescence in Teplice and Kudowa, he met prominent botanists Kurt Sprengel and Johann Christian Günther, who guided his early interest in lichens and mosses. He served in military campaigns in France (Saint-Michel, 1819–1820) before officially retiring from active military service in 1832 as a major. Between 1825 and 1850, he authored eleven scholarly articles detailing his lichenological findings and taxonomy. His extensive herbarium was later acquired by the Botanical Museum in Berlin-Dahlem, though it was destroyed during World War II bombings in 1943. However, several specimens from Flotow's collection remain preserved in the herbarium of Wrocław University.

Flotow was instrumental in describing numerous lichen genera and species, including Catapyrenium, Sarcogyne, and Phlyctis, as well as species such as Arthothelium spectabile, Cladonia arbuscula, and Phlyctis argena. His international herbarium exchanges were extensive, involving lichenologists from Europe, Canada, the Caribbean, Brazil, Chile, southern Africa, India, Java, and the Philippines. He was also influential through mentoring the renowned lichenologist Gustav Wilhelm Körber, author of the seminal work Systema Lichenum Germaniae. Flotow's foundational work made a lasting impact on subsequent generations of lichenologists and contributed to the lichenological documentation of Central Europe. His favoured research sites included the Giant Mountains, and he also collected extensively in the Jeseníky Mountains and Králický Sněžník (now Czech Republic). Shortly before his death, on 15 August 1856, he received an honorary doctorate from the University of Wrocław. Several species honouring him were named, including Gyalecta flotowii.

== See also ==
- Category:Taxa named by Julius von Flotow
