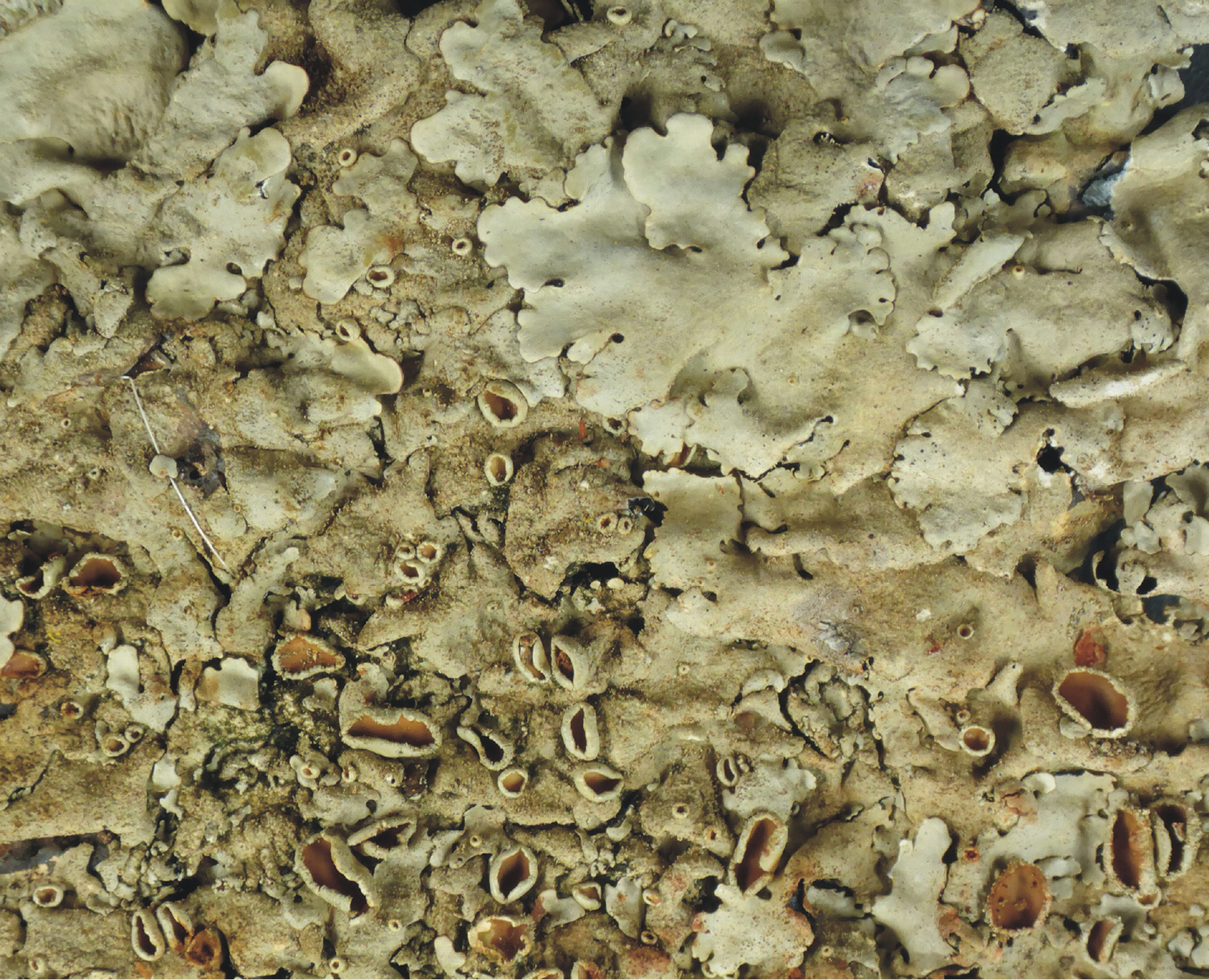
- Parmelinella schimperiana

Scientific classification
- Domain: Eukaryota
- Kingdom: Fungi
- Division: Ascomycota
- Class: Lecanoromycetes
- Order: Lecanorales
- Family: Parmeliaceae
- Genus: Parmelinella; Elix & Hale (1987)

Type species
- Parmelinella wallichiana (Taylor) Elix & Hale (1987)

= Parmelinella =

Genus of fungi

Parmelinella is a genus of lichen belonging to the family Parmeliaceae. The genus was circumscribed in 1987 by John Elix and Mason Hale as a segregate of Parmelina, from which it differs in having larger ascospores and containing salazinic acid. Although the genus had been assumed to be well-defined morphologically, a 2021 molecular phylogenetic study suggests that the generic delimitations need to be revised.

== Species ==
- Parmelinella afrocetrata (Elix, Eb.Fischer & Killmann) Marcelli & A.A.Spielm. (2020)
- Parmelinella chozoubae (Kr.P.Singh & G.P.Sinha) Elix & Pooprang (1999) – Asia
- Parmelinella cinerascens (Lynge) Benatti & Marcelli (2012) – South America
- Parmelinella inexplicabilis Marcelli & C.H.Ribeiro (2002)
- Parmelinella manipurensis (Kr.P.Singh) Elix & Hale (1987)
- Parmelinella mutata (Vain.) Benatti (2014) – South America
- Parmelinella nimandairana (Zahlbr.) Benatti & Marcelli (2014) – Africa; Asia
- Parmelinella salacinifera (Hale) Marcelli & Benatti (2014) – North America; Central America; South America; Caribbean islands; Thailand
- Parmelinella schimperiana Kirika & Divakar (2016) – Kenya
- Parmelinella simplicior (Hale) Elix & Hale (1987) – Africa; Asia
- Parmelinella versiformis (Kremp.) Marcelli (1993) – South America
- Parmelinella wallichiana (Taylor) Elix & Hale (1987) – Africa; Asia; Australia; South America
