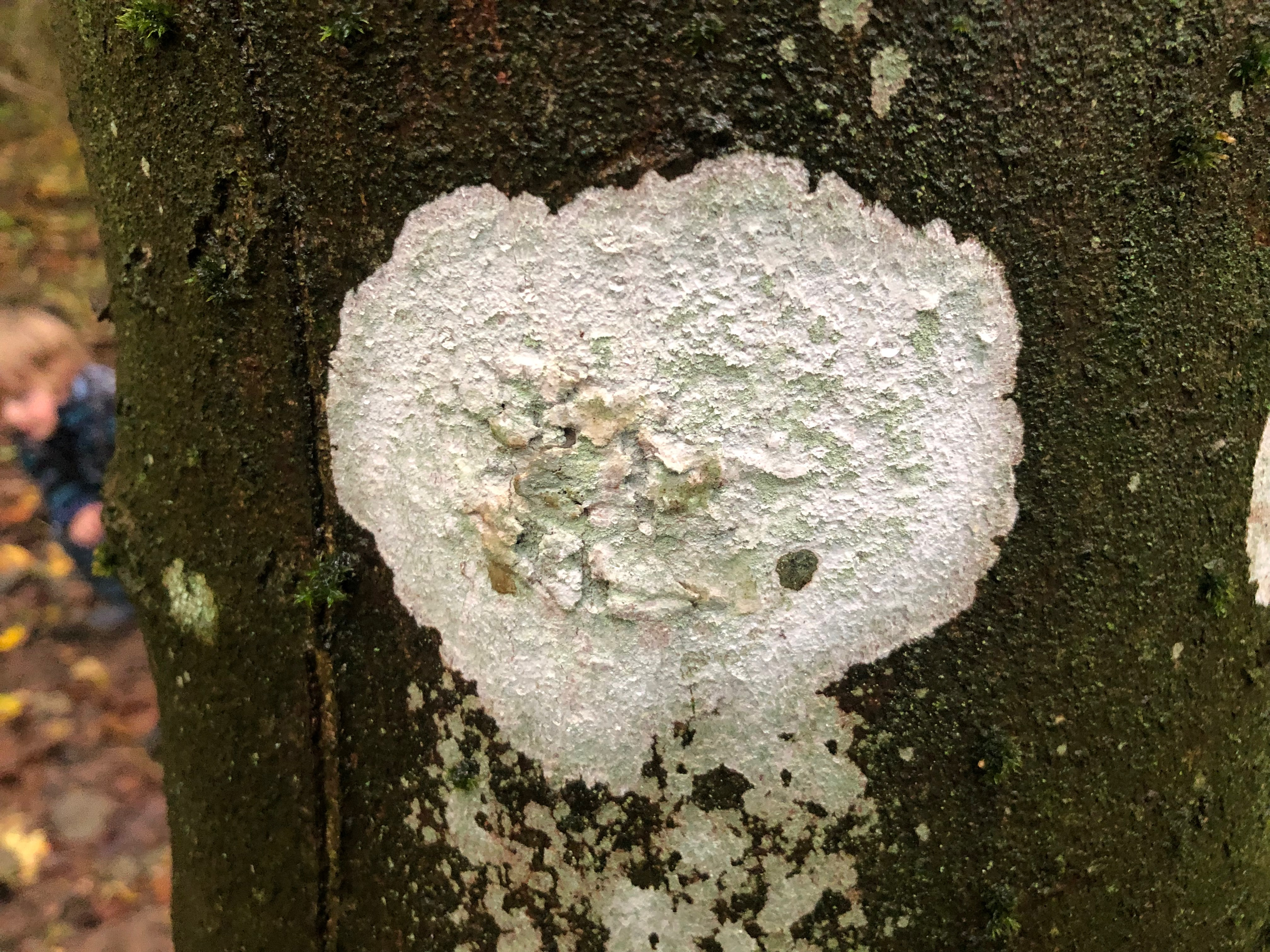
- on a tree in Denmark

Conservation status
- Apparently Secure (NatureServe)

Scientific classification
- Kingdom: Fungi
- Division: Ascomycota
- Class: Lecanoromycetes
- Order: Gyalectales
- Family: Phlyctidaceae
- Genus: Phlyctis
- Species: P. argena

Binomial name
- Phlyctis argena (Ach.) Flot. (1850)

Synonyms
- Lichen argenus Ach. (1799)

= Phlyctis argena =

Species description for a lichen

Phlyctis argena is a species of crustose lichen.

== Description ==
Phlyctis argena has a thin crustose thallus that is white, greyish or green-grey in colour. The identification can be confirmed with the spot test application a drop of potassium hydroxide (K-test) to the thallus, which will turn yellow and then red.

== Range ==
The species is widespread, including in Africa, Asia, Europe, and North America.

== Habitat ==
Phlyctis argena usually grows as a generalist epiphyte on the bark of deciduous trees, especially Salix cinerea and Fraxinus excelsior. It also occasionally grows on stone, such as gravestones.

== Ecology ==
The lichen is a generalist epiphyte of deciduous trees and is acidophilic. Its abundance appears to have increased generally since the 1970s, possibly in responses to changes in air pollution levels

== Etymology ==
The etymology of the genus name, Phlyctis, comes from the obsolete medical term phlyctidium, meaning a large blister. The species epithet, argena, is derived from the latin "argentum", meaning silver.

== Taxonomy ==
The following varieties of Phlyctis argena have been described:

- Phlyctis argena var. argena
- Phlyctis argena var. gilvoalbicans
- Phlyctis argena var. erythrosora
- Phlyctis argena var. nubilosa
