= Dalip Kumar Upreti =

Indian lichenologist

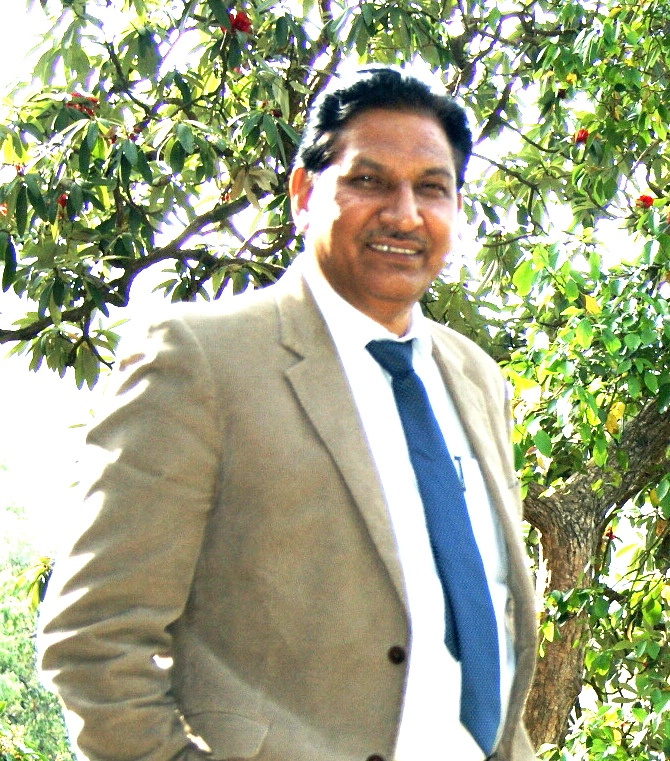

Personal details
- Born: 26 January 1958 (age 68) Pithoragarh, Uttar Pradesh State, (now in Uttarakhand State, India)

Dalip Kumar Upreti (born 26 January 1958) is an Indian lichenologist. He served as Director and Chief Scientist at CSIR-National Botanical Research Institute, Lucknow during 1988 to 2017. Also he served as Head of Lichenology and herbarium division. Presently he is serving as CSIR-Emeritus Scientist in the same division.

== Research ==
He started his career in 1978 at Lucknow University supervised by Dharani Dhar Awasthi, Father of Indian Lichenology. After earning his PhD, he worked as a Research Associate and in 1988, he joined CSIR-National Botanical Research Institute as Scientist-B and lead the Lichen Lab. He has superannuated from his service in January 2017. During this tenure, he published more than 60 research articles (including book chapters). He revised the lichen family Cladoniaceae during his doctoral degree. He has described 98 novel species. He has produced more than 35 PhD students, his students have worked in all the aspects of lichens with 400 research articles. He has revised the lichen families such as Pyrenulaceae, Graphidaceae, Teloschistaceae, Lecanoraceae, Parmeliaceae, Usneaceae, etc. Recently, Dr. Upreti received FNASc during the year 2013 for his notable service in the field of Lichenology. Pradeep Kumar Divakar is his first PhD student, who is one of the world's renowned Lichenologists. Dr.Upreti is serving as president of Indian Lichenological Society.

Dr. D. K. Upreti receives award from Mr. Prakash Javadekar Hon'ble Minister of Environment and Forests (second last) (during E.K.Janaki Ammal award ceremony)

The Janaki Ammal National Award in Plant Taxonomy for the year 2015 was given to Dr. Dalip Kumar Upreti for his work over the last three decades, leading to the establishment of more than 100 new species of lichen to the world and more than 200 species as new records to the lichen flora of India. He has also received Prof. Bashir Ahmad Razi Medal -2006) of Association for Plant Taxonomy (APT).

== Eponymy ==
Several lichen species have been named after Upreti in recognition of his contributions in the field of lichen taxonomy.

- Parmotrema upretii Divakar
- Myelochroa upretii Divakar & Elix
- Lecanora upretii Papong, Nayaka & Lumbsch
- Graphis upretii S.Joshi & Hur
- Heterodermia upretii Y.Joshi, S.Upadhyay & K.Chandra
- Coenogonium upretianum M. Cáceres and Aptroot
- Ocellularia upretii S.Joshi, Divakar, Lumbsch & Lücking

== Books coauthored/edited ==
- Mukerji, K.G., Chamola, B.P., Upreti, D.K. & Upadhyay, R.K. (eds). Biology of Lichens. Aravali Books International, New Delhi. 1999.
- D. K. Upreti; Sanjeeva Nayaka (2004). A Field Guide to the Common Lichens of Corbett Tiger Reserve. Bishen Singh Mahendra Pal Singh. ISBN 978-81-211-0334-3.
- P. K. Divakar; D. K. Upreti (2004). Parmelioid Lichens in India: A Revisionary Study. Bishen Singh Mahendra Pal Singh. ISBN 978-81-211-0389-3.
- Shukla V., Upreti D.K. and Bajpai R. Lichens to biomonitors the environment. Springer, Heidelberg New York printed at Netherlands, 2013.
- Nayaka S. and Upreti D.K. Lichens of Uttar Pradesh. Shivam press, Lucknow and Uttar Pradesh Biodiversity Board, Lucknow, 2013.
- Rai H and Upreti D.K. Terricolous lichens in India. Volume I & II. Diversity pattern and distribution ecology. Springer Verlag, 2013 ISBN 978-1-4614-8735-7.
- Bajpai R. and Upreti D. K. Lichens on Indian monuments: Biodeterioration and Biomonitoring. Bishen Singh Mahendra Pal Singh, Dehra Dun. 2014, ISBN 978-81-211-0856-0
- Upreti D.K., Divakar P.K., Shukla V. Bajpai R. Recent advances in lichenology. Vol I and II, Springer, Heidelberg New York printed at Netherlands, 2015.
- Mishra GK, Upreti DK. Lichens flora of Kumaun Himalaya. LAP Lambert Academic Publishing, Germany, pp 621, 2015

== See also ==
- Category:Taxa named by Dalip Kumar Upreti
