= Secalonic acid =

Group of chemical compounds

Secalonic acids are a group of xanthone derivatives closely related to ergoflavin and ergochrysin A that are collectively called ergochromes and belong to a class of mycotoxins initially isolated as major ergot pigments from the fungi Claviceps purpurea that grows parasitically on rye grasses. From early times and particularly in medieval Europe the consumption of grains containing ergot has repeatedly lead to mass poisonings known as ergotism which was caused by toxic ergot alkaloids and mycotoxins such as the ergochromes, due to contamination of flour by C. purpurea. A cluster of genes responsible for the synthesis of secalonic acids in C. purpurea has been identified. Secalonic acid D the enantiomer of secalonic acid A is a major environmental toxin, isolated from the fungus Penicillium oxalicum, and is a major microbial contaminant of freshly-harvested corn which causes toxicity through contamination of foodstuffs.

Major Ergot Ergochromes and Secalonic acid D

Secalonic acid A

Secalonic acid B

Secalonic acid C

Secalonic acid D

Ergoflavin

Ergochrysin A

== Occurrence ==
In addition to the occurrence in C. purpurea the secalonic acids A, B, D and ergoflavin have also been isolated from other fungi, and the three secalonic acids have also been found in various lichens. To date at least twenty-two members of the ergochrome family have been isolated and structurally identified, including secalonic acid E (the enantiomer of secalonic acid A) from the fungus Phoma terrestris, secalonic acid F from the fungus Aspergillus aculeatus, and secalonic acid G from the fungus Pyrenochaeta terrestris. In addition the monomeric units of the dimeric secalonic acids, namely hemisecalonic acids B, and E (blennolides A and E) have been isolated from Blennoria sp., an endophytic fungus from Carpobrotus edulis.

== Bioactivity ==
The secalonic family of secondary metabolite mycotoxins exhibit interesting bioactivities. Secalonic acid A has antitumor properties and also reduces colchicines toxicity in rat cortical neurons. In addition, it has been demonstrated that secalonic acid A protects against dopaminergic neuron death in a Parkinson's disease mouse model. Secalonic acid B also has antitumor activity. When tested against B16 murine melanoma it was found to be active in the low micromolar range. It also proved to be an effective antimicrobial agent against the Gram-positive bacteria (Bacillus megaterium) and the Gram-negative bacteria (Escherichia coli) and was found to be antifungal against (Microbotryum violaceum) and antialgal against (Chlorella fusca). Secalonic acid D (SAD) is a toxic and teratogenic metabolite. Teratogenic effects were observed in the development of rats that were exposed to SAD injected during fetal development. SAD exhibited potent cytotoxicity on multidrug resistance (MDR) cells and their parental cells. Investigation of the antitumor activity of SAD showed that it exerted potent cytotoxic activity on SP cells, due to induction of ABCG2 degradation by calpain-1 activation. Ergoflavin showed good anti-inflammatory activity and good anticancer activities including significant inhibition of proliferation particularly in pancreatic, renal, and lung cancer cells, and may be exerting its effects via mechanisms similar to those of secalonic acid D.

== Structure ==
Ergoflavin was first isolated in pure form from Claviceps purpurea (ergot) in 1958. It was shown to be a 2,2’- biaryl linked dimer in 1963 and the structure confirmed that year by single-crystal X-ray analysis. During the following decade the structures of secalonic acids A, B, C, D and ergochrysin A were similarly firmly established, and although there was some early contention whether they were 2,2’-, 4,4’- or even 2,4’-linked it was confirmed that they too were all 2,2’- linked between the biphenyl residues. In all known secalonic acids, the methyl and methoxycarbonyl substituents are found to be trans to each other, and X-ray analysis of the crystal structure of secalonic acid A showed that the 2,2’-biaryl linkage was nonplanar and the angle between the two biphenyl planes was 36.5°.

Isomerisation of 2,2’-, 2,4’-, and 4,4’-linked Secalonic acid A

The tetrahydroxanthone-containing secalonic acids have been demonstrated to be unstable under basic conditions, and they can easily undergo isomerizations arising from ether linkage replacement. The 2-2’linked secalonic acid A isomerizes in DMSO at room temperature to the 2-4’linked secalonic acid A and 4-4’linked secalonic acid A during 13hr, to reach an equilibrium of 3.2 : 2 : 1. This isomerisation goes faster in the presence of base (DMSO/pyridine).

== Synthesis ==
The common key feature in the synthesis of ergoflavin and the secalonic acids is the biaryl dimerisation of protected iodo-aryl monomers with Cu or Pd. Whalley's synthesis of ergoflavin 3 from hemiergoflavin 1 in 1971 was achieved by a low yield coupling of two protected 2-iodo-hemiegoflavin monomers 2 with copper under the Ullmann reaction conditions, followed by acid deprotection.

Synthesis of Ergoflavin via dimerisation 2-iodo-hemiegoflavin monomers

Similarly more than forty years later Porco's synthesis of the more labile secalonic acid D in 60% yield involved coupling two protected iodo monomers via their stannes with CuCl at room temperature, whereas Tietze achieved a similar synthesis of secalonic acid E by coupling two protected iodo monomers with Pd (OAc)_{2}under Suzuki conditions at 70 °C in 85% yield.

Synthesis of Secalonic Acid D via dimerisation of aryl stannes from 2-iodo-hemisecalonic acid D monomers

Synthesis of Secalonic Acid E via dimerisation of 2-iodo-hemisecalonic acid E monomers
