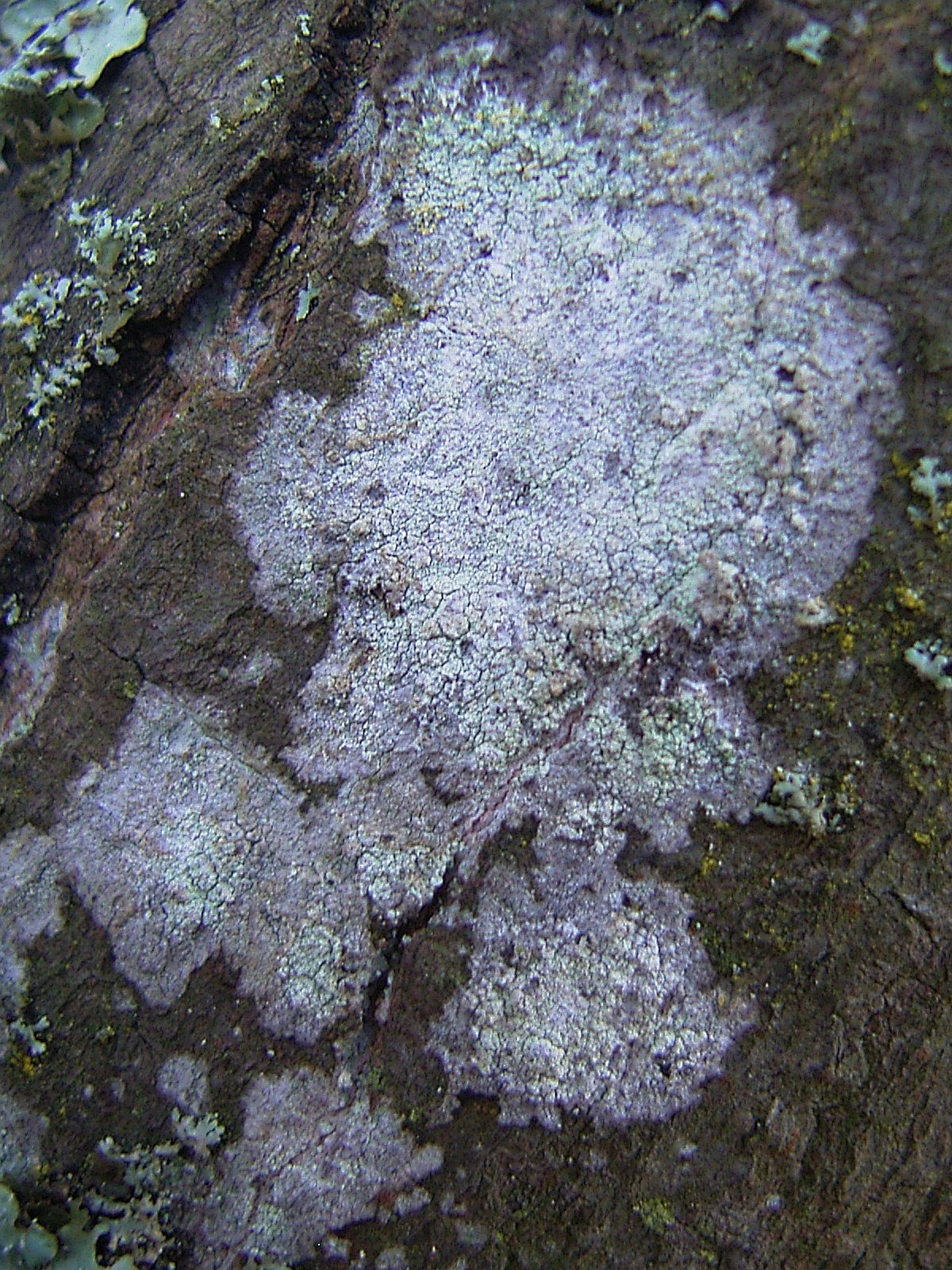
- Phlyctis argena

Scientific classification
- Kingdom: Fungi
- Division: Ascomycota
- Class: Lecanoromycetes
- Order: Gyalectales
- Family: Phlyctidaceae; Poelt ex J.C.David & D.Hawksw. (1991)

Type genus
- Phlyctis (Wallr.) Flot. (1850)

Genera
- Phlyctis; Psathyrophlyctis

Synonyms
- Phlyctidaceae Poelt (1974)

= Phlyctidaceae =

Family of fungi

The Phlyctidaceae are a family of lichenized fungi in the order Gyalectales. Species in this family have primarily a tropical distribution, and are usually found growing on bark.
