= List of lichens of Sri Lanka =

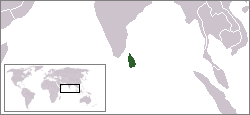
Location of Sri Lanka

Sri Lanka is a tropical island situated close to the southern tip of India. It is situated in the middle of Indian Ocean.

Lichens are a mutual relationship between algae or cyanobacteria with a fungus. Therefore it is a composite organism and not plants. Lichens can be found in different shapes and forms. They are grouped by thallus type. Thallus growth forms typically correspond to a few basic internal structure types. Common names for lichens often come from a growth form or color that is typical of a lichen genus. Coloration is usually determined by the photosynthetic component.

Sri Lanka is an island, which serves a great diversity in vegetation that includes many endemic flora and fauna. George Henry Kendrick Thwaites was the first person to collect lichens in Sri Lanka, in 1868. In 1870, W.A. Leighton examined Thwaites' collection and determined 199 species. In 1900, Almquist's collections in 1879 formed the basis of "Nylander's Lichenes Ceylonenses". In 1932, Arthur Hugh Garfit Alston listed 89 lichen species common to the Kandy district. In 1970, F. Hale collected lichens in lowland rain forests and compiled a regional monograph of Relicina and Thelotremataceae in Sri Lanka. In 1984, Brunnbauer compiled a bibliographic description of lichens in Sri Lanka in 15 fascicles included 550 species belonging to 122 genera and 48 families. During the coming years, many foreign scientists such as Moberg (1986, 1987), Awasthi (1991), Makhija and Patwardhan (1992), Breuss et al. (1997) and Vezda et al. (1997) increased the recorded number of lichens in Sri Lanka up to 659 species.

Sri Lankan lichen biota has been studied by lichenologist Gothamie Weerakoon along with many other local and foreign researchers. The systematic classification of lichen was started in 2012 by Weerakoon and discovered more than 1200 lichen species from the island. Almost half of the described lichens are represented by the family Graphidaceae. In 2003 during a lichen survey in the Kandy municipal region, about 80 lichen species belonging to 18 families and 32 genera were recorded by Nayanakantha and Gajameragedara. Of them 33 (66%) were crustose lichens, 11 (22%) foliose, 4 (8%) placodioid and the remaining 4% were fruticose and squamulose lichens.

In 2013, Weerakoon discovered 51 new varieties of Lichens endemic to Sri Lanka, where 8 of them were found from the Knuckles Mountain Range. In 2014, Weerakoon documented over 200 new lichen records from Sri Lanka, with three new species. While Udeni Jayalal et al. found 2 new lichens from Horton Plains in 2012, as Anzia mahaeliyensis and Anzia flavotenuis. In 2015, Weerakoon et al. found 6 new Graphidaceae lichens from Horton Plains. In 2016, Weerakoon and André Aptroot described 64 new records of lichens of Sri Lanka. In May 2016, Weerakoon et al. recorded8 new lichen species and 88 new records from Sri Lanka.

== Lichens of Sri Lanka ==
- Amandinea efflorescens
- Anisomeridium albisedum
- Anisomeridium anisolobum
- Anisomeridium polycarpum
- Anisomeridium subprostans
- Anisomeridium tarmugliense
- Anthracothecium duplicans
- Anzia mahaeliyensis
- Anzia flavotenuis
- Arthonia antillarum
- Arthonia calcicola
- Arthonia elegans
- Arthonia karunaratnei
- Arthonia redingeri
- Arthonia tumiduh
- Arthopyrenia cinchonae
- Arthopyrenia majuscula
- Arthopyrenia planorbis
- Arthothelium confertum
- Astrothelium cinnamomeum
- Astrothelium conjugatum
- Astrothelium galbineum
- Astrothelium nitidulum
- Bacidia medialis
- Bacidia millegrana
- Bacidiopsora psorina
- Bathelium feei
- Buellia disciformis
- Buellia morehensis
- Buellia tincta
- Bulbothrix bulbochaeta
- Bulbothrix goebelii
- Bulbothrix hypocraea
- Bulbothrix setschwanensis
- Bunodophoron macrocarpum
- Canoparmelia carneopruinata
- Chrysothrix candelaris
- Caloplaca crenularia
- Canoparmelia owariensis
- Catillaria leptocheiloides
- Cetrelia olivetorum
- Chapsa thambapanni
- Cladonia cartilaginea
- Cladonia corniculata
- Cladonia fruticulosa
- Cladonia homchantarae
- Cladonia humilis
- Cladonia kurokawae
- Cladonia mauritiana
- Cladonia mongkolsukii
- Cladonia phyllopoda
- Cladonia singhii
- Cladonia subdelicatula
- Cladonia submultiformis
- Cladonia subradiata
- Cladonia subsquamosa
- Coccocarpia palmicola
- Coccocarpia stellata
- Coenogonium isidiatum
- Coenogonium linkii
- Coenogonium nepalense
- Coenogonium roumeguerianum
- Collema actinoptychum
- Cratiria obscurior
- Cratiria rutilans
- Cresponea plurilocularis
- Cresponea proximata
- Crocynia gossypina
- Crocynia pyxinoides
- Cryptolechia caudata
- Cryptolechia plurilocularis
- Cryptothecia punctosorediata
- Dichosporidium boschianum
- Dictyonema thelephora
- Dirinaria consimilis
- Dirinaria purpurascens
- Endocarpon pallidulum
- Eschatogonia marivelensis
- Enterographa mesomela
- Enterographa tropica
- Enterographa wijesundarae
- Fellhanera stipitata
- Fissurina lumbschiana
- Fissurina tuberculifera
- Flavopunctelia flaventior
- Fuscopannaria coerulescens
- Fuscopannaria dissecta
- Graphina balbisif
- Graphina fissqfiircata
- Graphina poilaef
- Graphis anguilliformis
- Graphis mahaeliyensis
- Gyrostomum scypidiferun
- Haematomma accolens
- Haematomma flexuosum
- Hafellia curatellae
- Hafellia parastata
- Herpothallon albidum
- Herpothallon fertile
- Herpothallon granulare
- Herpothallon philippinum
- Herpothallon roseocinctum
- Heterodermia antillarum
- Heterodermia circinalis
- Heterodermia dactyliza
- Heterodermia firmula
- Heterodermia fragmentata
- Heterodermia galactophylla
- Heterodermia incana
- Heterodermia microphylla
- Heterodermia pseudospeciosa
- Heterodermia queensberryi
- Heterodermia reagens
- Heterodermia speciosa
- Heterodermia violostrata
- Hyperphyscia adglutinata
- Hypogymnia fragillima
- Hypogymnia pseudobitteriana
- Hypotrachyna awasthii
- Hypotrachyna brevirhiza
- Hypotrachyna infirma
- Hypotrachyna physcioides
- Hypotrachyna rigidula
- Hypotrachyna rockii
- Laurera meristospora
- Lecanactis minutissima
- Lecanora afrab
- Lecanora flavoviridis
- Lecanora helva
- Lecanora leprosa
- Lecanora novaehollandiae
- Lecanora subfusca
- Lecanora subimmersa
- Lecanora tropica
- Lepraria atrotomentosa
- Lepraria nigrocincta
- Lepraria sipmaniana
- Leproloma sipmanianum
- Leptogium austroamericanum
- Leptogium azureum
- Leptogium cochleatum
- Leptogium corticola
- Leptogium denticulatum
- Leptogium hibernicum
- Leptogium marginellum
- Leptogium milligranum
- Leptogium streimannii
- Leptogium trichophorum
- Letrouitia parabola
- Letrouitia sayeri
- Letrouitia transgressa
- Lithothelium obtectum
- Lobothallia alphoplaca
- Malmidea aurigera
- Malmidea badimioides
- Malmidea bakeri
- Malmidea duplomarginata
- Malmidea gyalectoides
- Malmidea hypomela
- Malmidea leptoloma
- Malmidea papillosa
- Malmidea plicata
- Malmidea sorsogona
- Malmidea subgranifera
- Malmidea vinosa
- Mazosia carnea
- Mazosia phyllosema
- Megalotremis biocellata
- Megalotremis cylindrica
- Megalotremis lateralis
- Megalotremis pustulata
- Mycomicrothelia conothelena
- Mycoporum eschweileri
- Mycoporum sparsellum
- Myeloconis fecunda
- Myriotrema compunctum
- Myriotrema glaucophaenum
- Ochrolechia africana
- Opegrapha subvulgata
- Opegrapha varia
- Opegrapha viridis
- Parmeliella brisbanensis
- Parmeliella isidiophora
- Parmeliella mariana
- Parmeliella stylophora
- Parmelinella simplicior
- Parmelinopsis minarum
- Parmelinopsis spumosa
- Parmotrema abessinicum
- Parmotrema andinum
- Parmotrema cetratum
- Parmotrema clavuliferum
- Parmotrema cooperi
- Parmotrema crinita
- Parmotrema durumae
- Parmotrema grayanum
- Parmotrema latissimum
- Parmotrema lobulascens
- Parmotrema mellissii
- Parmotrema nilgherrense
- Parmotrema poolii
- Parmotrema praesorediosum
- Parmotrema subtinctorium
- Parmotrema tinctorum
- Parmotrema uberrimum
- Parmotrema zollingeri
- Peltula euploca
- Peltula placodizans
- Peltula rodriguesii
- Pertusaria commutata
- Pertusaria lacerans
- Pertusaria nigrata
- Pertusaria pertusa
- Pertusaria porinella
- Pertusaria substerescens
- Pertusaria tropica
- Pertusaria truncata
- Phaeocalicium curtisii
- Phaeographina caesioradians
- Phaeographina coniexia
- Phlyctis brasiliensis
- Phlyctis himalayensis
- Phlyctis lueckingii
- Phlyctis monosperma
- Phyllopsora borbonica
- Phyllopsora breviuscula
- Phyllopsora confusa
- Phyllopsora corallina
- Phyllopsora dolichospora
- Phyllopsora foliata
- Phyllopsora furfuracea
- Phyllopsora kiiensis
- Physcia alba
- Physcia atrostriata
- Physcia dimidiata
- Physcia erumpens
- Physcia integrata
- Physcia poncinsii
- Physcia sorediosa
- Physcia verrucosa
- Physma byrsaeum
- Polychidium dendriscum
- Polymeridium inspersum
- Polymeridium quinqueseptatum
- Porina africana
- Porina americana
- Porina bellendenica
- Porina conspersa
- Porina corrugata
- Porina curtula
- Porina dolichophora
- Porina eminentior
- Porina innata
- Porina internigrans
- Porina mastoidella
- Porina microtriseptata
- Porina monilisidiata
- Porina nucula
- Porina nuculastrum
- Porina viridipustulata
- Pseudopyrenula subgregaria
- Pseudopyrenula subnudata
- Psoroglaena spinosa
- Pyrenula acutispora
- Pyrenula aggregataspistea
- Pyrenula anomala
- Pyrenula bahiana
- Pyrenula breutelii
- Pyrenula circumfiniens
- Pyrenula dermatodes
- Pyrenula fetivica
- Pyrenula globifera
- Pyrenula inframamillana
- Pyrenula leucotrypa
- Pyrenula massariospora
- Pyrenula micheneri
- Pyrenula microcarpa
- Pyrenula multicolorata
- Pyrenula nitidula
- Pyrenula parvinuclea
- Pyrenula quassiaecola
- Pyrenula submastophora
- Pyxine coccifera
- Pyxine consocians
- Pyxine copelandii
- Pyxine cylindrica
- Pyxine fallax
- Pyxine farinosa
- Pyxine keralensis
- Pyxine maculata
- Pyxine meissnerina
- Pyxine retirugella
- Pyxine simulans
- Pyxine subcinerea
- Ramalina conduplicans
- Ramalina farinacea
- Ramalina hossei
- Ramalina inflata
- Ramboldia haematites
- Ramboldia russula
- Relicinopsis intertexta
- Remototrachyna costaricensis
- Rimelia reticulata
- Schismatomma gemmatum
- Schistophoron muriforme
- Septotrapelia glauca
- Siphula decumbens
- Sporopodium flavescens
- Stereocaulon foliolosum
- Sticta limbata
- Sticta platyphylloides
- Stirtonia isidiata
- Tephromela atra
- Thelotrema heladiwense
- Thysanothecium scutellatum
- Topeliopsis muscigena
- Topeliopsis subtuberculifera
- Trypetheliopsis gigas
- Trypetheliopsis hirsuta
- Trypethelium eluteriae
- Trypethelium epileucodes
- Trypethelium nitidiusculum
- Trypethelium subeluteriae
- Trypethelium tropicum
- Tylophoron moderatum
- Usnea bismolliuscula
- Usnea complanata
- Usnea cornuta
- Usnea pangiana
- Usnea steineri
- Vainionora flavovirens
