= Porina muralisidiata =

Scientific classification
- Kingdom: Fungi
- Division: Ascomycota
- Class: Lecanoromycetes
- Order: Gyalectales
- Family: Porinaceae
- Genus: Porina
- Species: P. muralisidiata

Binomial name
- Porina muralisidiata Aptroot (2022)

Species of lichen-forming fungus

Porina muralisidiata is a corticolous (bark-dwelling) lichen in the family Porinaceae. It forms olive-brown patches on tree bark in lowland southern Brazil. The species is densely covered with gnarled, finger-like isidia (small outgrowths of the thallus). It also has unusually large, many-chambered (muriform) ascospores, a combination not reported in any other known Porina species. It was formally described in 2022 from material collected on roadside trees along a lakeshore at Ipanema in Porto Alegre and is known only from this locality.

== Taxonomy ==
Porina muralisidiata was described in 2022 by André Aptroot from material collected on the bark of roadside trees along a lake at Ipanema, Porto Alegre, Rio Grande do Sul, Brazil, at sea level. The holotype (M.E.S. Cáceres 22263 & A. Aptroot) is deposited in the herbarium of the Instituto de Botânica (ISE). The species was characterized as a corticolous (bark-dwelling) Porina with a thallus bearing gnarled isidia and large, muriform (multi-chambered) ascospores measuring 110–132 × 15–18 μm. No other known Porina species was reported to combine muriform ascospores with an isidiate thallus, supporting recognition of P. muralisidiata as a distinct species. The specific epithet muralisidiata refers to the muriform ascospores and the isidia.

== Description ==
The thallus of Porina muralisidiata is continuous with an irregular, slightly glossy surface. It is olivaceous brown, up to about 10 cm (4 in) across and up to 0.1 mm thick, and it is not bordered by a distinct prothallus (a marginal border of fungal tissue). The thallus is densely covered with numerous isidia, which are gnarled and about 0.1 mm wide; they may be simple or branched and often occur in clusters. The photobiont (algal partner) is trentepohlioid (Trentepohlia-type). The perithecia (flask-shaped fruiting bodies) are superficial and not covered by the thallus. They are black, globose to hemispherical with a constricted base, 0.4–0.6 mm in diameter and about 0.4 mm high; the perithecial wall is reddish inside. The ostioles (openings) are apical, single, black, and protruding, about 0.1 mm in diameter. The hamathecium (sterile tissue among the asci) is not inspersed (it lacks oil droplets). Ascospores are produced eight per ascus. They are hyaline (colorless), fusiform (spindle-shaped), and muriform (divided into many chambers), measuring 110–132 × 15–18 μm, and they lack a surrounding gelatinous sheath. Pycnidia have not been observed. In standard spot tests the thallus is UV−, C−, K−, KC− and P−. Thin-layer chromatography did not detect any distinctive secondary metabolites (lichen products).

== Habitat and distribution ==
Porina muralisidiata grows on the bark of roadside trees along a lakeshore at Ipanema in Porto Alegre, Rio Grande do Sul, Brazil, at sea level. When it was described in 2022, it had not been reported from outside Brazil. The original description also cited an additional specimen from the same locality (a paratype). No further occurrences had been reported by 2025.

== See also ==
- List of Porina species
