= Pyrenula infraleucotrypa =

Scientific classification
- Kingdom: Fungi
- Division: Ascomycota
- Class: Eurotiomycetes
- Order: Pyrenulales
- Family: Pyrenulaceae
- Genus: Pyrenula
- Species: P. infraleucotrypa

Binomial name
- Pyrenula infraleucotrypa Aptroot & M.Cáceres (2013)
- Holotype: Parque Circuito, Porto Velho, Brazil

Species of lichen-forming fungus

Pyrenula infraleucotrypa is a species of corticolous (bark-dwelling) crustose lichen in the family Pyrenulaceae. The species forms a thin glossy crust ranging from yellowish brown to olive green on tree bark and produces cone-shaped fruiting bodies that typically grow in dense groups of 3 to 40, often fusing sideways to form black crusty patches. It is widely distributed across Brazil, having been recorded from 14 states spanning the Amazon basin, northeastern coast, and central parts of the country.

== Taxonomy ==
This species was described as new by André Aptroot and Marcela Cáceres in 2013. The holotype was collected in Brazil (Rondônia, Porto Velho, Parque Circuito) on the bark of Hevea brasiliensis. In their discussion the authors noted its similarity to the Paleotropical species P. leucotrypa and distinguished it from the sympatric P. aggregataspistea.

== Description ==
This lichen develops a thin, glossy crust that ranges in color from yellowish brown to olive green and spreads widely without showing a border. It lacks pseudocyphellae. The perithecia (fruiting bodies) are superficial and conical, typically 0.4–0.7 mm in diameter, and usually occur in dense groups of three to forty. Adjacent perithecia often fuse sideways to form black, crusty patches, although each retains its own apical opening. Those openings may be black or surrounded by a whitish powdery ring. The hamathecium is clear. Each ascus contains eight ascospores arranged in two uneven rows. The spores have three cross‑walls (septa) and measure 15–18 μm long and 5–7 μm wide (exceptionally up to 22 μm long and 9 μm wide). They often have pointed ends, and their internal cavities (lumina) are angular or rounded, usually wider than long. A thick inner wall is present at the spore tips. No asexual reproductive bodies or diagnostic secondary metabolite have been reported.

== Habitat and distribution ==
Pyrenula infraleucotrypa is a bark-dwelling (corticolous) lichen that is widely distributed in Brazil, having been recorded from the following states: Acre, Amazonas, Rondônia, Amapá, Tocantins, Maranhão, Ceará, Paraíba, Pernambuco, Alagoas, Sergipe, Bahia, Mato Grosso, and Mato Grosso do Sul.

== See also ==
- List of Pyrenula species
