= List of Porina species =

This is a list of species in the fungal genus Porina, which contains lichen-forming fungi. As of August 2024, Species Fungorum (in the Catalogue of Life) accepts 161 species of Porina.

== A ==
- Porina abrupta Vězda (2004)
- Porina adflata Müll.Arg. (1883)
- Porina africana Müll.Arg. (1880)
- Porina ahlesiana (Körb.) Zahlbr. (1931)
- Porina alba (R.Sant.) Lücking (2004)
- Porina albicera (Kremp.) Overeem & D.Overeem (1922)
- Porina albida Lücking (2008)
- Porina albotomentosa Aptroot (2022) – Brazil
- Porina aluniticola P.M.McCarthy (1993)
- Porina americana Fée (1824)
- Porina aptrootii P.M.McCarthy (1993)
- Porina arnoldii Poelt & Vězda ex Hafellner & Türk (2001)
- Porina athertonii Sipman (1991)
- Porina atlantica (Erichsen) P.M.Jørg. (2000)
- Porina atriceps (Vain.) Vain. (1921)
- Porina atropunctata Lücking & Vězda (1998)
- Porina australiensis (Lücking & Vězda) Lücking (2004)
- Porina australis P.M.McCarthy & Kantvilas (2017)
- Porina austroatlantica P.M.McCarthy & Fryday (2009)
- Porina austropacifica P.M.McCarthy (2000)

== B ==
- Porina bacillifera Müll.Arg. (1882)
- Porina barbifera Lücking (2008)
- Porina bellendenica Müll.Arg. (1891)
- Porina biroi (Szatala) P.M.McCarthy (2003)
- Porina blechnicola Lücking, P.M.McCarthy & Kantvilas (2001)
- Porina boliviana Flakus & Lücking (2008)
- Porina bonplandii Müll.Arg. (1888)
- Porina bryophila P.M.McCarthy & Kantvilas (2000)

== C ==
- Porina canthicarpa P.M.McCarthy (2001)
- Porina cataractarum Aptroot & Sipman (1993)
- Porina chloroticula P.M.McCarthy (1995) – Australia
- Porina chrysophora (Stirt.) R.Sant. (1952)
- Porina coarctata P.M.McCarthy & H.Harada (2003)
- Porina collina Orange, Palice & Klepsland (2020)
- Porina conica R.Sant. (1952)
- Porina constrictospora P.M.McCarthy & Kantvilas (1993) – Australia
- Porina coralloidea P.James (1971)
- Porina corrugata Müll.Arg. (1893)
- Porina covidii Ertz & Diederich) – Mauritius
- Porina crassa P.M.McCarthy (1993)
- Porina cubana Vězda ((1984) – Cuba
- Porina cupreola (Müll.Arg.) F.Schill. (1927)

== D ==
- Porina danbullensis P.M.McCarthy & Lücking (2010) – Australia
- Porina decrescens P.M.McCarthy & Kantvilas (1993) – Australia
- Porina deminuta P.M.McCarthy (2000) – Rarotonga
- Porina distans Vězda & Vivant (1994)
- Porina distermina (Nyl.) Zahlbr. (1922)
- Porina dolichoepiphylla (2025) – Philippines
- Porina duduana Van den Broeck, Lücking & Ertz (2014) – Africa
- Porina dwesica Brusse & C.H.Dickinson (1991) – Africa

== E ==
- Porina effilata M.Brand & Sérus. (2007) – Macaronesia
- Porina elixiana P.M.McCarthy & Lücking (2010) – Australia
- Porina eminentior (Nyl.) P.M.McCarthy (2000)
- Porina epiphylla Fée (1825)
- Porina epiphylloides Vězda (1975)
- Porina exacta Malcolm, P.M.McCarthy & Kantvilas (1995)
- Porina exocha (Nyl.) P.M.McCarthy (2000)
- Porina exserta Müll.Arg. (1888)

== F ==
- Porina farinosa C.Knight (1886)
- Porina filispora Lücking (2008)
- Porina flavoaurantiaca P.M.McCarthy (2010) – Australia
- Porina flavonigra H.Harada (2015) – Japan
- Porina flavopapillata Rain.Schub. & Lücking (2003)
- Porina florensii Diederich & Ertz (2020)
- Porina fluminea P.M.McCarthy & P.N.Johnson (1995)
- Porina fortunata P.M.McCarthy & Etayo (2002)
- Porina fulvella Müll.Arg. (1883)
- Porina fulvelloides Lücking & V.Wirth (2003)
- Porina fulvula Müll.Arg. (1895)

== G ==
- Porina glaucopallida Vain. (1915) – Caribbean
- Porina grandicula (Nyl.) Zahlbr. (1922)
- Porina griffithsii Ertz & Diederich (2022) – Mauritius
- Porina gryseelsiana Van den Broeck, Lücking & Ertz (2014) – Africa
- Porina guianensis Lücking & Vězda (1998)

== H ==
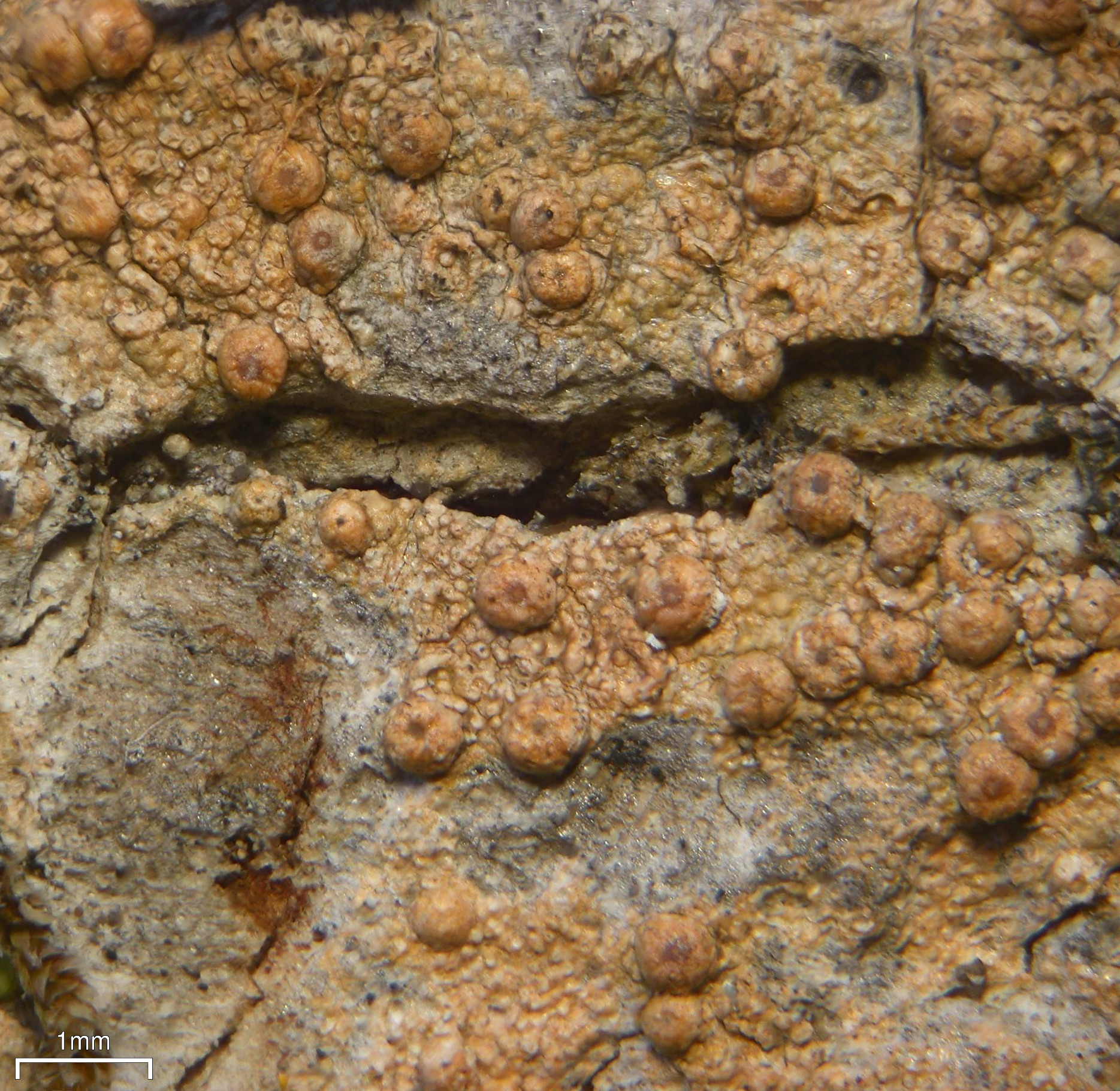
Porina heterospora

- Porina haehndelii Henssen & Lücking (2008)
- Porina heterocarpa P.M.McCarthy (1993)
- Porina heterospora (Fink) R.C.Harris (1980)
- Porina hibernica P.James & Swinscow (1962)
- Porina hirsuta Aptroot & K.H.Moon (2009)
- Porina howeana P.M.McCarthy (1997) – Australia
- Porina huainamdungensis Papong, Thammath. & Lücking (2011)
- Porina hyperleptalea P.M.McCarthy & Kantvilas (1993) – Australia

== I ==
- Porina impolita P.M.McCarthy (1994)
- Porina insueta (Nyl.) Müll.Arg. (1884)
- Porina internigrans (Nyl.) Müll.Arg. (1895)
- Porina isidiata Kalb & Hafellner (1992)
- Porina isidioambigua M.Cáceres, M.W.O.Santos & Aptroot (2013)

== K ==
- Porina kansriae P.M.McCarthy (1999)
- Porina kantvilasii P.M.McCarthy (1993)
- Porina kennedyensis P.M.McCarthy (2008)

== L ==
- Porina lectissima (Fr.) Zahlbr. (1922)
- Porina leptosperma Müll.Arg. (1883)
- Porina limbulata (Kremp.) Vain. (1921)
- Porina limitata C.Knight (1886) – Australia
- Porina linearispora Aptroot & M.Cáceres (2013) – Brazil
- Porina longispora Vězda (1975)
- Porina lucida R.Sant. (1952)

== M ==
- Porina macroverrucosa P.M.McCarthy (1993)
- Porina malmei P.M.McCarthy (1993)
- Porina mariae P.M.McCarthy (1997) – Australia
- Porina mastoidella (Nyl.) Müll.Arg. (1885)
- Porina mauritiana Ertz & Diederich) – Mauritius
- Porina maxispora Aptroot & M.Cáceres (2013) – Brazil
- Porina melanops Malme (1929) – Brazil
- Porina meridionalis P.M.McCarthy (1994)
- Porina microcoralloides Ertz, W.B.Sanders, R.Carolis, A.Ríos & Muggia (2023) – Florida, USA
- Porina microtriseptata Weerakoon & Aptroot (2016)
- Porina minutissima Henssen, Lücking & Vězda (1998)
- Porina mirabilis Lücking & Vězda (1998)
- Porina monilisidiata Weerakoon & Aptroot (2016)
- Porina morelii Aptroot & Diederich (2017) – Seychelles
- Porina multipuncta (Coppins & P.James) Ertz, Coppins & Frisch (2019)
- Porina muluensis P.M.McCarthy & Coppins (1995)
- Porina muralisidiata Aptroot (2022) – Brazil

== N ==
- Porina nadkarniae Lücking & Merwin (2008)
- Porina nanoarbuscula Ertz, W.B.Sanders, R.Carolis, A.Ríos & Muggia (2023) – Florida, USA
- Porina nigrofusca Müll.Arg. (1883)
- Porina nitens Müll.Arg. (1893)
- Porina novemseptatoides Aptroot & M.Cáceres (2013) – Brazil
- Porina nucula Ach. (1814)
- Porina nuculastrum (Müll.Arg.) R.C.Harris (1995)
- Porina nuculoides Ertz & Diederich) – Mauritius

== O ==
- Porina ocellatoides P.M.McCarthy (1997) – Australia
- Porina ochraceocarpa Sobreira, Aptroot & M.Cáceres (2016) – Brazil
- Porina ocoteae M.Brand & Sérus. (2007) – Macaronesia
- Porina orientalis P.M.McCarthy (1992)
- Porina otagensis P.M.McCarthy (1999)

== P ==
- Porina pacifica Brodo (2004)
- Porina pallescens R.Sant. (1952)
- Porina pallidocarpa H.Harada (2021) – Japan
- Porina papuensis P.M.McCarthy (1993)
- Porina partita P.M.McCarthy (1993)
- Porina pelochroa Müll.Arg. (1883)
- Porina peregrina Tretiach & P.M.McCarthy (2003)
- Porina perminuta Vain. (1924)
- Porina pilifera G.Neuwirth (2006) – Costa Rica
- Porina provincialis (Clauzade & Cl.Roux) Cl.Roux (2003)
- Porina pseudoapplanata Lücking & M.Cáceres (1999)
- Porina pseudomalmei Breuss (2002)
- Porina psilocarpa P.M.McCarthy (1993)
- Porina purpurata Sobreira, Aptroot & M.Cáceres (2016) – Brazil

== R ==
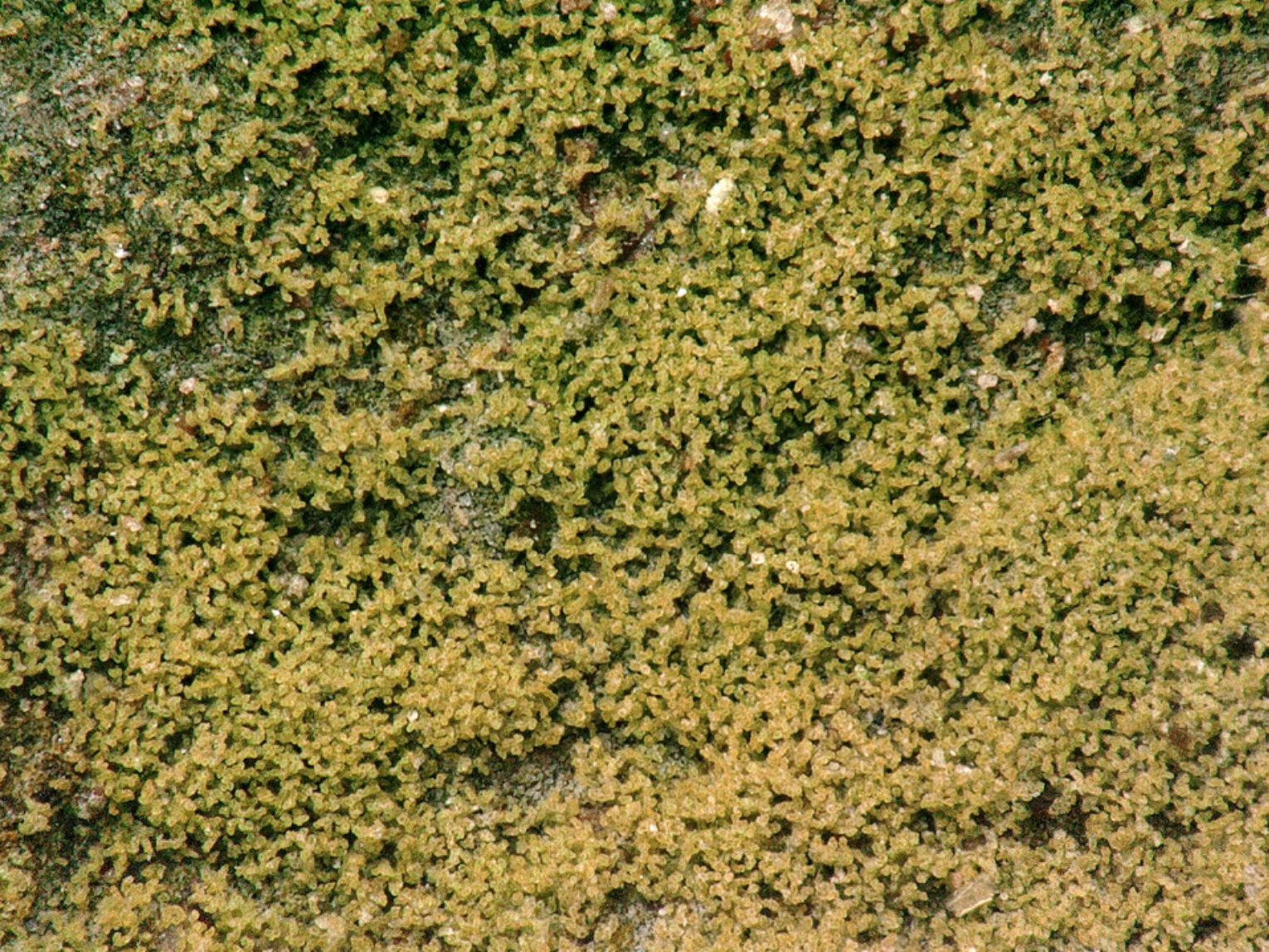
The thallus of Porina rosei, covered in isidia

- Porina radiata Kalb, Lücking & Vězda (1998)
- Porina ramiisidiata Aptroot (2023) – Brazil
- Porina rhaphidiophora (Nyl.) Müll.Arg. (1892)
- Porina rhaphispora (C.Knight) Müll.Arg. (1895)
- Porina rhodostoma Müll.Arg. (1885)
- Porina riparia P.M.McCarthy (1993)
- Porina rivalis Orange (2015)
- Porina rosei Sérus. (1991) – Europe
- Porina rudiuscula (Nyl.) Müll.Arg. (1892)
- Porina rufula (Kremp.) Vain. (1890)
- Porina rupicola Ertz & Diederich (2022) – Mauritius

== S ==
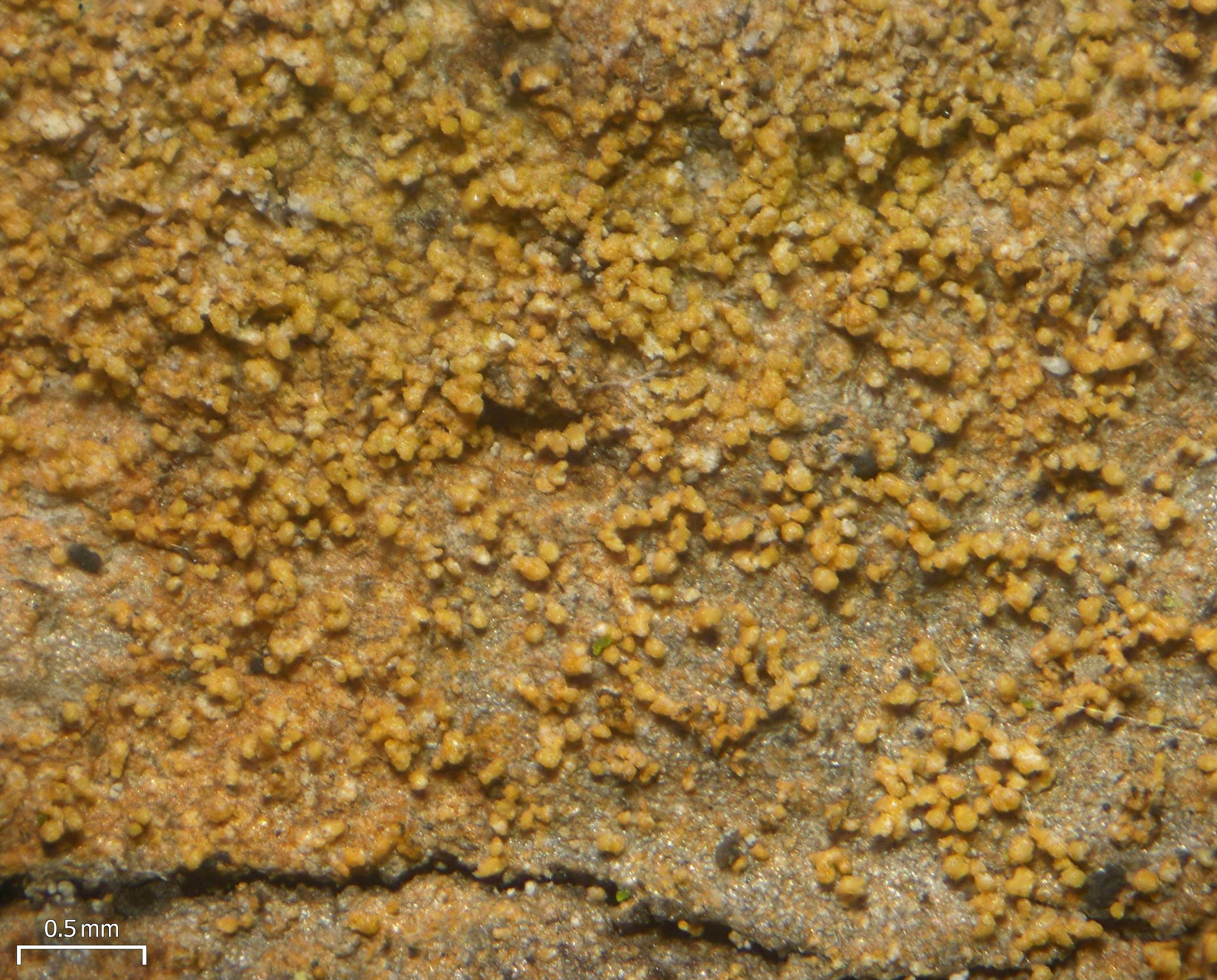
Porina scabrida

- Porina scabrida R.C.Harris (1995)
- Porina semecarpi Vain. (1921)
- Porina siamensis P.M.McCarthy (1999)
- Porina similis Kalb & Vězda (1991)
- Porina simulans Müll.Arg. (1891)
- Porina sinochlorotica Zahlbr. (1930)
- Porina sorediata Aptroot, Lücking & M.Cáceres (2019)
- Porina speciosa P.M.McCarthy & Malcolm (1996)
- Porina sphaeralis Malme (1929) – Paraguay
- Porina sphaerocephala Vain. (1921)
- Porina subapplanata Malcolm, Vězda, P.M.McCarthy & Kantvilas (1999)
- Porina subargillacea Müll.Arg. (1893)
- Porina subinterstes (Nyl.) Müll.Arg. (1889)
- Porina sublectissima (Nyl.) Zahlbr. (1922)
- Porina subnitidula Colín & A.B.Peña (2004)
- Porina subnucula Lumbsch, Lücking & Vězda (1998)
- Porina sudetica (Körb.) Lettau (1912)
- Porina sylvatica P.M.McCarthy & Kantvilas (1993) – Australia

== T ==
- Porina tahitiensis (Räsänen) P.M.McCarthy (1995)
- Porina tasmanica P.M.McCarthy (1993)
- Porina termitophila Aptroot & M.Cáceres (2013) – Brazil
- Porina terrae-reginae P.M.McCarthy, Lücking & Vězda (2001)
- Porina tetracerae (Ach.) Müll.Arg. (1885)
- Porina thujopsidicola G.Thor, Lücking & Tat.Matsumoto (2000)
- Porina tijucana Vain. (1890)
- Porina tolgensis P.M.McCarthy (2001)
- Porina tomentosa van den Boom & Sipman (2014)
- Porina tosaensis H.Harada (2015) – Japan
- Porina trichothelioides R.Sant. (1952)
- Porina triseptata (Vězda) Lücking (1998)

== U ==
- Porina ulceratula Zahlbr. (1934)
- Porina ulleungdoensis S.Y.Kondr., Lőkös, J.Halda & Hur (2018)

== V ==
- Porina vanuatuensis Lücking (2001) – Vanuatu
- Porina virescens (Kremp.) Müll.Arg. (1883)
- Porina viridipustulata Weerakoon & Aptroot (2016) – Sri Lanka

== W ==
- Porina weberi P.M.McCarthy (1993)
- Porina weghiana Van den Broeck, Lücking & Ertz (2014) – Africa
- Porina wolseleyae P.M.McCarthy (1999)

== Y ==
- Porina yambaruensis H.Harada (2008)
- Porina yoshimurae H.Harada (2015) – Japan
