= Lepraria impossibilis =

Scientific classification
- Kingdom: Fungi
- Division: Ascomycota
- Class: Lecanoromycetes
- Order: Lecanorales
- Family: Stereocaulaceae
- Genus: Lepraria
- Species: L. impossibilis

Binomial name
- Lepraria impossibilis Sipman (2004)

Species of lichen

Lepraria impossibilis is a species of leprose lichen in the family Stereocaulaceae. It forms a powdery to membranous thallus with a well-defined margin and distinctive secondary metabolites, including lecanoric acid and pannaric acid 6-methylester. The species is morphologically similar to Lepraria cupressicola and L. vouauxii but can be distinguished by its chemical composition. Lepraria impossibilis grows on tree bark, mosses, and soil-covered rocks, occurring in forested and open habitats across South and Central America, including El Salvador, Bolivia, Chile, and Peru, as well as in Iran.

== Taxonomy ==
The species was described by the Dutch lichenologist Harrie Sipman in 2004, based on specimens collected in El Salvador. The holotype was collected by Sipman, E. Sandoval, and R. Welz on 11 November 1988 in El Imposible National Park, Ahuachapán Department, El Salvador. It was found at an elevation of 1,150 m (3,770 ft) in primary forest on the north-facing slope of a ridge, growing on the trunk of a Chaperno (Lonchocarpus) tree. The specimen, designated Sipman 44851, is deposited at the herbarium of the Botanischer Garten und Botanisches Museum Berlin-Dahlem (B).

== Description ==
Lepraria impossibilis forms a powdery to membranous thallus (lichen body) with a clearly defined margin. Its colour ranges from greenish grey to grey-brown with an orange tinge. The thallus develops distinct lobes about 1 mm wide and long, with raised edges. It has a thin, white medulla (internal layer) and a grey hypothallus (attachment layer). The reproductive structures consist of abundant, medium-sized soredia measuring about 0.1 mm in diameter. Unlike some related species, it lacks projecting hyphae from the soredia. The species can be identified by its distinctive combination of secondary metabolites, including lecanoric acid and pannaric acid 6-methylester. Although morphologically indistinguishable from Lepraria cupressicola (then known as L. atrotomentosa), these species can be distinguished chemically; L. cupressicola lacks pannaric acid-6-methylester but contains zeorin and fatty acids. Another species, L. vouauxii, is similar both morphologically and chemically to L. impossibilis, but can be distinguished by the presence of lecanoric acid.

== Habitat and distribution ==
This lichen grows on tree bark, as well as on mosses found on both soil and rock surfaces. It has been recorded in forest areas and open habitats across South and Central America, including El Salvador and Costa Rica, and has also been reported from Iran. It typically occurs in both forested and open areas. In South America, where it occurs in Bolivia, Chile and Peru, it grows in high-elevation, open Andean vegetation.
