= Porina howeana =

Scientific classification
- Kingdom: Fungi
- Division: Ascomycota
- Class: Lecanoromycetes
- Order: Gyalectales
- Family: Porinaceae
- Genus: Porina
- Species: P. howeana

Binomial name
- Porina howeana P.M.McCarthy (1997)

Species of lichen

Porina howeana is a species of saxicolous (rock-dwelling) crustose lichen in the family Porinaceae. Found on Lord Howe Island, Australia, it was formally described as a new species in 1997 by lichenologist Patrick M. McCarthy. The type specimen was collected by the author from east of Dawsons Point Ridge on Max Nicholls Track, where it was growing on shaded basalt.

== Description ==
It has a olivaceous-brown, usually glossy thallus, lacking both a cortex and a prothallus. The photobiont partner is a green alga from the genus Trentepohlia, with cells that measure 6–12 by 6–10 μm. Characters that distinguish it from other members of genus Porina include its outwardly blackish involucrellum that is dark orange-brown to olive-brown on the inside, and the width of its ascospores (4–6.5 μm).

== See also ==
- List of Porina species
