= Porina rivalis =

Scientific classification
- Kingdom: Fungi
- Division: Ascomycota
- Class: Lecanoromycetes
- Order: Gyalectales
- Family: Porinaceae
- Genus: Porina
- Species: P. rivalis

Binomial name
- Porina rivalis Orange (2015)

Species of lichen

Porina rivalis is a rare species of semi-aquatic, saxicolous (rock-dwelling), and crustose lichen in the family Porinaceae. First formally described in 2015, it had previously been misidentified as Porina lectissima. The lichen features a thin, light orange-brown to grey-brown thallus and dark reproductive structures called perithecia. It specifically inhabits siliceous rocks in streams with moderate pH levels that are neither strongly acidic nor nutrient-rich, where it associates with other semi-aquatic lichens and bryophytes. Classified as "Nationally Rare" in Britain, P. rivalis is best identified by its distinctive semi-aquatic habitat preference.

== Taxonomy ==
The lichen was scientifically described as a new species in 2015 by the lichenologist Alan Orange. The type specimen was collected in Nant Walch near Llanwrtyd Wells (Breconshire) at an altitude of 230 m (750 ft); here the lichen was found growing on stones submerged in a shaded stream. The species had been known previously from streams in Wales, but it had been incorrectly identified as Porina lectissima. Porina rivalis has also been recorded from streams in South-west England and North England.

== Description ==
Porina rivalis has a thin, typically light orange-brown to grey-brown or dark grey thallus (main body). The orange tints in the thallus tend to fade when specimens are stored. The thallus measures between 20–70 μm in thickness and appears either continuous or with occasional cracks throughout its surface. A very thin brown prothallus (initial fungal growth stage) has been observed rarely. The lichen contains a trentepohlioid photobiont, referring to the type of algae that lives in symbiosis with the fungal component. Its reproductive structures, called perithecia, are prominent and measure 160–400 μm in diameter. These perithecia are typically dark brown or black, though they can sometimes appear orange-brown or brown at their base.

The involucrellum (protective outer layer of the perithecium) consists of thick-walled cells of equal dimensions that enclose numerous photobiont cells without crystals. The inner portion of the involucrellum ranges from yellow to orange and produces an orange-red reaction when tested with potassium hydroxide solution (K+). The upper surface area is dark grey to purplish red, turning dark grey or bluish grey when tested with potassium hydroxide. A small area near the ostiole (opening) often displays a dark dull violet colouration.

The centrum (inner mass of the perithecium) measures 185–295 μm in diameter, with an exciple (inner wall) that is either colourless or yellow. The ascus (spore-producing structure) is more or less cylindrical with thin walls, does not react with iodine (I−), and features a truncate apex with a ring structure. The ascospores (reproductive spores) are narrowly ellipsoid with three septa (internal divisions), measuring 13.0–17.5 μm in length and 4.0–5.5 μm in width, making them roughly 2.3–4.1 times longer than they are wide.

== Habitat and distribution ==
Porina rivalis is found on frequently inundated siliceous rocks alongside streams that are neither strongly acidified nor enriched with nutrients. Water chemistry studies conducted at two sites in Mid-Wales during 2011–2013 revealed that the species prefers in environments with pH values ranging from 5.1 to 7.2, conductivity between 32–56 μS per cm, and calcium concentrations of 1.7–4.6 milligrammes per litre.

This lichen species is typically associated with other semi-aquatic organisms, including lichens such as Dermatocarpon luridum, Ephebe lanata, Ionaspis lacustris, and various Verrucaria species, as well as bryophytes like Heterocladium heteropterum, Hygrohypnum ochraceum, and Scapania undulata.

Geographically, P. rivalis has been documented in at least 10 streams across Mid and North Wales, with additional records from single streams in South-west England and North England. The species is best identified in the field by its distinctive semi-aquatic habitat preference, which distinguishes it from related species that may occasionally tolerate submersion but are not true members of semi-aquatic lichen communities. It is classified as "Nationally Rare" in Britain, meaning it has been recorded in 15 or fewer 10 km squares.

== See also ==
- List of Porina species
