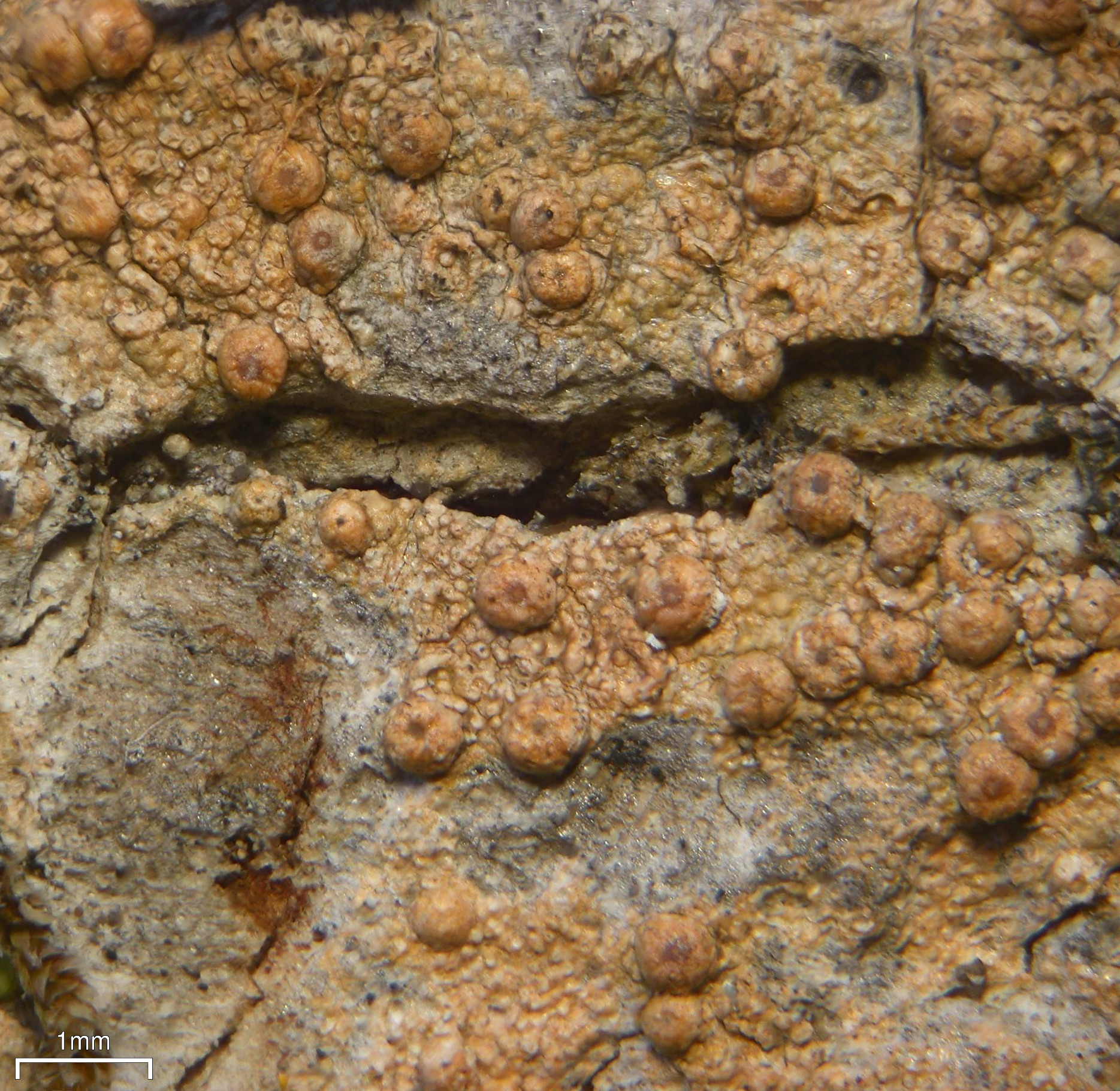

Conservation status
- Apparently Secure (NatureServe)

Scientific classification
- Domain: Eukaryota
- Kingdom: Fungi
- Division: Ascomycota
- Class: Lecanoromycetes
- Order: Gyalectales
- Family: Porinaceae
- Genus: Porina
- Species: P. heterospora

Binomial name
- Porina heterospora (Fink) R.C.Harris (1980)

Synonyms
- Porina nucula var. heterospora Fink (1933)

= Porina heterospora =

Species of lichen

Porina heterospora is a species of corticolous (bark-dwelling), crustose lichen in the family Porinaceae. It occurs in the southeastern United States.

== Taxonomy ==
The species was first described in 1933 as a variety of Porina nucula, when Joyce Hedrick published Bruce Fink's description based on a type specimen collected in Florida by William Wirt Calkins. The description was among the unpublished materials left by Fink upon his death in 1927, which Hedrick, his former student, later brought to publication. The specimen, housed in the Fink herbarium, was among the materials Fink had studied while preparing his manuscript "The Lichen Flora of the United States". Richard Harris promoted the taxon to species status in 1980.

Patrick McCarthy considered it to be a synonym of the saxicolous (rock-dwelling) species Porina guaranitica in a 1993 work, but the differences in spore structure and size between the two are significant.

== Habitat and distribution ==
Porina heterospora is common throughout the Southern Coastal Plain, having first been reported from Florida and later discovered in Louisiana and Alabama.

== See also ==
- List of Porina species
