= Porina albotomentosa =

Scientific classification
- Kingdom: Fungi
- Division: Ascomycota
- Class: Lecanoromycetes
- Order: Gyalectales
- Family: Porinaceae
- Genus: Porina
- Species: P. albotomentosa

Binomial name
- Porina albotomentosa Aptroot (2022)

Species of lichen

Porina albotomentosa is a rare species of foliicolous (leaf-dwelling) lichen in the genus Porina, described as a new species in 2022. It is identified by its hemispherical perithecia (fruiting bodies) adorned with a white tomentum, and its 3-septate, spindle-shaped ascospores. This species was first discovered on living leaves within a Cerrado forest remnant in Mato Grosso do Sul, Brazil.

== Taxonomy ==
Porina albotomentosa was formally described as a new species in 2022 by the Dutch lichenologist André Aptroot. The specific epithet albotomentosa refers to the distinctive white tomentum (short fungal hyphae with a texture similar to velvet) covering its ascomata, an unusual feature that sets it apart from other species within the genus Porina.

== Description ==
The thallus of Porina albotomentosa appears somewhat polished (nitidous) and ochraceous grey, forming patches up to 1 cm in diameter. It is quite thin, lacks a prothallus, and has trentepohlioid algae as its photobiont. The perithecia are notable for their hemispherical shape, constricted base, and nitidous, red-brown colour, measuring 0.2–0.3 mm in diameter and approximately 0.2 mm in height. These perithecia are sessile, not covered by the thallus, and are densely covered by a white tomentum. The species produces 8 ascospores per ascus, which are hyaline (translucent), 3-septate, and spindle-shaped (fusiform), measuring 12–14 by 4–5 μm.

Chemical tests on the thallus of Porina albotomentosa showed no reaction to UV light, nor to common chemical spot tests.

== Habitat and distribution ==
This lichen is solely known to occur in its type locality in Campo Grande, Mato Grosso do Sul, Brazil. It inhabits the living leaves of plants in Cerrado forests, a type of savanna-like ecosystem.

== See also ==
- List of Porina species
