= Porina mariae =

Scientific classification
- Kingdom: Fungi
- Division: Ascomycota
- Class: Lecanoromycetes
- Order: Gyalectales
- Family: Porinaceae
- Genus: Porina
- Species: P. mariae

Binomial name
- Porina mariae P.M.McCarthy (1997)

Species of lichen

Porina mariae is a species of saxicolous (rock-dwelling) crustose lichen in the family Porinaceae. Found on Lord Howe Island, Australia, it was formally described as a new species in 1997 by lichenologist Patrick M. McCarthy. The type specimen was collected by the author on the track from Smoking Tree Ridge to Boat Harbour, where it was growing on deeply shaded basalt. The species epithet honours the author's wife, Marie Meaney-McCarthy, "in recognition of her unwavering encouragement and support".

== Description ==
The lichen has a pale grey-green, matt to slightly glossy thallus, lacking both a cortex and a prothallus. The photobiont partner is a green alga from the genus Trentepohlia, with cells that measure 8–20 by 7–16 μm. Characters that distinguish it from other members of genus Porina include the thickness of its involucrellum (80–200 μm), and the dimensions of its perithecia (0.48–0.97 mm in diameter, convex to hemispherical in shape and lacking attenuation at the base).

== See also ==
- List of Porina species
