= Anzia flavotenuis =

Scientific classification
- Kingdom: Fungi
- Division: Ascomycota
- Class: Lecanoromycetes
- Order: Lecanorales
- Family: Parmeliaceae
- Genus: Anzia
- Species: A. flavotenuis

Binomial name
- Anzia flavotenuis Jayalal, Wolseley & Aptroot (2012)

Species of lichen

Anzia flavotenuis is a species of lichen-forming fungus of the large family Parmeliaceae. It was described in 2012 by lichenologists studying lichens in Sri Lanka's Horton Plains National Park and was named for its distinctive yellow-tinged inner tissue and comparatively slender lobes. The lichen forms loose, grey to bluish-grey rosettes on tree bark, with narrow branching lobes that bear small cylindrical structures with dark tips for reproduction. It is endemic to the cloud forests of Sri Lanka's Central Highlands, where it grows as an epiphyte on smooth-barked trees at elevations of 2,050–2,100 metres in cool, misty conditions.

== Taxonomy ==
Anzia flavotenuis is a foliose member of the family Parmeliaceae that was formally described in 2012 by Udeni Jayalal, Pat Wolseley and André Aptroot. The holotype was gathered in March 2007 on the trunk of Neolitsea fuscata at about 2050 m elevation on the Horton Plains plateau, central Sri Lanka. The authors coined the specific epithet to reflect the species' distinctive yellow-tinged medulla (flavo) and comparatively slender lobes (tenuis).

Molecular analyses of the internal transcribed spacer region place A. flavotenuis in a strongly supported clade with A. hypoleucoides, although the two differ morphologically and chemically; A. flavotenuis alone has isidia with dark tips and a bicoloured medulla. Together with the related Sri-Lankan species A. mahaeliyensis, it represents one of two newly recognised lineages that challenge the current subgeneric classification of Anzia, which is based on the presence or absence of a chondroid axis.

== Description ==
The thallus forms loose, grey-to-bluish-grey rosettes 1–3 cm across that are only lightly attached to the bark. Lobes are convex, entire and more or less linear (about 0.8–1 mm wide), branching dichotomously with short internodes; with age they can turn brownish. Minute cylindrical isidia arise mainly on the upper surface; they are initially pale but develop conspicuous brown-black tips.

Internally, the cortex overlies a two-layered medulla: an upper yellow zone and a lower white zone. Running through the medulla is a dense chondroid axis of parallel hyphae that acts rather like a central rope, providing mechanical strength—a feature shared by only some Anzia species. Beneath, the lower surface is patchily covered by a dark, sponge-like network of hyphae (the spongiostratum) punctuated by stout black rhizines that anchor the thallus to the substrate. No apothecia (fruiting bodies) have been observed, so sexual reproduction has not yet been documented in A. flavotenuis. Chemical spot tests show atranorin in the cortex (K+ yellow) and lobaric acid in the medulla (K+ yellow; KC+ yellow-orange); thin-layer chromatography also detects an unidentified yellow pigment.

== Habitat and distribution ==
The species is endemic to the Horton Plains National Park, an isolated montane cloud forest plateau in the Central Highlands of Sri Lanka at 2050–2100 m elevation. It grows as an epiphyte on the smooth bark of live Neolitsea trees and occasionally on dead trunks within small forest 'islands' scattered among the grasslands. Horton Plains experiences cool, humid conditions, heavy mist and high rainfall, creating a microclimate that favours corticolous (bark-dwelling) lichens.
