= Porina boliviana =

Scientific classification
- Kingdom: Fungi
- Division: Ascomycota
- Class: Lecanoromycetes
- Order: Gyalectales
- Family: Porinaceae
- Genus: Porina
- Species: P. boliviana

Binomial name
- Porina boliviana Flakus & Lücking (2008)
- Holotype: Nuevos Reyes village, Bolivia

Species of lichen

Porina boliviana is a species of foliicolous (leaf-dwelling) crustose lichen in the family Porinaceae. It was formally described as a new species in 2008 by the lichenologists Adam Flakus and Robert Lücking. They named it after the country where it was discovered, Bolivia. Flakus collected the type specimen from Nuevos Reyes village in the José Ballivián Province (Beni Department), where he found it growing on palm tree leaves in a lowland Amazon forest.

== Description ==
Porina boliviana forms a thin, green layer (a thallus) on the surface of leaves. This layer starts as small, round patches about 0.5–1 mm in diameter, which can eventually merge to cover areas up to 10 mm across. The surface of the thallus is smooth and shiny, without any visible crystals or borders. The lichen's algal partner, Phycopeltis, forms a continuous layer within the thallus. The algal cells are elongated (15–23 by 3–6 μm) and arranged in a flat, radiating pattern that branches out like a fan.

The fungal partner (mycobiont) produces small, reproductive structures called perithecia. These are lens-shaped to hemispherical, sometimes almost cone-like, and measure 0.15–0.2 mm in diameter. They are orange-yellow in colour and often have fine, white hairs, especially near the top. Inside the perithecia are the asci, which produce the lichen's spores. Each ascus contains eight spores, which are elongated with rounded ends and have 3 cross-walls (septa). The spores measure 17–22 by 3–4 μm.

== Habitat and distribution ==
At the time of its initial description, Porina boliviana had only been found in one location: near the village of Nuevos Reyes in the Beni Department of Bolivia. This area is part of the lowland southwest Amazon rainforest, at an elevation of about 190 m (620 ft) above sea level. It has since been recorded at a similar elevation from the Parque Ecologico Cobija in the Nicolás Suárez Province (Pando Department).

== See also ==
- List of Porina species
