= Porina huainamdungensis =

Scientific classification
- Kingdom: Fungi
- Division: Ascomycota
- Class: Lecanoromycetes
- Order: Gyalectales
- Family: Porinaceae
- Genus: Porina
- Species: P. huainamdungensis

Binomial name
- Porina huainamdungensis Papong, Thammathaworn & Lücking (2011)

Species of fungus

Porina huainamdungensis is a species of lichen in the family Porinaceae. Known from Thailand, where it grows in lower-elevation montane rainforests, it was described as new to science in 2011. The specific epithet refers to the type locality, Huai Nam Dang National Park in Chiang Mai Province. The lichen lives on the surface of living leaves in the understory of montane rainforests, forming extremely thin, shiny greenish-grey patches with distinctive pale yellow-orange fruiting bodies. It has been found at elevations of 1,400–1,500 metres in protected areas of northern and northeastern Thailand, where it grows on the glossy leaves of shrubs and young trees in consistently humid, shaded conditions.

== Taxonomy ==
Porina huainamdungensis was introduced to science by Narongrit Papong, Achra Thammathaworn, and Robert Lücking from collections made in 2006 in Huai Nam Dang National Park, northern Thailand. The authors placed it in Porina because its thin, glossy thallus, Phycopeltis green algal photobiont, and lens-shaped perithecia (fruiting bodies) conform to the diagnostic features of that microfilamentous, mainly tropical genus. Within Porina the new taxon sits close to P. cupreola, sharing small, flattened perithecia and seven-septate spores; it is set apart, however, by the much paler yellow-orange colour of its fruiting bodies and by slightly shorter spores. Superficially similar species such as P. fulvelloides and P. subapplanata differ in spore septation or in having larger reproductive structures, confirming the distinctness of the Thai material.

== Description ==
The lichen lives on the surface of living leaves (epiphyllous) where it forms scattered, rounded patches that may merge into irregular masses. These crusts are a shiny greenish-grey and extremely thin, only about 15–20 micrometres (μm) deep, with no darker border visible at the edges. The algal partner belongs to Phycopeltis and appears as rectangular cells arranged in neat, radiating rows beneath the fungal layer. Reproductive structures are abundant: each perithecium is lens-shaped with a broadly spreading base, 0.2–0.3 mm across, and a distinctive pale yellow-orange wall. A light-yellow involucrellum overlies the colourless excipulum, both turning shades of orange or yellow when treated with potassium hydroxide solution. Inside, unbranched paraphyses line a flask-shaped cavity that contains a single layer of eight ascospores in each ascus. The asci are spindle-shaped, 65–75 × 8–10 μm, and show no iodine reaction in the apex. Spores are colourless, narrowly spindle-shaped (fusiform), divided by seven cross-walls, and measure 24–28 × 3–4 μm.

== Habitat and distribution ==
Porina huainamdungensis has been recorded several times in lower montane rainforest in northern and north-eastern Thailand, at around 1,400–1,500 m elevation. It is an understory species, colonising the glossy leaves of shrubs and young trees where consistently high humidity and subdued light prevail. All known collections come from protected areas—Huai Nam Dung and Phu Kradueng national parks. Porina huainamdungensis is one of about 40 species of Porina that have been documented from Thailand.

== See also ==
- List of Porina species
