= Porina weghiana =

Scientific classification
- Domain: Eukaryota
- Kingdom: Fungi
- Division: Ascomycota
- Class: Lecanoromycetes
- Order: Gyalectales
- Family: Porinaceae
- Genus: Porina
- Species: P. weghiana

Binomial name
- Porina weghiana Van den Broeck, Lücking & Ertz (2014)

Species of lichen

Porina weghiana is a rare species of foliicolous (leaf-dwelling) lichen in the family Porinaceae. Found in the Democratic Republic of the Congo, it was formally described as new to science in 2014 by Dries Van den Broeck, Robert Lücking, and Damien Ertz. The type specimen was collected in the valley of Loika (a tributary of the Itimbiri River, Province of Équateur) at an altitude of 350 m (1,150 ft), where it was found growing on palm tree leaves along the river. It is only known to occur in the type locality. It resembles Porina ornata in appearance but differs in having disc-shaped isidia, yellow perithecia lacking apical appendages, and ascospores that are smaller and have fewer septa. The species epithet is named after the first author's girlfriend, Micheline Wegh.

== See also ==
- List of Porina species
