= Porina gryseelsiana =

Scientific classification
- Domain: Eukaryota
- Kingdom: Fungi
- Division: Ascomycota
- Class: Lecanoromycetes
- Order: Gyalectales
- Family: Porinaceae
- Genus: Porina
- Species: P. gryseelsiana

Binomial name
- Porina gryseelsiana Van den Broeck, Lücking & Ertz (2014)

Species of lichen

Porina gryseelsiana is a species of foliicolous lichen belonging to the family Porinaceae. It was discovered in Orientale Province, in the Democratic Republic of the Congo on the leaves of understorey plants in a tropical rainforest. It was subsequently described as new to science in 2014. It is a rare species which is only known from this one collection.

It resembles Porina octomera in appearance but can be differed from it by its orange-brown perithecia and larger spores. The photobiont of this species is the green alga Phycopeltis.

== See also ==
- List of Porina species
