= Porina linearispora =

Scientific classification
- Domain: Eukaryota
- Kingdom: Fungi
- Division: Ascomycota
- Class: Lecanoromycetes
- Order: Gyalectales
- Family: Porinaceae
- Genus: Porina
- Species: P. linearispora

Binomial name
- Porina linearispora Aptroot & M.Cáceres (2013)

Species of lichen

Porina linearispora is a species of corticolous (bark-dwelling) lichen in the family Porinaceae. Found in Brazil, it was formally described as a new species in 2013 by lichenologists André Aptroot and Marcela Cáceres. The type specimen was collected by the authors from the Parque Natural Municipal de Porto Velho (Porto Velho, Rondônia), where it was found growing on bark in a primary rainforest. The lichen is distinguished from other members of genus Porina by its long and thin ascospores, for which the species is named.

== Description ==
The corticate thallus of Porina linearispora is smooth, shiny, and thin, with a green color and no visible warts. A continuous black hypothallus is present below, surrounded by a shiny white prothallus line. The algae are trentepohlioid. The lichen has perithecioid ascomata that are simple, dispersed, hemispherical, and emergent, with a diameter ranging from 0.2 to 0.3 mm. The colour of the ascomata is brown, and they are fully immersed in thallus warts of 0.3–0.4 mm in diameter. The wall of the ascomata is brown, and KOH negative. The ostioles are pale brown and apical. The hamathecium is not inspersed. The ascospores are hyaline, filiform with rounded ends, and measure 75–90 by 1.5–2.0 μm; they typically have 9 septa (internal partitions), although that number ranges between 7 and 13. There is no surrounding gelatinous layer around the ascospores.

== See also ==
- List of Porina species
