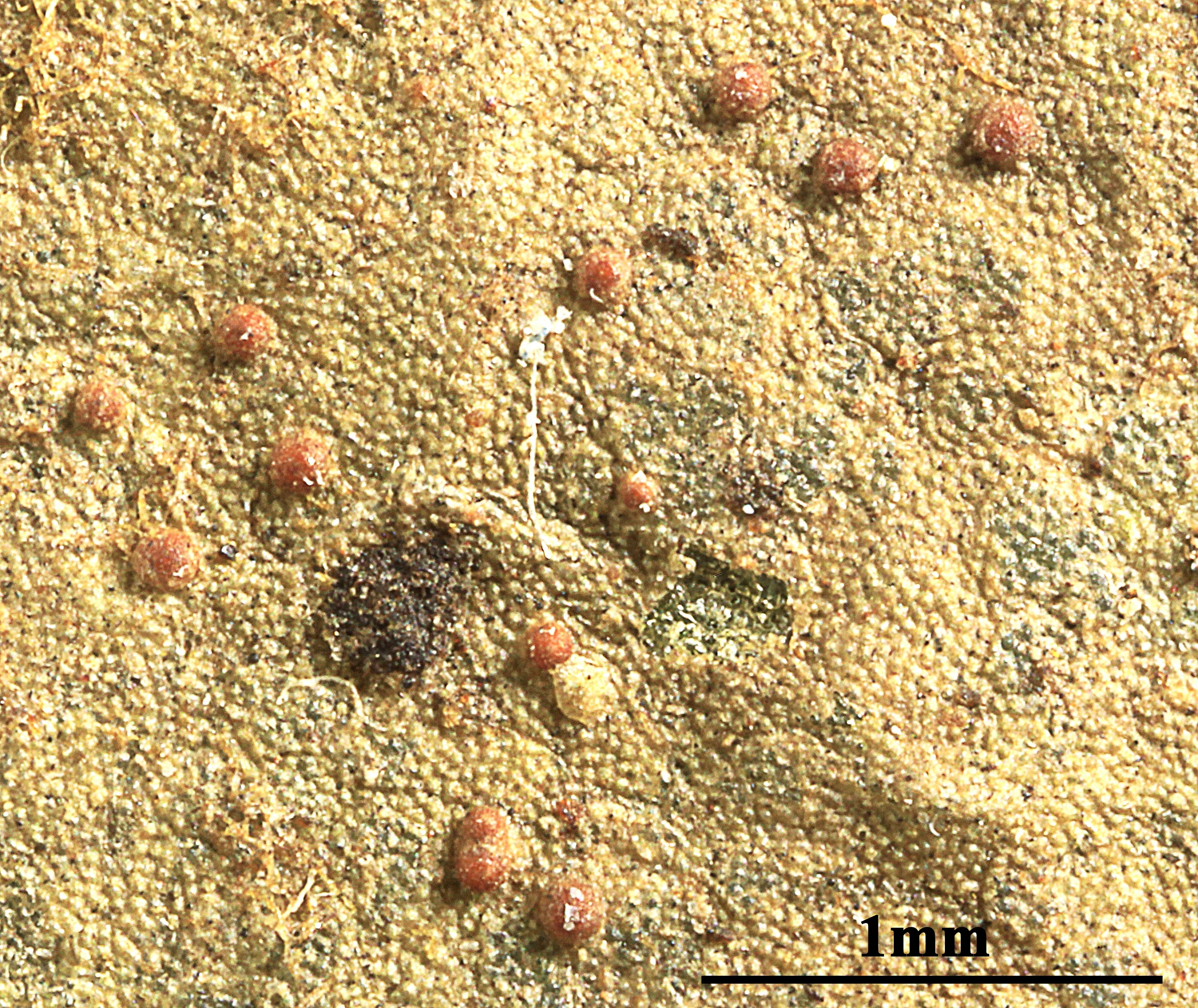

Scientific classification
- Domain: Eukaryota
- Kingdom: Fungi
- Division: Ascomycota
- Class: Lecanoromycetes
- Order: Gyalectales
- Family: Porinaceae
- Genus: Porina
- Species: P. leptosperma

Binomial name
- Porina leptosperma Müll.Arg. (1883)

Synonyms
- Phylloporina leptosperma (Müll.Arg.) Müll.Arg. (1890)

= Porina leptosperma =

Species of lichen

Porina leptosperma is a species of foliicolous (leaf-dwelling) crustose lichen in the family Porinaceae. It was described as a new species in 1883 by Johannes Müller Argoviensis. Originally described from specimens collected in Brazil, it is also found in the Usambara Mountains of Tanzania, New Zealand and Tasmania.

== See also ==
- List of Porina species
