= Porina ocellatoides =

Scientific classification
- Kingdom: Fungi
- Division: Ascomycota
- Class: Lecanoromycetes
- Order: Gyalectales
- Family: Porinaceae
- Genus: Porina
- Species: P. ocellatoides

Binomial name
- Porina ocellatoides P.M.McCarthy (1997)

Species of lichen

Porina ocellatoides is a species of saxicolous, (rock-dwelling) crustose lichen in the family Porinaceae. Found on Lord Howe Island, Australia, it was formally described as a new species in 1997 by lichenologist Patrick M. McCarthy. The type specimen was collected by the author on the track from Smoking Tree Ridge to Boat Harbour, where it was found growing on deeply shaded basalt. Its species epithet ocellatoides alludes to its resemblance to Porina ocellata.

== Description ==
The lichen has a pale grey-green to pale brown, matt to glossy thallus. It has a prothallus that is either thin and black or not apparent. The photobiont partner of Porina ocellatoides is a green alga from the genus Trentepohlia, with cells that measure 6–12 by 6–10 μm. Characters that distinguish it from other members of genus Porina include its fully muriform ascospores, and the dimensions of its perithecial verrucae (0.65–1 mm in diameter), involucrellum (0.2–0.65 mm in diameter), and its centrum (0.3–0.42 mm in diameter).

== See also ==
- List of Porina species
