= Porina duduana =

Scientific classification
- Domain: Eukaryota
- Kingdom: Fungi
- Division: Ascomycota
- Class: Lecanoromycetes
- Order: Gyalectales
- Family: Porinaceae
- Genus: Porina
- Species: P. duduana

Binomial name
- Porina duduana Van den Broeck, Lücking & Ertz (2014)

Species of lichen

Porina duduana is a species of foliicolous lichen belonging to the family Porinaceae. It was discovered in Yangambi, in the Democratic Republic of the Congo on the leaves of Scaphopetalum thonneri and subsequently described as new to science in 2014. It resembles Porina rufula in appearance but differs in the arrangement of photobiont cells and in having smaller perithecia and smaller ascospores.

== See also ==
- List of Porina species
