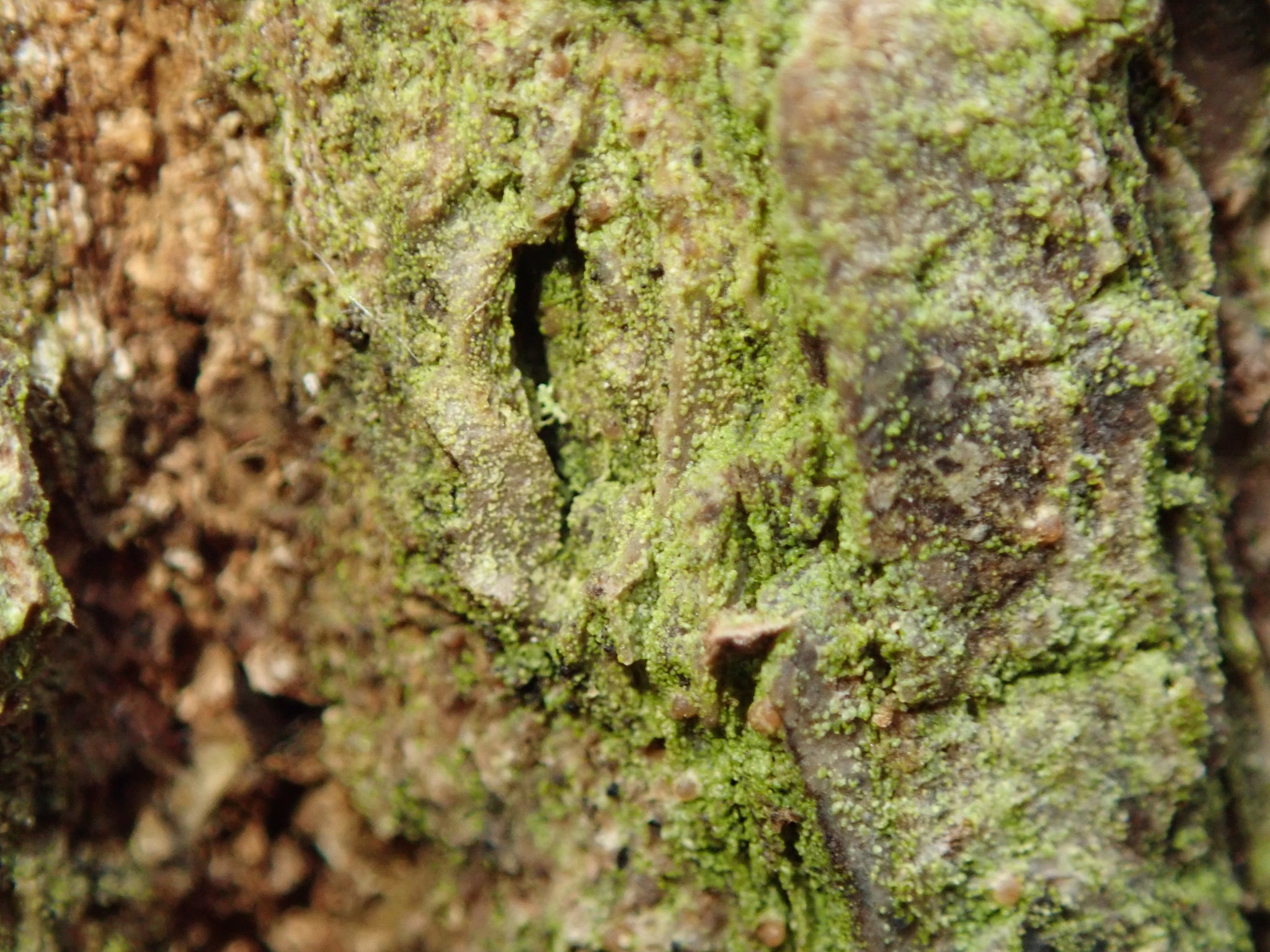

Scientific classification
- Domain: Eukaryota
- Kingdom: Fungi
- Division: Ascomycota
- Class: Eurotiomycetes
- Order: Verrucariales
- Family: Verrucariaceae
- Genus: Psoroglaena
- Species: P. dictyospora

Binomial name
- Psoroglaena dictyospora (Orange) H.Harada, 2003

Synonyms
- Macentina dictyospora Orange; Leucocarpia dictyospora (Orange) R.Sant.

= Psoroglaena dictyospora =

Species of fungus

Psoroglaena dictyospora is a species of fungus belonging to the family Verrucariaceae.

It is native to Europe and North America.
