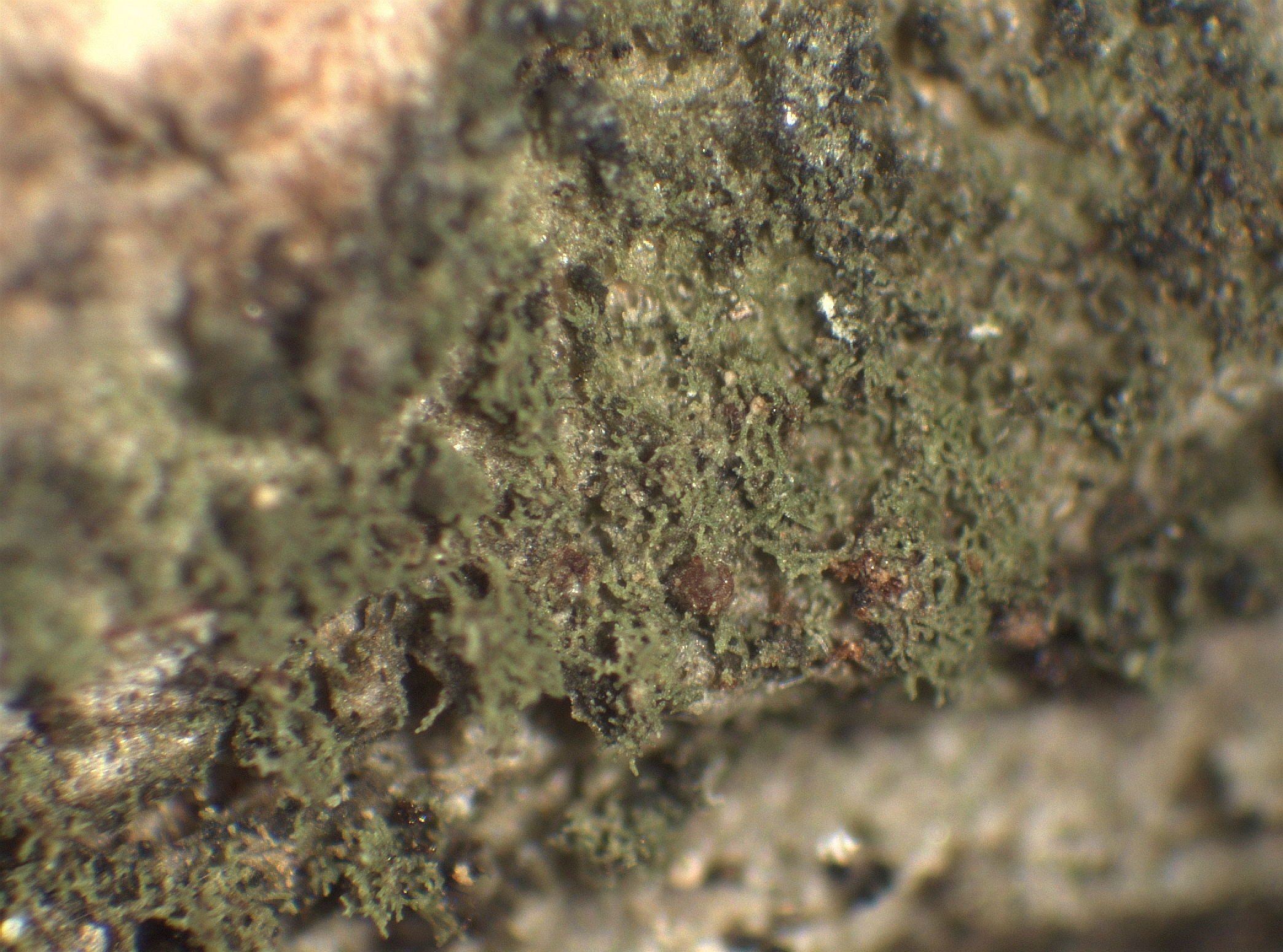

Scientific classification
- Kingdom: Fungi
- Division: Ascomycota
- Class: Eurotiomycetes
- Order: Verrucariales
- Family: Verrucariaceae
- Genus: Psoroglaena
- Species: P. stigonemoides

Binomial name
- Psoroglaena stigonemoides (Orange) Henssen (1995)

Synonyms
- Leucocarpia stigonemoides (Orange) Hafellner & Kalb (1992); Macentina stigonemoides Orange (1989)

= Psoroglaena stigonemoides =

Species of lichen

Psoroglaena stigonemoides is a species of corticolous (bark-dwelling) lichen in the family Verrucariaceae. It grows primarily on tree bark in humid environments throughout Great Britain, Ireland and parts of Europe. First scientifically described in 1989, it forms distinctive thread-like structures that often break into granular fragments less than a millimetre in height. The species shows a preference for elder trees but can also be found on sycamore, oak, willow and elm, typically in sheltered woodland locations with high humidity. It has a unique biological structure where its fungal component arranges unicellular green algae into rows that resemble filamentous colonies. Unlike many related lichens, it produces pale brown reproductive structures rather than darkly pigmented ones, and is frequently found without these structures. Though widespread across the British Isles, it is often overlooked due to its small size and resemblance to algae or moss protonemata.

== Taxonomy ==
The lichen was first described scientifically by the lichenologist Alan Orange in 1989, as Macentina stigonemoides. He collected the type specimen from Cardiganshire, Cambria, where it was found growing on the bark of Ulmus glabra in a humid forest. Aino Henssen reclassified it in the genus Psoroglaena in 1995.

== Description ==
Psoroglaena stigonemoides has several distinctive characteristics. The thallus (main body) is pale green and filamentous (thread-like), forming a densely branched structure reaching 50–600 micrometres (μm) in height. Under magnification, the branches appear cylindrical with a width of 12–35 μm. The surface cells of the thallus have distinctive conical papillae (small bumps or protrusions), which is an important identifying feature.

A distinctive characteristic of P. stigonemoides is that its filamentous branches often break apart into granular fragments, creating paler green areas on the thallus. In some specimens, especially smaller sterile ones, the lichen may appear almost entirely granular rather than filamentous.

The reproductive structures (perithecia) are pale brown when dry and ovoid to pear-shaped, measuring 200–340 μm wide and 230–420 μm high. When wet, they can expand to 380 μm wide and 480 μm high. The perithecia lack the dark pigmentation typically found in other members of the family Verrucariaceae. The spores produced are colourless, fusiform-ellipsoid (spindle to oval shaped), with 3–5 cross-walls (septa), and measure roughly 16–21 by 5–6 μm.

== Photobiont ==
The photobiont of Psoroglaena stigonemoides, initially thought to be a cyanobacterium, was later identified as a unicellular green alga belonging to the class Trebouxiophyceae. Molecular and ultrastructural studies by Nyati and colleagues (2007) revealed that the photobiont is closely related to Auxenochlorella protothecoides, a non-symbiotic green alga, and to a Chlorella endosymbiont found in the freshwater polyp Hydra viridis. This represents the first discovery of this lineage of green algae as a photobiont in lichen-forming fungi. Transmission electron microscopy showed that these unicellular algal cells contain one parietal chloroplast per cell with a weakly visible pyrenoid. Unlike other microfilamentous lichens that derive their shape from filamentous photobionts, P. stigonemoides has a unique arrangement where the fungal partner positions the unicellular algal cells in multiseriate rows, creating a structure that strongly resembles filamentous cyanobacterial colonies.

== Habitat and distribution ==
Psoroglaena stigonemoides occupies a specific ecological niche, primarily growing on bark with higher moisture retention capabilities and relatively elevated pH levels. While it shows a strong preference for elder (Sambucus nigra), the species has also been documented on several other tree species including sycamore (Acer pseudoplatanus), oak (Quercus sp.), white and crack willow (Salix alba and Salix × fragilis), and wych elm (Ulmus glabra). The lichen often establishes itself within the crevices and fissures of bark, though not necessarily in areas that are completely sheltered from rainfall. In Wales, P. stigonemoides is predominantly found in locations characterized by higher humidity and shelter, frequently in shaded environments. These habitats include deciduous woodlands, conifer plantations, and protected field boundaries, although it is known to also colonise more exposed settings such as hedgerows and urban park environments.

Psoroglaena stigonemoides typically grows in species-poor communities or in areas dominated by bryophytes (mosses and liverworts). It frequently occurs with few accompanying lichen species, though it has been observed growing alongside Anisomeridium nyssaegenum with some regularity. In many instances, this lichen grows in near isolation, with only Trentepohlia algae and other free-living algae as companions.

By 1989, the species had been documented across numerous vice-counties throughout Great Britain and Ireland, suggesting a widespread distribution. Fertile specimens were collected from Wales, Perthshire, West Sussex, and Sligo, though the lichen is frequently found in a sterile state without reproductive structures. Given its extensive presence in the British Isles, researchers suggested it might also occur in neighbouring European regions, which was later confirmed with collections from central and northern France in 1989. It has also been recorded in Spain.
