= Anzia mahaeliyensis =

Scientific classification
- Kingdom: Fungi
- Division: Ascomycota
- Class: Lecanoromycetes
- Order: Lecanorales
- Family: Parmeliaceae
- Genus: Anzia
- Species: A. mahaeliyensis

Binomial name
- Anzia mahaeliyensis Jayalal, Wolseley & Aptroot (2012)

Species of lichen-forming fungus

Anzia mahaeliyensis is a species of foliose lichen in the large family Parmeliaceae. It was discovered by scientists studying lichens in Sri Lanka's Horton Plains National Park and was named after the local Sinhalese name Maha Eliya for this high-elevation plateau. The lichen forms loose grey to bluish-grey rosettes on tree bark, with narrow forked lobes that bear abundant small cylindrical structures for asexual reproduction across their upper surfaces. It is endemic to the cloud forests of Sri Lanka's Central Highlands at elevations of 2,150–2,175 meters, where it grows on both living and dead montane forest trees in persistently misty, cool conditions.

== Taxonomy ==
Anzia mahaeliyensis is a foliose lichen in the family Parmeliaceae that was formally described in 2012 by Udeni Jayalal, Pat Wolseley and André Aptroot. The holotype was collected in March 2007 from the trunk of a dead tree at roughly 2150 m on the Horton Plains plateau (historically called Maha Eliya) in Sri Lanka. The specific epithet commemorates the local Sinhal name for this high-elevation grassland-forest mosaic.

Molecular analysis of the nuclear internal transcribed spacer region shows that A. mahaeliyensis forms a well-supported clade with A. flavotenuis and their relative A. hypoleucoides; it is the immediate sister to the A. flavotenuis + A. hypoleucoides pair. In morphological terms the species lacks the chondroid axis (a central 'cord' of reinforcing hyphae) that characterises some other Anzia lineages, highlighting incongruence between traditional subgeneric groupings and genetic relationships.

== Description ==
The thallus forms loose grey to bluish-grey rosettes 1–3 cm across that adhere only lightly to bark. Individual lobes are narrow (roughly 0.8–1 mm), convex and fork repeatedly, giving a neat, antler-like outline. Vegetative propagules are abundant: short, cylindrical isidia arise across the upper surface (laminal) and only rarely on the margins. They may swell into tiny lobes or branch but, importantly, never develop the dark tips seen in A. flavotenuis. (Isidia are microscopic 'sprigs' that break off to spread both partners of the lichen together, serving as asexual reproductive units.)

Internally the medulla – the cotton-wool-like layer beneath the green algal zone – is single-layered and white; no chondroid axis is present. The lower surface lacks a true cortex but bears a discontinuous spongiostratum: a dark felt of intertwining hyphae that traps moisture and debris. Stout black rhizines (root-like anchoring threads) project mainly from the gaps between those patches. Sexual reproductive structures (apothecia) have not been observed in this species.

Chemical spot tests help to distinguish the species: the upper cortex turns yellow with potassium hydroxide solution (K+ yellow) due to atranorin, while the medulla reacts C+ (pink) indicating anziaic acid; other reagent responses are negative. Thin-layer chromatography confirms a mixture of atranorin and anziaic acid.

== Habitat and distribution ==
Anzia mahaeliyensis is known only from Horton Plains National Park in the Central Highlands of Sri Lanka, between 2150 m and 2175 m elevation. It grows as an epiphyte on the smooth bark of both living and dead montane forest trees such as Actinodaphne speciosa, Ilex walkeri, Cinnamomum ovalifolium and Neolitsea fuscata.

The plateau is enveloped by persistent mist, high rainfall and cool temperatures, creating a cloud forest microclimate that favours corticolous (bark-dwelling) lichens. No records exist outside this isolated massif, so the species is regarded as narrowly endemic.
