= Wolseleyidea =

Scientific classification
- Kingdom: Fungi
- Division: Ascomycota
- Class: Lecanoromycetes
- Order: Lecanorales
- Family: Ramalinaceae
- Genus: Wolseleyidea; S.Y.Kondr., Farkas & Lőkös (2019)

Type species
- Wolseleyidea swinscowii (Timdal & Krog) S.Y.Kondr., Farkas & Lőkös (2019)

Species
- W. africana W. byssiseda W. canoumbrina W. furfurella W. ochroxantha W. swinscowii

Genus of lichen-forming fungi

Wolseleyidea is a genus of lichen-forming fungi in the family Ramalinaceae. It consists of six species. The genus was established in 2019 based on DNA analysis that showed these species form a distinct evolutionary lineage separate from the related genus Phyllopsora. Species are characterised by thin, granular thalli with a distinctive reddish-brown prothallus border, small brown disc-shaped fruiting bodies, and a chemical profile that includes methyl 2,7-dichloropsoromate and related compounds. The genus is named in honour of the British lichenologist Pat Wolseley for her contributions to tropical lichen taxonomy, and its species grow primarily on bark in montane and coastal rainforests across the Americas and other tropical regions.

== Taxonomy ==
Wolseleyidea was circumscribed in 2019 by Sergey Kondratyuk, Edit Farkas, and László Lőkös as a separate genus in the Ramalinaceae following a DNA-based study using three gene regions. Their phylogenetic tree recovered a strongly supported, monophyletic Wolseleyidea branch within the broader Biatora group, distinct from both the Ivanpisutia–Myrionora–Biatora lineage and Phyllopsora. The authors fixed Wolseleyidea swinscowii as the type species and, with an expanded sample, showed that the Phyllopsora rosei and P. corallina groups form independent lineages positioned between Phyllopsora and Biatora, and therefore do not belong in Wolseleyidea.

In establishing the genus, six previously described species were transferred into Wolseleyidea. Generic rank was justified by the combined DNA evidence and a consistent set of morphological and chemical features that separate it from Phyllopsora. The name honours the British lichenologist Pat Wolseley for her contributions to tropical lichen taxonomy, including work on Phyllopsora.

== Description ==
Wolseleyidea species form thin, crust-like patches made up of medium-sized green granules. Many specimens grow tiny outgrowths called isidia (minute, crumbly projections that break off to start new colonies) on these granules. A reddish-brown prothallus (a narrow felt-like rim around the thallus) is usually well developed and is one of the most consistent field clues to the genus.

The fruiting bodies are small brown discs (apothecia), typically up to about 1–1.5 mm across, often with a slightly fuzzy, same-coloured rim. Under the microscope the spores are simple (non-septate) and narrowly ellipsoid. In standard lichen spot tests, the inner tissue (medulla) is unreactive to K and C but turns orange with P, reflecting a chemical profile that includes methyl 2,7-dichloropsoromate, methyl 2,7-dichloronorpsoromate, phyllopsorin, chlorophyllopsorin, vicanicin and norvicanicin. These combined traits distinguish Wolseleyidea from the outwardly similar Phyllopsora.

== Habitat and distribution ==
Wolseleyidea species grow on bark, mostly in montane rainforest and coastal forest. They are reported from both the Americas and from tropical regions on other continents.

== Species ==
As of November 2025, six species are accepted in Wolseleyidea:

- Wolseleyidea africana (Timdal & Krog) S.Y.Kondr., Farkas & Lőkös (2019)
- Wolseleyidea byssiseda (Nyl.) S.Y.Kondr., Farkas & Lőkös (2019)
- Wolseleyidea canoumbrina (Vain.) S.Y.Kondr., Farkas & Lőkös (2019)
- Wolseleyidea furfurella (Kistenich & Timdal) S.Y.Kondr., Farkas & Lőkös (2019)
- Wolseleyidea ochroxantha (Nyl.) S.Y.Kondr., Farkas & Lőkös (2019)
- Wolseleyidea swinscowii (Timdal & Krog) S.Y.Kondr., Farkas & Lőkös (2019)
