= Porina microtriseptata =

Scientific classification
- Domain: Eukaryota
- Kingdom: Fungi
- Division: Ascomycota
- Class: Lecanoromycetes
- Order: Gyalectales
- Family: Porinaceae
- Genus: Porina
- Species: P. microtriseptata

Binomial name
- Porina microtriseptata Weerakoon & Aptroot (2016)

Species of lichen

Porina microtriseptata is a species of corticolous, crustose lichen in the family Porinaceae, first described in 2016. This species is distinguished by its shiny, olive-green thallus and hemispherical ascomata with pointed ascospores that are consistently hyaline, fusiform, and have three internal partitions (septa).

== Taxonomy ==
Porina microtriseptata was formally described by the lichenologists Gothamie Weerakoon and André Aptroot in 2016. The type specimen was collected in Sinharaja, Sri Lanka, on the bark of a tree in February 2015.

== Description ==
The thallus of Porina microtriseptata is corticate, smooth, thin, shiny, and continuous, covering areas up to 2 cm in diameter. The colour of the thallus is olive green, surrounded and partly dissected by a thin black prothallus. Isidia are absent. The photobiont is trentepohlioid (i.e., green algae from the genus Trentepohlia). Ascomata (fruiting bodies) are hemispherical, approximately 0.2 mm in diameter, and fully covered by the thallus except for a brown ostiole about 0.1 mm wide. Ascospores are consistently 3-septate, hyaline, fusiform, and pointed, measuring 25–27.5 by 2.5–3.5 μm. They are arranged in two bundles in the ascus, and surrounded by a gelatinous sheath approximately 1.5 μm wide. Pycnidia were not observed to occur in this species.

The thallus of Porina microtriseptata does not react to any of the standard chemical spot tests. Thin-layer chromatography analysis did not detect any substances in the lichen.

== Distribution and habitat ==
This species has been found on a tree in a wet lowland tropical rainforest and at the time of its original publication was known only to occur in Sri Lanka.

== See also ==
- List of Porina species
