= Porina monilisidiata =

Scientific classification
- Domain: Eukaryota
- Kingdom: Fungi
- Division: Ascomycota
- Class: Lecanoromycetes
- Order: Gyalectales
- Family: Porinaceae
- Genus: Porina
- Species: P. monilisidiata

Binomial name
- Porina monilisidiata Weerakoon & Aptroot (2016)

Species of lichen

Porina monilisidiata is a species of corticolous (bark-dwelling), crustose lichen in the family Porinaceae, first described in 2016. This species is characterised by its shiny, olive-green thallus with numerous isidia and low conical ascomata.

== Taxonomy ==
Porina monilisidiata was formally described by the lichenologists Gothamie Weerakoon and André Aptroot in 2016. The type specimen was collected in the Sinharaja Forest Reserve, Sri Lanka, on the bark of a tree on 17 February 2015.

== Description ==
The thallus of Porina monilisidiata is corticate, smooth or slightly rugulose, covering areas up to 10 cm (4 in) in diameter, shiny, continuous, and thin. The colour of the thallus is olive green, surrounded by a thin black prothallus. Isidia are numerous, corticate, the same colour as the thallus, mostly simple, but some are branched, wavy to a bit moniliform, cylindrical, approximately 0.05 mm in diameter and 0.3–0.8 mm high. The algae are trentepohlioid. Ascomata are low conical, approximately 0.7–1.2 mm in diameter, fully covered by a thin layer of thallus through which the dark ascomata appear grey-brown, with a black, 0.1–0.3 mm wide ostiole. Ascospores consistently have nine septa, and measure 65–75 by 10–13 μm. Pycnidia were not observed.

The thallus of Porina monilisidiata does not react with any of the standard chemical spot tests. Thin-layer chromatography analysis did not detect any substances in the lichen.

== Distribution and habitat ==
This species is found on trees in wet lowland tropical rainforests and at the time of its publication, was known only from Sri Lanka.

== See also ==
- List of Porina species
