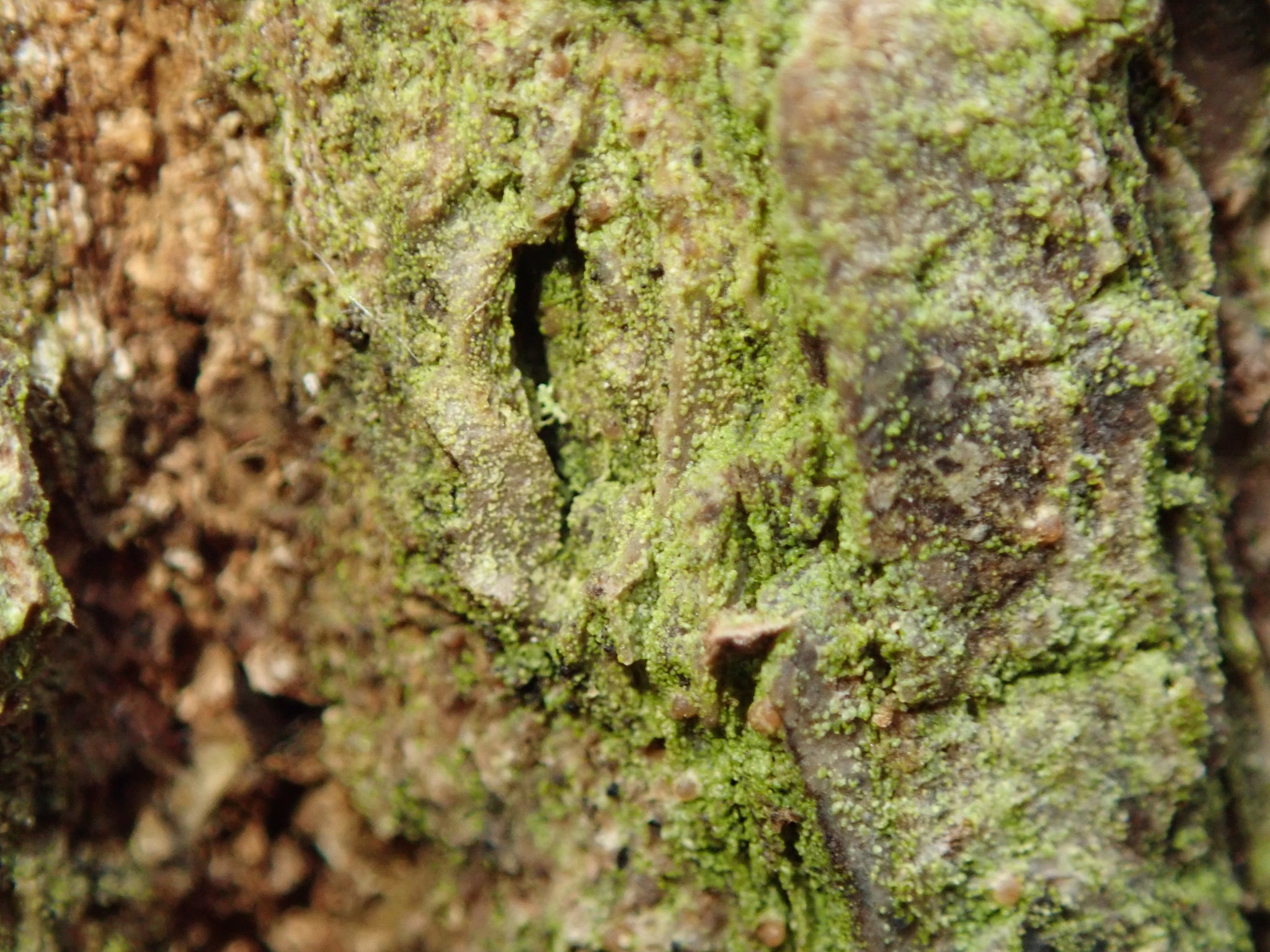
- Psoroglaena dictyospora

Scientific classification
- Domain: Eukaryota
- Kingdom: Fungi
- Division: Ascomycota
- Class: Eurotiomycetes
- Order: Verrucariales
- Family: Verrucariaceae
- Genus: Psoroglaena; Müll.Arg. (1891)

Type species
- Psoroglaena cubensis Müll.Arg. (1891)

Synonyms
- Leucocarpia Vězda (1969); Lithosphaeria Beckh. ex Körb. (1863); Macentina Vězda (1973); Psoroglaenomyces Cif. & Tomas. (1953)

= Psoroglaena =

Genus of lichen-forming fungi

Psoroglaena is a genus of lichen-forming fungi in the family Verrucariaceae. The genus was circumscribed by Johann Müller Argoviensis in 1891, with Psoroglaena cubensis assigned as the type species.

== Description ==
Psoroglaena is characterised by its crustose (crust-like) or minutely filamentous thallus (the main body of the lichen). The cortical cells (outer protective layer) often feature small papillae (tiny nipple-like projections). The photobiont (the photosynthetic partner in the lichen symbiosis) is Auxenochlorella, a green alga belonging to the class Trebouxiophyceae.

The reproductive structures in this genus are perithecia (flask-shaped fruiting bodies with an opening at the top), which are typically pale brown, though rarely dark brown. The surface of these perithecia is generally smooth, but occasionally may display projecting hyphae (fungal filaments) or a distinctive ring-shaped collar. The involucrellum (a protective covering over the perithecium) is absent in this genus.

The exciple (the outer wall of the fruiting body) is usually pale, though it may rarely contain some brown pigmentation. When viewed in cross-section, the cells of the exciple are periclinally elongate (stretched parallel to the surface), sometimes with a surface layer of isodiametric (equal in all dimensions) cells. The hamathecium (the sterile tissue within the fruiting body) consists of periphyses (short filaments lining the ostiole or opening), while interascal filaments are absent. The gel within this tissue turns red when treated with iodine (I+ red).

The asci (spore-producing cells) contain between one and eight spores, are clavate-cylindrical (club-shaped to cylindrical) in form, and show thickening at the apex when young. They do not react with iodine (I-) or potassium iodide (K/I-). The ascospores (spores produced in asci) are transversely septate (divided by cross-walls) to muriform (divided by both longitudinal and transverse walls), ellipsoidal in shape, smooth, lack a perispore (outer spore coating), and are colourless. Conidiomata (asexual reproductive structures) have not been observed in this genus. Chemical analysis reveals no detectable lichen substances.

== Species ==
- Psoroglaena abscondita (Coppins & Vězda) Hafellner & Türk (2001)
- Psoroglaena arachnoidea Herrera-Camp. & Lücking (2004) – Mexico
- Psoroglaena biatorella (Arnold) Lücking & Sérus. (2008)
- Psoroglaena chirisanensis Lőkös, S.Y.Kondr. & Hur (2016) – South Korea
- Psoroglaena coreana S.Y.Kondr., Lőkös & Hur (2016) – South Korea
- Psoroglaena cubensis Müll.Arg. (1891)
- Psoroglaena dictyospora (Orange) H.Harada (2003)
- Psoroglaena epiphylla Lücking (2008) – Costa Rica
- Psoroglaena gangwondoensis S.Y.Kondr., Lőkös, J.-J.Woo & Hur (2018)
- Psoroglaena halmaturina P.M.McCarthy & Kantvilas (2013) – Australia
- Psoroglaena hepaticicola (Döbbeler & Vězda) H.Harada (2003)
- Psoroglaena humidosilvae B.G.Lee (2022) – South Korea
- Psoroglaena japonica H.Harada (2003) – Japan
- Psoroglaena laevigata Lücking (2008) – Costa Rica
- Psoroglaena ornata Herrera-Camp. & Lücking (2004) – Mexico
- Psoroglaena perminuta (Vězda) H.Harada (2003)
- Psoroglaena sorediata Herrera-Camp. & Lücking (2004) – Mexico
- Psoroglaena spinosa Weerakoon & Aptroot (2016) – Sri Lanka
- Psoroglaena stigonemoides (Orange) Henssen (1995)
- Psoroglaena sunchonensis S.Y.Kondr., Lőkös & Hur (2017) – South Korea
