= Lepraria cupressicola =

Scientific classification
- Domain: Eukaryota
- Kingdom: Fungi
- Division: Ascomycota
- Class: Lecanoromycetes
- Order: Lecanorales
- Family: Stereocaulaceae
- Genus: Lepraria
- Species: L. cupressicola

Binomial name
- Lepraria cupressicola (Hue) J.R.Laundon (2008)

Synonyms
- Crocynia cupressicola Hue (1924); Lepraria atrotomentosa Orange & Wolseley (2001)

Species of lichen

Lepraria cupressicola is a species of leprose lichen in the family Stereocaulaceae. It occurs in east and southeast Asia, where it grows on rocks, soil and bark in shaded, damp locations.

== Taxonomy ==
Lepraria cupressicola was originally described by Auguste-Marie Hue in 1924 as Crocynia cupressicola, before being transferred to Lepraria by Jack Laundon in 2008. The type specimen was collected in Japan and is housed in the Kyoto University herbarium (KYO). The species was previously also known as Lepraria atrotomentosa, which was described in 2001 with a type specimen from Sri Lanka, before being recognised as synonymous with L. cupressicola.

== Description ==
Lepraria cupressicola forms a leprose thallus that varies from powdery to membranous in texture. The margin is delimited, with lobes either absent or present. When present, the lobes measure 0.5–2 mm wide and may have a raised marginal rim, though they can sometimes be irregular and less than 0.5 mm wide without a rim. The medulla is present but thin, appearing white. A distinctive feature is the hypothallus, which is usually thick, sometimes thin, lax, and dark brown in colour, forming a tomentum (felt-like mat) under the lobes. The soredia are abundant to sparse, ranging from fine to medium in size, measuring 60–200 μm in diameter. Projecting hyphae are rarely present and short when they occur. The species contains lecanoric acid, atranorin, zeorin and unidentified fatty acids. Chemical spot tests show K+ (yellowish), C+ (pink to red), KC+ (reddish), and Pd+ (yellow).

== Habitat and distribution ==
This species grows on siliceous rock or soil and bark, typically occurring in shaded, sheltered, damp locations. It has been recorded from Japan, China (Hong Kong), Taiwan, and Sri Lanka.
