= Pyrenula inframamillana =

Scientific classification
- Kingdom: Fungi
- Division: Ascomycota
- Class: Eurotiomycetes
- Order: Pyrenulales
- Family: Pyrenulaceae
- Genus: Pyrenula
- Species: P. inframamillana

Binomial name
- Pyrenula inframamillana Aptroot & M.Cáceres (2013)
- Holotype: Parque Natural Municipal, Brazil

Species of lichen-forming fungus

Pyrenula inframamillana is a species of corticolous (bark-dwelling) crustose lichen in the family Pyrenulaceae. The species forms a thin olive-green to olive-brown crust on tree bark and produces solitary cone-shaped fruiting bodies 0.4–0.9 mm across that sit on the thallus surface. Originally described from Rondônia, it has since been found to be widely distributed across Brazil, with records from ten additional states spanning the Amazon basin to the central and northeastern parts of the country.

== Taxonomy ==
This species was described as new by André Aptroot and Marcela Cáceres in 2013. The holotype is from Brazil (Rondônia, Porto Velho, Parque Natural Municipal), collected on tree bark. The authors compared it with the widespread P. mamillana, from which it chiefly differs in ascospore size.

== Description ==
The thallus of this species is thin, olive green to olive brown, smooth and matte, spreading over large areas without a margin. It lacks pseudocyphellae and a prothallus. The perithecia (fruiting bodies) sit on the surface as solitary cones 0.4–0.9 mm across (rarely reaching 1.2 mm) with an apical pore that is brown to black. The hamathecium is packed with minute colorless oil globules. Each ascus contains eight ascospores in a single row. The spores have three cross‑walls (septa) and measure 10–15 μm long by 3.5–4.0 μm wide. Their internal cavities (lumina) are rounded to angular and are no longer than they are wide. A conspicuously thickened inner wall is present at the spore tips. No asexual reproductive structures or secondary metabolites are known.

== Habitat and distribution ==
Pyrenula inframamillana is a corticolous (bark-dwelling) lichen. Since its original collection in Rondônia, it has been shown to be widely distributed in Brazil, having been additionally recorded from the Brazilian states of Acre, Amazonas, Amapá, Paraíba, Pernambuco, Bahia, Mato Grosso, Mato Grosso do Sul, Goiás, and São Paulo .

== See also ==
- List of Pyrenula species
