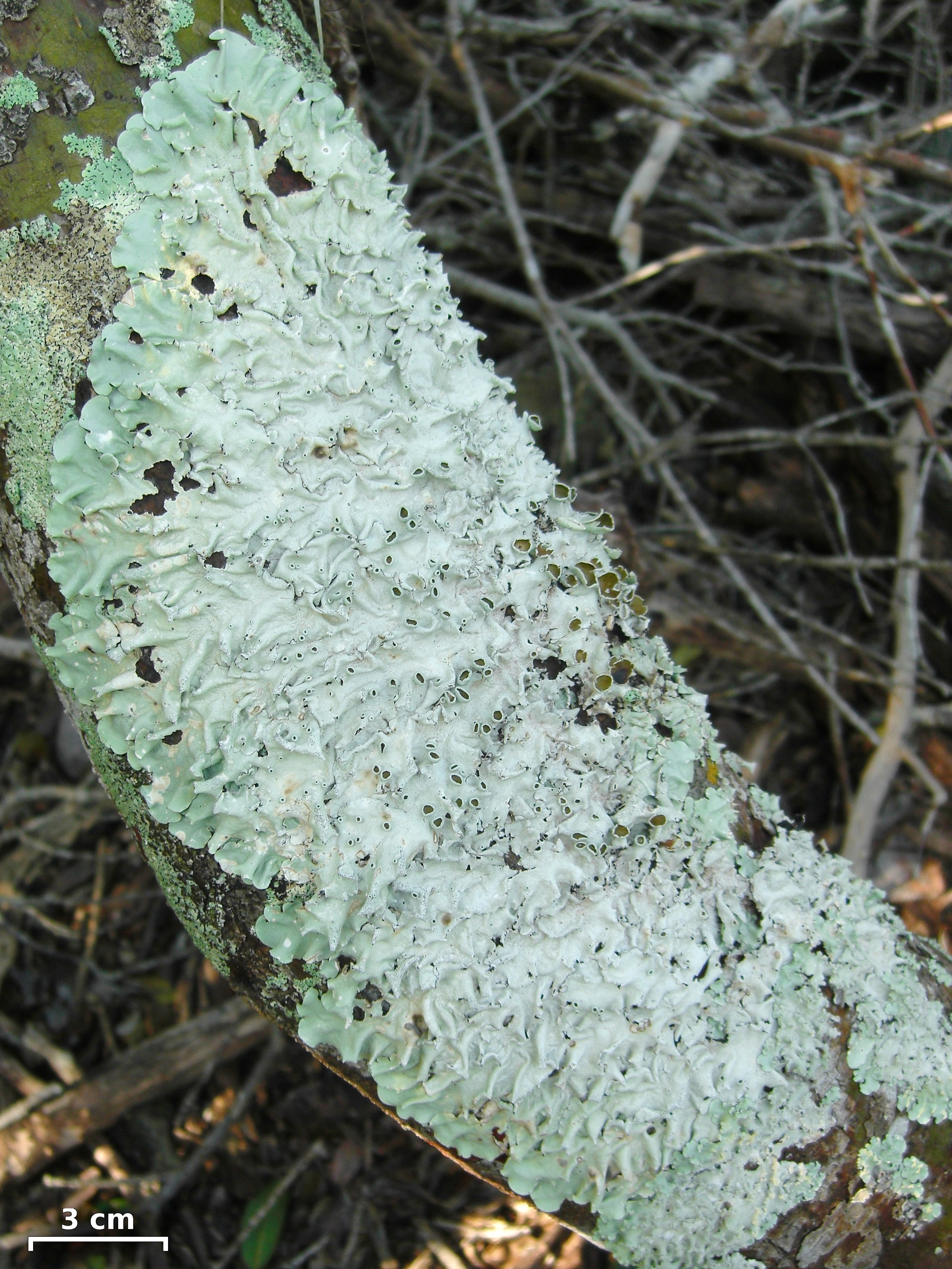
- Found in No Name Key, Florida

Scientific classification
- Domain: Eukaryota
- Kingdom: Fungi
- Division: Ascomycota
- Class: Lecanoromycetes
- Order: Lecanorales
- Family: Parmeliaceae
- Genus: Parmotrema
- Species: P. zollingeri

Binomial name
- Parmotrema zollingeri (Hepp) Hale (1974)

Synonyms
- Parmelia latissima var. corniculata Kremp. (1878); Parmelia zollingeri Hepp (1854); Parmelia bogoriensis (Zahlbr.) Elix (1997)

= Parmotrema zollingeri =

Species of lichen

Parmotrema zollingeri is a species of lichen in the family Parmeliaceae. It was originally described in 1860 as a species of Parmelia by German lichenologist Johann Adam Philipp Hepp, and named after Swiss botanist Heinrich Zollinger. Mason Hale transferred it to the genus Parmotrema in 1974.

The lichen has a pantropical distribution, and has been recorded in Australia, East Africa, North, Central, and South America, and Southeast Asia.

== Description ==
Parmotrema zollingeri has a leathery thallus made of flat to concave lobes that are roughly laminate (divided into deep narrow irregular segments). Its spores measure 18–25 by 7–10 μm, while its conidia are more or less lageniform in shape (dilated below and tapering to a slender neck). The major secondary compounds in the medulla are fumarprotocetraric acid and succinoprotocetraric acid, while protocetraric acid is present in minor or trace amounts.

== See also ==
- List of Parmotrema species
