= Ipanema, Rio Grande do Sul =

Neighborhood in Porto Alegre, Brazil

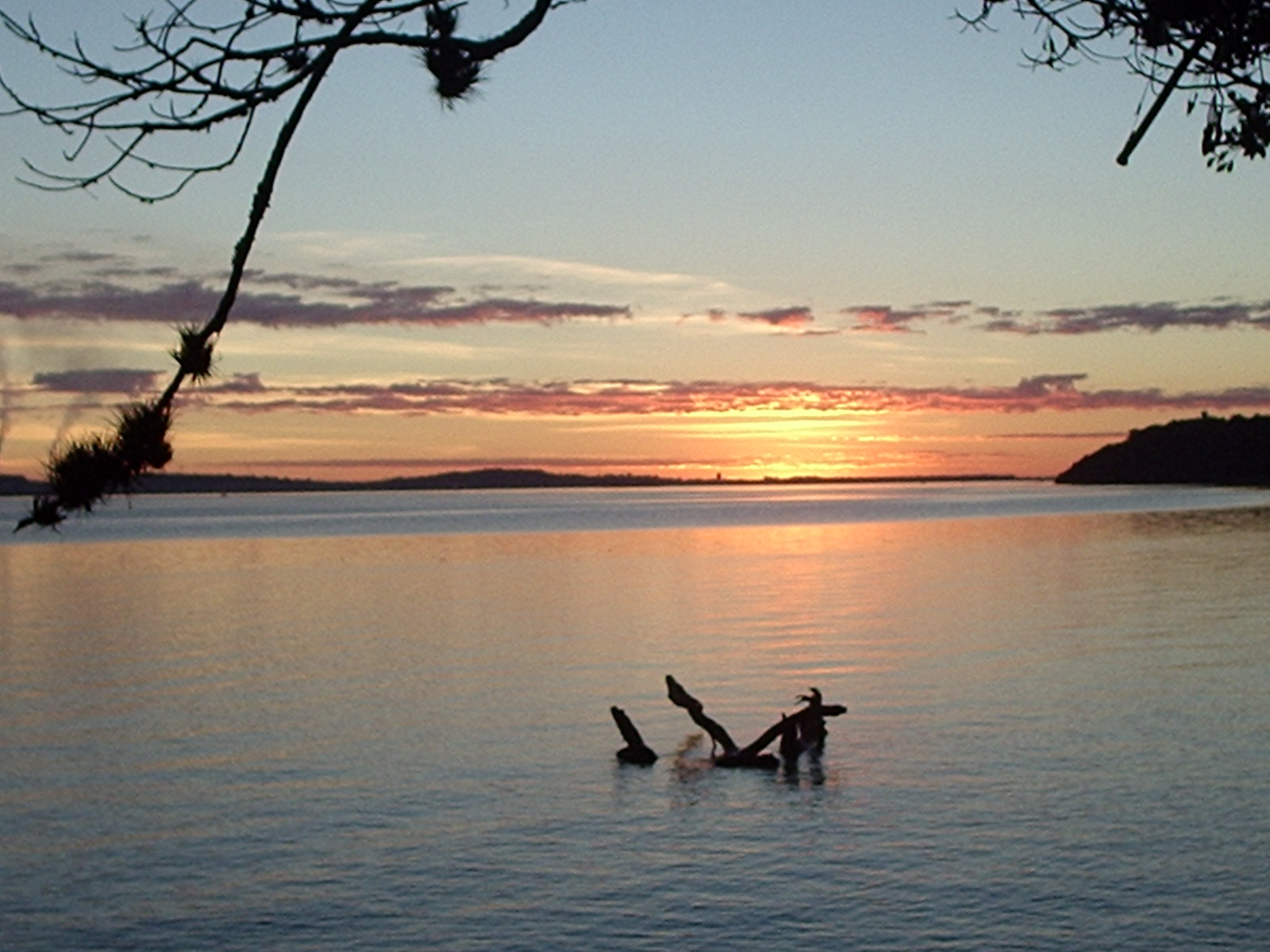
The Guaíba seen from Ipanema beach.

Ipanema is a neighbourhood (bairro) in the city of Porto Alegre, the state capital of Rio Grande do Sul, in Brazil. It was created by Law 2022 from December 7, 1959.

Located on the bank of Guaíba Lake, Ipanema is considered part of the South Zone (Zona Sul) in the city.

== History ==
In the early 20th century, the beach of Ipanema was still uninhabited, being more a rural area of Porto Alegre.

The first dweller of Ipanema was Oswaldo Coufal, who acquired a big property in order to divide it into land lots. Coufal and his family loved Rio de Janeiro, where they used to spend theirs holidays. For this reason the neighbourhood was named after Ipanema in Rio de Janeiro, whose beach is famous worldwide. Despite the mutual names, these two places are quite different from each other: the one from Rio is home to luxury apartment blocks overlooking the sea and the one from Porto Alegre, to middle class houses and some few upper middle class and upper class houses near Guaíba Lake.

The streets in Ipanema were named after Rio Grande do Sul coast beaches, like Atlântida, Cassino, Capão da Canoa, Cidreira, Torres and Tramandaí.

In 1937, the Santuário de Nossa Senhora Aparecida, designed in a Spanish Colonial architecture style, was inaugurated in Ipanema. However, roots of Eucalyptus trees planted nearby the church broke its walls, and the building was condemned by the prefecture. In 1960, the first modern church in Porto Alegre was built in its place.

Also, there is located a private school of the city, the Marista Ipanema school.
