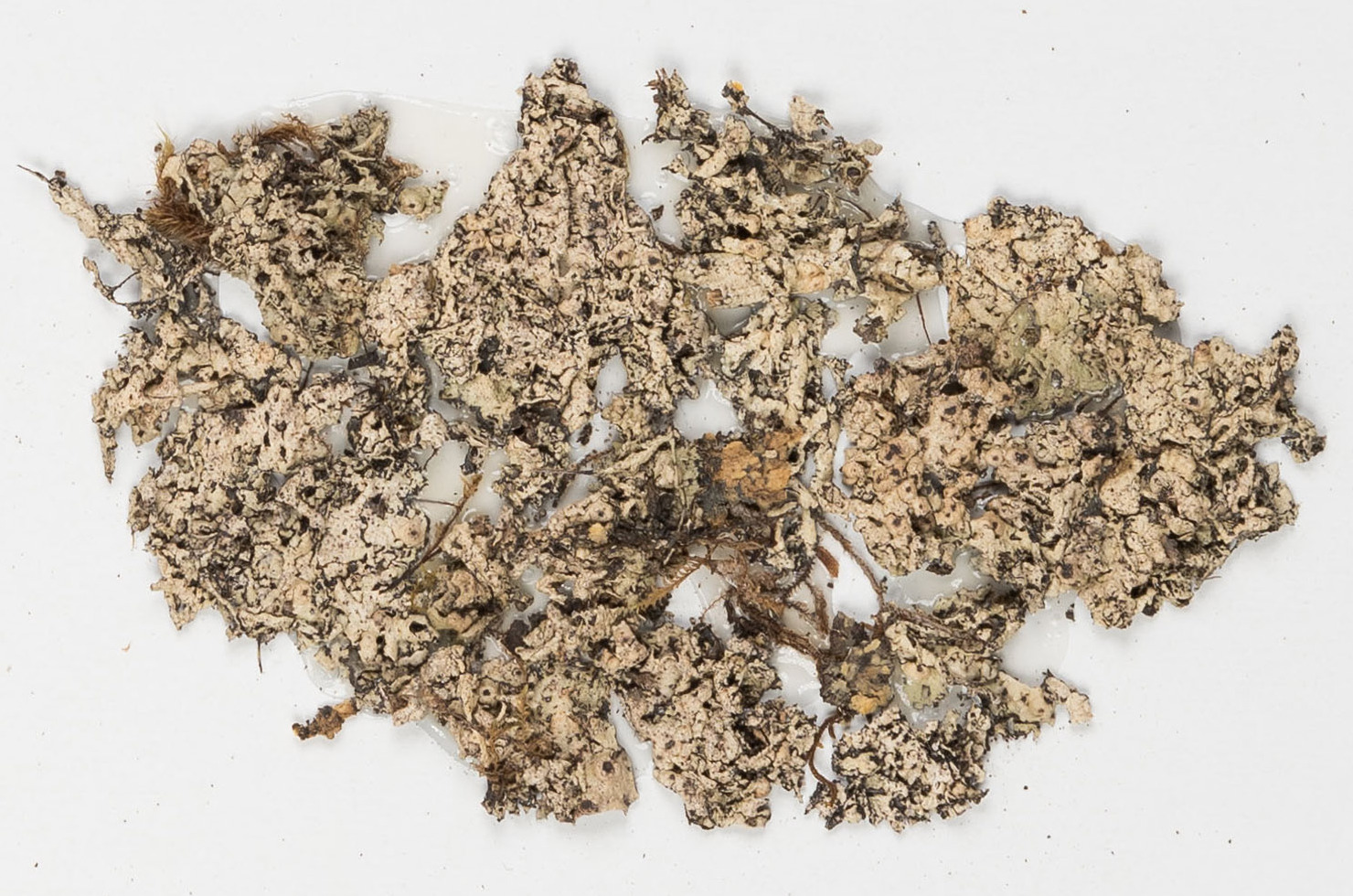
- Herbarium specimen collected from Réunion by the New York Botanical Garden

Scientific classification
- Domain: Eukaryota
- Kingdom: Fungi
- Division: Ascomycota
- Class: Lecanoromycetes
- Order: Gyalectales
- Family: Porinaceae
- Genus: Porina
- Species: P. americana

Binomial name
- Porina americana Fée

Synonyms
- Synonymy: Pertusaria americana (Fée) Mont.; Porophora americana (Fée) Spreng.

= Porina americana =

Species of lichen

Porina americana is a species of lichen in the family Porinaceae. It has a pantropical distribution, and was formally described in 1824 by Antoine Laurent Apollinaire Fée.

== Description ==
Porina americana varies between pale grey-brown, pale yellow-brown or pale grey-green in colour. It can be differentiated from Porina nucula due to having larger ascospores and a greater number of septae.

== Taxonomy ==
The species was first described by Antoine Laurent Apollinaire Fée in 1824.

== Distribution ==
The species has a Pantropical distribution, known from Colombia, India, Sri Lanka and Thailand, and in 2016 was first identified as being present at Swanson, Auckland, New Zealand.
