= Psoroglaena spinosa =

Scientific classification
- Domain: Eukaryota
- Kingdom: Fungi
- Division: Ascomycota
- Class: Eurotiomycetes
- Order: Verrucariales
- Family: Verrucariaceae
- Genus: Psoroglaena
- Species: P. spinosa

Binomial name
- Psoroglaena spinosa Weerakoon & Aptroot (2016)

Species of lichen

Psoroglaena spinosa is a species of lichen in the family Verrucariaceae, first described in 2016. It is characterized by its small fruticose (bushy) thallus, which is corticate, smooth, dull, and bright green, covering small areas and consisting of tiny squamules that branch into somewhat moniliform threads.

== Taxonomy ==
Psoroglaena spinosa was formally described by the lichenologists Gothamie Weerakoon and André Aptroot in 2016. The type specimen was collected in the Sinharaja Forest Reserve in Sri Lanka on 15 February 2015.

== Description ==
The thallus of Psoroglaena spinosa is microfruticose, consisting of tiny squamules dissected into branched, somewhat moniliform threads that are almost equally wide along their entire length, about 20–25 μm in width. These threads, for the most part, lie in one plane, with some parts emerging in other directions. The branching is dichotomous anisotomic. The cortex is hyaline (translucent), papillose, with dense and high papillae, approximately 1 μm wide and 2 μm high. The algae are chlorococcoid, measuring about 4–6 μm in diameter, 2–3-seriate (arranged in rows), but unordered. Ascomata and pycnidia were not observed to occur in this species.

The chemical composition of Psoroglaena spinosa was not evaluated in the study.

== Distribution and habitat ==
This species is found on trees in wet lowland tropical rainforests and at the time of its publication was known only to occur in Sri Lanka.
