= Ilex walkeri =

Scientific classification
- Kingdom: Plantae
- Clade: Tracheophytes
- Clade: Angiosperms
- Clade: Eudicots
- Clade: Asterids
- Order: Aquifoliales
- Family: Aquifoliaceae
- Genus: Ilex
- Species: I. walkeri

Binomial name
- Ilex walkeri Wight & Gardner ex Thwaites

Species of holly

Ilex walkeri is a species of plant in the family Aquifoliaceae. It is a large tree that is native to India and Sri Lanka.
