= Pyrenula aggregataspistea =

Scientific classification
- Kingdom: Fungi
- Division: Ascomycota
- Class: Eurotiomycetes
- Order: Pyrenulales
- Family: Pyrenulaceae
- Genus: Pyrenula
- Species: P. aggregataspistea

Binomial name
- Pyrenula aggregataspistea Aptroot & M.Cáceres (2013)
- Holotype: Parque Natural Municipal, Porto Velho, Brazil

Species of lichen-forming fungus

Pyrenula aggregataspistea is a species of corticolous (bark-dwelling) crustose lichen in the family Pyrenulaceae. The species forms a thin glossy chocolate-brown crust on tree bark and produces tiny cone-shaped fruiting bodies 0.3–0.4 mm in diameter that typically grow in clusters of 3 to 20, with adjacent cones often pressing together and partly fusing. It is widely distributed across Brazil, having been recorded from ten states spanning the Amazon region, northeastern coast, and central parts of the country, where it grows on smooth bark in lowland rainforests.

== Taxonomy ==
Pyrenula aggregataspistea was described as a new species in 2013 by André Aptroot and Marcela Cáceres. The name is based on a collection from primary rainforest in the municipal nature park at Porto Velho, Rondônia, Brazil, at about 100 m elevation, where it grew on the bark of a Ceiba samaúma tree. The designated type specimen (Cáceres & Aptroot 11216) serves as the name-bearing reference (holotype) and is deposited in the herbarium of the Federal University of Sergipe (ISE). In their diagnosis, the authors characterised the species by its clustered sexual fruiting bodies (ascomata) and by comparatively small spores (ascospores) with three internal cross-walls (3-septate), measuring 11–13 × 3.5–5.0 μm. These features, taken together, set it apart from other species of Pyrenula.

== Description ==
The thallus of Pyrenula aggregataspistea is a thin, glossy crust that spreads widely over the bark and is chocolate brown in color. It lacks pseudocyphellae (minute pale pores or cracks for gas exchange) and it also lacks a prothallus, the pale or fibrous border that can form a margin around other crusts. The sexual fruiting bodies sit on the surface as tiny cones (0.3–0.4 mm in diameter), usually grouped in clusters of about 3–20. Adjacent cones often press together so their sides partly fuse, but each retains its own opening (the ostiole), which is at the tip and appears yellowish. Inside, the tissue between the spore sacs (the hamathecium) is clear and not filled with oily droplets or granules. Each spore sac (ascus) contains eight ascospores arranged in two uneven rows. The spores have three internal cross-walls (3-septate) and measure 11–13 × 3.5–5.0 μm. Their internal cavities (lumina) are angular: the central cavities are broader than long, while the end cavities are longer than wide. The inner spore wall (endospore) is conspicuously thickened at the tips. Asexual fruiting bodies (pycnidia) were not seen, and routine chemical tests detected no lichen substances.

== Habitat and distribution ==
Pyrenula aggregataspistea is a corticolous lichen, grows on the smooth bark of trees on lowland rainforests. It is widely distributed in Brazil, having been recorded from several states: Acre, Amazonas, Rondônia, Pará, Amapá, Maranhão, Rio Grande do Norte, Sergipe, Bahia, and Mato Grosso.

== See also ==
- List of Pyrenula species
