= Pat Wolseley =

Botanist

- Born: Patricia A. Wolseley; 1938 (age 87–88)
- Education: Somerville College, Oxford
- Occupation: Botanist
- Known for: lichens as indicators of air quality; tropical lichens
- Pat Wolseley's voice Recorded August 2012 from the BBC Radio 4 programme The Life Scientific

Pat Wolseley (born 1938) is a British botanist and illustrator, specialising in lichen.

Patricia Anne Wolsely studied botany at Somerville College, Oxford and then was employed at the Natural History Museum, London from 1960. She had always made illustrations of her research and later attended an art school. From 1966 until 1977 she worked at the University of Malta then returning to the Natural History Museum in London first as a Leverhulme Research Fellow and then as a Scientific Associate.

Wolseley studied aquatic plants for a decade and then moved on to lichens. This change was prompted by attending a course about lichens and she was attracted by their diversity and beauty. Her first research project about lichens, working with Peter James, was in the Celtic rain forest on the west Wales coast which resulted in adding 250 species to the list of those present in the area. She has subsequently worked at many sites in the UK and also other countries. The effects of the composition of the air on lichens, particularly sulphur and nitrogen compounds, is a focus of her work. The age of the substrate on which the lichens are growing provides information on past air composition, since species differ in their tolerance or sensitivity to compounds like ammonia, nitrogen oxides or sulphur dioxide. She collaborates with the Centre for Ecology and Hydrology for measurements of ammonia in the air.

From 2007 she worked in the Open Air Laboratories (OPAL) network, a citizen science project that aimed to increase public interest in science through enabling them to record environmental data for scientists. Wolseley created the air survey for OPAL because of her knowledge about the relationship between lichens and air quality.

From 2006 until 2008 Wolseley was President of the British Lichen Society and in 2008 was made an Honorary member of the society.

In 2012, she featured in an episode of BBC Radio 4's The Life Scientific.

She has long-term collaborations on lichens in tropical forests in South-East Asia including Thailand, Malaysia, Vietnam and Indonesia, using lichens as indicators of environmental change considering air quality and logging. This has involved developing keys and checklists for the local lichen floras as well as identifying new species.

In 2021 she was awarded the Marsh Botany Award by the Marsh Charitable Trust in recognition of her pioneering work on lichens as indicators of air pollution as well as work on training in identification of lichens. The lichen genus Wolseleyidea was named in her honour in 2019.

== Publications ==
Wolseley is co-author and illustrator of a number of books. These include:

- Heather Angel and Pat Wolseley (1992) Family Water Naturalist: a practical expedition to the worlds of ponds, rivers and the sea shore Bloomsbury Books, ISBN 978 1854710376 192pp
- Francis Rose and Pat Wolseley (1984) Nettlecombe Park: Its History and Its Epiphytic Lichens - An Attempt at Correlation Academic Journal Offprint from The Journal of the Field Studies Council, Volume 6, No. 1, November 1984. 50 pp, 14 figs ISBN 978 1851531653
- Sylvia Haslam, Charles Sinker and Pat Wolseley (1982), British Water Plants, Field Studies Council
- Pat Wolseley (1981) Field Key to the Flowering Plants of Iceland, Hydra Books, ISBN 978 0906191422

She is also the author or co-author of at least 30 scientific publications and book chapters. These include:

- Christopher J. Ellis, Claudia E. Steadman, Massimo Vieno, Sudipt Chatterjee and ten other co-authors including Pat Wolseley (2022) Estimating nitrogen risk to Himalayan forests using thresholds for lichen bioindicators. Biological Conservation Volume 265, 109401 DOI10.1016/j.biocon.2021.109401
- Wolseley, PA, James, PW, Theobald, MR and Sutton, MA (2006) Detecting changes in epiphytic lichen communities at sites affected by atmospheric ammonia from agricultural sources. The Lichenologist volume 38 161-176 DOI 10.1017/S0024282905005487
- Nimis, PL, Scheidegger, C and Wolseley, PA (2002) Monitoring with lichens - Monitoring lichens. Editors of NATO Advanced Research Workshop on Lichen Monitoring in Wales, August 16–23, 2000 ISBN 978-1-4020-0429-2
- Wolseley, PA and Aguirre Hudson, B (1997) The ecology and distribution of lichens in tropical deciduous and evergreen forests of northern Thailand. Journal of Biogeography volume 24 327-343 DOI10.1046/j.1365-2699.1997.00124.x

== See also ==
- Category:Taxa named by Pat Wolseley
