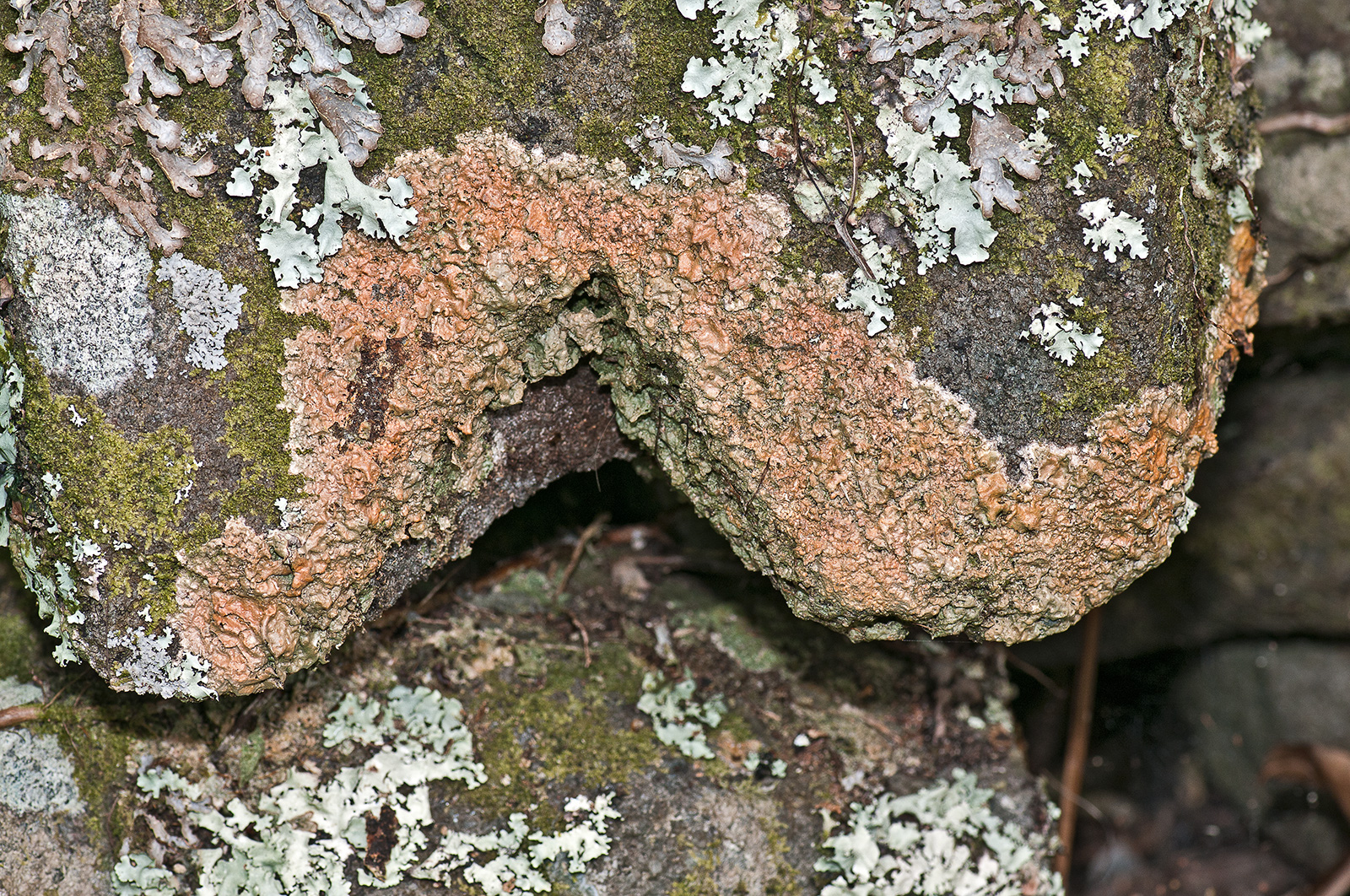
- Porina exocha

Scientific classification
- Domain: Eukaryota
- Kingdom: Fungi
- Division: Ascomycota
- Class: Lecanoromycetes
- Order: Gyalectales
- Family: Porinaceae
- Genus: Porina; Ach. (1809)

Type species
- Porina nucula Ach. (1809)

Species
- 161

= Porina =

Genus of fungi

Porina is a genus of crustose lichens in the family Porinaceae. As of August 2024, Species Fungorum (in the Catalogue of Life) accepts 161 species of Porina.

== Taxonomy ==
The genus was circumscribed in 1809 by the Swedish lichenologist Erik Acharius. His diagnosis of the genus was as follows (translated from Latin): "Apothecium wart-like, formed from the thallus, including several thalamia covered by a very delicate, transparent perithecium, marked above by impressed ostioles; nuclei somewhat globose, containing cellular vesicles. Thallus cartilaginous-membranous, uniform". Acharius included a single species in the genus, Porina pertusa (originally named by Carl Linnaeus in 1767 as Lichen pertusus); this species is now known as Pertusaria pertusa.

== Description ==
The genus Porina comprises crustose lichens, characterised by their crust-like appearance that can range from being completely immersed in their substrate to sitting on the surface. The thallus, or body of the lichen, may or may not have a protective outer layer called the cortex. Sometimes, an additional layer of dead cells known as the epinecral layer is present. The internal structure, or medulla, is often not well-defined. Some species within this genus may develop isidia—small outgrowths that aid in vegetative reproduction—or, more rarely, soralia, which are structures that produce soredia for reproduction. The photosynthetic partner, or photobiont, in Porina is typically green alga from the genus Trentepohlia. However, in species that grow on leaves (foliicolous species), the photobiont can be Phycopeltis.

Porina lichens produce perithecioid ascomata, which are flask-shaped structures where spores develop. These can be either embedded in the thallus, prominently protruding, or forming pits in limestone. The exciple, which is the outer layer of the ascomata, may contain dark pigments. Additionally, an involucrellum—a layer of thick-walled cells—may be present, sometimes containing photobiont cells or crystals.

The internal structure of the ascomata, or hamathecium, is made up of paraphyses, which are generally unbranched filaments, and may or may not include periphyses (small filaments within the ascomata). The gel within the hymenium (the fertile inner layer) does not react with iodine (I–) or potassium iodide (K/I–).

The asci, which are the spore-producing cells, are clavate-cylindrical (club-shaped to cylindrical) and thin-walled. They are functionally unitunicate, meaning they open by splitting at the apex without any extruded layers. Depending on the species, the apex of the ascus may be truncate and have a refractive ring that stains with Congo red, or it can be rounded and lack this ring.

Ascospores in Porina are typically colourless and can have three to many transverse septa (divisions), occasionally also having one to three longitudinal septa. They are usually narrowly ellipsoidal to needle-like (acicular) and smooth, often enclosed in a perispore. The arrangement of spores within the ascus is generally irregularly biseriate (arranged in two rows). Porina also produces pycnidia, which are asexual reproductive structures. The conidia (asexual spores) are usually aseptate (without internal partitions), ranging from cylindric-ellipsoidal to rod-shaped or, more rarely, filiform (thread-like).

Chemically, Porina species lack acetone-soluble secondary metabolites but contain at least four acetone-insoluble pigments. Among these, a yellow to orange pigment, reacting K+ (orange or dark orange) and hydrochloric acid (HCl+ yellow to orange), is known as Porina-yellow. This pigment is prevalent in various species such as P. ahlesiana, P. lectissima, and P. leptalea. Additionally, Porina lichens have various dark pigments that are often mixed and challenging to differentiate, with one distinctive pigment being purple-violet, reacting K+ (dark bluish-grey) and hydrochloric acid (HCl+ purple to red-purple).
