= Trichothelium caudatum =

Scientific classification
- Domain: Eukaryota
- Kingdom: Fungi
- Division: Ascomycota
- Class: Lecanoromycetes
- Order: Gyalectales
- Family: Porinaceae
- Genus: Trichothelium
- Species: T. caudatum

Binomial name
- Trichothelium caudatum Lücking (2004)

Species of lichen

Trichothelium caudatum is a species of corticolous (bark-dwelling), crustose lichen in the family Porinaceae. Found in Bolivia, Ecuador, and Peru, it was formally described as a new species in 2004 by lichenologist Robert Lücking. The species epithet refers to its characteristic caudate ascospores, i.e., tapering and elongated, with a tail-like extension at one end.

== Description ==
Trichothelium caudatum has a continuous, smooth thallus that is pale yellowish-green in colour, and can grow up to 2 cm (0.8 in) across. The photobiont is Trenepohlia (a green algal genus), with cells forming continuous plates. Perithecia are hemispherical to somewhat spherical and black, measuring 0.25 to 0.30 mm in diameter. The lichen is characterized by its 7 to 15 perithecial setae, arranged in 3 to 6 irregular groups forming a horizontal crown. The setae are bristle-shaped to narrowly acute or lanceolate, rarely fin-shaped, and measure 0.25 to 0.40 mm in length. The asci of Trichothelium caudatum are obclavate, with dimensions of 100–130 by 15–20 μm. Ascospores are distinctly tapering to clavate-caudate with a tail-like proximal end, 9–13-septate, colourless, and measure 55–75 by 5–8 μm. Pycnidia (structures bearing conidia) have not been observed in this species.

== Distribution ==
Trichothelium caudatum occurs in the Neotropics, with its type collection being from Peru. It was later reported from Bolivia and Ecuador. The species is distinguished by its strongly tapering and caudate ascospores, a feature considered specific to the species. It is closely related to Trichothelium kalbii, but can be differentiated by its shorter, fusiform ascospores and shorter, more irregularly arranged perithecial setae.
