= Trichothelium subargenteum =

Scientific classification
- Kingdom: Fungi
- Division: Ascomycota
- Class: Lecanoromycetes
- Order: Gyalectales
- Family: Porinaceae
- Genus: Trichothelium
- Species: T. subargenteum

Binomial name
- Trichothelium subargenteum Flakus & Lücking (2008)
- Holotype: Nuevos Reyes village, Bolivia

Species of lichen

Trichothelium subargenteum is a species of foliicolous (leaf-dwelling) crustose lichen in the family Porinaceae. Found in Bolivia, it was scientifically described in 2008 by the lichenologists Adam Flakus and Robert Lücking. The specific epithet subargenteum refers to its similarity to another species, T. argenteum, which has been found in Costa Rica and Argentina.

== Description ==
Trichothelium subargenteum forms a thin layer (the thallus) on the surface of leaves. This layer is continuous in the centre and more scattered at the edges, covering areas 3–10 mm in diameter. The thallus is grey-green in colour and smooth, sometimes with faint crystals visible under special lighting conditions. The lichen's algal partner is Phycopeltis, with angular-rounded cells measuring 9–18 by 4–8 μm. The fungal partner produces small, globe-shaped reproductive structures called perithecia. These are black, measure 0.25–0.35 mm in diameter, and are adorned with 8–20 pointed bristles (setae) that are black at the base and white at the tip. These setae are 0.25–0.40 mm long (occasionally up to 0.5 mm) and give the entire structure a diameter of 0.4–0.7 mm (occasionally up to 1.0 mm).

Inside the perithecia are the asci, which produce the lichen's spores. Each ascus contains eight ascospores. The spores are colourless, rod-shaped to narrowly spindle-shaped (fusiform) with rounded ends, and have seven internal cross-walls (septa). They measure 35–50 by 4.5–6.5 μm.

=== Similar species ===
Trichothelium subargenteum is most closely related to T. argenteum, but can be distinguished by its shorter bristles around the perithecia and longer spores. T. argenteum also forms disc-like structures in young perithecia, which are not observed in T. subargenteum. Another species, T. africanum, shares some similarities but differs in having smaller perithecia and spores, with bristles that are white in the entire upper half.

Trichothelium ulei is another close relative, sharing similarly long, rod-shaped spores with seven cross-walls. However, it can be differentiated by its distinct algal arrangement, smaller perithecia with purely black bristles forming a horizontal, shiny crown, and slightly narrower spores. Trichothelium alboatrum bears some resemblance to T. subargenteum but is set apart by its smaller perithecia adorned with fewer, entirely whitish bristles and its smaller spores.

Another lookalike, T. pallidesetum, shows similarities in its perithecial structure, although these are smaller than those of T. subargenteum. It is further distinguished by its longer spores, which typically have 9–11 cross-walls, occasionally up to 12. These subtle but consistent differences in morphological features, particularly in the structure of perithecia and the characteristics of spores, are crucial for accurate identification and classification within the genus Trichothelium.

== Habitat and distribution ==
As of its initial description, Trichothelium subargenteum had only been found in one location: near the village of Nuevos Reyes in the Beni Department of Bolivia (José Ballivián Province). This area is part of the lowland southwest Amazon rainforest, at an elevation of about 190 m (620 ft) above sea level. It was growing on the leaves of an unspecified vascular plant. The species has since been recorded from other locations in Bolivia, including the Manuripi and Federico Román Provinces.
