= Trichothelium longisetum =

Scientific classification
- Kingdom: Fungi
- Division: Ascomycota
- Class: Lecanoromycetes
- Order: Gyalectales
- Family: Porinaceae
- Genus: Trichothelium
- Species: T. longisetum

Binomial name
- Trichothelium longisetum P.M.McCarthy & Palice (2003)

Species of lichen

Trichothelium longisetum is a little-known species of wood-dwelling, crustose lichen in the family Porinaceae. Found in northeastern Ecuador, it was formally described as a new species by lichenologists Patrick M. McCarthy and Zdeněk Palice in 2003. The species epithet longisetum refers to the long, narrow setae that characterize this species.

== Description ==
The thallus of Trichothelium longisetum is crustose, thin, and greyish-brown in colour, with a trentepohlioid (green algal) photobiont that does not form radiating plates. The perithecia are numerous, superficial, more or less spherical, and black, measuring 0.52 to 1.58 mm in diameter. These perithecia are notable for their long, narrow, and numerous black setae.

The ascospores are colourless, elongate to bacilliform with a length of 42 to 64 μm, and contain multiple septa. Conidiomata (structures bearing conidia), have not been observed in this species.

Trichothelium longisetum has some similarities to the foliicolous Trichothelium ulei, but can be distinguished from this species by its larger ascospores that have more septa.

== Habitat and distribution ==
Trichothelium longisetum has only been found in Napo Province, Ecuador. The type specimen was collected by the second author from Yasuní National Park at an altitude of 300 m (980 ft), where it was growing on the wood of a tree stump in a rainforest. This habitat is unique among the predominantly foliicolous, or leaf-dwelling, species in the genus Trichothelium. The species' occurrence on wood sets it apart from its closest relatives, which are typically found on leaves.
