= Myeloconis parva =

Scientific classification
- Kingdom: Fungi
- Division: Ascomycota
- Class: Lecanoromycetes
- Order: Gyalectales
- Family: Porinaceae
- Genus: Myeloconis
- Species: M. parva

Binomial name
- Myeloconis parva P.M.McCarthy & Elix (1996)

Species of lichen

Myeloconis parva is a species of corticolous (bark-dwelling), crustose lichen in the family Porinaceae. Found in Amazonian Brazil, it was formally described as a new species in 1996 by Patrick M. McCarthy and John Elix.

== Description ==
Myeloconis parva has a thallus that is grayish or greenish-brown, and can grow up to 6–10 cm (2.4–3.9 in) or more wide. The thallus is continuous, with a matte to slightly glossy surface that is closely appressed or somewhat raised near the margin. Closer to the centre, the thallus is raised, peeling and flaking, and very uneven, and is approximately 30–100 μm thick. The lichen has no cortex, but has an uppermost layer that is amorphous and 6–10 μm thick. The algal cells are 5–12 by 5–10 μm, and the medulla contains masses of sulphur-yellow crystals that are sometimes exposed. When treated with K, the crystals turn reddish, but they do not fluoresce under UV light. The hyphae are 2–3 μm wide, and the prothallus is thin, dark brown to almost black.

Ascomata are very uncommon in Myeloconis parva, and are mostly immature. They are almost entirely immersed in the thallus and have an outwardly inconspicuous appearance. The ascomata are irregularly convex thalline swellings, each with a shallow, 70–100 μm diameter, apical depression and a minute, medium to dark brown ostiole. The ascomatal wall is dark olive-brown to almost black, 50–90 μm thick near the apex, and 40–60 μm thick at the base. The excipulum is pale to medium brown and is approximately 20 μm thick. The centrum is spherical and is 0.2–0.4 mm in diameter, while the hamathecial filaments are 0.7–1 μm thick. Mature asci have not been observed. The ascospores are fusiform to elongate-fusiform and are irregularly massed or biseriate in the asci. They have 21–26 transverse divisions, with each loculus having 1 or 2 (sometimes 3) longitudinal or diagonal divisions. The ascospores have a 2–3 μm-thick wall and are 94–132 by 18–23 μm in size.
