= Polycornum =

Scientific classification
- Domain: Eukaryota
- Kingdom: Fungi
- Division: Ascomycota
- Class: Lecanoromycetes
- Order: Gyalectales
- Family: Porinaceae
- Genus: Polycornum; Malcolm & Vezda

Genus of fungi

Polycornum is a genus of lichenized fungi in the family Porinaceae.
