= Trichothelium kalbii =

Scientific classification
- Domain: Eukaryota
- Kingdom: Fungi
- Division: Ascomycota
- Class: Lecanoromycetes
- Order: Gyalectales
- Family: Porinaceae
- Genus: Trichothelium
- Species: T. kalbii

Binomial name
- Trichothelium kalbii Lücking (2004)

Species of lichen

Trichothelium kalbii is a species of corticolous (bark-dwelling), crustose lichen in the family Porinaceae. It was formally described as a new species in 2004 by Robert Lücking. The lichen is named in honour of lichenologist Klaus Kalb, who has made significant contributions to the study of tropical lichens. The type specimen was collected by Kalb from south of Cuenca, Ecuador, at an elevation of 3,200 m (10,500 ft).

The perithecia of Trichothelium kalbii are hemispherical to more or less spherical, with a diameter of 0.25–0.40 mm and are black in colour. The perithecial setae, numbering 10–25, form a horizontal crown or are sometimes irregularly scattered in 2–3 layers. The setae are triangular-acute to bristle-shaped, short, and pure black, although their tips can be pale. The lichen's asci are obclavate to fusiform and its ascospores are narrowly fusiform, colourless, and 7–9 times as long as they are broad.

Trichothelium kalbii has an amphipacific distribution, found in three geographically distant locations: the Caribbean (Dominican Republic), South America (Ecuador), and Papua New Guinea. The species is intermediate in form between some foliicolous species and the corticolous T. angustisporum. Its ascospores are irregularly septate, fusiform, and much broader than those in foliicolous T. bipindense. Morphologically, the perithecia of T. kalbii resemble those of T. bipindense, but their partly irregular arrangement of setae is also similar to that of T. angustisporum and T. horridulum.
