= Pseudosagedia grandis =

Scientific classification
- Kingdom: Fungi
- Division: Ascomycota
- Class: Lecanoromycetes
- Order: Gyalectales
- Family: Porinaceae
- Genus: Pseudosagedia
- Species: P. grandis

Binomial name
- Pseudosagedia grandis (Körb.) Hafellner & Kalb (1995)

Synonyms
- Sagedia grandis Körb. (1863); Segestrella grandis (Körb.) Rostr. (1870); Porina grandis (Körb.) Zahlbr. (1922); Porina guentheri var. grandis (Körb.) Swinscow (1962)

Species of lichen-forming fungus

Pseudosagedia grandis is a species of saxicolous (rock-dwelling) crustose lichen in the family Porinaceae. The lichen forms thin to moderately thick olive-green to blackish crusts on rock surfaces, with characteristically large flask-shaped fruiting bodies that are semi-embedded in the thallus. It occurs specifically in the splash zones of mountain streams and watercourses, where it benefits from regular water misting and high humidity in shaded situations. The species is very rare in Europe, restricted to high mountain ranges including the Black Forest of Germany and the Giant Mountains of Poland and the Czech Republic, where it has been known since its original description in 1863.

== Taxonomy ==
Pseudosagedia grandis was first described by the German lichenologist Gustav Wilhelm Körber as a new species under the name Sagedia grandis (the original name, or basionym). In the protologue (the first formal published description), Körber based the species on material he collected on "dripping basalt rocks" at the Kleine Schneegrube in the Giant Mountains. He described the thallus as a thin, spreading crust that is grey but becomes progressively darker, and he remarked that when the thallus is wetted it lacks a violet-like smell.

Körber's diagnosis also stressed the comparatively large fruiting bodies, which he described as sessile and conical-to-hemispherical, with a small, blunt ostiole at the apex. He recorded colourless, spindle-shaped spores, with 6–8 spores per ascus and the spores divided into multiple compartments. In his accompanying notes, Körber separated the new species from what he considered its closest relative (S. koerberi) by its larger, more broadly attached fruiting bodies and by its more robust spores.

The species was reclassified in the genus Porina by Alexander Zahlbruckner in 1922, and to Pseudosagedia by Josef Hafellner and Klaus Kalb in 1995.

The German common name for the lichen is Große Kernflechte ('large core lichen').

== Description ==
Pseudosagedia grandis forms a thin to moderately developed crust on the substrate. It is typically olive-greenish, but may also be pale ash-grey to blackish; some thalli show purplish or reddish tones. The photobiont is a green alga in the genus Trentepohlia, which often gives the thallus a slightly greenish cast.

The fruiting bodies are perithecia (flask-shaped structures embedded in the thallus). They are semi-immersed, with at least their basal parts covered by a thallus mantle, while the apex remains exposed. Perithecia are relatively large, about 500–800 micrometres (μm) in diameter. The involucrellum (a protective outer covering) is darkly pigmented, black to purple-violet, and is often most strongly coloured in the lower parts. The exciple (the wall of the perithecium) is colourless to straw-coloured. Asci measure about 100–250 μm long. Ascospores are 5–7-septate and measure 25–50 × 6–10 μm. Asexual reproductive structures (pycnidia) are uncommon, at least in Central European material. When present, they are black and produce microconidia measuring about 4.5 × 0.7–1.0 μm.

== Habitat and distribution ==
Pseudosagedia grandis grows on stable siliceous boulders in the splash-water zone of shaded streams and watercourses. The species is rare and restricted to high mountain ranges, with records from the Black Forest in Germany and the Giant Mountains (which span Poland and the Czech Republic). It occurs in habitats subject to regular water spray or misting, typically in areas with high humidity and limited direct sunlight.
