= Myeloconis erumpens =

Scientific classification
- Kingdom: Fungi
- Division: Ascomycota
- Class: Lecanoromycetes
- Order: Gyalectales
- Family: Porinaceae
- Genus: Myeloconis
- Species: M. erumpens

Binomial name
- Myeloconis erumpens P.M.McCarthy & Elix (1996)

Species of lichen

Myeloconis erumpens is a species of corticolous (bark-dwelling), crustose lichen in the family Porinaceae. It is found in Papua New Guinea, north-eastern Australia and New Caledonia. The lichen was formally described as a new species in 1996 by Patrick M. McCarthy and John Elix. The species epithet erumpens refers to the distinctive thallus of the lichen, which has exposed patches and "eruptions" of yellow medulla that are visible against the brownish thallus.
