= Clathroporina wainiana =

Scientific classification
- Domain: Eukaryota
- Kingdom: Fungi
- Division: Ascomycota
- Class: Lecanoromycetes
- Order: Gyalectales
- Family: Porinaceae
- Genus: Clathroporina
- Species: C. wainiana

Binomial name
- Clathroporina wainiana Zahlbr. (1902)

Species of lichen

Clathroporina wainiana is a species of crustose lichen in the family Porinaceae. It was formally described as a new species in 1902 by German lichenologist Alexander Zahlbruckner. The type was collected by Franz Xaver Rudolf von Höhnel in the Rio de Janeiro Botanical Garden. The species epithet honours Finnish lichenologist Edvard August Vainio.

== Description ==
Clathroporina wainiana has a greenish-brown thallus with coarse warty protuberances, and pseudostromata–stroma in which fungal cells and remnants of host tissue are mixed. Each of these structures has a single black-walled pseudothecium. The asci produce two colourless ascospores, each measuring 150–220 by 40–55 μm.
