= Myeloconis fecunda =

Scientific classification
- Kingdom: Fungi
- Division: Ascomycota
- Class: Lecanoromycetes
- Order: Gyalectales
- Family: Porinaceae
- Genus: Myeloconis
- Species: M. fecunda

Binomial name
- Myeloconis fecunda P.M.McCarthy & Elix (1996)

Species of lichen

Myeloconis fecunda is a species of corticolous (bark-dwelling), crustose lichen in the family Porinaceae. Found in Malaysia and the Guianas, it was formally described as a new species in 1996 by Patrick M. McCarthy and John Elix. They used the species epithet fecunda because it is "the most abundantly and consistently fertile of the species".

The species is identified by its unique thallus chemistry, which is relatively uncomplicated (containing only myeloconone B as a major compound), as well as its elongated ascospores (ranging from 188 to 300 μm) and comparatively inconspicuous large ascomata in comparison to other related species.
