= Flabelloporina =

Scientific classification
- Domain: Eukaryota
- Kingdom: Fungi
- Division: Ascomycota
- Class: Lecanoromycetes
- Order: Gyalectales
- Family: Porinaceae
- Genus: Flabelloporina; Sobreira, M.Cáceres & Lücking (2018)
- Species: F. squamulifera

Binomial name
- Flabelloporina squamulifera (Breuss, Lücking & E.Navarro) Sobreira, M.Cáceres & Lücking (2018)

Synonyms
- Porina squamulifera Breuss, Lücking & E.Navarro (2013)

Genus of lichens

Flabelloporina is a fungal genus in the family Porinaceae. It consists of a single species, Flabelloporina squamulifera, which grows on tree bark in tropical rainforests. The lichen was first discovered in Costa Rica in 2013 and later found in Brazil, suggesting it may be more widespread in South and Central American wet forests. Flabelloporina is distinguished by its unique thallus (lichen body) structure, which produces numerous small, fan-shaped outgrowths called squamules. These structures, along with its black fruiting bodies and internal features, set it apart from related lichens. Originally classified in the genus Porina, genetic analysis in 2018 revealed it to be distinct, leading to the creation of the new genus Flabelloporina. The lichen typically inhabits the lower levels of humid forests, where it can sometimes extensively cover individual tree trunks.

== Taxonomy ==
The species Porina squamulifera was originally scientifically described in 2013 by the lichenologists Othmar Breuss, Robert Lücking, and Enia Navarro. The type specimen was collected by Navarro in 2002 from the Pacific La Amistad Conservation Area in Puntarenas Province. Although placed in the genus Porina, the authors noted that the thallus morphology was "hitherto unknown within the family, since only species with cylindrical or disc-shaped isidia have been described".

Genus Flabelloporina was proposed in 2018 by Priscylla Sobreira, Marcela Cáceres, and Lücking to accommodate the species. Molecular phylogenetic analysis of the mitochondrial small subunit (mtSSU) ribosomal DNA revealed that F. squamulifera forms a distinct lineage separate from other genera with black, exposed perithecia (fruiting bodies) such as Pseudosagedia and Trichothelium.

The genus name Flabelloporina refers to the distinctive flabelliform (fan-shaped) squamules produced on the thallus surface, which distinguish it morphologically from all other genera in Porinaceae. Other diagnostic features include the black, exposed perithecia lacking a thalline cover, and transversely septate ascospores. Flabelloporina falls within one of two major clades recovered in phylogenetic analyses of Porinaceae, specifically the clade containing taxa with perithecia covered by thallus tissue (with some exceptions).

Originally discovered in Costa Rica, F. squamulifera was subsequently found in Brazil, suggesting it may be more widespread in Neotropical wet forests. The genus represents one of approximately 15 genus-level lineages identified within Porinaceae based on molecular data. This higher-level classification correlates well with morphological traits and substrate ecology across the family, which contains over 300 species. Further sampling may reveal additional diversity within Flabelloporina as more tropical forest habitats are surveyed for crustose lichens.

== Description ==
Flabelloporina primarily grows on tree bark (corticolous) but can also occasionally be found on rocks (saxicolous). The thallus forms a smooth, thin layer that can be up to 5 cm wide. It ranges in colour from greyish-green to yellowish or olive-green and has a shiny surface. The edges of the thallus are bordered by a dark violet to black prothallus, which is a distinct outline that extends beneath the thallus as a hypothallus—a thin, black layer visible around the edges, about 0.5–1 mm wide. The thallus itself is 60–80 μm thick, with a thin, colourless outer layer (upper cortex) composed of tightly packed fungal filaments (hyphae). Below this is a layer containing green algae (photobiont) from the genus Trentepohlia, which provides the lichen with energy through photosynthesis. One of the key features of Flabelloporina is its production of phyllidia—small, leaf-like structures that aid in reproduction. These phyllidia are semi-circular to fan-shaped, thin, and delicate, often forming in clusters on the surface of the thallus. They are 0.3–1.0 mm wide and 0.2–0.6 mm long, although larger phyllidia up to 3 mm wide and 2 mm long can develop. The phyllidia have smooth or slightly notched (crenulate) edges, become branched with age, and are easily detached from the thallus, allowing the lichen to spread.

The reproductive structures of Flabelloporina include perithecia, which are small, round fruiting bodies that produce spores. These are dark brown to black, measuring 0.25–0.35 mm in diameter, and can sometimes contain multiple spore chambers. The wall of the perithecia contains a distinctive violet pigment called Pseudosagedia-violet. The spores are contained in sac-like structures (asci), which are 80–100 μm long and spindle-shaped (fusiform). Each ascus holds eight spores, which are oblong and divided into three compartments (3-septate), measuring 15–20 μm long and 3–4 μm wide. The spores are colourless and translucent (hyaline). No lichen products were detected through thin-layer chromatography, except for the violet pigment found in the perithecial walls. The genus does not produce pycnidia (asexual reproductive structures).

== Habitat and distribution ==
Flabelloporina squamulifera is a corticolous (bark-dwelling) lichen species found in tropical rainforest environments. It was originally discovered in Costa Rica, specifically in the Pacific La Amistad Conservation Area, Las Tablas Protected Zone, at an elevation of 1,600–1,700 m (5,200–5,600 ft) above sea level.

Its known range was significantly expanded when it was later found in Brazil, in the Atlantic rainforest remnant of Estação Biológica Santa Lúcia, Santa Teresa, Espírito Santo state. This Brazilian location is at a lower elevation of about 650 m (2,130 ft) above sea level. The considerable distance between these two sites suggests that F. squamulifera may have a broader distribution across Neotropical wet forests than initially thought.

In its Brazilian habitat, F. squamulifera was observed to have a notable growth pattern. It was found covering almost the entire surface of a single tree trunk, demonstrating its ability to colonise extensively under favourable conditions. It was not detected on any other trees in the immediate vicinity, indicating potential specificity in its substrate preferences or microhabitat requirements. The species typically inhabits the understory of humid tropical rainforests, where it likely benefits from the stable, moist conditions provided by the forest canopy.
