= Trichothelium confusum =

Scientific classification
- Domain: Eukaryota
- Kingdom: Fungi
- Division: Ascomycota
- Class: Lecanoromycetes
- Order: Gyalectales
- Family: Porinaceae
- Genus: Trichothelium
- Species: T. confusum

Binomial name
- Trichothelium confusum Lücking (2006)

Species of lichen

Trichothelium confusum is a species of foliicolous (leaf-dwelling) lichen in the family Porinaceae. Found in French Guiana, it was formally described as a new species in 2006 by lichenologist Robert Lücking.
