= Myeloconis guyanensis =

Scientific classification
- Kingdom: Fungi
- Division: Ascomycota
- Class: Lecanoromycetes
- Order: Gyalectales
- Family: Porinaceae
- Genus: Myeloconis
- Species: M. guyanensis

Binomial name
- Myeloconis guyanensis P.M.McCarthy & Elix (1996)

Species of lichen

Myeloconis guyanensis is a species of corticolous (bark-dwelling), crustose lichen in the family Porinaceae. Found in the coastal lowlands of eastern Guyana, it was formally described as a new species in 1996 by Patrick M. McCarthy and John Elix. Characteristics of the lichen include the prominent verrucae on the perithecia, its yellow, erumpent medulla, and the variety of lichen products found in the medulla.
