= Saxiloba pruinosa =

Scientific classification
- Kingdom: Fungi
- Division: Ascomycota
- Class: Lecanoromycetes
- Order: Gyalectales
- Family: Porinaceae
- Genus: Saxiloba
- Species: S. pruinosa

Binomial name
- Saxiloba pruinosa Aptroot (2022)

Species of lichen-forming fungus

Saxiloba pruinosa is a saxicolous (rock-dwelling) crustose lichen in the family Porinaceae. It is a small lichen that forms white to gray patches with a distinctive frosted appearance on granite boulders in primary rainforest in central Brazil. The species is highly distinctive for its unusual labyrinth-like pattern of non-frosted lines running across the frosted thallus surface, a combination of features not previously documented in any other lichen genus. It was formally described in 2022 from sterile material collected in the Reserva Cristalino region of Mato Grosso and remains known only from Brazil.

== Taxonomy ==
Saxiloba pruinosa was described in 2022 by André Aptroot from material collected on granite outcrops in primary rain forest in the Reserva Cristalino, Mato Grosso, Brazil, at 250–350 m (820–1,150 ft) elevation. The holotype (A. Aptroot 84284) is deposited in the herbarium of the Federal University of Mato Grosso do Sul (CGMS). The species was characterized as a member of Saxiloba with a pruinose (frosted), labyrinth-like thallus pattern, a combination not reported from any other lichen genus. Although the material is sterile (no fruiting bodies were seen), its placodioid thallus with a labyrinth-like pattern supports placement in Saxiloba. In overall form, it was considered closer to the Hawaiian species of the genus than to the Cuban species described earlier.

== Description ==
The thallus of Saxiloba pruinosa is placodioid (crust-like with a radiating margin) but lacks well-defined lobes or scalloped edge crenations. It is continuous and corticate (with a distinct outer layer), 2–4 mm across and about 0.2 mm thick. The thallus is dull, whitish grey, and densely pruinose (frosted). Its surface is broken by elongated, non-pruinose spots about 0.05 mm wide that form a labyrinth-like pattern, and it is not surrounded by a prothallus. The photobiont (algal partner) is trentepohlioid (Trentepohlia-type). Sexual fruiting bodies (ascomata) and asexual spore-producing structures (pycnidia) have not been observed, so the species is known only from sterile thallus material. All standard spot tests were negative (UV−, C−, K−, KC− and P−). Thin-layer chromatography did not detect any secondary metabolites (lichen substances).

== Habitat and distribution ==
Saxiloba pruinosa grows on partly-exposed granite boulders in primary (old-growth) rainforest in the Reserva Cristalino region of Mato Grosso, Brazil, at elevations between about 250 and 350 m (820 and 1,150 ft). When it was described in 2022, it had not been reported from outside Brazil. No further occurrences had been reported by 2025.
