= Segestria =

Segestria may refer to:

- Segestria (spider), a genus of spiders in the family Segestriidae
- Segestria (fungus), a genus of lichenized fungi in the family Porinaceae
