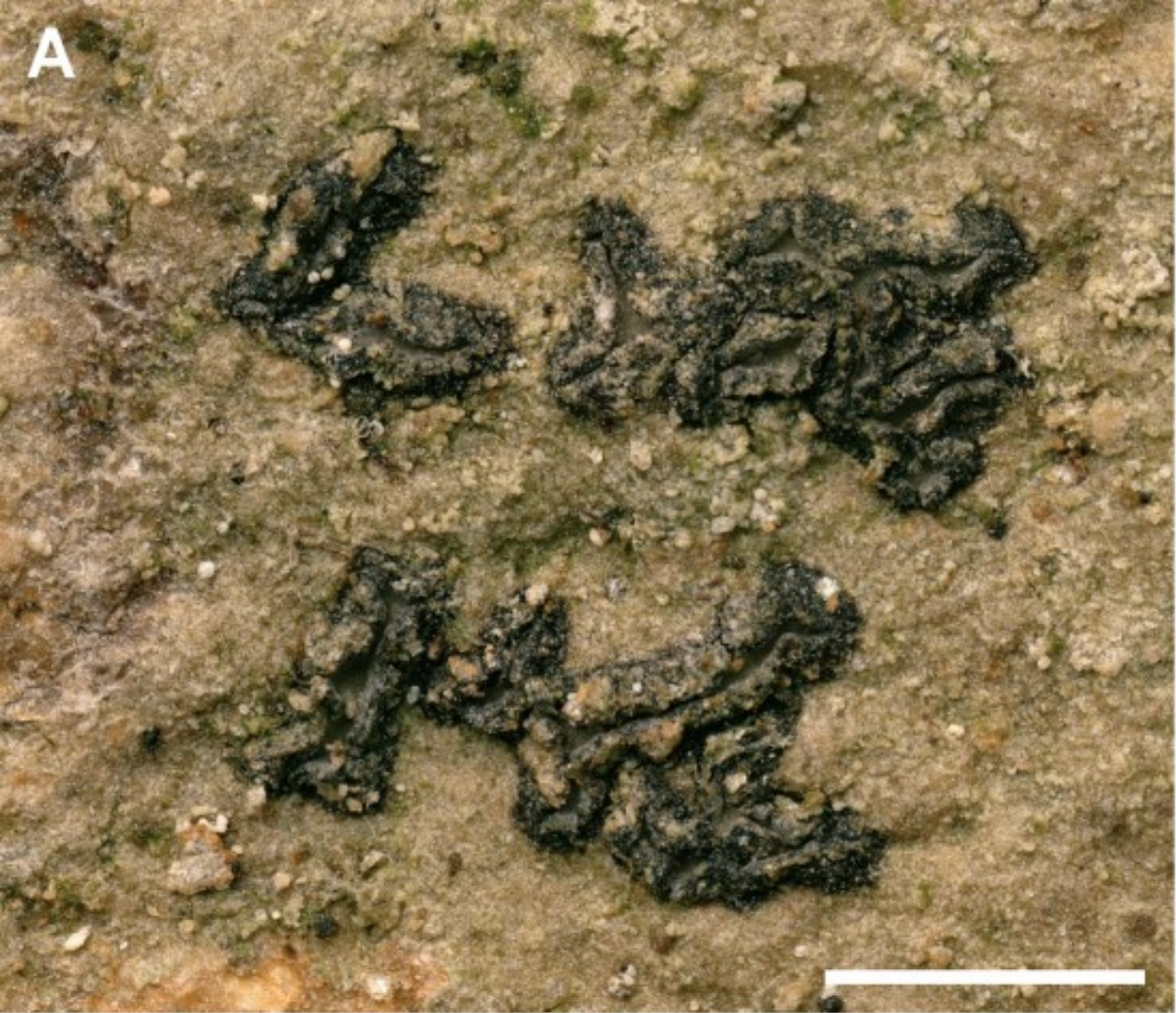
- Thallus and lirellae (fruiting bodies); scale bar = 1 mm

Scientific classification
- Kingdom: Fungi
- Division: Ascomycota
- Class: Lecanoromycetes
- Order: Ostropales
- Family: Sagiolechiaceae
- Genus: Sagiolechia
- Species: S. monoseptata

Binomial name
- Sagiolechia monoseptata Ertz & Tønsberg (2021)
- Holotype: Trolldalen, Norway

= Sagiolechia monoseptata =

Species of lichen

Sagiolechia monoseptata is a species of saxiolous (rock-dwelling), crustose lichen in the family Sagiolechiaceae. It occurs in northern Norway.

== Taxonomy ==
Sagiolechia monoseptata was first identified and formally described by the lichenologists Damien Ertz and Tor Tønsberg in 2021. The species is named for its distinctive spores, which are divided by a single septum (monoseptate). It was collected in Norway and belongs to the genus Sagiolechia, which is part of the larger family of lichens Sagiolechiaceae within the order Ostropales.

== Description ==
Sagiolechia monoseptata has a thin, pale greyish-green thallus (the main body of the lichen), which is smooth or slightly granular in texture. The thallus lacks a prothallus, a structure found in some lichens that forms a border around the main body. Its photobiont, the photosynthetic partner, belongs to the genus Trentepohlia, though no distinct orange bodies (a typical feature of this photobiont) were observed in fresh samples. The photobiont cells form short chains, appearing round to oblong.

The species produces black, elongated fruiting bodies (ascomata), which are initially cup-shaped but later develop into slit-like structures (lirellae) with lobed edges resembling small black teeth. These ascomata can measure between 0.5 and 2 mm in length and often branch, sometimes forming clusters up to 2 mm in diameter. The interior surface (hymenial disc) is white and mostly covered by the black outer layer (excipulum), which has a somewhat uneven texture.

The asci (spore-producing cells) are cylindrical to club-shaped, each producing eight spores. These spores are translucent (hyaline), ellipsoid in shape, and divided by a single wall (monoseptate). They measure between 12 and 16 μm in length and 5 to 6 μm in width. No secondary metabolites were detected in the species through typical lichen chemical spot tests (C−, K−, PD−, UV−), and no asexual reproductive structures (pycnidia have been observed in this species.

== Habitat and distribution ==
At the time of its original publication, Sagiolechia monoseptata was known to occur only from its type locality in northern Norway, specifically in the Nordland region. It was discovered growing on the shaded, horizontal surface of a siliceous rock under a boulder in a small, steep scree facing north. The scree overlooks an intermediate fen and supports a variety of lichen species, including Lepraria incana and an unidentified crustose lichen. Nearby plants included small birch trees (Betula pubescens) and spruce Picea abies), while other lichens in the vicinity included Gyalecta friesii and Psilolechia clavulifera.

This species appears to be restricted to a cold, boreal environment and may only occur in similar shaded, rocky habitats in the Northern Hemisphere, although further research is needed to determine its full range.
