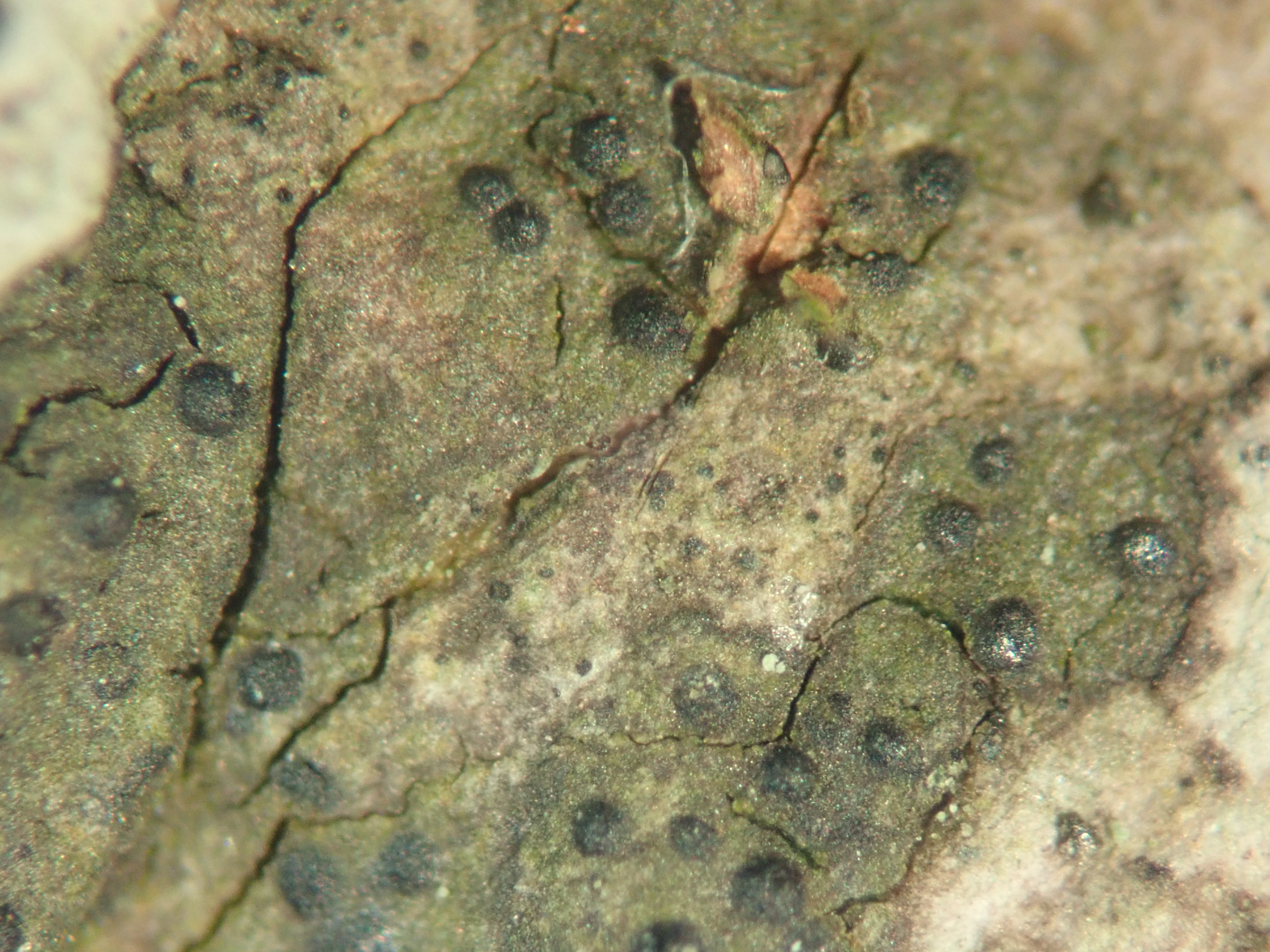

Conservation status
- Apparently Secure (NatureServe)

Scientific classification
- Domain: Eukaryota
- Kingdom: Fungi
- Division: Ascomycota
- Class: Lecanoromycetes
- Order: Gyalectales
- Family: Porinaceae
- Genus: Pseudosagedia
- Species: P. aenea

Binomial name
- Pseudosagedia aenea (Körb.) Hafellner & Kalb (1995)

Synonyms
- List: Spermatodium aeneum (Körb.) Trevis. (1860); Pyrenula aenea (Körb.) Rabenh. (1870); Sagedia chlorotica f. aenea (Körb.) Stein (1879); Segestria aenea (Körb.) Hellb. (1887); Porina aenea (Körb.) Zahlbr. (1922); Trichothelium aeneum (Körb.) R.C.Harris (1995); Verrucaria aenea Wallr. (1831); Sagedia aenea Körb. (1855); Verrucaria codonoidea Leight. (1851); Spermatodium codonoideum (Leight.) Trevis. (1860); Sagedia codonoidea (Leight.) Arnold (1861); Arthopyrenia macularis var. codonoidea (Leight.) Mudd (1861); Verrucaria chlorotica var. codonoidea (Leight.) Leight. (1871); Verrucaria chlorotica f. codonoidea (Leight.) Leight. (1875); Sagedia chlorotica f. codonoidea (Leight.) Arnold (1885); Porina chlorotica var. codonoidea (Leight.) Zahlbr. (1922)

= Pseudosagedia aenea =

Species of lichen

Pseudosagedia aenea is a widespread species of corticolous (bark-dwelling) crustose lichen in the family Porinaceae.

== Taxonomy ==
Pseudosagedia aenea was first described as Verrucaria aenea by Gustav Wilhelm Körber in 1855. It has been shuffled to several different genera in its taxonomic history, including Porina, Pyrenula, Sagedia, and Trichothelium. In 1995, the lichenologists Josef Hafellner and Klaus Kalb transferred it to the genus Pseudosagedia, establishing its current name Pseudosagedia aenea. The species epithet aenea comes from Latin and refers to the bronze-like appearance of the lichen.

The genus Pseudosagedia is characterised by dark purplish pigments (called Pseudosagedia-violet) in the inner wall of its fruiting bodies. This pigmentation pattern helps distinguish it from related genera in the family.
