= Gallaicolichen =

Scientific classification
- Kingdom: Fungi
- Division: Ascomycota
- Class: Lecanoromycetes
- Order: Gyalectales
- Family: Porinaceae
- Genus: Gallaicolichen; Sérus. & Lücking (2007)
- Species: G. pacificus

Binomial name
- Gallaicolichen pacificus Serux. & Lücking (2007)

Single-species fungal genus

Gallaicolichen is a fungal genus that contains the single species Gallaicolichen pacificus, a foliicolous (leaf-dwelling) lichen. Originally discovered in Hawaii in 2007, G. pacificus has since been found in various locations across the Pacific, including Australia, New Caledonia, Vanuatu, the Philippines, and Japan. The lichen forms small, pale greenish-yellow to yellowish-grey patches on leaves, typically in mid-altitude forests and along forest edges. G. pacificus is notable for its unique reproductive structures called peltidiangia, which produce disc-shaped propagules (peltidia) for asexual reproduction. Initially, its taxonomic classification was uncertain, but recent discoveries of specimens with sexual reproductive structures (perithecia) have enabled scientists to confidently place it within the family Porinaceae.

== Taxonomy ==
The type specimen of Gallaicolichen pacificus was originally collected from Kolukola Park in Hamakua, Hawaii, where it was found growing on Syzygium cumini. The genus name honours the New Zealander botanist and lichenologist David Galloway. Both the genus and its species were proposed in 2007 by Emmanuël Sérusiaux and Robert Lücking.

Initially, the taxonomic placement of G. pacificus within the Ascomycota was uncertain due to the absence of ascomata and lack of molecular data. However, the discovery of fertile specimens in New Caledonia, producing both peltidiangia and perithecia, along with molecular analysis using the mitochondrial small subunit ribosomal RNA (mtSSU) marker, has confirmed its placement within the family Porinaceae. Phylogenetic analysis reveals that G. pacificus is closely related to Porina guianensis.

== Description ==
Gallaicolichen pacificus is characterised by its leaf-dwelling, epiphyllous thallus, which appears as pale greenish yellow to pale yellowish grey rounded patches, ranging from 0.5 to 1.7 mm in diameter. The edges of these patches are slightly lobed, and the surface is typically smooth and somewhat shiny, becoming more intricate when examined closely. The thallus is relatively thin, measuring up to 20 μm, and comprises an interlaced network of fungal filaments (hyphae) and large, organized algal cells that form the lichen's photosynthetic component, known as the photobiont. Within the mature regions of the thallus, sizeable oxalate crystals are found, which diminish in number towards the edges.

Occasionally, a layer known as the cortex is present, which may or may not be fully developed, made of a single layer of blocky or multi-sided cells that sometimes have a slightly brownish tinge. Surrounding the thallus is the prothallus, a typically colourless, algae-free membranous layer that may sometimes appear bluish or brownish. The photobiont of this species is a type of alga from the genus Phycopeltis, belonging to the family Trentepohliaceae. The algal cells are greenish-brown, measuring roughly 8 to 11 by 4 to 5 μm, and are neatly arranged in radial rows forming plates.

Structures reminiscent of goniocystangia, termed peltidiangia by the authors, are consistently present, with each thallus patch containing 1 to 8 of these structures. These peltidiangia begin to develop at the centre of the patch and are almost perfectly circular, featuring a relatively thick, upright margin that is white and composed of raised hyphae that are not fused together. This margin is typically enveloped by the thallus.

The reproductive propagules of Gallaicolichen pacificus, referred to as peltidia, are numerous and fill the cavity of the peltidiangia. These propagules are disc-shaped, around 25 to 55 μm in diameter and 10 to 15 μm thick, with a regular arrangement. They consist of branching cells from the photobiont Phycopeltis, which are linked to a central, root-like structure and curled inward on the other side, surrounding a small, orderly layer of fungal cells. Typically, one to two ends of fungal filaments are found between the branches of the algal cells and are visibly apparent on the outer surface of the propagules. The ends of the algal branches are slightly enlarged and have a shiny appearance.

Perithecia, which are fruiting bodies used for spore production, were previously unknown in this species but have now been observed in some specimens. They are solitary and scattered, shaped like half-spheres to almost complete spheres, measuring 0.2–0.3 mm across and 0.1–0.2 mm high. Their surface is smooth (glabrous), with a flat top. The ostiole—a small opening through which spores are released—is located at the top but is difficult to see, marked by a pale orange area around it. The perithecia are coated with a layer of yellowish crystals made of calcium oxalate, 30–45 μm thick. On top of that is a thin 15–20 μm layer of tissue containing algae (algiferous tissue), which helps with photosynthesis. The involucrellum (a protective outer layer) is fused with the excipulum (the wall of the fruiting body), and both are densely covered with smaller crystals measuring 10–15 μm thick.

The hamathecium refers to sterile filaments that support the developing spores. In this case, the hamathecium is colourless (hyaline) and lacks any scattered granules (non-inspersed). It consists of simple, unbranched filaments (paraphyses), which are 1–1.5 μm wide. The asci, which are sac-like structures that contain the spores, are narrow and shaped like a slightly clubbed cylinder (obclavate). These asci do not react to iodine stains (I−) and measure about 92.5 by 12 μm. The top of the ascus is slightly flat, with a small ring structure. Each ascus holds eight spores, which are spindle-shaped (fusiform), divided into 6–7 compartments (septate), and measure 24.5–28 μm in length and 4–5.5 μm in width. The spores are 4–7 times as long as they are wide, colourless, and are surrounded by a gelatinous sheath that is about 3.5 μm thick.

Specimens can have both peltidiangia and perithecia, although this is uncommon. When perithecia are present, peltidiangia are typically reduced.

== Habitat and distribution ==
In addition to the type locality in Hawaii, Gallaicolichen pacificus has been recorded from Queensland, Australia, New Caledonia, Vanuatu, the Philippines, and Japan (Ryukyu Islands).

In New Caledonia, G. pacificus has been observed in several locations in the South and North Provinces of Grande Terre. It is found in high numbers on phorophytes in forests at mid-altitude (150–600 m elevation), as well as along forest edges and in riparian habitats. The majority of specimens exhibit only peltidiangia without ascomata, with the occurrence of both perithecial ascomata and peltidiangia on the same thallus being uncommon.
