= Myeloconis =

Scientific classification
- Kingdom: Fungi
- Division: Ascomycota
- Class: Lecanoromycetes
- Order: Gyalectales
- Family: Porinaceae
- Genus: Myeloconis; P.M.McCarthy & Elix (1996)

Type species
- Myeloconis fecunda P.M.McCarthy & Elix (1996)

Species
- M. erumpens M. fecunda M. guyanensis M. parva

Genus of lichens

Myeloconis is a genus of corticolous (bark-dwelling), crustose lichens in the family Porinaceae. It has four species. The genus was circumscribed in 1996 by Patrick M. McCarthy and John Elix, with M. fecunda assigned as the type species. The genus name, derived from the Greek myelos ("marrow", or "pith") and konis ("dust"), refers to the powdery yellow-orange pigments in the medulla.

== Description ==
Genus Myeloconis is characterised by several unique features. These include a medulla that contains yellow or orange pigments that have not been seen in other lichen species before. The fruiting bodies of Myeloconis, known as perithecioid ascomata, have a dark, dense, and almost pseudostromatal wall. The hamathecium, which is the part of the ascoma that supports the spores, is free and anastomoses at the base. The asci are uniformly thin-walled, and the ascospores are elongate and muriform.

Although the exact relationship of Myeloconis to other lichen genera is not certain, the characteristics of the fruiting bodies and their contents suggest that Myeloconis may be closely related to the genera Porina and Clathroporina in the family Porinaceae.

== Chemistry ==
The new phenalenone compound, myeloconone A2 (6,7,9-trihydroxy-3,8-dimethoxy-4-methyl-1H-phenalen-1-one), was isolated from Myeloconis erumpens. It is a deep yellow pigment. Leucomyeloconone and myelocoterpene are other lichen products found in the genus.

== Species ==
Myeloconis species occur in lowland tropical forest.

- Myeloconis erumpens P.M.McCarthy & Elix (1996) – Papua New Guinea
- Myeloconis fecunda P.M.McCarthy & Elix (1996) – Malaysia
- Myeloconis guyanensis P.M.McCarthy & Elix (1996) – Guyana
- Myeloconis parva P.M.McCarthy & Elix (1996) – Brazil
