= Trichothelium angustisporum =

Scientific classification
- Domain: Eukaryota
- Kingdom: Fungi
- Division: Ascomycota
- Class: Lecanoromycetes
- Order: Gyalectales
- Family: Porinaceae
- Genus: Trichothelium
- Species: T. angustisporum

Binomial name
- Trichothelium angustisporum M.Cáceres & Lücking (2004)

Species of lichen

Trichothelium angustisporum is a species of corticolous (bark-dwelling), crustose lichen in the family Porinaceae. It is found in subtropical regions of Guyana and the Atlantic Forest of Brazil. The lichen was formally described as a new species in 2004 by lichenologists Marcela Eugenia da Silva Cáceres and Robert Lücking. The species epithet refers to its narrow and elongated ascospores.

== Description ==
Trichothelium angustisporum has a continuous thallus that is pale greenish to yellowish-grey in colour, and can grow up to 5 cm (2 in) across. The photobiont is Trentepohlia (a genus of green algae), with cells forming short, irregular threads. Perithecia are more or less spherical and black, measuring 0.25 to 0.40 mm in diameter. The lichen is characterized by its numerous perithecial setae, which can be as short as 0.05 mm or as long as 0.15 mm, and are usually arranged in several layers around the ostiole. The asci of Trichothelium angustisporum are obclavate to fusiform in shape, with dimensions of 170–210 by 20–28 μm. Ascospores are narrowly fusiform to almost cylindrical, contains between 21 and 29 septa, colourless, and typically measure 100–170 by 5–7 μm. Pycnidia (structures bearing conidia) have not been observed in this species.

== Distribution ==
Trichothelium angustisporum has been found in subtropical parts of Guyana, and the Atlantic Forest of Brazil. It is closely related to and often confused with Trichothelium horridulum, as both species share similar perithecial morphology. However, differences in ascospore size and septation consistently distinguish T. angustisporum as a distinct taxon. Although T. angustisporum was initially thought to also occur in the southeastern United States (Florida and Louisiana), those populations were described as a distinct species, T. americanum, in 2016.
