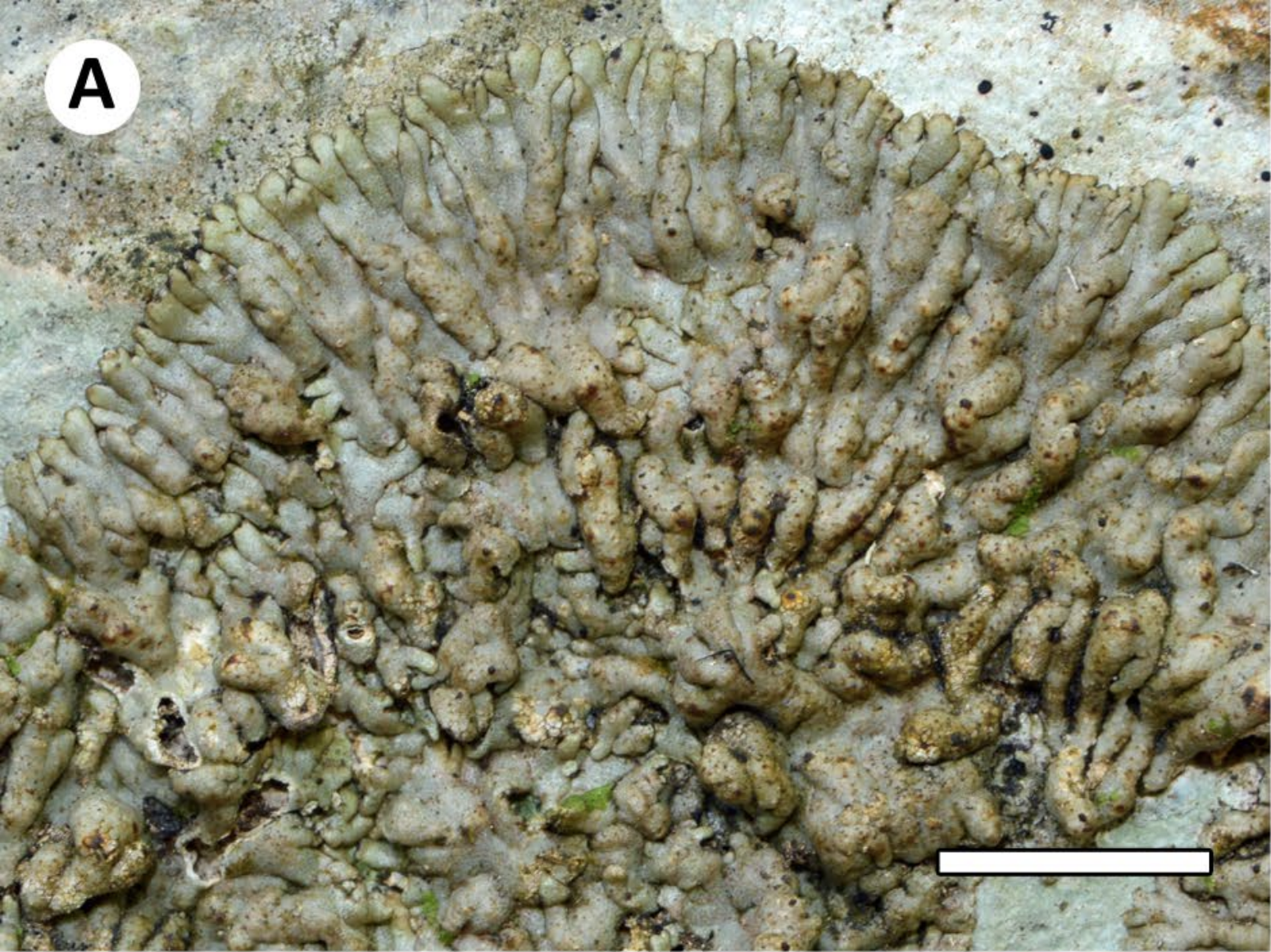

Scientific classification
- Domain: Eukaryota
- Kingdom: Fungi
- Division: Ascomycota
- Class: Lecanoromycetes
- Order: Gyalectales
- Family: Porinaceae
- Genus: Saxiloba
- Species: S. firmula

Binomial name
- Saxiloba firmula (Müll.Arg.) Lücking, Moncada & Sipman (2020)

Synonyms
- Porina firmula Müll.Arg. (1885); Verrucaria firmula (Müll.Arg.) Nyl. (1892)

= Saxiloba firmula =

Species of lichen

Saxiloba firmula is a species of placodioid saxicolous lichen in the family Porinaceae. This lichen is native to the Caribbean, where it grows on calcareous rocks in shaded or semi-exposed habitats. Known for its distinctive rosette-like thallus with surface patterns, S. firmula exemplifies the morphological and ecological adaptations characteristic of the genus Saxiloba, for which it is the type species.

== Taxonomy ==
Saxiloba firmula was originally described in 1872 by the Swiss lichenologist Johannes Müller Argoviensis as Porina firmula. In 2020, Robert Lücking, Bibiana Moncada, and Harrie Sipman transferred the species to the newly created genus Saxiloba based on its unique placodioid thallus morphology and molecular phylogenetics evidence. The genus was established to separate species with this morphology from other members of the family Porinaceae.

== Description ==
Saxiloba firmula has a flattened, leaf-like thallus that forms tightly appressed rosettes measuring 10–20 mm in diameter. The edges of the thallus feature distinct lobes, and its surface is marked by a network of fine, reticulate lines. These lines define chambers within the thallus that contain clusters of crystals, giving the lichen a textured appearance when wet. The colour of the thallus ranges from silvery grey-green to olive-grey.

The internal structure of S. firmula is complex, with a tightly packed fungal layer forming the upper cortex. Beneath this is the photobiont layer, which contains symbiotic green algae of the genus Trentepohlia. Embedded within the photobiont layer are large crystal clusters, thought to play a role in light management. A loosely arranged medulla of fungal hyphae underlies the photobiont layer, and a dark hypothallus anchors the lichen to its rocky substrate.

Reproductive structures include perithecia, which are immersed in the thallus and covered by a layer of fungal tissue. The reddish-brown to cherry-red ostioles (openings) of the perithecia are visible on the surface. The asci within produce small, colourless, multi-septate ascospores.

== Habitat and distribution ==
Saxiloba firmula is found in the Caribbean, including Cuba, Isla de la Juventud (formerly Isle of Pines), Puerto Rico, and the Bahamas. It primarily grows on calcareous rocks in dry forest habitats, favouring shaded or semi-shaded conditions. Despite its preference for shade, it can tolerate limited sun exposure, allowing it to inhabit a range of microhabitats.

The species' vertical arrangement of crystal clusters and algal cells within its thallus may enhance its ability to capture and utilise light in low-light environments. This adaptation likely contributes to its success in the often dim, shaded habitats it occupies.
