= Sagiolechia bairdensis =

Scientific classification
- Domain: Eukaryota
- Kingdom: Fungi
- Division: Ascomycota
- Class: Lecanoromycetes
- Order: Ostropales
- Family: Sagiolechiaceae
- Genus: Sagiolechia
- Species: S. bairdensis

Binomial name
- Sagiolechia bairdensis Fryday, 2021

Species of lichen

Sagiolechia bairdensis is a species of lichenized fungus found in southeastern Alaska. It grows on small rocks or pebbles. The lichen has a smooth grey thallus and appears in patches along the grains of the rocks. These patches are small, covering 2 mm X 1 mm spherical areas. Sagiolechia bairdensis differs from others in its genus with its small apothecia, non-trentepohliod photobiont, hyaline 3-septate ascospores and by occurring on siliceous rock.
