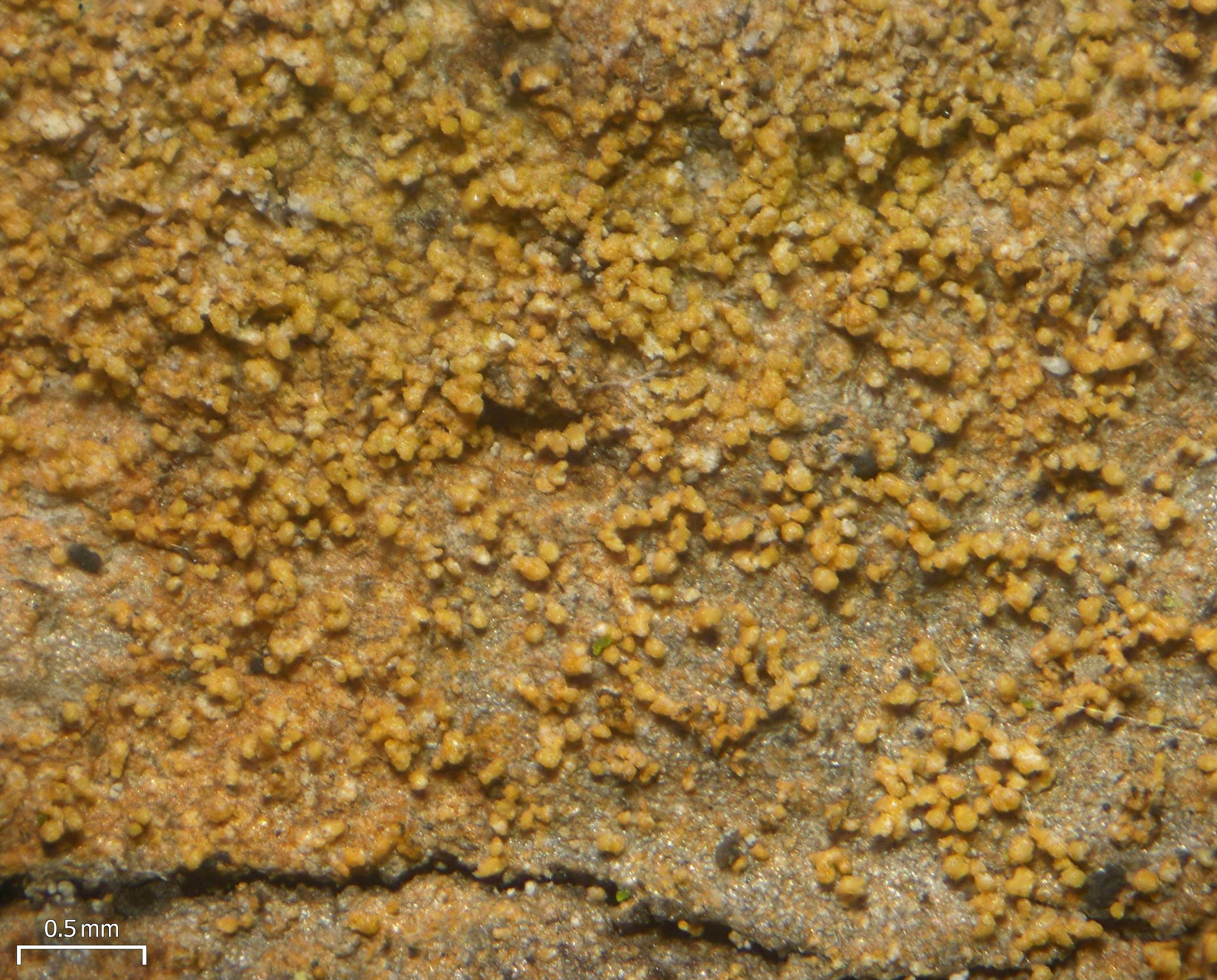

Scientific classification
- Kingdom: Fungi
- Division: Ascomycota
- Class: Lecanoromycetes
- Order: Gyalectales
- Family: Porinaceae
- Genus: Porina
- Species: P. scabrida

Binomial name
- Porina scabrida R.C.Harris (1995)
- Holotype: Columbia County, Florida

= Porina scabrida =

Species of lichen

Porina scabrida is a species of crustose lichen in the family Porinaceae. First described in 1995 by American lichenologist Richard C. Harris, it is characterized by its pale olive-tan crustose thallus with distinctive cylindrical isidia. The species is found in eastern North America, ranging from Ontario, Canada through the southeastern United States, where it grows primarily on tree bark in humid environments such as hardwood-cypress swamps and mesic forests. It can be found at various elevations from sea level up to 435 m (1,427 ft), typically in protected areas but occasionally in disturbed habitats. The species was distributed to major herbaria as part of the "Lichens of Eastern North America Exsiccati" collection.

== Taxonomy ==
The lichen was described as a new species in 1995 by the American lichenologist Richard C. Harris.

Porina scabrida was included in the tenth fascicle (specimen #458) of the Lichens of Eastern North America Exsiccati, a set of dried specimens distributed to several major herbaria.

== Description ==
Porina scabrida is a species of crustose lichen that forms a pale olive-tan coating (the thallus) on its substrate. The thallus surface is warty (verrucose) and ranges from dull to slightly shiny in appearance. A distinctive feature of this species is its usually abundant finger-like projections called isidia, which are cylindrical and sometimes branched. These isidia are somewhat irregular in shape and are composed of the lichen's algal partner (photobiont) wrapped in a thin protective layer of fungal cells.

The lichen's reproductive structures (ascomata) appear as small, flattened to dome-shaped warts that measure 0.5–0.7 mm in diameter. These warts often grow directly on the thallus surface and frequently bear the same cylindrical isidia found elsewhere on the lichen. Inside these structures, the fungal spores develop within elongated sacs called asci, which measure about 120 μm long by 17 μm wide and contain eight spores each. The spores themselves are spindle-shaped with pointed ends and divided into eight cells. They measure 35–47 μm in length (occasionally reaching 57 μm) and 5.5–8 μm in width. No microconidia (tiny asexual spores) have been observed in this species.

== Habitat and distribution ==
Porina scabrida is found in eastern North America, ranging from Ontario, Canada south through the southeastern United States, with a distribution spanning from the Southern Coastal Plain through the Piedmont to the Appalachian Mountains. The species has been documented across several states including Florida, Louisiana, South Carolina, and North Carolina. In Florida, it occurs from Leon County in the panhandle south to Putnam County in the peninsula. In North Carolina, it has been found in three distinct ecoregions: the Outer Banks (Tidewater), the Piedmont (Wake County), and the Blue Ridge (Great Smoky Mountains). In Canada, it is known from Thunder Bay District, Ontario, where it has been found in Sleeping Giant Provincial Park on the Sibley Peninsula.

The lichen typically grows in humid environments such as hardwood-cypress swamps and mesic hardwood forests, including mixed-wood forests dominated by balsam fir (Abies balsamea), northern white cedar (Thuja occidentalis), alder (Alnus), birch (Betula), and spruce (Picea). It has been found growing on various tree species, including tupelo (Nyssa), cypress (Taxodium), oak (Quercus), water hickory (Carya aquatica), red maple (Acer rubrum), white oak (Quercus alba), tulip tree (Liriodendron tulipifera), and northern white cedar (Thuja occidentalis), usually at relatively low elevations but reaching up to 435 m (1,427 ft) in Ontario. Most collections have been made in protected areas such as national forests, state parks, and wildlife management areas, though it can also occur in disturbed areas near infrastructure such as highway corridors.
