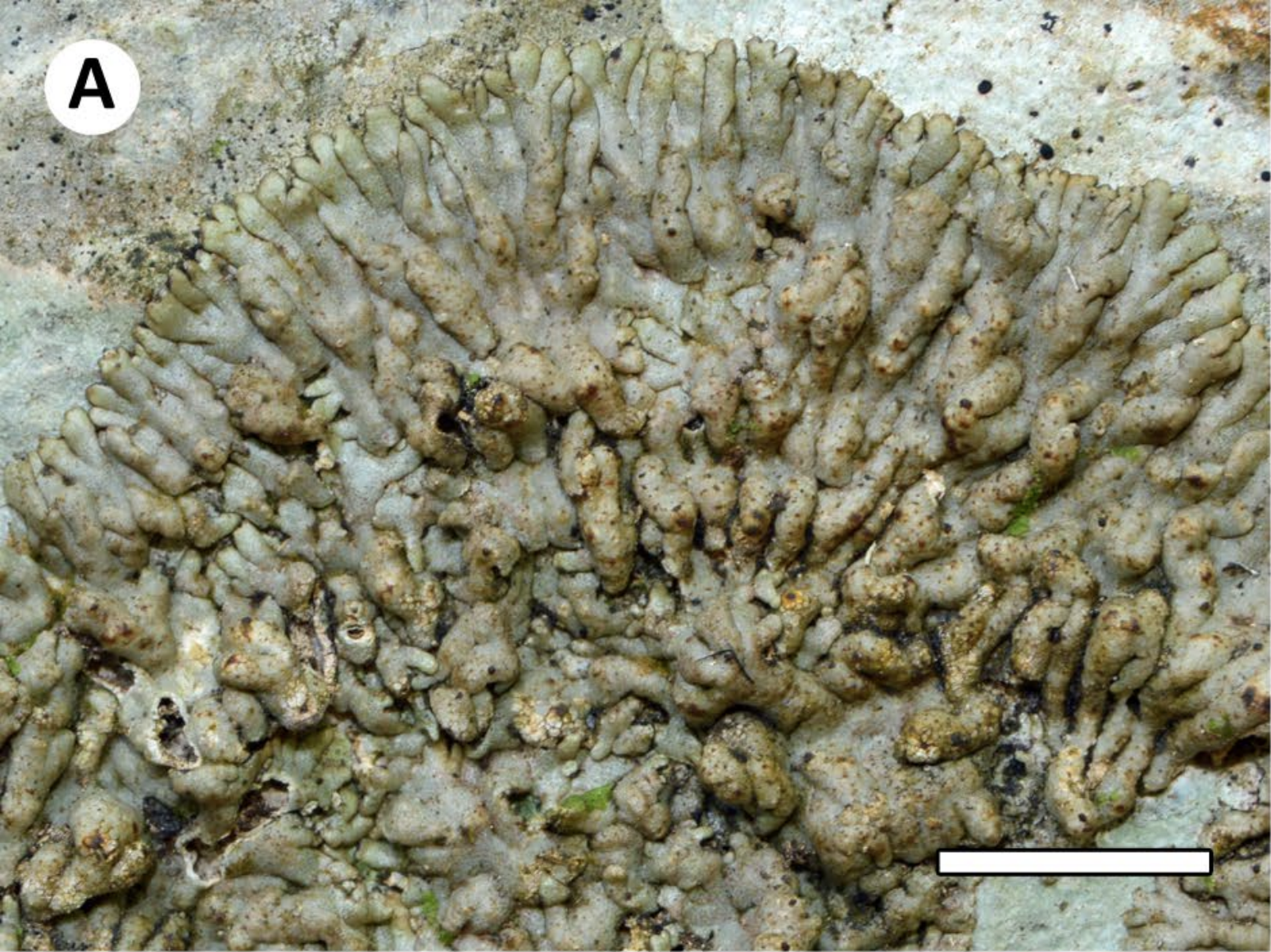
- Saxiloba firmula

Scientific classification
- Kingdom: Fungi
- Division: Ascomycota
- Class: Lecanoromycetes
- Order: Gyalectales
- Family: Porinaceae
- Genus: Saxiloba; Lücking, Moncada & Viñas (2020)

Type species
- Saxiloba firmula (Müll.Arg.) Lücking, Moncada & Sipman (2020)

Species
- S. firmula S. hawaiiensis S. pruinosa

= Saxiloba =

Genus of lichens

Saxiloba is a genus of lichen-forming fungi in the family Porinaceae. It comprises three species of saxicolous (rock-dwelling) placodioid lichens, known from disjunct locations in the Caribbean, Hawaii, and Brazil. The genus was circumscribed in 2020 to accommodate species with a distinctive placodioid thallus featuring unique surface patterns and internal crystal structures. Saxiloba lichens are characterised by their flattened, leaf-like thalli with marginal lobes, growing tightly appressed to rock surfaces. They have a complex internal structure, including large crystal clusters embedded within the photobiont layer, which may be an adaptation for light management in their typically shaded habitats.

== Taxonomy ==
Saxiloba was circumscribed in 2020 by Robert Lücking, Bibiana Moncada, and Carlos Viñas to accommodate two species previously placed in other genera. The genus is characterised by its unique placodioid thallus with distinct marginal lobes, growing on rock with a trentepohlioid photobiont. It has a distinctive fenestrate thallus anatomy with conspicuous surface lines.

Molecular phylogenetics analysis places Saxiloba within the family Porinaceae, but on a separate branch from other genera. Its position supports dividing Porinaceae into more genera than previously proposed. Saxiloba has a unique morphology and anatomy for Porinaceae, resembling some taxa in the related family Graphidaceae. In a later analysis, it was shown by part of a lineage with both rock-dwelling and bark-dwelling Porina species having crustose and non-lobate thalli; as Damien Ertz and Paul Diederich suggest, "this raises some doubts about the use of the ascospores and thallus type alone for defining genera in the Porinaceae."

== Description ==
Saxiloba lichens are characterised by their distinctive placodioid thallus, meaning the lichen body forms a flattened, leaf-like structure with lobes around the edges. These lichens grow tightly appressed to rock surfaces, forming rosettes up to 10–20 mm in diameter. The thallus surface appears smooth but features a unique network of reticulate (net-like) or meandering lines, which are most visible when the lichen is wet. These lines surround chambers that contain clusters of crystals. The overall colour of the thallus varies between species, ranging from silvery grey-green to olive-yellow or yellowish grey-green.

In cross-section, the thallus reveals a complex structure. The upper layer (cortex) is composed of tightly packed fungal hyphae. Beneath this lies the photobiont layer, containing the algal partner (Trentpohlia) of the lichen symbiosis. Large, triangular to rhomboid clusters of crystals are embedded within the photobiont layer, giving the surface its distinctive patterned appearance. A medulla of loosely woven fungal hyphae sits below the photobiont layer. The bottom of the thallus features a dark brown to black hypothallus, which attaches the lichen to its rocky substrate.

The reproductive structures (perithecia) of Saxiloba are typically immersed in the thallus and covered by a layer of thallus tissue. The ostiole (opening) of the perithecium appears as a small, reddish-brown to cherry-red spot on the surface. Inside the perithecia, asci produce small, hyaline (colourless and transparent) ascospores with 3–5 cross-walls (septa).

== Habitat and distribution ==
Saxiloba lichens are saxicolous, meaning they grow on rock surfaces. The genus has a disjunct distribution across tropical and subtropical regions, with species known from the Caribbean, Hawaii, and South America.

Saxiloba firmula, the type species, is found in the Caribbean, including Cuba, Isla de la Juventud (formerly Isle of Pines), Puerto Rico, and the Bahamas. It primarily grows on calcareous rocks in dry forests of western and central Cuba, typically inhabiting shaded microhabitats, although it can tolerate some sun exposure.

Saxiloba hawaiiensis is known only from its type locality on the island of Kauai in Hawaii. Unlike its Caribbean counterpart, this species grows on volcanic basalt. It was found in a disturbed forest habitat at an elevation of about 410 metres.

A third species, Saxiloba pruinosa, was described in 2022 from Brazil. This species grows on half-exposed granite boulders in primary rainforest in the state of Mato Grosso, at elevations between 250 and 350 metres. It is currently only known from its type locality in the Reserva Cristalino.

The vertical arrangement of crystal clusters and algal cells within the thallus of Saxiloba species has been interpreted as an adaptation to manage light in their respective habitats. This structure could help distribute light more evenly through a thicker photobiont layer, potentially allowing the lichens to accumulate more biomass in low-light conditions.
