= Sagiolechia phaeospora =

Scientific classification
- Kingdom: Fungi
- Division: Ascomycota
- Class: Lecanoromycetes
- Order: Ostropales
- Family: Sagiolechiaceae
- Genus: Sagiolechia
- Species: S. phaeospora

Binomial name
- Sagiolechia phaeospora Fryday & T.Sprib. (2020)

Species of lichen-forming fungus

Sagiolechia phaeospora is a species of crustose lichen in the family Sagiolechiaceae. It is found in the alpine tundra of Alaska.

== Taxonomy ==
The lichen was described as a new species in 2020 by the lichenologists Alan Fryday and Toby Spribille. The type specimen was collected from the Hoonah-Angoon Census Area in Glacier Bay National Park. It was found on Excursion Ridge at an elevation of 918 m (3,012 ft), where it was growing on argillite rock. The specific epithet phaeospora refers to its brownish ascospores, a feature that is unique in the genus Sagiolechia.

== Description ==
Sagiolechia phaeospora has a thin, whitish, crustose thallus with numerous cracks and areoles. The photobiont partner of the lichen is a single-celled green alga with roundish to angular cells measuring 10–14 μm. The other species in the genus, in contrast, have trentepohloid photobionts (i.e., filamentous, multicellular green algae with a yellow to orange color). The apothecia made by the lichen are black, measuring 0.6–1.0 mm in diameter. Asci are eight-spored, with dimensions of 70–72 by 16–17 μm. The brownish ascospores are more or less muriform (i.e., divided by horizontal and vertical septa), and typically measure 17.8–18.5 by 9.5–10.6 μm. Sagiolechia phaeospora is unreactive to standard chemical spot tests.

== Habitat and distribution ==
The lichen is known only from the type locality, where it is saxicolous on argillite rock in heath in alpine tundra.
