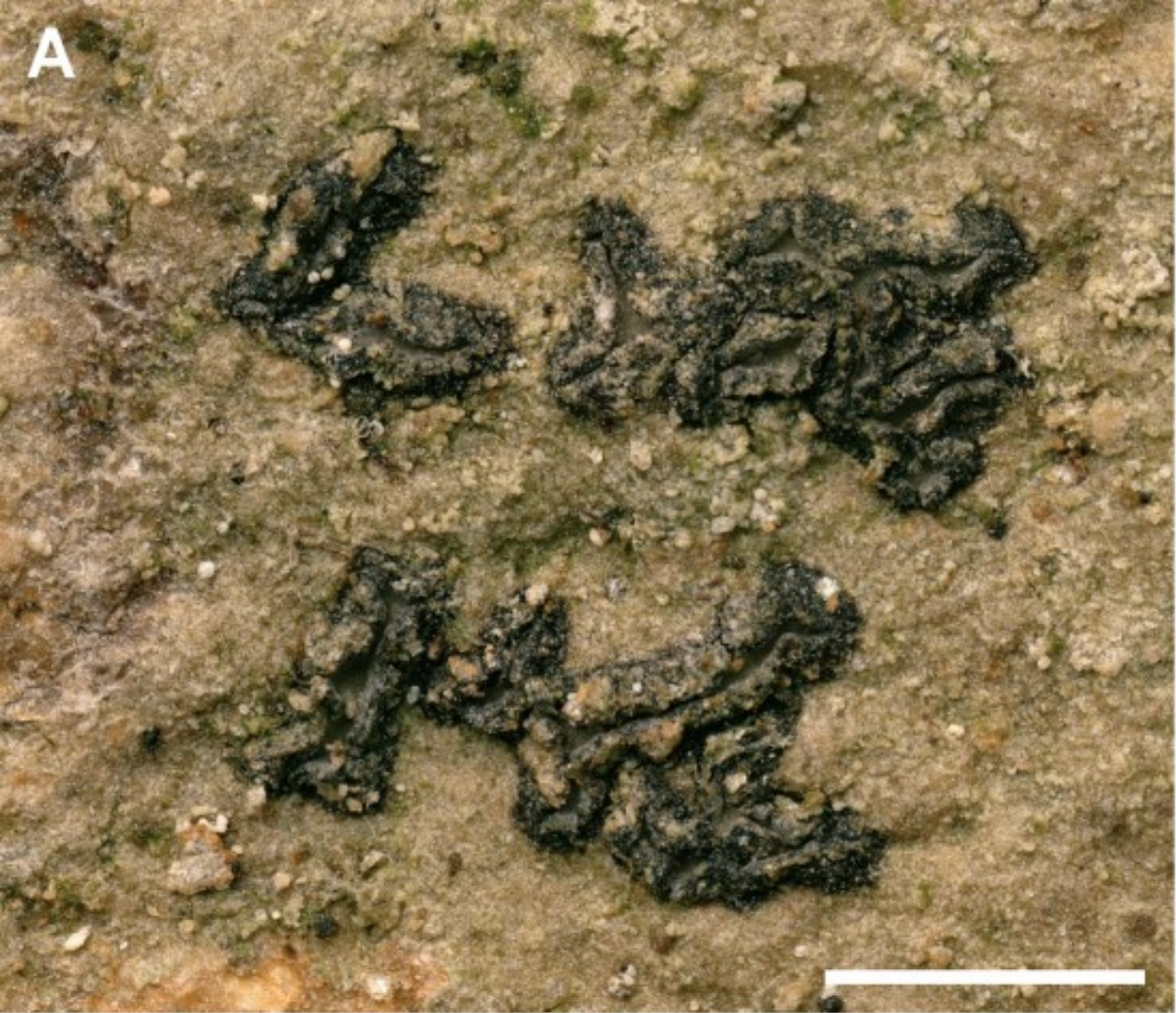
- Sagiolechia monoseptata

Scientific classification
- Kingdom: Fungi
- Division: Ascomycota
- Class: Lecanoromycetes
- Order: Ostropales
- Family: Sagiolechiaceae
- Genus: Sagiolechia; A.Massal. (1854)

Type species
- Sagiolechia protuberans (Ach.) A.Massal. (1854)

Species
- S. atlantica S. bairdensis S. monoseptata S. parasitica S. phaeospora S. protuberans

= Sagiolechia =

Genus of lichens

Sagiolechia is a genus of lichen-forming fungi in the family Sagiolechiaceae. These lichens form either extremely thin crusts within their substrate or live parasitically on other lichens without forming their own thallus. The genus is characterised by distinctive black, glossy fruiting bodies that begin embedded within the host material and later erupt to the surface, often developing elaborate folded or star-like forms. Sagiolechia contains six species found in diverse locations including Alaska, Greenland, Norway, and Madeira, with most species being quite rare and relatively recently discovered.

== Taxonomy ==
The genus was circumscribed by lichenologist Abramo Bartolommeo Massalongo in 1854, who assigned Sagiolechia protuberans as the type species. In his original description, Massalongo characterised Sagiolechia by its apothecia (fruiting bodies) that begin as dot-like structures completely enclosed within the thallus, later erupting to become prominent and assuming various forms—from urn-shaped to elaborately folded with star-like tears and a papillate (pimple-like) centre. He noted the distinctive charcoal-like and starchy exterior and described the presence of eight-spored asci with thick, oval paraphyses. Massalongo distinguished the genus by its consistently translucent (hyaline) spores that are tetrablastic or quadrilocular (four-celled), establishing the morphological foundation that would define Sagiolechia as a distinct genus. The family Sagiolechiaceae was proposed in 2010 to contain Sagiolechia as the type genus, and genus Rhexophiale; molecular phylogenetics analysis showed that these two genera formed a distinct clade in the Ostropales.

== Description ==
Sagiolechia forms either an extremely thin crust within its substrate or no thallus at all when it lives parasitically on other lichens. When present, the lichenised species partner with the filamentous green algal genus Trentepohlia, although one species hosts a spherical, chlorococcoid alga instead.

The sexual fruiting bodies are initially embedded apothecia that later become more or less sessile on the surface. They lack a rim of thallus tissue; instead, a prominent, glossy black exciple surrounds the disc. This exciple is tough and carbon-rich, appears smooth or distinctly scalloped, and in section shows a dark-brown outer zone that grades inward to colourless tissue. The exposed disc is likewise black and can be shallowly concave, evenly convex, raised into conical warts, or radially furrowed (gyrose). A dark-brown epithecium covers the hymenium but does not react with potassium hydroxide solution. The hymenium itself turns blue in iodine stains, whereas the subhymenial tissue ranges from colourless to dark brown.

Slender paraphyses thread the hymenium (the fertile, spore-bearing tissue); they are septate, may branch sparingly near the tips, and often fuse to one another, the upper one-to-three cells swelling slightly and becoming glued together by a dense matrix. Cylindric-clavate asci each contain eight ascospores (occasionally fewer if some abort); their walls stain blue in Lugol's iodine, but the apical dome remains iodine-negative. The resulting spores are ellipsoidal to spindle-shaped, divided by transverse septa or, in some species, by a muriform lattice of both transverse and longitudinal walls. Spores start colourless and may mature to pale brown; many are sheathed in a thin, transparent perispore.

Asexual reproduction occurs in immersed, flask-shaped pycnidia scattered through the thallus. These structures bear short, bottle-shaped conidiogenous cells that bud off rod-shaped, colourless conidia. No secondary metabolites (lichen products) have been detected in any Sagiolechia species using thin-layer chromatography.

== Species ==
As of July 2025, Species Fungorum (in the Catalogue of Life) accept five species of Sagiolechia.

- Sagiolechia atlantica Henssen (1995) – Madeira
- Sagiolechia bairdensis Fryday (2021) – Alaska
- Sagiolechia monoseptata Ertz & Tønsberg (2021) – Norway
- Sagiolechia parasitica Alstrup & E.S.Hansen (2001) – Greenland
- Sagiolechia phaeospora Fryday & T.Sprib. (2020) – Alaska
- Sagiolechia protuberans (Ach.) A.Massal. (1854)
