= Segestria (fungus) =

Scientific classification
- Domain: Eukaryota
- Kingdom: Fungi
- Division: Ascomycota
- Class: Lecanoromycetes
- Order: Gyalectales
- Family: Porinaceae
- Genus: Segestria; Fr. (1825)

Type species
- Segestria lectissima Fr. (1825)

Genus of fungi

Segestria is a genus of lichen-forming fungi in the family Porinaceae. It contains an estimated 70 species.
