= Clathroporina =

Scientific classification
- Domain: Eukaryota
- Kingdom: Fungi
- Division: Ascomycota
- Class: Lecanoromycetes
- Order: Gyalectales
- Family: Porinaceae
- Genus: Clathroporina; Müll.Arg. (1882)

Type species
- Clathroporina olivacea Müll.Arg. (1882)

Genus of fungi

Clathroporina is a genus of lichenized fungi in the family Porinaceae. It was circumscribed by Swiss lichenologist Johannes Müller Argoviensis in 1882.

== Species ==
- Clathroporina amygdalina (Müll.Arg.) Fink (1935)
- Clathroporina anoptella (Stirt.) Zahlbr. (1922)
- Clathroporina caudata Vězda & Vivant (1972)
- Clathroporina chlorocarpa Müll.Arg. (1891)
- Clathroporina chlorotica Müll.Arg. (1895)
- Clathroporina cinereonigricans (Vain.) Zahlbr. (1922)
- Clathroporina diphloea Zahlbr. (1935)
- Clathroporina dominicana Zahlbr. (1931)
- Clathroporina duplicascens (Nyl.) Zahlbr. (1922)
- Clathroporina elabens Müll.Arg. (1885)
- Clathroporina elliottii (Vain.) Zahlbr. (1922)
- Clathroporina endochrysea (C.Bab.) Müll. Arg. (1894)
- Clathroporina exiguella Zahlbr. (1935)
- Clathroporina foliicola Vězda (1977)
- Clathroporina fulva (Vain.) Zahlbr. (1922)
- Clathroporina haultainii (C.Knight) Müll. Arg. (1894)
- Clathroporina interrupta (Vain.) Zahlbr. (1922)
- Clathroporina irregularis Müll.Arg. (1888)
- Clathroporina isidiifera R.C.Harris (1995)
- Clathroporina japonica Zahlbr. (1927)
- Clathroporina locuples (Stizenb.) Zahlbr. (1922)
- Clathroporina mastoidea (Ach.) R.C.Harris (1995)
- Clathroporina megapotamica (Malme) Zahlbr. (1931)
- Clathroporina nitidula (Malme) Zahlbr. (1931)
- Clathroporina ocellata (Malme) Zahlbr. (1931)
- Clathroporina pustulosa (Kremp.) Shirley (1890)
- Clathroporina rivularis (Zschacke) Keissl. (1937)
- Clathroporina sagedioides Zahlbr. (1926)
- Clathroporina saxatilis Zahlbr. (1941)
- Clathroporina subpungens (Malme) R.C.Harris (1995)
- Clathroporina superans Müll.Arg. (1895)
- Clathroporina translucens Müll.Arg. (1889)
- Clathroporina turgida (Vain.) Zahlbr. (1922)
- Clathroporina unculiformis Malme (1937)
- Clathroporina verruculosa (Vain.) Zahlbr. (1931)
- Clathroporina wainiana Zahlbr. (1902)
- Clathroporina wellingtonii (Stirt.) Müll.Arg. (1894)
