= Rhexophiale =

Scientific classification
- Domain: Eukaryota
- Kingdom: Fungi
- Division: Ascomycota
- Class: Lecanoromycetes
- Order: Ostropales
- Family: Sagiolechiaceae
- Genus: Rhexophiale; Th.Fr. (1860)

Type species
- Rhexophiale coronata Th.Fr. (1860)

Species
- R. coronata R. rhexoblephara

Genus of lichens

Rhexophiale is a small genus of lichen-forming fungi in the family Sagiolechiaceae. The genus was circumscribed by Theodor Magnus Fries in 1860. It comprises two species:

- Rhexophiale coronata Th.Fr. (1860)
- Rhexophiale rhexoblephara (Nyl.) Almq. (1887)

Molecular phylogenetics analysis has shown that Rhexophiale coronata lies within a clade with Sagiolechia phaeospora and S. protuberans, which challenges the distinctiveness of the genus Rhexophiale.
