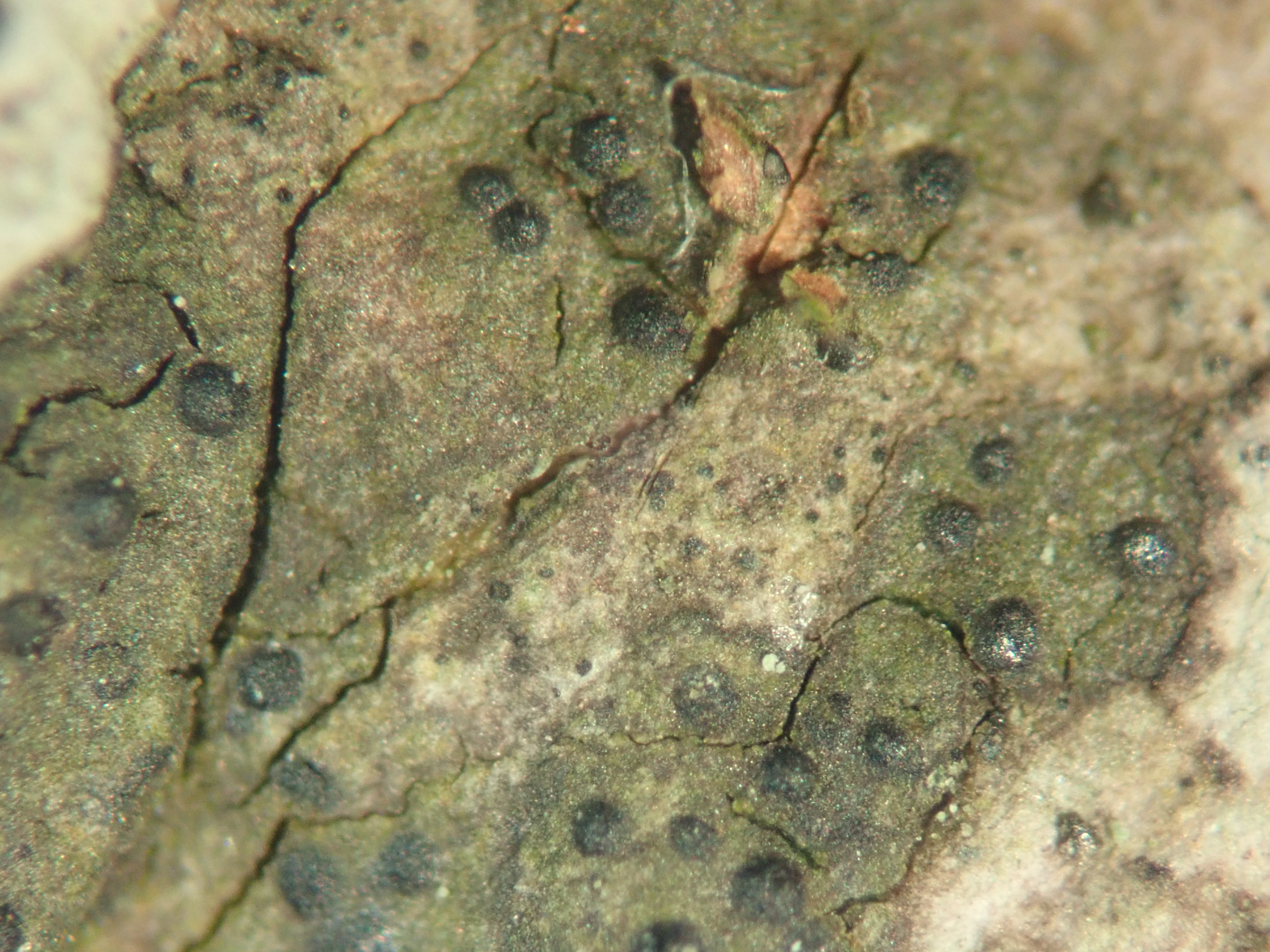
- Pseudosagedia aenea

Scientific classification
- Domain: Eukaryota
- Kingdom: Fungi
- Division: Ascomycota
- Class: Lecanoromycetes
- Order: Gyalectales
- Family: Porinaceae
- Genus: Pseudosagedia (Müll.Arg.) M.Choisy (1949)

Type species
- Pseudosagedia cerasi (Schrad.) M.Choisy (1949)

Species
- See text

Synonyms
- Arthopyrenia sect. Pseudosagedia Müll.Arg. (1862)

= Pseudosagedia =

Genus of fungi

Pseudosagedia is a genus of corticolous (bark-dwelling) lichens in the family Porinaceae. It was first circumscribed as a section of genus Arthopyrenia by Swiss botanist Johannes Müller Argoviensis in 1862. Maurice Choisy elevated it to distinct generic status in 1949. Pseudosagedia was little used until, in 1995, Josef Hafellner and Klaus Kalb resurrected the genus to contain members of the Porina nitidula species group with the perithecial pigment called Pseudosagedia-violet and lacking setae.

== Species ==
As of January 2025, Species Fungorum (via the Catalog of Life) accepts 30 species of Pseudosagedia.

- Pseudosagedia aenea (Körb.) Hafellner & Kalb (1995)
- Pseudosagedia atrocoerulea (Müll.Arg.) Hafellner & Kalb (1995)
- Pseudosagedia austriaca (Körb.) Hafellner (2001)
- Pseudosagedia borreri (Trevis.) Hafellner & Kalb (1995)
- Pseudosagedia cestrensis (Tuck. ex E.Michener) R.C.Harris (2005)
- Pseudosagedia chlorotica (Ach.) Hafellner & Kalb (1995)
- Pseudosagedia corruscans (Rehm) Hafellner & Kalb (1995)
- Pseudosagedia crocynioides (R.C.Harris) R.C.Harris (2005)
- Pseudosagedia curnowii (A.L.Sm.) Hafellner & Kalb (1995)
- Pseudosagedia fallax (Nyl.) Oxner (1956)
- Pseudosagedia ginzbergeri (Zahlbr.) Hafellner & Kalb (1995)
- Pseudosagedia globulans (Vain.) Hafellner (2002)
- Pseudosagedia grandis (Körb.) Hafellner & Kalb (1995)
- Pseudosagedia guentheri (Flot.) Hafellner & Kalb (1995)
- Pseudosagedia impressa (R.Sant.) Hafellner & Kalb (1995)
- Pseudosagedia interjungens (Nyl.) Hafellner & Kalb (1995)
- Pseudosagedia isidiata (R.C.Harris) R.C.Harris (2005)
- Pseudosagedia laticarpa (Lücking) Hafellner & Kalb (1995)
- Pseudosagedia leptospora (Nyl.) Hafellner (2008)
- Pseudosagedia linearis (Leight.) Hafellner & Kalb (1995)
- Pseudosagedia lucens (Taylor) Hafellner (2018)
- Pseudosagedia nitidula (Müll.Arg.) Hafellner & Kalb (1995)
- Pseudosagedia obsoleta (Oxner) Hafellner & Kalb (1995)
- Pseudosagedia oleriana (A.Massal.) Hafellner & Kalb (1995)
- Pseudosagedia papillifera (F.Schill.) Hafellner & Kalb (1995)
- Pseudosagedia rapaeformis (Vain.) Hafellner & Kalb (1995)
- Pseudosagedia rhaphidosperma (Müll.Arg.) R.C.Harris (2005)
- Pseudosagedia thaxteri (R.Sant.) Hafellner & Kalb (1995)
- Pseudosagedia umbilicata (Müll.Arg.) Hafellner & Kalb (1995)
- Pseudosagedia whinrayi (P.M.McCarthy) Hafellner & Kalb (1995)
