= Trichothelium =

Scientific classification
- Domain: Eukaryota
- Kingdom: Fungi
- Division: Ascomycota
- Class: Lecanoromycetes
- Order: Gyalectales
- Family: Porinaceae
- Genus: Trichothelium; Müll.Arg. (1885)

Type species
- Trichothelium epiphyllum Müll.Arg. (1885)

Synonyms
- Actiniopsis Starbäck (1899); Asteropeltis Henn. (1904); Ophiodictyon Sacc. & P.Syd. (1902); Stereochlamydomyces Cif. & Tomas. (1953); Stereochlamys Müll.Arg. (1885); Trichotheliomyces Cif. & Tomas. (1953)

Genus of lichens

Trichothelium is a genus of lichen-forming fungi in the family Porinaceae. It has an estimated 40 species. The genus was circumscribed by the Swiss lichenologist Johannes Müller Argoviensis in 1885, with Trichothelium epiphyllum assigned as the type species.

== Species ==
- Trichothelium africanum Lücking (2008)
- Trichothelium akeassii U.Becker & Lücking (1995)
- Trichothelium alboatrum Vain. (1921)
- Trichothelium album Lücking (1991)
- Trichothelium amazonense Bat., J.L.Bezerra & Cavalc. (1970)
- Trichothelium americanum Lendemer (2015)
- Trichothelium angustisporum M.Cáceres & Lücking (2004)
- Trichothelium argenteum Lücking & L.I.Ferraro (1997)
- Trichothelium assurgens (Cooke) Aptroot & Lücking (2001)
- Trichothelium caudatum Lücking (2004)
- Trichothelium chlorinum Rain.Schub. & Lücking (2003)
- Trichothelium confusum Lücking (2006)
- Trichothelium intermedium Lücking (2004)
- Trichothelium javanicum (F.Schill.) Vězda (1994)
- Trichothelium kalbii Lücking (2004)
- Trichothelium longisetum P.M.McCarthy & Palice (2003)
- Trichothelium meridionale P.M.McCarthy & Kantvilas (2000)
- Trichothelium mirum Lücking (1998)
- Trichothelium montanum Lücking (2008)
- Trichothelium oceanicum P.M.McCarthy (2001)
- Trichothelium pallescens (Müll.Arg.) F.Schill. (1927)
- Trichothelium pallidum Lücking (2006)
- Trichothelium pauciseptatum Vězda (1994)
- Trichothelium philippinum Vain. (1921)
- Trichothelium poeltii Lücking (1998)
- Trichothelium porinoides Vězda (1994)
- Trichothelium robinsonii Vain. (1921)
- Trichothelium rubellum Malcolm & Vězda (1995)
- Trichothelium rubescens Lücking (1991)
- Trichothelium sipmanii Lücking (1998)
- Trichothelium subargenteum Flakus & Lücking (2008)
- Trichothelium wirthii Lücking (2008)

== Citations ==
=== Cited literature ===
- Lücking, Robert (2008). Foliicolous Lichenized Fungi. Flora Neotropica. Vol. 103. New York: New York Botanical Garden Press. ISBN 978-0-89327-491-7.
- Vainio, Edvard August (1921). "Lichenes insularum Philippinarum. III". Annales Academiae Scientiarum Fennicae Series A. 15 (6): 1–368.
