= Sagiolechiaceae =

Scientific classification
- Kingdom: Fungi
- Division: Ascomycota
- Class: Lecanoromycetes
- Order: Ostropales
- Family: Sagiolechiaceae; Baloch, Lücking, Lumbsch & Wedin (2010)

Genera
- Rhexophiale; Sagiolechia

Family of lichen-forming fungi

Sagiolechiaceae is a small family of lichen-forming fungi in the order Ostropales. It contains two genera, Rhexophiale, and Sagiolechia, the type genus.

Some Sagiolechiaceae species form crustose lichens with Trentepohlia-like photobiont partners (a genus of green algae); other do not form a thallus and are lichenicolous (i.e., they grow on other lichens). Asci are eight-spored with colourless ascospores that have transverse septa or are muriform (i.e. divided into chambers by both transverse and longitudinal septa). The genera Sagiolechia and Rhexophiale mainly differ from each other in how their fruiting bodies develop.

== Taxonomy ==
The family was circumscribed in 2010 by the lichenologists Elisabeth Baloch, Robert Lücking, H. Thorsten Lumbsch, and Mats Wedin. Molecular phylogenetics analysis showed that the two genera formed a distinct clade in Ostropales. Four species were included in the original circumscription of the family.

== Description ==
Members of the Sagiolechiaceae typically form crust-like (crustose) thalli, often containing green algae of the genus Trentepohlia as their photosynthetic partners. Some species, however, may lack a visible lichen body and instead grow on other lichens (lichenicolous).

Their reproductive structures, the apothecia, begin immersed in the thallus but later emerge and sit atop it (becoming sessile). These apothecia are usually dark brown to black and feature a slightly raised margin. This margin can be mostly intact, or it can develop a star-like pattern of deep cracks. Just beneath the surface, there is a dark brown to nearly black, carbon-like layer (the excipular layer). In some species, a conical structure interrupts the usually continuous, pale to nearly clear hymenium (the spore-bearing layer), lending the apothecia a distinctive, structured appearance. The upper part of this hymenium is often dark brown.

Internally, numerous thread-like structures called paraphyses are present. These can be simple or branched, sometimes connecting to each other, and are typically packed together in a sticky matrix. They are colourless (hyaline) and react with iodine-based staining tests, indicating the presence of starch-like compounds (amyloid).

The asci, which are the specialised sacs where spores develop, are cylindrical to club-shaped and each typically contains eight ascospores. They may or may not show a colour reaction with iodine stains and can have differently thickened tips. The spores themselves are colourless, divided by internal walls (transversely septate or partitioned into multiple compartments, known as muriform). In some cases, the spores are surrounded by a faint halo-like coating.
