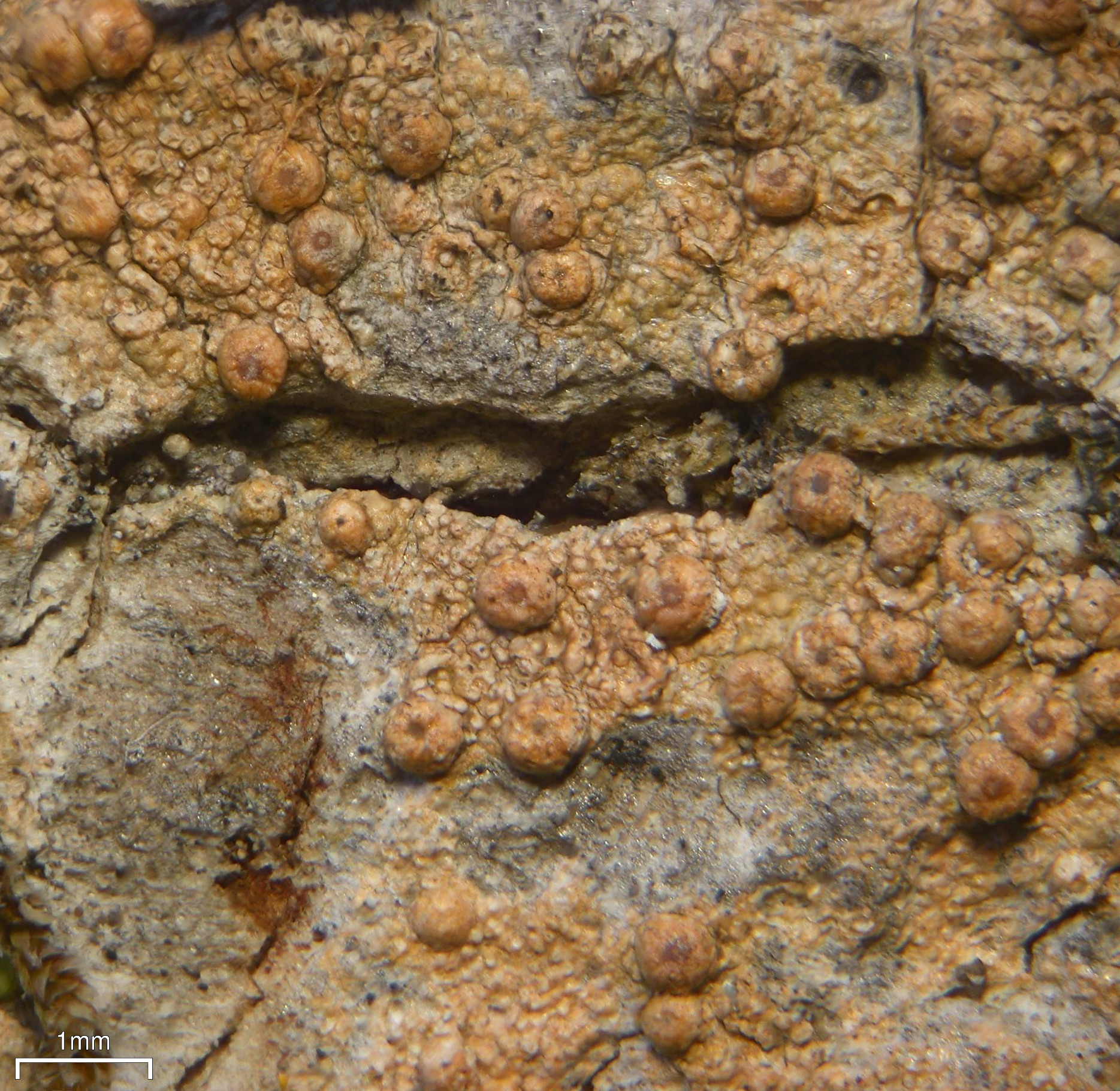
- Porina heterospora

Scientific classification
- Kingdom: Fungi
- Division: Ascomycota
- Class: Lecanoromycetes
- Order: Gyalectales
- Family: Porinaceae; Rchb. (1828)

Genera
- Clathroporina; Flabelloporina; Gallaicolichen; Myeloconis; Porina; Pseudosagedia; Saxiloba; Segestria; Trichothelium

Synonyms
- Trichotheliaceae Bitter & F.Schill. (1927); Clathroporinaceae Vězda ex Poelt (1974); Phragmopelthecaceae L.Xavier (1976); Porinaceae Walt.Watson (1929); Myeloconidiaceae P.M.McCarthy (2001)

= Porinaceae =

Family of lichen-forming fungi

Porinaceae is a family of lichen-forming fungi in the order Gyalectales. While Trichotheliaceae was proposed as an alternative, Porinaceae is the widely accepted name following ongoing nomenclatural discussions. Most members of this family typically have a crust-like appearance and grow on a variety of surfaces, including tree bark, leaves, and rocks. Porinaceae is known for its diverse morphology, ranging from simple crust-like forms to more complex structures with distinct lobes or fan-shaped scales. Porinaceae species generate small, typically flask-shaped reproductive structures (perithecia), which house spores essential for reproduction. It includes nine recognised genera and more than 365 species, with significant diversity in tropical and subtropical regions.

Recent research has illuminated the complex evolutionary history and taxonomic challenges within the family. Molecular phylogenetics research has identified numerous distinct groups within Porinaceae, leading to debates about its classification and nomenclature. Discoveries of genera with distinctive features, such as Flabelloporina, Saxiloba, and Gallaicolichen, have broadened the understanding of the Porinaceae's diversity. These findings have also challenged traditional classification methods, as the relationship between physical characteristics and genetic relationships is not always straightforward. Lichens in the Porinaceae have diverse habitat preferences across a range of climatic zones. The family's distribution patterns and substrate preferences reflect its evolutionary adaptations to different environmental conditions.

== Systematics ==
=== Historical taxonomy ===
Porinaceae was originally proposed by the German botanist Ludwig Reichenbach in 1828 under the name "Porineae". He called them Warzenkernflechten, meaning 'warty-core lichens', and included four genera: Porina, Chiodecton, Porothelium, Stigmatidium. The classification of Porinaceae shifted several times since the mid-20th century. In 1952, Rolf Santesson placed Porina species within the Strigulaceae, recognising their ascohymenial nature. Subsequently, the family was variously classified in orders such as Sphaeriales and Pyrenulales, reflecting the ongoing uncertainty about its taxonomic position.

A major change in classification came in 1995 when Josef Hafellner and Klaus Kalb introduced the order Trichotheliales to accommodate Porinaceae. However, the position of this order within the broader ascomycete classification remained unresolved for some time. Molecular phylogenetics studies, starting in the early 2000s, have provided clearer insights into the relationships within Porinaceae.

=== Nomenclature debates ===
The family Porinaceae is typified by the genus Porina, which has been a source of nomenclatural confusion. Originally based on Pertusaria pertusa, which was later considered a nomenclatural synonym of Pertusaria—an unrelated genus—Porina has historically been applied to species around Porina nucula following the work of Ferdinand von Mueller in 1883. This situation led to Porinaceae being treated as synonymous with Pertusariaceae for a time.

In 1996, a conservation proposal officially conserved Porina with P. nucula as the type species, confirming Porinaceae as the valid family name. A more recent nomenclatural debate arose in 2018 when Ekaphan Kraichak and colleagues proposed replacing the family name Porinaceae with Trichotheliaceae, citing specific rules from the International Code of Nomenclature (ICN). They invoked Article 18.3, which states that a family name is illegitimate if based on an illegitimate genus name, and Article 32.1(c), which requires a valid description or diagnosis for a name to be validly published.

This proposal was rejected by Robert Lücking in 2019. Lücking clarified that Porinaceae was first established by Reichenbach in 1828 under the name "Porineae", with clear designation as a family. He argued that according to ICN Article 18.4 Example 9, "Porineae" was automatically corrected to Porinaceae without altering the authorship or date. Lücking also contended that Article 32.1(c) did not apply in this case because the original publication met the requirements for valid publication.

=== Phylogenetics ===
The current understanding of Porinaceae's phylogenetic position began to take shape in the early 2000s. A pivotal study in 2004 by Grube, Baloch, and Lumbsch used molecular data to place Porinaceae within the Lecanoromycetes, specifically in a group later recognised as Ostropomycetidae. This research suggested close relationships between Porinaceae and families such as Graphidaceae, Gyalectaceae, and Stictidaceae, a finding largely corroborated by subsequent studies.

The 2004 study highlighted a unique way that Porinaceae and other Ostropomycetidae develop their fruiting bodies, termed hemiangiocarpous ontogeny. The researchers suggested that the closed, flask-shaped fruiting bodies (ascomata) of Porinaceae might have evolved through neotenic evolution. This hypothesis helped explain the family's distinctive features within the broader group. The study also noted that the evolution of pyrenocarpous ascomata in Porinaceae was accompanied by other hymenial adaptations, such as thin-walled asci and less conglutinate hymenial gel.

The current consensus among lichenologists maintains Porinaceae as the valid name for this fungal family, which is now placed in the order Gyalectales within the subclass Ostropomycetidae of the Lecanoromycetes.

Recent molecular phylogenetic studies have significantly advanced the understanding of Porinaceae's internal structure. A comprehensive analysis in 2024 identified 19 main clades within the family, revealing a complex evolutionary history. This research has also highlighted ongoing challenges in the family's genus-level classification. Current analyses suggest that Porina, as traditionally circumscribed, may be paraphyletic (not derived from a single lineage), with several other genera nested within it.

A significant development came from a 2014 study by Nelsen et al., which conclusively demonstrated that Myeloconidaceae, previously considered a separate family, is nested within Porinaceae. As a result, Myeloconidaceae was reduced to synonymy with Porinaceae. The same study revealed two main clades within Porinaceae, largely correlated with ascospore septation: one clade with muriform ascospores and another with transversely septate ascospores.

The genus Myeloconis, formerly the sole genus in Myeloconidaceae, was found to be monophyletic and placed within Porinaceae. Despite its unique features, particularly its yellow to orange medullary pigments, Myeloconis was retained as a separate genus within Porinaceae due to its distinct morphology and strongly supported monophyly.

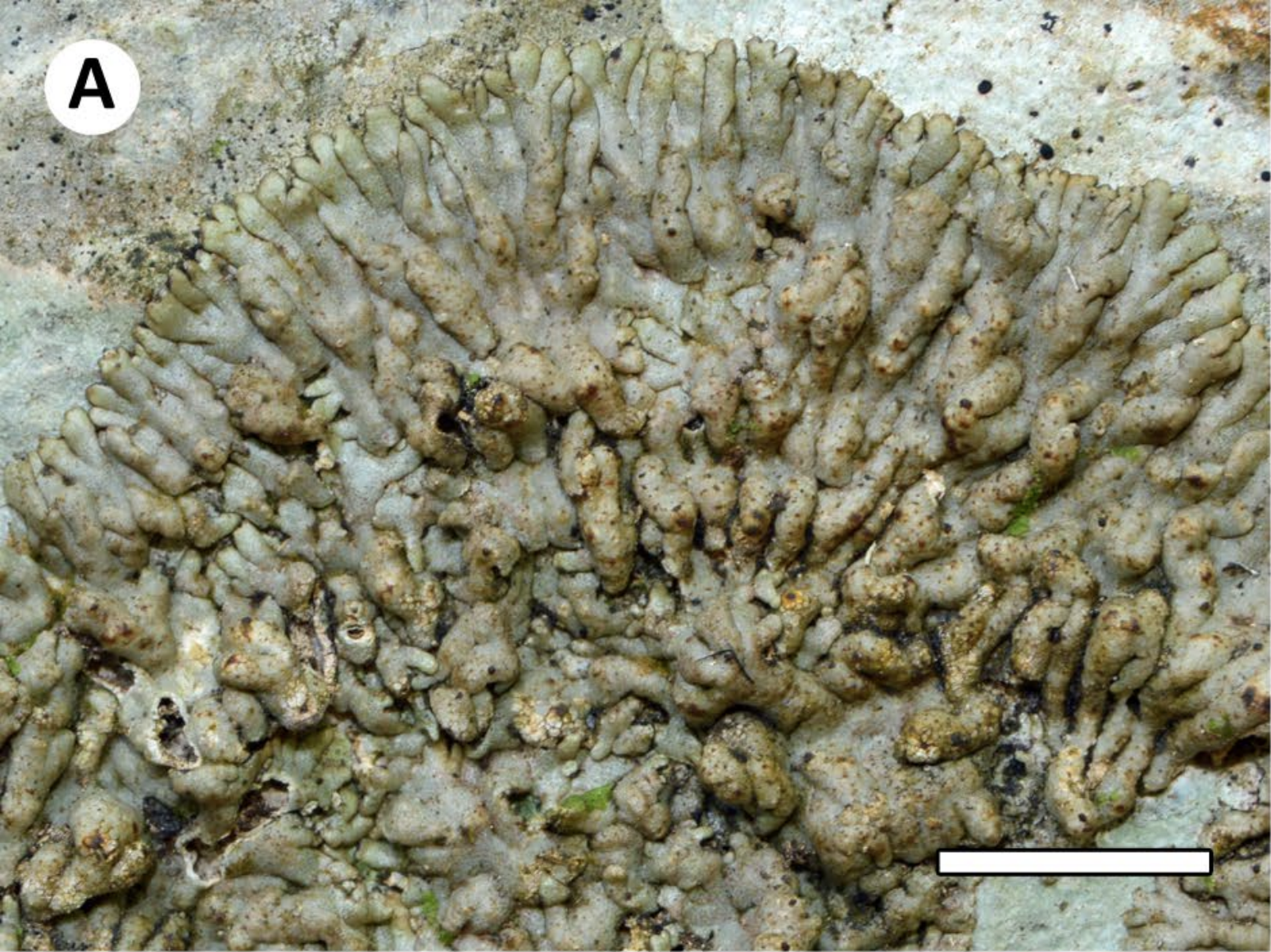
Saxiloba firmula

The discovery and phylogenetic placement of new genera have further complicated the family's taxonomy while expanding its known morphological diversity. For instance, the genus Saxiloba, described in 2020, forms a strongly supported lineage on a long branch within the family, separate from other genera such as Phragmopeltheca and Segestria. Similarly, the recently studied genus Gallaicolichen, with its unique reproductive structures, has been firmly placed within Porinaceae, closely related to certain Porina species.

These findings collectively support the notion that Porinaceae may need to be subdivided into a larger number of genera than previously recognised. However, the correlation between morphology and phylogeny in Porinaceae is not always straightforward. Some taxa with distinct morphologies are placed in unexpected positions in the family tree, challenging attempts at a clear-cut classification based on morphological characters alone. As a result of these complexities, some researchers have opted to retain a broader concept of Porina while awaiting more comprehensive sampling and additional genetic markers to resolve the family's internal relationships.

== Description ==
The Porinaceae consists of lichen-forming fungi that mostly have a crust-like, or crustose, appearance on the surfaces they inhabit. These lichens form a symbiotic relationship with green algae, typically from the genera Phycopeltis or Trentepohlia, which provide photosynthetic energy for the partnership.

The thallus structure in Porinaceae shows remarkable diversity. While many species exhibit a typical crustose form, others display unique morphologies. For instance, the genus Flabelloporina is characterised by a thallus bearing flabelliform (fan-shaped) squamules, a feature that expands the known morphological range of the family. Another example of thallus diversity is seen in Saxiloba, which has a distinctive placodioid thallus with a fenestrate anatomy, forming distinct lobes and growing on rock. Its thallus structure includes columnar crystal clusters embedded in a network of reticulate to meandering lines when viewed from above.

=== Reproductive structures ===
The fruiting bodies of these fungi, called ascomata, are often flask-shaped (perithecioid) and may be partially covered by a structure known as the involucrellum, which can sometimes be reduced or vestigial. In some groups within the family, the ascomata are further covered by a layer of the thallus (the main body of the lichen) and occasionally by an additional layer of small crystal clusters, referred to as the crystallostratum. These structures are sometimes adorned with setae, which are tiny hair-like projections.

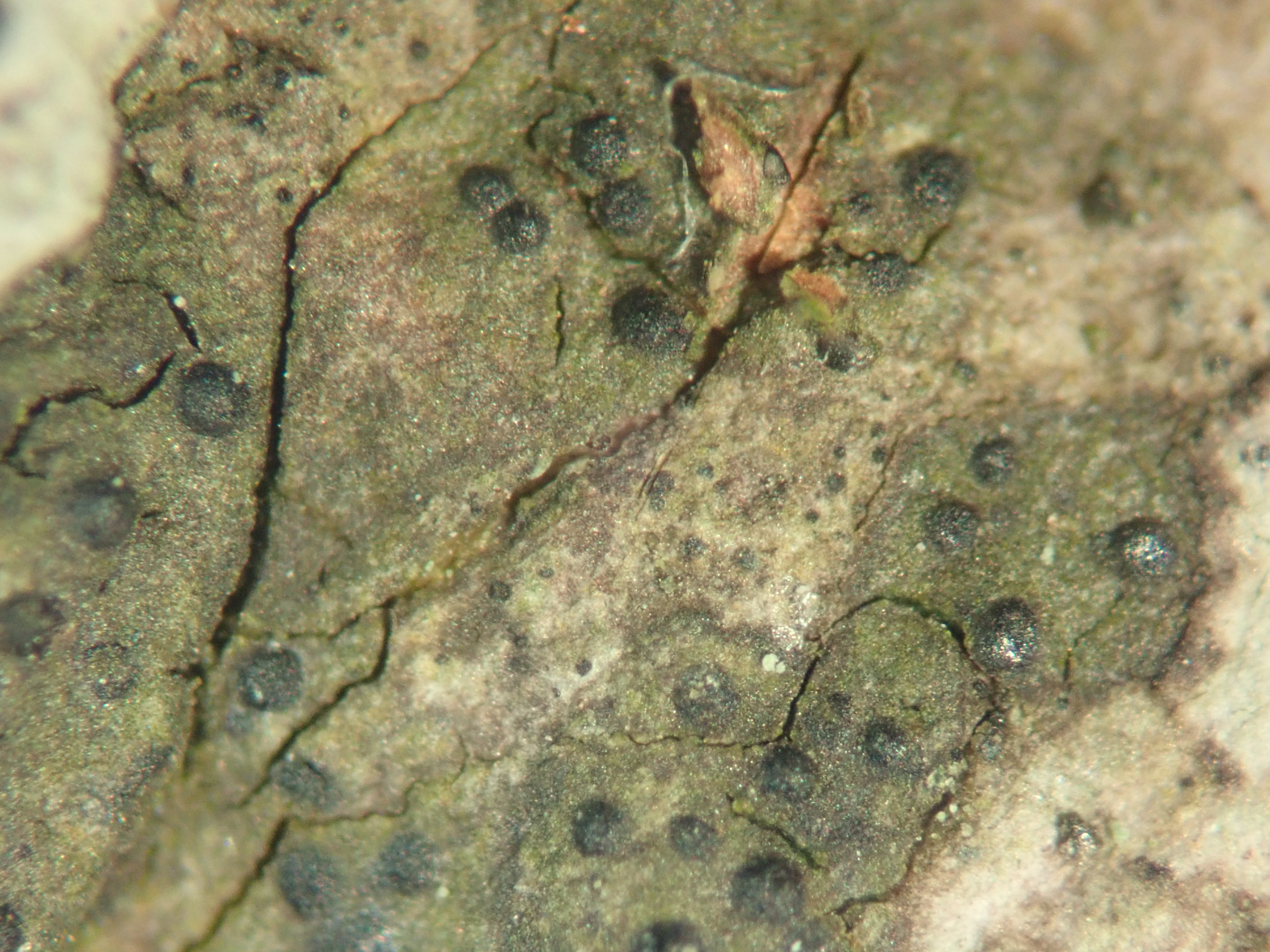
Pseudosagedia aenea

The ascomata in Porinaceae develop through a unique process where they start enclosed but gradually open as they mature. This developmental pattern is characteristic of the larger group Ostropomycetidae, to which Porinaceae belongs. The asci are typically thin-walled compared to other Ostropomycetidae, often featuring a faint chitinoid (resembling chitin) ring-structure around the ascus apex. The hymenial gel is less conglutinate than in related families, which may be an adaptation related to the pyrenocarpous ascomata.

Perithecial structure shows some variation within the family. Many species, particularly in the Porina epiphylla group, have perithecia almost completely covered by the thallus, including a layer of crystals termed the crystallostratum. Other species lack this crystallostratum and may have more exposed, often darker coloured perithecia. The development of the involucrellum (a protective layer around the perithecium) also varies, with some species having a well-developed, sometimes carbonised (blackened) involucrellum.

Inside the ascomata, the fungal tissue contains paraphyses, which are unbranched, sterile filaments that help support spore development. These structures do not react to iodine-based stains, indicating they are non-amyloid.

Some genera within Porinaceae have evolved unique reproductive structures. For example, Gallaicolichen possesses structures called peltidiangia. These produce disc-shaped diaspores known as peltidia, which consist of dichotomously branched algal cells arranged around a central foot, encapsulating a layer of fungal hyphae. This pattern of co-dispersal, where the photobiont envelops the mycobiont, is unprecedented in lichenised fungi.

=== Spores and conidia ===
The spores in Porinaceae are produced in sacs called asci, usually present in groups of eight. They vary in shape, from ellipsoid to cylindrical or spindle-shaped (fusiform), and are divided by thin cross-walls (septate), which can range from simple transverse divisions to a more complex, brick-like pattern (muriform). The spores are typically colourless (hyaline) and are often surrounded by a gelatinous sheath.

The family also produces asexual reproductive structures (conidiomata), which release tiny, non-septate (undivided) spores (conidia) that are either ellipsoid or thread-like (filiform) in shape.

== Morphological evolution and diversity ==
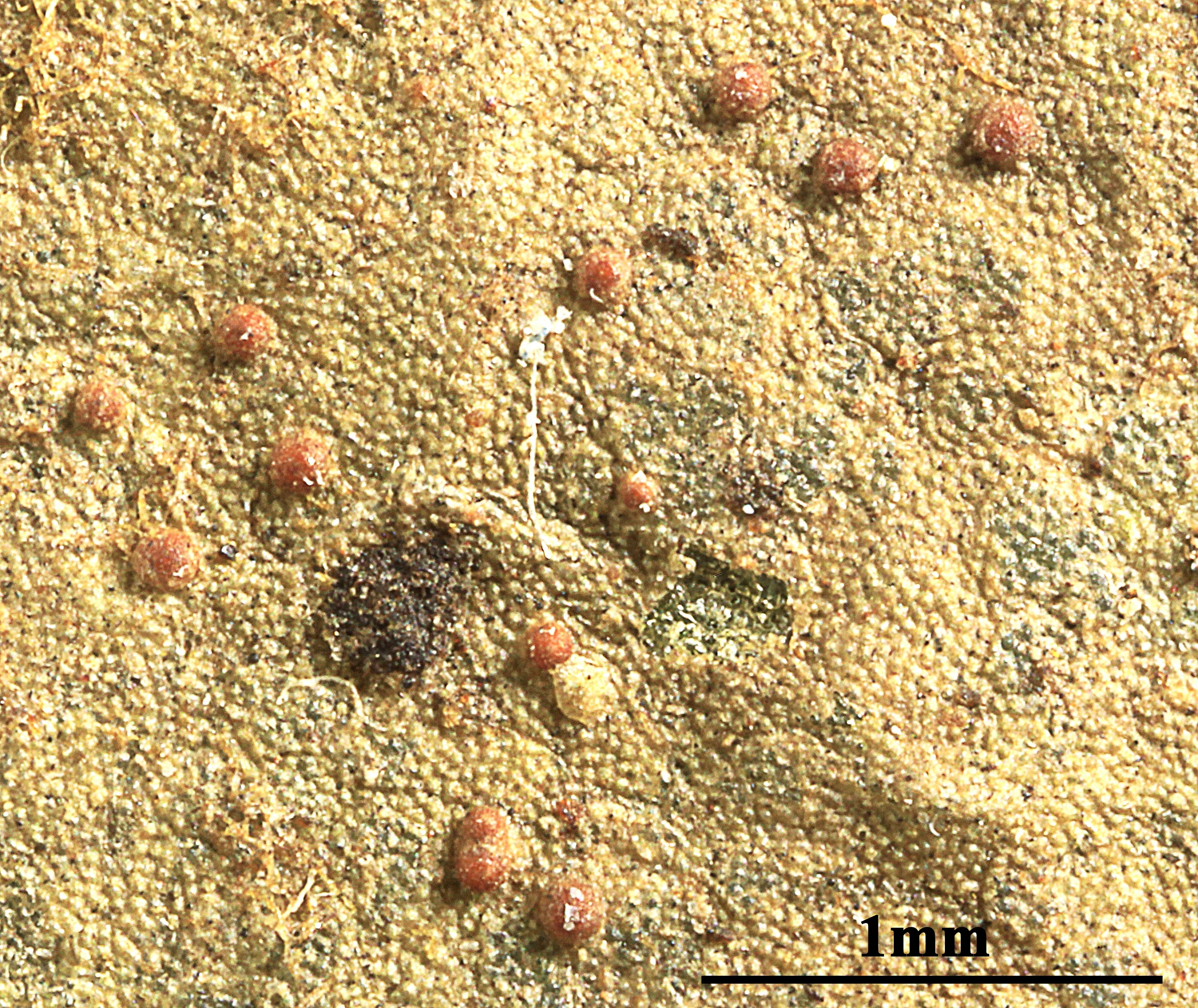
The leaf-dwelling lichen Porina leptosperma, photographed in Brazil

Studies of evolutionary relationships within Porinaceae have revealed patterns in how these lichens developed their distinctive features. One of the most significant findings involves the internal structure of their spores. The family has split into two main evolutionary groups: one group produces spores divided by both vertical and horizontal walls (muriform), while the other produces spores with only horizontal divisions (transversely septate). The persistence of these different spore patterns across related species suggests this trait has remained stable over millions of years of evolution.

Unlike spore structure, where species show consistent patterns within evolutionary groups, habitat preferences have evolved differently. For example, species that grow on leaves have evolved this ability multiple times in different lineages, rather than all inheriting it from a single common ancestor. Similarly, while different groups within the family show characteristic growth forms (such as the patterns seen in Porina, Trichothelium, and Clathroporina), these forms have sometimes evolved independently in unrelated groups, suggesting that growth form is more flexible over evolutionary time than spore structure.

The Porinaceae shows considerable variety in both its physical forms—ranging from simple crusts to complex scaled structures—and in how it reproduces. This diversity makes it challenging for scientists to classify these lichens based on appearance alone, emphasizing why both physical features and DNA evidence are needed to fully understand how different species are related to each other.

== Chemistry ==
In terms of secondary chemistry, members of the Porinaceae produce a variety of pigments, including characteristic hues like yellow (Porina yellow) or violet (Pseudosagedia violet). Additionally, some species contain compounds called phenalones, such as myeloconones, found in the inner layer of the thallus in certain genera, like Myeloconis.

== Habitat and distribution ==
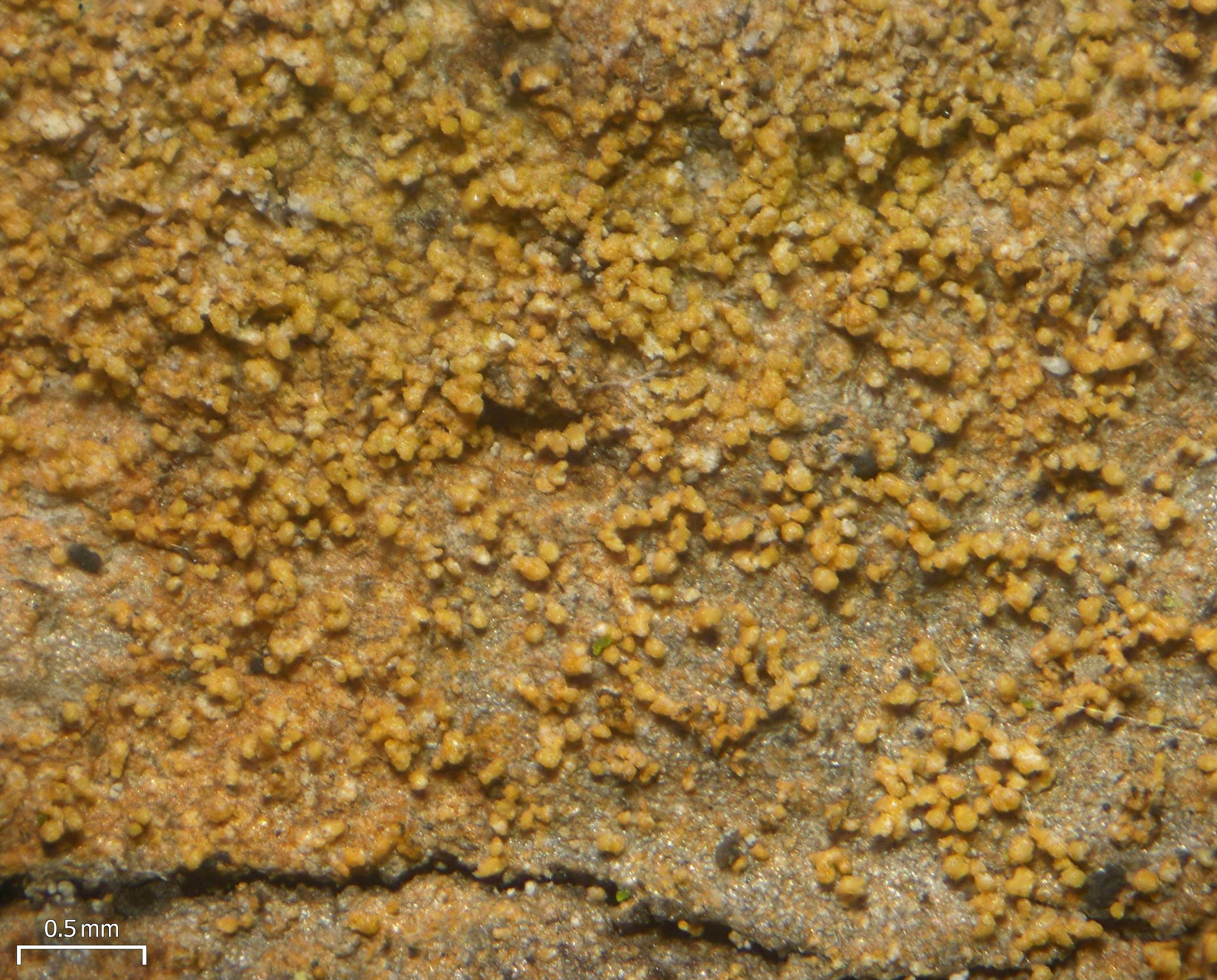
Porina scabrida

The Porinaceae has a wide ecological range, occurring on various substrates and across diverse climatic conditions. Species in this family grow primarily as epiphytes on bark and leaves, but are also found on rocks, demonstrating their ability to adapt to different habitats. Porina rivalis, found in Great Britain, is a saxicolous species with a semi-aquatic habitat.

In terms of substrate preferences, approximately 45% of Porinaceae species are primarily corticolous (bark-dwelling), 35% are mainly foliicolous (leaf-dwelling), and 20% are saxicolous (rock-dwelling). Notably, fewer than 10% of taxa occur on more than one substratum type, indicating a high degree of substrate specialisation within the family.

Geographically, Porinaceae has a subcosmopolitan distribution, with a strong tropical and subtropical emphasis. Up to 75% of Porinaceae species are found in tropical and/or subtropical regions, while the remainder occur mainly in temperate latitudes. The family's diversity decreases rapidly towards higher latitudes, with only two species known with certainty from north of the Arctic Circle, and one from Antarctica. Similarly, hot arid regions have very few or no Porinaceae species.

The global distribution of Porinaceae reveals several centres of diversity. Brazil emerges as a significant area of species richness, with 122 taxa recorded, of which 21 are endemic. Australasia, encompassing Australia, New Zealand, Lord Howe Island, and Norfolk Island, harbours a comparable level of diversity with 119 taxa, including 46 endemics. Central America, spanning from Mexico to Panama, supports 106 taxa, with 10 being endemic to the region. Australia, when considered separately from the broader Australasian context, is home to 96 taxa, 22 of which are endemic. Notably, Costa Rica, despite its relatively small land area, supports a considerable 94 taxa, including 7 endemics.

Other regions of high Porinaceae diversity include India (58 taxa, 16 endemics), Ecuador (56 taxa, 4 endemics), and New Caledonia, Vanuatu and Solomon Islands collectively (47 taxa, 5 endemics).

Very few species of Porinaceae can be considered cosmopolitan. In contrast to some other lichen families like Verrucariaceae, very few Porinaceae species are common to both northern and southern temperate regions, suggesting a degree of geographical isolation in the family's evolutionary history.

== Genera ==
According to a 2022 survey of fungal classification, Porinaceae (as Trichotheliaceae) contains eight genera and about 365 species, but this total does not account for the most recent genus addition to the family, Flabelloporina.

- Clathroporina Müll.Arg (1882) – ca. 25
- Flabelloporina Sobreira, M.Cáceres & Lücking (2018) – 1 sp.
- Gallaicolichen Sérus. & Lücking (2007) – 1 sp.
- Myeloconis P.M.McCarthy & Elix (1996) – 4 spp.
- Porina Ach. (1809) – ca. 160 spp.
- Pseudosagedia (Müll.Arg.) Choisy (1949) – 80 spp.
- Saxiloba Lücking, Moncada & Viñas (2020) – 2 spp.
- Segestria Fr. (1825) – 70 spp.
- Trichothelium Müll.Arg. (1885) – 40 spp.
