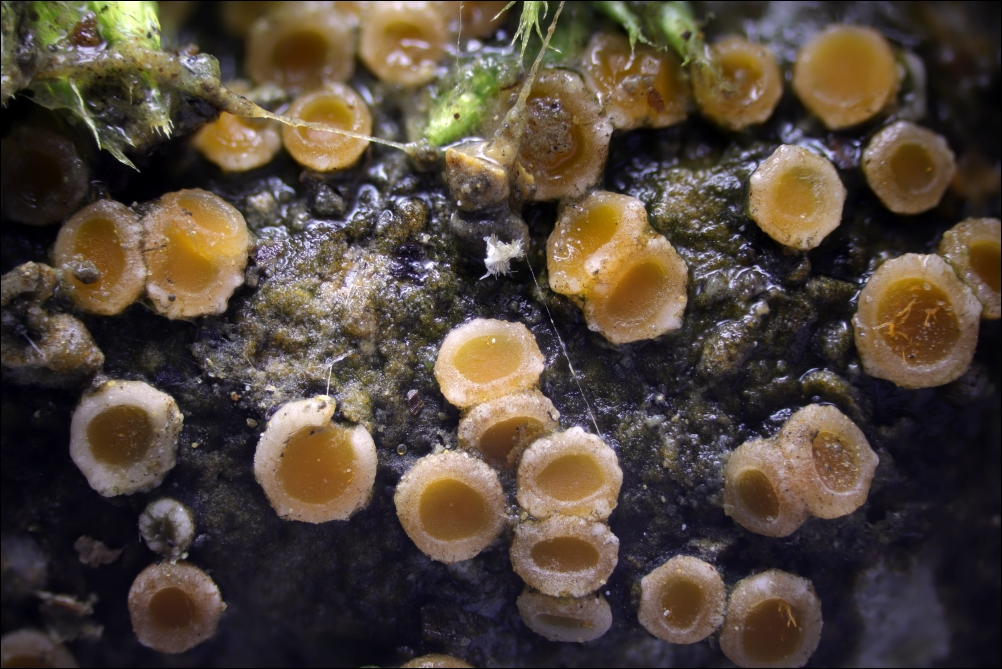
- Apothecia of Gyalecta jenensis

Scientific classification
- Kingdom: Fungi
- Division: Ascomycota
- Class: Lecanoromycetes
- Subclass: Ostropomycetidae
- Order: Gyalectales; Henssen ex D.Hawksw. & O.E.Erikss. (1986)

Families
- Coenogoniaceae; Gyalectaceae; Phlyctidaceae; Porinaceae; Sagiolechiaceae

= Gyalectales =

Order of lichen-forming fungi

Gyalectales is an order of lichen-forming fungi in the class Lecanoromycetes. It contains 5 families, 18 genera and about 550 species.

== Taxonomy ==
The Gyalectales were introduced in a 1974 publication by Aino Henssen and Martin Jahns, but not formally published until 1986 by David Hawksworth and Ove Eriksson.

=== Phylogeny ===
An early (2002) phylogenetics study showed that the order Ostropales, as was then circumscribed, was paraphyletic, and proposed that the Ostropales sensu lato included the Gyalectales and Trapeliaceae. Although they had traditionally been considered to be only distantly related, molecular studies suggested a much closer phylogenetic relationship. As a result, of the molecular data, Kauff and Lutzoni subsumed the Gyalectales into the Ostropales, as the latter name was published earlier (1932 vs. 1986).

In 2018, Kraichak and colleagues used a recently developed "temporal phylogenetic" approach to identify temporal bands for specific taxonomic ranks. Based on this approach, clades that share a common ancestor between 176 and 194 Mya and a time window of 111–135 Mya correspond to order-level and family-level, respectively. The Gyalectales clade, consisting of the families Trichotheliaceae, Coenogoniaceae, Sagiolechiaceae, Gyalectaceae and Phlyctidaceae, has a crown node that falls within the temporal band for orders. For this reason the name Gyalectales was resurrected to represent the monophyletic clade. Gyalectales itself is placed in Ostropomycetidae, one of two major subclasses in the Lecanoromycetes.

This proposed classification has been accepted in a later review of the temporal banding method for fungus systematics, as well a 2022 update on fungal classification.

== Families and genera ==
This is a list of the families and genera contained within the Gyalectales, based on a 2022 review and summary of fungal classification. Following the taxon name is the taxonomic authority, year of publication, and (for genera) the number of species:

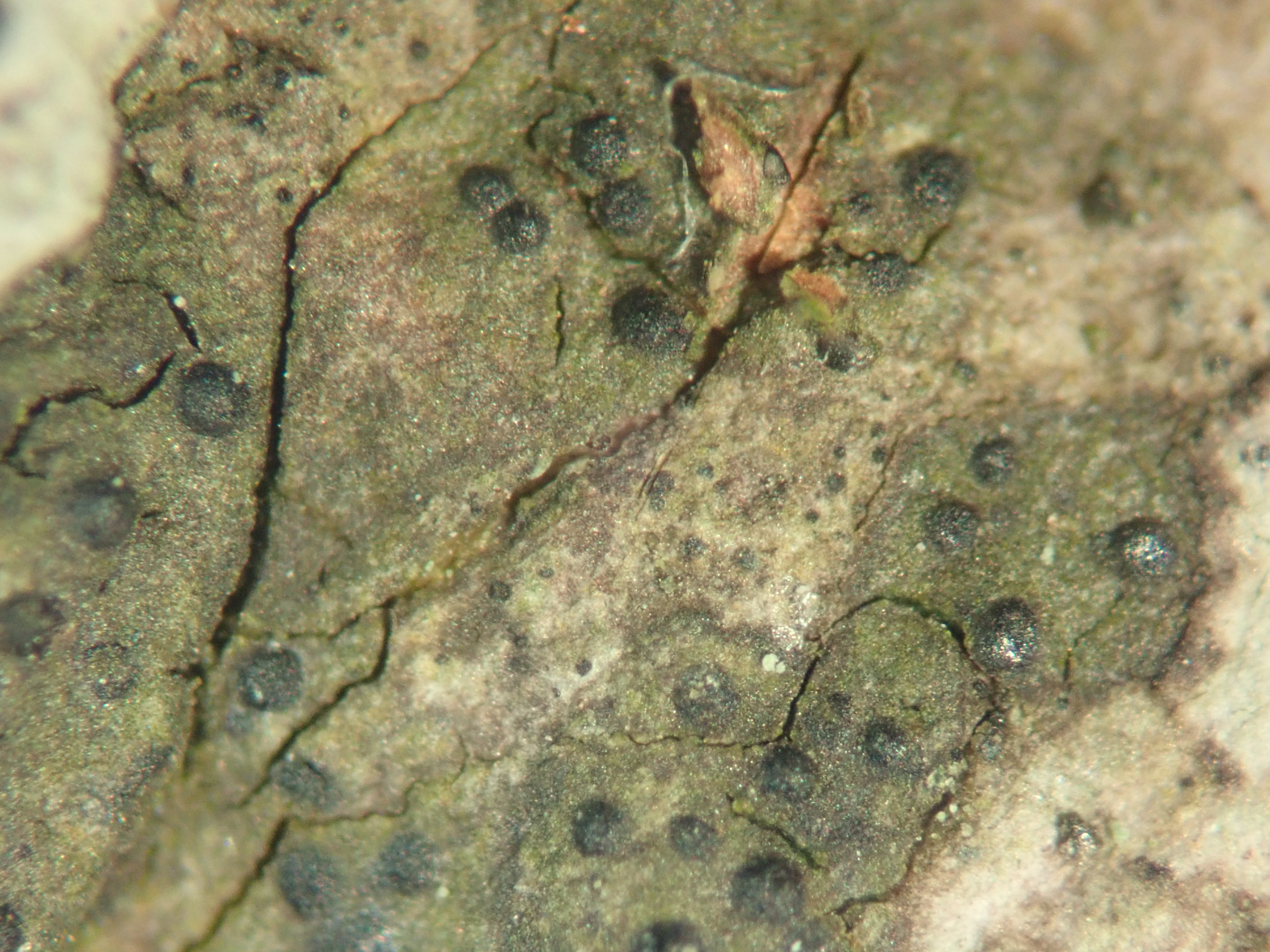
Pseudosagedia aenea

- Coenogoniaceae Stizenb. (1862)

Coenogonium Ehrenb. (1820) – ca. 91 spp.

- Gyalectaceae Stizenb. (1862)

Cryptolechia A.Massal. (1853) – 11 spp.
Francisrosea Ertz & Sanderson (2021) – 1 sp.
Gyalecta Ach. (1808) – 50 spp.
Neopetractis Ertz (2021) – 2 spp.
Ramonia Stizenb. (1862) – 24 spp.
Semigyalecta Vain. (1921) – 1 sp.

- Phlyctidaceae Poelt ex J.C.David & D.Hawksw. (1991)

Phlyctis (Wallr.) Flot. (1850) – 20 spp.
Psathyrophlyctis Brusse (1987) – 1 sp.

- Sagiolechiaceae Baloch, Lücking, Lumbsch & Wedin (2010)

Rhexophiale Th.Fr. (1860) – 1 sp.
Sagiolechia A.Massal. (1854) – 3 spp.

- Porinaceae Rchb. (1828)

Clathroporina Müll.Arg (1882) – ca. 25 spp.
Flabelloporina Sobreira, M.Cáceres & Lücking (2018) – 1 sp.
Myeloconis P.M.McCarthy & Elix (1996) – 4 spp.
Porina Ach. (1809) – ca. 145 spp.
Pseudosagedia (Müll.Arg.) Choisy (1949) – 80 spp.
Saxiloba Lücking, Moncada & Viñas (2020) – 2 spp.
Segestria Fr. (1825) – 70 spp.
Trichothelium Müll.Arg. (1885) – 40 spp.
