= Trypetheliopsis kassamensis =

Scientific classification
- Kingdom: Fungi
- Division: Ascomycota
- Class: Dothideomycetes
- Order: Monoblastiales
- Family: Monoblastiaceae
- Genus: Trypetheliopsis
- Species: T. kassamensis

Binomial name
- Trypetheliopsis kassamensis (Sérus.) Aptroot (2009)

Synonyms
- Musaespora kassamensis Sérus. (1997)

Species of lichen-forming fungus

Trypetheliopsis kassamensis is a species of corticolous (bark-dwelling) crustose lichen in the family Monoblastiaceae. The species was first described in 1997 by Emmanuël Sérusiaux as Musaespora kassamensis, based on material from Kassam Pass in Papua New Guinea, and was transferred to Trypetheliopsis in 2009; it has since been recorded from Costa Rica. It is distinguished from related species by a saffron to orange-yellow pigment inside its spore-producing structures that turns carmine red with potassium hydroxide solution.

== Taxonomy ==
The lichen was first formally described in 1997 by Emmanuël Sérusiaux, as Musaespora kassamensis. The type specimen was collected from Kassam Pass (Eastern Highlands province, Papua New Guinea) at an elevation of around 1400 m.

In 2009, following a study of numerous herbarium specimens of pyrenocarpous lichens collected in Japan, Kashiwadani and colleagues "resurrected" the genus Trypetheliopsis and reclassified several species within it. They also determined that Musaespora was closely related to Trypetheliopsis, and established Musaespora as a synonym of that genus. As part of this revision Aptroot proposed the new combination Trypetheliopsis kassamensis for Sérusiaux's species.

== Description ==
Trypetheliopsis kassamensis differs from the otherwise similar species T. gigas and T. kalbii in a small but distinctive set of microscopic features. Inside the tube of the campylidia (the curved, spore-producing structures), it has a saffron to orange-yellow pigment that turns carmine red when treated with potassium hydroxide solution (a K+ reaction). Its perithecia (the flask-shaped fruiting bodies that contain the asci and ascospores) are simple in structure, brown to grey in colour, slightly flattened, and have a depressed ostiole (the pore at the top through which the spores are released).

== Habitat and distribution ==
Trypetheliopsis kassamensis is a corticolous (bark-dwelling) lichen. In its type locality, it was found growing on a small tree in a highly disturbed forest on the side of a road. It has since been recorded from Costa Rica.
