= Megalotremis cauliflora =

Scientific classification
- Kingdom: Fungi
- Division: Ascomycota
- Class: Dothideomycetes
- Order: Monoblastiales
- Family: Monoblastiaceae
- Genus: Megalotremis
- Species: M. cauliflora

Binomial name
- Megalotremis cauliflora Aptroot, Sérus. & Lücking (2008)

Species of lichen-forming fungus

Megalotremis cauliflora is a species of corticolous (bark-dwelling), crustose lichen in the family Monoblastiaceae. It was described as a new species in 2008 based on material collected in Guadeloupe, and has since been reported from Sri Lanka. The lichen forms glossy, pale gray patches on bark that can spread across several centimeters, with the perithecia (flask-shaped fruiting bodies) mostly buried in the thallus and visible only as slight bumps. It is unusual for the genus in having tiny brown, flattened blobs made of stuck-together spores at the openings of its asexual structures (pycnidia).

== Taxonomy ==
It was described as a new species in 2008 by the lichenologists André Aptroot, Emmanuël Sérusiaux and Robert Lücking, based on material collected in Guadeloupe.

== Description ==
The lichen forms a glossy, pale mineral-gray to almost glassy-looking thallus (the main lichen body) that can spread over bark or overgrow loose plant debris, sometimes covering an area up to about 10 cm (4 in) across. The colony margin is typically traced by a thin, black line of hypothallus (a dark border of fungal tissue) up to 0.2 mm wide. Its photobiont is a trentepohlioid green alga, with cells up to about 12 × 6 μm.

The perithecia (flask-shaped fruiting bodies) are immersed in the thallus and may be invisible from above, or show only as a slight swelling, each with a tiny black ostiole (opening). They are globose and about 0.2–0.4 mm in diameter, with a carbonized wall roughly 50–100 μm thick. Under the microscope, the hamathecium (the tissue between the asci) is pale yellowish and clear rather than oil-speckled (not inspersed), and it does not change color in an iodine test (IKI–); the threadlike filaments form a tangled network (anastomosing), and the asci lack an ocular chamber. Each ascus contains from one to four ascospores that are colorless at maturity and divided by a single median septum, measuring about 110–130 × 25–45 μm. The spore wall is 2–3 μm thick, with rounded internal compartments (lumina) and an outer surface bearing low, obliquely oriented warts about 1 × 2 μm. No lichen products were detected in the thallus. The species is mainly characterized by its laterally positioned ostioles. Similar immersed perithecia occur in Megalotremis biocellata and Megalotremis verrucosa, but those taxa have 2–4 spores per ascus with a symmetrical septum. In habitat terms, its occurrence on coastal palms was treated as unusual for the genus, which is otherwise generally associated with wet-forest settings.

The asexual structures are especially distinctive. The conidiomata are pycnidia immersed in the thallus, more or less spherical to somewhat pear-shaped, about 0.2–0.3 mm in diameter, with a carbonized wall around 25 μm thick. The brown ostiole forms a short, neck-like projection about 0.2 mm tall, and it is capped by 5–15 tightly packed, flattened brown globules made of extruded conidia that resemble blood cells in shape. These globules are about 100–150 μm across and consist of densely agglutinated conidia that have turned brown; the conidia are produced within the pycnidia on colorless conidiogenous cells (about 10 × 1 μm) and are rod-shaped, colorless, and roughly 6–9 × 2.5–3 μm, already sticking together before being extruded. The original description emphasized that this is the first known Megalotremis (and, more generally, a lichenized fungus) reported with conspicuous brown blobs of agglutinated conidia outside the pycnidia, and suggested that their erythrocyte-like form may result from collapsing after drying; strong conidial agglutination is known in related genera such as Anisomeridium and Caprettia, and in some Coenogonium species, but without the same shape reported here.

== Habitat and distribution ==
Beyond the type collection from Guadeloupe, northwest of Soufrière, along the Trace Victor Hugues at 800–900 m (2,600–3,000 ft), additional collections were reported from Costa Rica, including sites in Alajuela (e.g., Tenorio Volcano National Park), and in Guanacaste (including the Novasa wind project area). These records came from exposed trees, fence posts, stumps, roots, and shrubs in moist to cloud forest zones and adjacent pasture or clearing settings, where the lichen was found on bark, often on lower stems or trunks. In 2016, it was recorded from Sri Lanka, which was its first palaeotropical record.
