= Trypetheliopsis yoshimurae =

Scientific classification
- Kingdom: Fungi
- Division: Ascomycota
- Class: Dothideomycetes
- Order: Monoblastiales
- Family: Monoblastiaceae
- Genus: Trypetheliopsis
- Species: T. yoshimurae

Binomial name
- Trypetheliopsis yoshimurae H.Harada (2017)

Species of lichen-forming fungus

Trypetheliopsis yoshimurae is a species of lichen-forming fungus in the family Monoblastiaceae. It grows on the bark of evergreen broad-leaved trees in Japan, unlike most of its relatives which live on the surface of living leaves. The lichen forms a thin, greyish-green crust with clustered fruiting bodies that have distinctive dark purplish-brown tops. It was named in honour of the Japanese lichenologist Isao Yoshimura.

== Taxonomy ==
The lichen was described by the Japanese lichenologist Hiroshi Harada in 2017. It is based on a holotype from material collected by Hiroshi Harada (no. 25605) on 16 December 2008. The type specimen, identified as Trypetheliopsis yoshimurae and housed in the herbarium of the Natural History Museum and Institute, Chiba (CBM FL-23942), was gathered on the trunk of an evergreen broad-leaved tree at about 260 m elevation near Shirakawa in Nishiizu town, on the Izu Peninsula in Honshu, Japan. The species epithet honours the Japanese botanist and lichenologist Isao Yoshimura.

Trypetheliopsis yoshimurae differs from previously known members of the genus by its non-foliicolous habit (it does not grow on living leaves), the absence of red pigments around the wart-like perithecial swellings and pycnidia, the aggregation of perithecia into these verrucae, an inspersed hymenium with abundant oil droplets, and relatively large ascospores measuring 55–74 × 17–22 micrometres. Within the Japanese funga of pyrenocarpous lichens that produce campylidia, T. yoshimurae is distinguished from T. boninensis, which has red perithecial verrucae, and from T. epiphylla, which is strictly foliicolous. Within Japan, the genus Trypetheliopsis is distinctive among pyrenocarpous lichens for producing campylidia, and only three species are currently recognised from the country: T. boninensis, T. epiphylla and T. yoshimurae.

== Description ==
Trypetheliopsis yoshimurae has a thin, crustose thallus that lies on the surface of the substrate rather than sinking into it. The thallus is continuous rather than broken into patches, greenish grey to greyish green, somewhat glossy and smooth, with a distinct outer cortex. The sexual fruiting bodies are grouped into slightly to strongly raised, wart-like perithecial swellings 0.7–1.5 mm across that spread at the base. Their tops are dark purplish brown with a paler, slightly sunken centre where one to several pore-like ostioles open to the outside.

Inside the perithecia, the hymenium is densely filled with oil droplets, and the hamathecium consists of branched, interconnected filaments. The asci are club-shaped, 120–130 × about 50 μm, with markedly thickened upper walls and a clearly defined ocular chamber. Each ascus contains 5–8 ascospores that are ellipsoid, slightly curved and divided by a single cross wall. The spores measure 55–74 × 17–22 μm, with the two cells slightly swollen and sometimes a little constricted or thickened at the septum; the spore walls are evenly 2–3 μm thick and lack a separate outer perispore.

Asexual reproduction takes place in specialised campylidia-like pycnidia. These structures have a collar-like extension that is blackish to dark purplish grey-brown, entire or dissected at the tips, and open on the side facing away from gravity. They are 0.4–0.7 mm high in total, consist of a single internal cavity packed with conidia, and are lined by a 15–25 μm thick layer of conidiophores. The conidia are single-celled, ellipsoid to ovoid, and measure 5–6.5 (rarely up to 10) × about 3 μm.

== Habitat and distribution ==
Trypetheliopsis yoshimurae is known from warm-temperate regions of Japan on the Pacific side of the mainland, originally reported from Shizuoka, Kōchi, Miyazaki and Kagoshima Prefectures. A later survey of the lichen funga of Chiba Prefecture recorded the species as new to that prefecture, extending its known range northwards and making Chiba the northern limit of its distribution. The lichen grows on the bark of evergreen and deciduous broad-leaved trees and occasionally on rock; the Chiba material was collected on the trunk of Quercus acuta in low-montane forest near a ridge on a steep Pacific-facing slope in southern Chiba.
