= Trypetheliopsis hirsuta =

Scientific classification
- Kingdom: Fungi
- Division: Ascomycota
- Class: Dothideomycetes
- Order: Monoblastiales
- Family: Monoblastiaceae
- Genus: Trypetheliopsis
- Species: T. hirsuta

Binomial name
- Trypetheliopsis hirsuta Weerakoon, Arachchige & Aptroot (2016)

Species of lichen-forming fungus

Trypetheliopsis hirsuta is a species of lichen-forming fungus in the family Monoblastiaceae. It grows on smooth tree bark in Sri Lankan rainforests and is distinguished by the dense covering of stiff black bristles on its spore-producing structures, a feature alluded to in its name. It is known only from its original collection site at Morningside, Sri Lanka.

== Taxonomy ==
Trypetheliopsis hirsuta was described as new to science in 2016 by Gothamie Weerakoon, Omal Arachchige and André Aptroot, as part of a broader survey of Sri Lankan lichen biodiversity. The species was based on material collected at Morningside, Sri Lanka, on 19 April 2015, where it was found growing on the bark of a tree. The authors placed the species in the tropical crustose lichen genus Trypetheliopsis, and at the time of description they regarded the genus as a small group of seven species mainly known from the tropics.

In their discussion of the new species, Weerakoon and co-authors noted that Trypetheliopsis had recently been resurrected by Kashiwadani and colleagues for a set of species long treated under the name Musaespora, and that T. hirsuta is morphologically most similar to T. kalbii and T. kassamensis. It differs from those species, however, in bearing campylidia that are clothed externally in conspicuous black bristles, a character the authors regarded as diagnostic for recognising T. hirsuta as a distinct species. The specific epithet "hirsuta" (Latin for 'hairy') refers to these conspicuous bristles.

== Description ==
Trypetheliopsis hirsuta forms a thin, smooth and shiny crust (thallus) on its bark substrate. The thallus is corticate and olive-grey in colour, continuous across the surface it covers, and is bordered by an opaque whitish prothallus. The associated photosynthetic partner (photobiont) is a trentepohlioid green alga, a filamentous alga typical of many tropical crustose lichens.

No sexual fruiting bodies (ascomata) were observed in the material examined; instead, the species is characterised by abundant campylidia, which are specialised spore-producing structures. These campylidia are black, glossy, ear-shaped and pointed, measuring about 0.4–0.9 mm in diameter and 0.5–1.2 mm in height. Their most distinctive feature is a dense covering of stiff black bristles on the outer surface, up to 140 μm long and about 35 μm thick. The campylidia produce colourless (hyaline), ellipsoid conidia with rounded ends, measuring 6–7 × 3–3.5 μm.

Standard chemical spot tests on the thallus are negative (UV−, C−, K−, KC−, P−), and thin-layer chromatography likewise failed to detect any lichen secondary metabolites in the species.

== Habitat and distribution ==
Trypetheliopsis hirsuta is a corticolous (bark-dwelling) species, occurring on smooth bark of trees in rainforest. The type collection from Morningside in Sri Lanka was made on tree bark during a 2015 field expedition targeting lichens in a range of forested habitats. The authors report the species only from Sri Lanka.
