= Anisomeridium robustum =

Scientific classification
- Kingdom: Fungi
- Division: Ascomycota
- Class: Dothideomycetes
- Order: Monoblastiales
- Family: Monoblastiaceae
- Genus: Anisomeridium
- Species: A. robustum

Binomial name
- Anisomeridium robustum Orange, Coppins & Aptroot (2008)

Species of lichen

Anisomeridium robustum is a species of corticolous (bark-dwelling) lichen in the family Monoblastiaceae. It is characterised by its distinctive black, rounded fruiting bodies that can be up to half a millimetre across and sometimes produce visible white strings of spores. The lichen grows in old woodlands and parks across western Britain and Ireland, and has more recently been discovered in South Korea and the Azores.

== Taxonomy ==
Anisomeridium robustum is a bark-dwelling lichen described in 2008 by Alan Orange, Brian J. Coppins, and André Aptroot during the preparation of the new edition of The Lichens of the British Isles. The holotype was collected in 1994 from Claonaig Wood, Kintyre, Scotland, where it was found growing on bryophytes on an oak tree. The species was established as distinct on account of its unusually large pycnidia (spore-producing structures) and conidia compared to related taxa, especially A. polypori. These differences place it securely within Anisomeridium (family Monoblastiaceae), though the authors note that it may prove close to or even congeneric with Caprettia, another tropical–subtropical genus.

== Description ==
The thallus of A. robustum is thin, pale grey to whitish, and often cracked, containing the orange alga Trentepohlia as its photosynthetic partner (photobiont). Sexual reproductive structures (ascomata) have not been seen. Instead, the species is recognised by its conspicuous asexual fruiting bodies (pycnidia). These appear as black, spherical (globose) to conical structures, 0.2–0.6 mm in diameter and up to 0.5 mm high, usually with a narrow neck that may extend to 1.5 mm. Conidia (asexual spores) are colourless, simple, pear-shaped to ellipsoid with a truncate base, measuring 4.5–6 × 2.5–3 micrometres (μm). They are sometimes extruded in masses, forming visible whitish strings (cirri) up to 20 μm wide. No microconidia have been detected. Standard chemical tests have shown no secondary metabolites (lichen products).

== Habitat and distribution ==
Anisomeridium robustum grows on the bark of mature broad-leaved trees, particularly sycamore (Acer pseudoplatanus), ash (Fraxinus), and oak (Quercus), but it can also occur on hazel (Corylus), willow (Salix), or over mosses on bark and rocks. It favours old woodland and parkland habitats and sometimes establishes on bryophyte mats covering tree trunks or boulders. Its European distribution is concentrated in western Britain, from Cornwall northwards to Wester Ross, with additional records from Ireland. In 2018, the known range of the lichen was extended considerably when it was recorded from Jeju Island in South Korea. A. robustum has also been found on Santa Maria Island in the Azores archipelago, growing on Metrosideros.
