= Trypetheliopsis =

Scientific classification
- Kingdom: Fungi
- Division: Ascomycota
- Class: Dothideomycetes
- Order: Monoblastiales
- Family: Monoblastiaceae
- Genus: Trypetheliopsis; Asahina (1937)

Type species
- Trypetheliopsis boninensis Asahina (1937)

Species
- See text

Synonyms
- Musaespora Aptroot & Sipman (1993)

Genus of lichen-forming fungi

Trypetheliopsis is a genus of lichen-forming fungi in the family Monoblastiaceae. It contains eight species. The genus grows as a thin crust on tree bark, typically in tropical and subtropical regions, and is recognised by its flask-shaped fruiting bodies that are embedded within raised, crusty structures on the lichen's surface. Species in this genus were largely forgotten by lichenologists for several decades until 2009, when researchers studying Japanese herbarium specimens "resurrected" the group by reclassifying several related lichens within it.

== Taxonomy ==
The genus Trypetheliopsis was introduced in 1937 by the Japanese lichenologist Yasuhiko Asahina for a distinctive bark-dwelling crustose lichen he named Trypetheliopsis boninensis, based on material from smooth tree trunks in the Bonin Islands of Japan. In his description he placed the genus in the family Trypetheliaceae and characterised it by a thin, crust-like thallus growing on or partly within the bark, a green algal partner of the chroolepoid type, and raised stromata that contain several pale perithecia (flask-shaped fruiting bodies) with a colourless hymenium and branched paraphyses. The sexual spores (ascospores) were described as narrow, spindle-shaped, yellowish and two-celled, with the upper cell longer than the lower, and Asahina also recorded minute ellipsoid asexual spores (conidia) formed in pycnidia scattered across the thallus; he further noted orange-red pigments in the internal tissues that turn deep red to violet in potassium hydroxide solution, which he interpreted as supporting the placement of Trypetheliopsis near but distinct from Trypethelium within the Trypetheliaceae.

In the following decades, the genus fell into disuse in lichenological literature. In 2009, following a study of numerous herbarium specimens of pyrenocarpous lichens collected in Japan, Kashiwadani and colleagues "resurrected" the genus and reclassified several species within it. They also determined that Musaespora, whose type species is Musaespora coccinea, was closely related to Trypetheliopsis, and established Musaespora as a synonym of that genus.

== Description ==
Trypetheliopsis can be identified by several distinctive microscopic features. The asci contain large, colourless ascospores that are divided by a single partition wall (septum). The fertile layer (hymenium) contains fine, net-like filaments (paraphysoids), and the genus also produces specialised structures called campylidia that generate rod-shaped asexual spores.

== Species ==
- Trypetheliopsis boninensis Asahina (1937) – Japan
- Trypetheliopsis coccinea (Aptroot & Sipman) Aptroot (2009)
- Trypetheliopsis epiphylla (R.Sant.) Aptroot (2009)
- Trypetheliopsis gigas (Zahlbr.) Aptroot (2009)
- Trypetheliopsis hirsuta Weerakoon, Arachchige & Aptroot (2016) – Sri Lanka
- Trypetheliopsis kalbii (Lücking & Sérus.) Aptroot (2009)
- Trypetheliopsis kassamensis (Sérus.) Aptroot (2009)
- Trypetheliopsis yoshimurae H.Harada (2017) – Japan
