= Trypetheliopsis gigas =

Scientific classification
- Kingdom: Fungi
- Division: Ascomycota
- Class: Dothideomycetes
- Order: Monoblastiales
- Family: Monoblastiaceae
- Genus: Trypetheliopsis
- Species: T. gigas

Binomial name
- Trypetheliopsis gigas (Zahlbr.) Aptroot (2009)

Synonyms
- Mycoporellum gigas Zahlbr. (1928); Musaespora gigas (Zahlbr.) R.C.Harris (1995); Musaespora corticola Aptroot & Sipman (1993)

Species of lichen-forming fungus

Trypetheliopsis gigas is a species of corticolous (bark-dwelling) crustose lichen in the family Monoblastiaceae. It forms a thin, grey-green crust with conspicuous black fruiting bodies on the bark of trees in tropical forests. The species is known from Java in Indonesia, Papua New Guinea and Sri Lanka. It was originally described in 1928 as Mycoporellum gigas and was later transferred to Musaespora before being placed in Trypetheliopsis following a 2009 re-evaluation of the group.

== Taxonomy ==
The species was first described by the Austrian lichenologist Alexander Zahlbruckner in 1928 as Mycoporellum gigas. The type material came from Java, collected by A. Seubert on the bark of trees near Pati, and was housed in the herbarium of botanist Ernst Stizenberger in Zürich. Zahlbruckner considered the lichen remarkable for its large apothecia and spores, and that it had been provisionally filed under the genus Pyrenula before he described it in Mycoporellum.

In 1993, Aptroot and Sipman introduced Musaespora as a genus of pyrenocarpous lichens with specialised campylidiate anamorphs, describing Musaespora corticola from bark of Eurya glabra in West Java as the type species. Richard C. Harris subsequently transferred Zahlbruckner's species to this genus as Musaespora gigas in his 1995 treatment of pyrenolichens in Florida, listing M. corticola on the same page and treating both species within Musaespora.

Further collecting in Papua New Guinea led Aptroot to regard Musaespora corticola as conspecific with Zahlbruckner's species; in an inventory of New Guinea lichens he reported Musaespora gigas (syn. M. corticola) from montane forest on twigs of Elaeocarpus at about 2,100 m altitude. In 2009, Kashiwadani, Aptroot and Moon re-examined Japanese pyrenocarpous lichens and "resurrected" Asahina's genus Trypetheliopsis, transferring several species into it and treating Musaespora as a synonym of Trypetheliopsis. As part of this revision they introduced the combination Trypetheliopsis gigas for Zahlbruckner's species, placing Musaespora gigas and its synonym M. corticola under that name.

== Description ==
Trypetheliopsis gigas forms a crustose thallus that spreads widely over the bark but remains thin, only about 0.1–0.2 mm thick. The thallus adheres closely to the substrate, is pale grey to olive-grey or olive-green, and has a mostly matt, smooth surface without soredia or isidia. In section the thallus has a pale, somewhat chalky appearance, and chemical tests on the thallus give only a very weak yellow reaction with potassium hydroxide solution (K), while the C and combined K+C reactions are negative. The margin may be bordered by a fine, dark brown to blackish line (a prothallus). The algal partner consists of filamentous green algae of the genus Trentepohlia, whose cells are joined in chains.

The lichen's most conspicuous structures are its numerous fruiting bodies (apothecia), which are scattered or somewhat crowded, closely attached to the thallus and roughly rounded, reaching about 1 mm in diameter. Externally they appear blackish to dark brown, convex and dull, without a whitish pruina. The upper surface is uneven, and each apothecium is pierced by a single round pore that is often slightly off-centre and rimmed by a narrow black ring. In vertical section the apothecium has a pale whitish interior, with the hymenial "nucleus" forming a low plano-convex mound containing several nearly spherical perithecial chambers (typically six to eight) separated by a dense mass of branched, almost colourless paraphyses. There are no internal columellae. The asci are thick-walled, each usually containing two large ascospores that take on a reddish tint in iodine solution.

The ascospores are colourless, smooth and broadly oblong to oval-ellipsoid, mostly straight or only slightly curved. They are divided into two cells by a thin cross wall that does not constrict the spore, the upper cell being about three times longer than the lower one. Individual spores measure about 80–100 × 20–24 micrometres (μm). No conidia or other asexual propagules were reported in the original description.

== Distribution ==
The species is based on material from Java, where Zahlbruckner's original collections came from bark of trees near Pati. Harris cited an isotype in the United States National Herbarium (US) from the same region when making the combination Musaespora gigas. Aptroot and Sipman's type of Musaespora corticola, later regarded as a synonym, also came from bark in West Java, on Eurya glabra.

Aptroot later recorded the species (as Musaespora gigas) from Papua New Guinea, on twigs of Elaeocarpus in primary montane forest at around 2,100 m elevation, treating it as a new record for the country and referring to Zahlbruckner's Javanese material and the type of M. corticola under the same taxon. A more recent survey of tropical microlichens listed Trypetheliopsis gigas as new to Papua New Guinea based on material from lowland forest in the Balek Wildlife Reserve near Madang. The species has also been reported from Sri Lanka, where it was recorded as a new addition to the lichen flora of the Indian subcontinent.
