= Trypetheliopsis boninensis =

Scientific classification
- Kingdom: Fungi
- Division: Ascomycota
- Class: Dothideomycetes
- Order: Monoblastiales
- Family: Monoblastiaceae
- Genus: Trypetheliopsis
- Species: T. boninensis

Binomial name
- Trypetheliopsis boninensis Asahina (1937)

Species of lichen-forming fungus

Trypetheliopsis boninensis is a species of corticolous (bark-dwelling) crustose lichen in the family Monoblastiaceae. It forms a thin, greenish crust on tree bark and is characterised by small, reddish bumps containing the lichen's spore-producing structures. Originally described in 1937 from the Bonin Islands of Japan, where it was found growing on the Bonin-endemic tree Boninia glabra, the lichen was later recorded from Kyushu in southern Japan. The species served as the type for the genus Trypetheliopsis when Japanese lichenologist Yasuhiko Asahina established it as a new genus of pyrenocarpous lichens.

== Taxonomy ==
Japanese lichenologist Yasuhiko Asahina described Trypetheliopsis boninensis in 1937 when he established Trypetheliopsis as a new genus of pyrenocarpous lichens. On the basis of several morphological features, he placed Trypetheliopsis in the family Trypetheliaceae, close to Trypethelium but distinct from it, with T. boninensis as the only species then recognised and therefore the type species of the genus. Asahina based the species on material collected by M. Okabe on the smooth bark of Boninia glabra in the Ogasawara (Bonin) Islands, Japan, on 13 January 1937, and stated that the type specimen was preserved in his own herbarium.

In a 2009 study of pyrenocarpous lichens from Japan, Hiro Kashiwadani and co-authors resurrected Asahina's genus, re-examined his original material of T. boninensis, and broadened Trypetheliopsis to include several species that had been placed in other genera, including the type species of Musaespora, which they treated as a synonym of Trypetheliopsis. Modern catalogues and classifications follow this treatment, listing Trypetheliopsis – and hence T. boninensis – in the family Monoblastiaceae rather than Trypetheliaceae.

== Description ==
In the protologue Asahina described Trypetheliopsis boninensis as forming a thin, greenish, smooth crust on the bark of its host tree, partly immersed in the outer bark tissues. The thallus contains a chroolepoid (Trentepohlia-like) photobiont and bears scattered, slightly raised, reddish stromata that each contain several immersed, pale perithecia. The perithecial wall is darkened externally, enclosing a colourless hymenium with branched paraphyses and asci that produce large, thick-walled ascospores. These ascospores are spindle-shaped, yellowish, divided by a single septum and distinctly unequal, with the upper cell longer than the lower. Asahina also recorded small, dark pycnidia dispersed across the thallus surface that release minute, colourless, ellipsoid conidia, and he reported orange–red pigments in the medulla and stromata that produce a deep red to violet colour reaction when treated with potassium hydroxide.

In 1970, Johan Santesson reported that the lichen contains the anthraquinonoid pigments skyrin, oxyskyrin and skyrinol.

== Habitat and distribution ==
In his original description, Asahina reported Trypetheliopsis boninensis as a corticolous lichen growing on the bark of the Bonin-endemic tree Boninia glabra in the Ogasawara (Bonin) Islands of Japan. The type material was collected by M. Okabe on smooth tree trunks in the Bonin Islands on 13 January 1937, and Asahina gave no records of the species from outside this island group. It has since been collected more widely in the Japanese islands. More recently (2021), it was reported growing on the bark of Castanopsis sieboldii on the banks of the Ōhira River at Ōhira, Kushima, Miyazaki, in Kyushu.
