= Anisomeridium lateriticum =

Scientific classification
- Kingdom: Fungi
- Division: Ascomycota
- Class: Dothideomycetes
- Order: Monoblastiales
- Family: Monoblastiaceae
- Genus: Anisomeridium
- Species: A. lateriticum

Binomial name
- Anisomeridium lateriticum Aptroot & M.Cáceres (2013)

Species of lichen-forming fungus

Anisomeridium lateriticum is a species of saxicolous (rock-dwelling) lichen in the family Monoblastiaceae. Found in Brazil, it was formally described as a new species in 2013 by lichenologists André Aptroot and Marcela Cáceres. The type specimen was collected by the authors in Fazenda São Francisco north of Porto Velho (Rondônia), where it was found growing on lateritic rock in a primary rainforest.

== Description ==
The lichen is inconspicuous, with a brownish-grey color and a very thin and glossy thallus. The algae are trentepohlioid. Ascomata were not observed during the study. However, the lichen has sessile pycnidia that are pyriform and black, measuring approximately 0.1 mm wide and 0.2 mm high. The ostiole has partly brown and partly hyaline septate setae that measure between 20 and 100 by 4 to 6 μm. The conidia are hyaline and bacillary, ranging from simple to 1-septate, and measure between 8 and 11 by 2.0 to 2.5 μm. They often have additional pseudosepta or oil globules.

No lichen products were detected in Anisomeridium lateriticum.

== See also ==
- List of lichens of Brazil
