= Megalotremis lateralis =

Scientific classification
- Kingdom: Fungi
- Division: Ascomycota
- Class: Dothideomycetes
- Order: Monoblastiales
- Family: Monoblastiaceae
- Genus: Megalotremis
- Species: M. lateralis

Binomial name
- Megalotremis lateralis Aptroot (2008)

Species of lichen-forming fungus

Megalotremis lateralis is a species of corticolous (bark-dwelling), crustose lichen in the genus Megalotremis. It was described as a new species in 2008, based on material collected in the Jairo Mora Sandoval Gandoca-Manzanillo Mixed Wildlife Refuge (Manzanillo section) in Limón Province, Costa Rica; it has since been recorded in Sri Lanka. The lichen forms glossy, pale mineral-gray crusts that can spread over patches at least 5 cm (2 in) across and may be edged by a thin black border. Its black, hemispherical fruiting bodies have an off-centre opening, and chemical tests did not detect any lichen substances.

== Taxonomy ==
It was described as a new species by the lichenologist André Aptroot, based on material collected in the Jairo Mora Sandoval Gandoca-Manzanillo Mixed Wildlife Refuge (Manzanillo section) in Limón Province, Costa Rica. The type was found in a lowland moist forest zone at about 1 m (3 ft 3 in) elevation, growing on scattered coconut trunks.

== Description ==
The lichen forms a glossy, pale mineral-gray thallus (the main lichen body) that can spread over at least 5 cm (2.0 in). Its edge is outlined by a narrow black band of hypothallus (a dark marginal zone of fungal tissue) up to 0.2 mm wide. The photosynthetic partner is a Trentepohlia-type green alga, with cells up to 10 × 6 μm.

Its black perithecia (flask-shaped fruiting bodies) are emergent from the thallus as hemispherical to slightly elliptical bumps, about 0.5–0.9 mm across, and are partly covered on the sides by thallus tissue. Each perithecium opens by a black, eccentrically placed ostiole (opening), and the perithecial wall is darkened (carbonized) and 50–100 μm thick. Inside, the clear (hyaline) tissue between the asci (the hamathecium) has no oily granules (not inspersed), does not change in an iodine test (IKI–), and is made of fine threads that often join into a net-like mesh (anastomosing).

The asci lack an ocular chamber and each contains eight colorless ascospores. The spores have a single septum placed well off-centre, so the upper cell is much broader than the lower; they measure 45–60 × 17–25 μm and are constricted at the septum. The spore wall is about 2–3 μm thick, the internal compartments (lumina) are slightly rounded near the septum, and the outer surface bears low warts about 1 × 2 μm. Asexual reproductive structures (conidiomata) were not observed, and no lichen substances were detected.

== Habitat and distribution ==
In the original description, M. lateralis was separated from other members of the genus mainly by its lateral (eccentric) ostioles. Similar-looking perithecia occur in Megalotremis biocellata and Megalotremis verrucosa, but those species have only 2–4 spores per ascus and a more symmetrical septum. The occurrence of M. lateralis on coastal palms was also described as unusual for the genus, which is otherwise generally restricted to wet forest habitats. In 2014, it was reported from Sri Lanka, its first Asian occurrence.
