= Trypetheliopsis epiphylla =

Scientific classification
- Kingdom: Fungi
- Division: Ascomycota
- Class: Dothideomycetes
- Order: Monoblastiales
- Family: Monoblastiaceae
- Genus: Trypetheliopsis
- Species: T. epiphylla

Binomial name
- Trypetheliopsis epiphylla (R.Sant.) Aptroot (2009)

Synonyms
- Astrothelium epiphyllum R.Sant. (1952); Musaespora epiphylla (R.Sant.) R.C.Harris (1995); Musaespora multilocularis Aptroot & Sipman (1993)

Species of lichen-forming fungus

Trypetheliopsis epiphylla is a species of foliicolous (leaf-dwelling) crustose lichen in the family Monoblastiaceae. It grows on the surface of living leaves in tropical rainforests of Southeast Asia and New Guinea. The lichen forms small, pale greenish crusts with clustered fruiting bodies that contain multiple internal chambers, each producing elongated ascospores. It was originally described from Sumatra in 1952 and has undergone several name changes as its classification was refined.

== Taxonomy ==
The lichen was originally described by Rolf Santesson in 1952, as Astrothelium epiphyllum. The type specimen was collected in 1926 near Besitang on the east coast of Sumatra, close to the boundary with Aceh, at about 30 m elevation, and is held in the Uppsala herbarium (UPS). Richard C. Harris transferred the species to Musaespora in 1995, publishing the new combination Musaespora epiphylla as part of a broader discussion of the genus and its family placement. In that work he noted that Aptroot and Sipman had placed Musaespora in the Aspidotheliaceae, which he treated as equivalent to the Thelenellaceae), but argued that the ascus structure did not agree with that family and that Musaespora was better assigned to the Monoblastiaceae. Harris also pointed out that several corticate species then being kept in Anisomeridium, as well as an apparently undescribed corticolous species with campylidia from Costa Rica, might ultimately belong in Musaespora, while emphasising that he was not convinced a campylidiate anamorph on its own should determine generic status.

In 1993, Aptroot and Sipman introduced Musaespora as a separate genus for pyrenocarpous lichens with campylidia, describing several new species including Musaespora multilocularis from foliicolous (leaf-dwelling) material collected in Papua New Guinea. In a later re-evaluation of this group, Kashiwadani, Aptroot and Moon studied numerous herbarium specimens of pyrenocarpous lichens from Japan and neighbouring regions and in 2009 "resurrected" Asahina's genus Trypetheliopsis, transferring a suite of species into it and treating Musaespora as a synonym of Trypetheliopsis. As part of this revision they regarded Musaespora multilocularis as conspecific with Santesson's Astrothelium epiphyllum and placed the combined taxon in Trypetheliopsis under the name Trypetheliopsis epiphylla.

== Description ==
Trypetheliopsis epiphylla forms small, thin thalli 3–5 mm across that are straw-green, smooth and rather inconspicuous on the substrate. The sexual fruiting bodies are grouped into slightly depressed, wart-like swellings about 1–1.5 mm wide that are externally the same straw-green colour as the surrounding thallus, but become somewhat straw-brown around the tiny pore-like openings. Inside each of these warts there are about 3–10 perithecial chambers, arranged more or less radially and around 0.2 mm in diameter, with pale walls; these chambers house the spore-producing tissue. The hymenial gel is colourless and does not react with iodine, and the asci are large, about 220 × 36 micrometres (μm). The ascospores are smooth-walled, very elongate ellipsoids measuring 75–100 × 14–20 μm. Campylidia (small, asexual fruiting structures) are rare; when present they form grey, roughly shell-shaped structures about 1 mm high, but the conidia were not observed and therefore remain unknown.

== Distribution ==
In addition to the type locality in Sumatra, the documented presence in Papua New Guinea (as the synonym Musaespora multilocularis), Trypetheliopsis epiphylla has also been recorded in Vietnam.
