= Trypetheliopsis kalbii =

Scientific classification
- Kingdom: Fungi
- Division: Ascomycota
- Class: Dothideomycetes
- Order: Monoblastiales
- Family: Monoblastiaceae
- Genus: Trypetheliopsis
- Species: T. kalbii

Binomial name
- Trypetheliopsis kalbii (Lücking & Sérus.) Aptroot (2009)

Synonyms
- Musaespora kalbii Lücking & Sérus. (1996)

Species of lichen-forming fungus

Trypetheliopsis kalbii is a species of foliicolous (leaf-dwelling) crustose lichen in the family Monoblastiaceae. The species was first described in 1996 as Musaespora kalbii by Robert Lücking and Emmanuël Sérusiaux, and was transferred to Trypetheliopsis in 2009 when that genus was revived to include Musaespora as a synonym. It forms thin, slightly shiny greyish-bronze patches on leaf surfaces, typically 10–30 mm across, and produces small wart-like fruiting bodies along with distinctive hood-shaped structures that release asexual spores. The lichen has a pantropical distribution, recorded from Costa Rica, French Guiana, the West Indies, Madagascar, Papua New Guinea, Guyana, Mexico, and Queensland, Australia. It grows on living leaves in tropical rainforests, favouring semi-open microhabitats such as light gaps and forest edges at elevations from sea level to about 2,500 metres, though most frequently between 500 and 1,500 metres.

== Taxonomy ==
Trypetheliopsis kalbii was first formally described in 1996 by Robert Lücking and Emmanuël Sérusiaux as Musaespora kalbii, a new leaf-dwelling lichen assigned to the pyrenocarpous genus Musaespora. The type specimen was collected by Lücking in primary submontane rainforest in Braulio Carrillo National Park, Limón Province, Costa Rica, along the Botarrama trail near the Río Sucio at about 480 m elevation, on the surface of living leaves. The specific epithet kalbii honours German lichenologist Klaus Kalb, in recognition of his extensive contributions to the study of tropical lichens. In describing the foliicolous lichen Anisomeridium musaesporoides, Javier Etayo and Lücking drew attention to its external similarity to Musaespora kalbii and other Musaespora species, and regarded Musaespora as closely related to Anisomeridium but differing in its larger ascospores and campylidia-like conidiomata.

In 2009, following a study of numerous herbarium specimens of Japanese pyrenocarpous lichens, Kashiwadani, Aptroot and Moon "resurrected" Asahina's genus Trypetheliopsis, transferring several species into it and treating Musaespora as a synonym of Trypetheliopsis. As part of this revision Aptroot proposed the new combination Trypetheliopsis kalbii for Lücking and Sérusiaux's species.

== Description ==
Trypetheliopsis kalbii forms thin, smooth patches on the surface of living leaves. The lichen body (thallus) is greyish bronze and slightly shiny, often with a faint metallic sheen, and typically covers areas about 10–30 mm across. It is very thin, only about 10–20 μm thick, with a delicate, cortex-like outer layer of tightly glued, colourless fungal threads. Around the edge there is often a narrow, membranous fungal border (prothallus) up to 0.5 mm wide that appears pale but can look darker where the leaf tissue shows through. The green algal partner (photobiont) is a trentepohlioid alga with angular to rounded cells arranged in irregular, branching strands beneath the fungal cortex.

The sexual reproductive structures are flask-shaped fruiting bodies (perithecia) immersed in the thallus but breaking through as small, wart-like bumps 0.3–0.6 mm in diameter. They are dark brown to almost black at the top, with paler yellowish to greyish-brown sides where they are covered by a thin layer of thallus tissue that often splits into four or five triangular flaps around the opening. Internally, the perithecia have a relatively thin outer wall and a colourless inner wall made of densely packed fungal tissue, with very slender, branched filaments (paraphysoids) filling the cavity. The asci are bitunicate (double-walled) and oblong to ellipsoid, each containing eight large ascospores. The spores are colourless, thick-walled, narrowly ellipsoid and mostly straight or only slightly curved, with a single cross wall, measuring about 60–85 (occasionally up to 130) × 12–20 μm; they sometimes break into two halves and their contents are coated with tiny crystals visible under polarised light.

In addition to perithecia, T. kalbii produces distinctive asexual structures called campylidia, which function as conidia-producing organs. Each campylidium has a basal wart-like portion that contains an internal cavity lined almost completely with conidiogenous tissue, and an apical ear- or helmet-shaped lobe that forms a hood over the opening. The basal part is about 0.25–0.35 mm across and the projecting lobe can reach about 0.5 mm in height; externally these structures are dark brown to blackish and often show faint longitudinal striations. The narrow opening is lined by rather long, simple or slightly branched hyphae and leads into the cavity beneath the hood. The conidia are produced in large numbers, filling both the basal chamber and the space under the lobe; they are simple, ellipsoid to drop-shaped, 5–8 × 2.5–3.5 μm, and are held together in a colourless, gelatinous mass.

== Habitat and distribution ==
Trypetheliopsis kalbii is a leaf-dwelling lichen with a pantropical range. In the original material it is recorded from widely separated regions—Costa Rica, French Guiana, the West Indies, Madagascar and Papua New Guinea—which the authors took to indicate a broad tropical distribution, with the species probably also occurring in other, as yet unsurveyed, areas. Its known range has since been extended by reports from Guyana in 1997, Queensland, Australia, in 2001, and Mexico in 2004.

The lichen has so far been found exclusively on living leaves. Collections span lowland to montane sites between about 0 and 2,500 m elevation, but it is most frequently encountered at intermediate heights of roughly 500–1,500 m. It tends to occupy semi-open microhabitats such as small natural light gaps in otherwise intact rainforest, forest margins and various types of disturbed vegetation, and has also been reported from the forest canopy. In these settings it commonly grows together with other pyrenocarpous leaf lichens, particularly species of Aspidothelium and Phyllobathelium.

In a quantitative analysis of foliicolous lichen communities at the Botarrama trail in Costa Rica, Robert Lücking grouped the species with other light-gap specialists, occurring in semi-exposed rainforest microsites with relatively higher light levels compared with the shaded understorey.
