= Anisomeridium globosum =

Scientific classification
- Kingdom: Fungi
- Division: Ascomycota
- Class: Dothideomycetes
- Order: Monoblastiales
- Family: Monoblastiaceae
- Genus: Anisomeridium
- Species: A. globosum

Binomial name
- Anisomeridium globosum Aptroot D.S.Andrade & M.Cáceres (2014)
- Type locality: Refúgio de vida silvestre, Sergipe, Brazil

Species of lichen-forming fungus

Anisomeridium globosum is a species of corticolous (bark-dwelling), crustose lichen in the family Monoblastiaceae. This species is characterised by its greyish-green thallus and its almost globose (spherical) ascomata (fruiting bodies). The ascospores are 1-septate, meaning they are divided into two sections, and measure 8–10.5 μm by 4.5–6 μm. The septum (dividing wall) is distinctly submedian, such that the lower cell is only about a quarter of the size of the upper cell.

The type specimen of Anisomeridium globosum was collected from the Refúgio de Vida Silvestre Mata do Junco in Capela, Sergipe, Brazil, at an elevation of about 150 m (490 ft). The thallus is thin, shiny, and greyish-green, surrounded by an irregular white prothallus (a border around the thallus) about 1 mm wide. The ascomata are almost globose (more or less spherical), 0.3–0.45 mm in diameter, and superficial (situated on the surface) in the bark but completely covered by a thin layer of thallus. The walls of the ascomata are carbonised (blackened) all around. The ostioles (openings) are apical (at the top), black, and protrude through the thallus. The hamathecium, the tissue between the asci, does not contain oil droplets, and its filaments interconnect above the asci. The asci are cylindrical, measuring 80–95 μm by 5.5–7.5 μm, and have a small ocular chamber. The ascospores are hyaline (translucent), uniseriate (arranged in a single row), with a pointed lower end and a rounded upper end. Pycnidia (small asexual fruiting bodies) have not been observed. Chemically, the thallus does not fluoresce under ultraviolet light, and no substances were detected using thin-layer chromatography.

Anisomeridium globosum is found on smooth bark in undisturbed Atlantic rainforests and is only known to occur in Brazil. This species is notable within its genus for having a corticate (having a cortex or outer layer) thallus, which is relatively rare. Other species with a corticate thallus tend to have larger ascospores and differ in other key characteristics.

== See also ==
- List of lichens of Brazil
