= Megalotremis cylindrica =

Scientific classification
- Kingdom: Fungi
- Division: Ascomycota
- Class: Dothideomycetes
- Order: Monoblastiales
- Family: Monoblastiaceae
- Genus: Megalotremis
- Species: M. cylindrica

Binomial name
- Megalotremis cylindrica Weerakoon & Aptroot (2016)

Species of lichen

Megalotremis cylindrica is a species of corticolous (bark-dwelling), crustose lichen in the family Monoblastiaceae. It was described as a new species in 2016 based on a specimen collected from the Sinharaja Forest Reserve in Sri Lanka. The species is characterized by its unique pycnidia and absence of ascomata.

== Taxonomy ==
Megalotremis cylindrica was described in 2016 by the lichenologists Gothamie Weerakoon and André Aptroot. The species is only known from its pycnidia, which are so characteristic that they warranted the description of a new species. It is closely related to the Neotropical species Megalotremis flavovulcanus, differing mainly in the shape of the pycnidia.

== Description ==
The thallus of Megalotremis cylindrica is corticate, smooth to granular, dull, continuous, thin, and olive grey in colour. It lacks a surrounding prothallus. The pycnidia of this species are abundant, cylindrical with a widened base, and curved to one side. They are approximately 0.1 mm thick and 0.2–0.4 mm high. The base of the pycnidia is covered by the thallus, while the remainder is pale citrine yellow. The conidia are hyaline, ellipsoid, and measure 5.5–7 by 3–3.5 μm with rather pointed ends.

Chemical spot tests (UV, C, K, KC, Pd) on the thallus are all negative, and thin-layer chromatography did not detect any substances.

== Habitat and distribution ==
This species has been found growing on tree bark in the wet lowland tropical rainforest of Sinharaja, Sri Lanka. At the time of its publication, it was only known to occur at the type locality.
