= Caprettia lichexanthotricha =

Scientific classification
- Kingdom: Fungi
- Division: Ascomycota
- Class: Dothideomycetes
- Order: Monoblastiales
- Family: Monoblastiaceae
- Genus: Caprettia
- Species: C. lichexanthotricha

Binomial name
- Caprettia lichexanthotricha Aptroot & M.F.Souza (2021)

Species of lichen

Caprettia lichexanthotricha is a species of lichen in the family Monoblastiaceae. Found in Brazil, it was formally described as a new species in 2021 by lichenologists André Aptroot and Maria Fernanda de Souza. The type specimen was collected by the authors from Tagaçaba (Guaraqueçaba, Paraná); here the lichen was found growing on tree bark. It has a dull, pale greenish-grey thallus that covers an area up to 10 cm (4 in). The photobiont partner of the lichen is trentepohloid, and in some parts of the thallus the resident algae partly escape and become filamentous. The thallus fluoresces a patchy yellow when shone with a UV light, due to the presence of lichexanthone, a secondary chemical for which the lichen is named. Caprettia lichexanthotricha is the only species in genus Caprettia that has lichexanthone.
