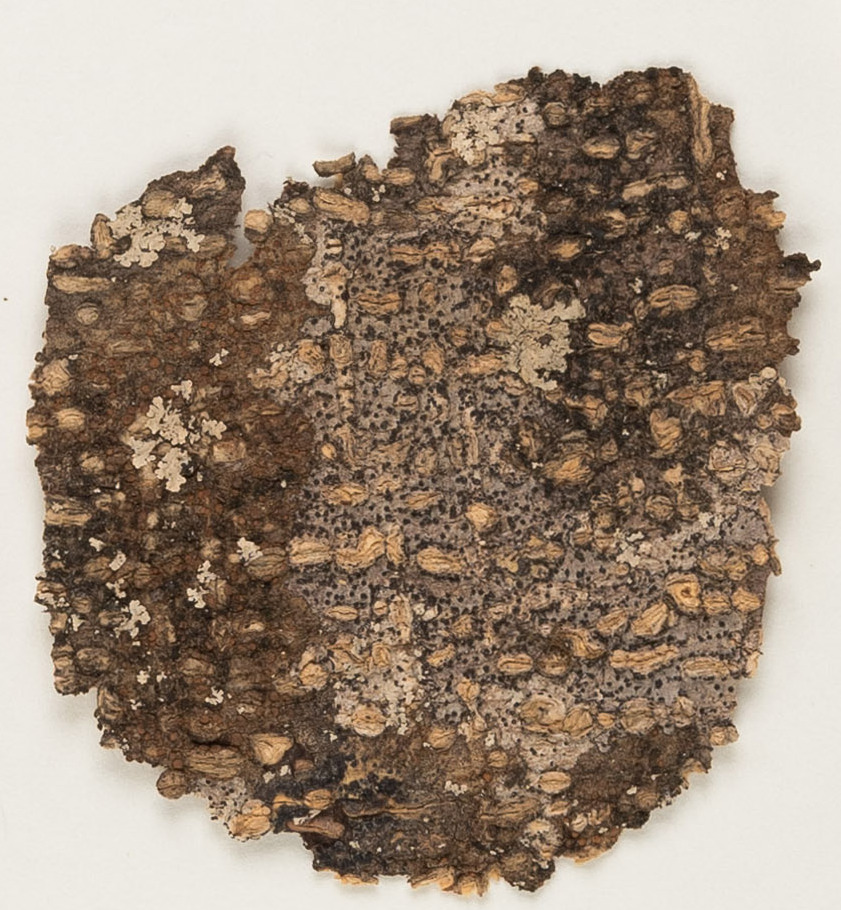
- Anisomeridium anisolobum on bark. Herbarium specimen collected from Guyana in the New York Botanical Garden

Scientific classification
- Kingdom: Fungi
- Division: Ascomycota
- Class: Dothideomycetes
- Order: Monoblastiales
- Family: Monoblastiaceae
- Genus: Anisomeridium
- Species: A. anisolobum

Binomial name
- Anisomeridium anisolobum (Müll. Arg.) Aptroot, 1995

Synonyms
- Synonymy: Arthopyrenia anisoloba Müll.; Ditremis anisoloba (Müll. Arg.) R.C. Harris

= Anisomeridium anisolobum =

Species of lichen

Anisomeridium anisolobum is a species of lichen in the family Monoblastiaceae. It has a pantropical distribution, and was formally described by Johannes Müller Argoviensis in 1883.

== Description ==
Anisomeridium anisolobum has a white to grey thallus. The species can be differentiated from Anisomeridium subatomarium due to its larger perithecia which is not immersed in the substrate (0.25–0.5 mm (0.0098–0.0197 in) compared to 0.2 mm (0.0079 in) for A. subatomarium), and from Anisomeridium biforme by having a clearly sub-median septum.

== Taxonomy ==
The species was first described by Johannes Müller Argoviensis in 1883, under the name Arthopyrenia anisoloba. It was recombined in 1995 and placed in the genus Anisomeridium by André Aptroot.

== Distribution ==
The species has a pantropical distribution, and was first identified as occurring in New Zealand in 2016, from a specimen collected from Dingle Dell in St Heliers, Auckland, New Zealand.
