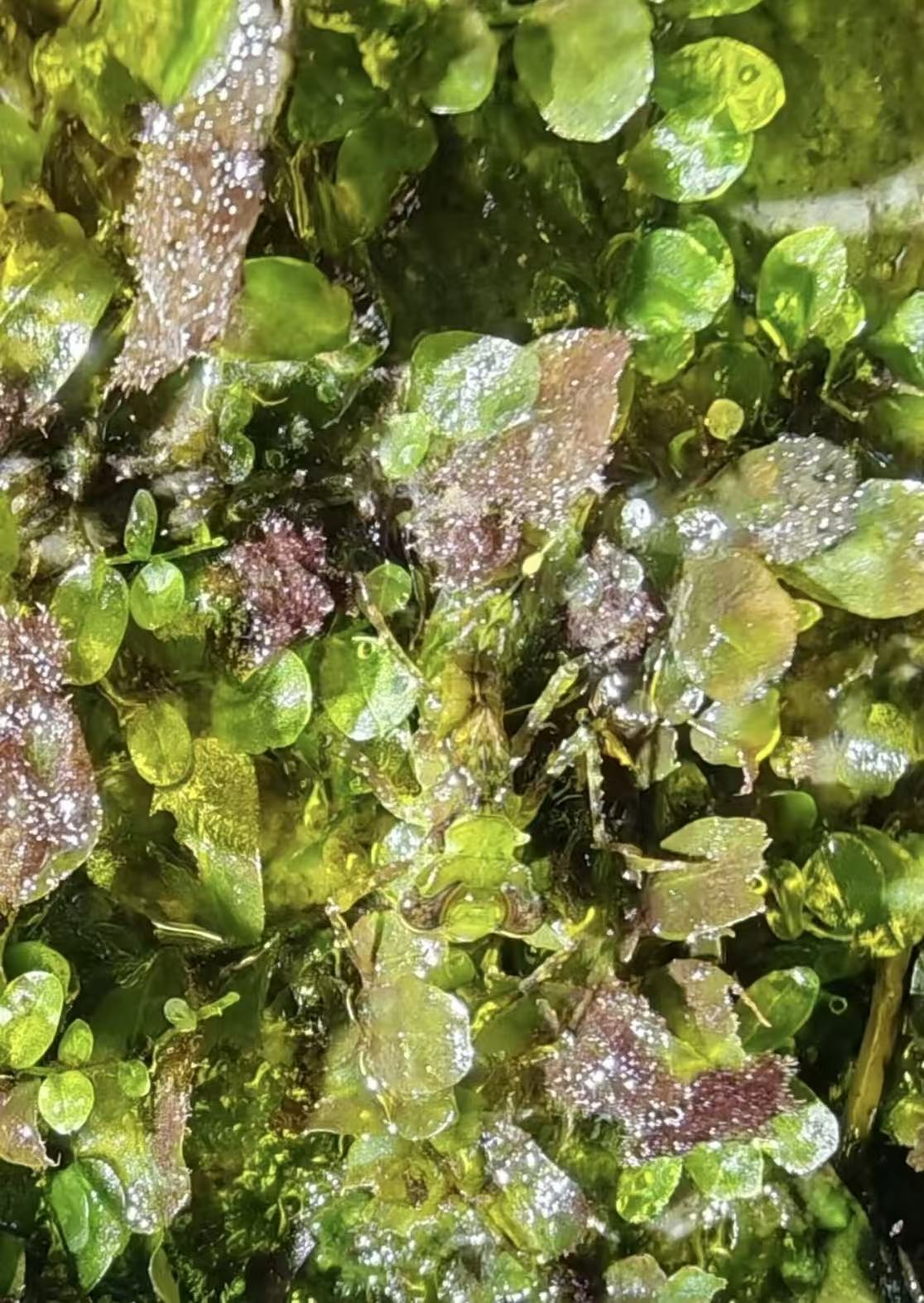

Conservation status
- Least Concern (IUCN 3.1)

Scientific classification
- Kingdom: Animalia
- Phylum: Arthropoda
- Class: Insecta
- Order: Odonata
- Infraorder: Anisoptera
- Family: Aeshnidae
- Genus: Cephalaeschna
- Species: C. klotsae

Binomial name
- Cephalaeschna klotsae Asahina, 1982
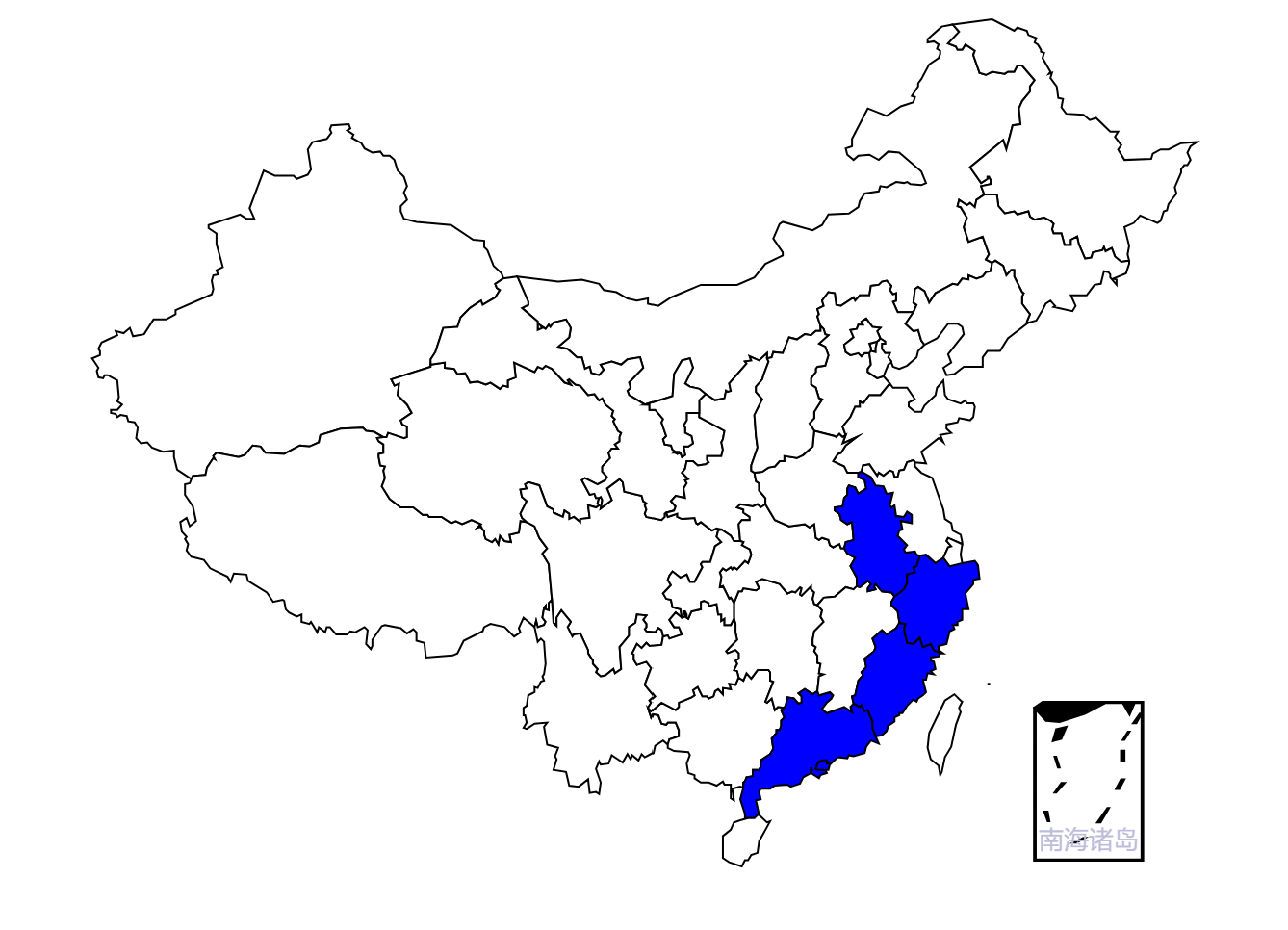
- The distribution of Cephalaeschna klotsae

= Cephalaeschna klotsae =

Species of dragonfly

Cephalaeschna klotsae, also known as yellow-spotted dusk-hawker, is a dragonfly species in the family Aeshnidae described by odonatologist Syoziro Asahina in 1982. It is an endemic species of China, specifically distribute in Hubei, Guangdong, Hong Kong, Zhejiang, Fujian and Anhui.

== Description ==
The body length of this dragonfly species is around 70~77 mm, the abdomen length is 54~61 mm and the length of their hindwings is around 46~49 mm. This species does not have significant sexual dimorphism, they have olive green colored compound eyes with dark brownish faces, their legs are black, thorax is black with 2 pairs of light green strips on each side and 1 pair on the front, wings are transparent, abdomen is black with parallel light green strip-like spots on 1st~8th segment; color of females is lighter and their ovipositors are comparatively less developed. The naiad has inverted trapezoidal head with pumped out compound eyes.

== Biology ==
The species dwelling in elevation around 300~2000 in mountains; Cephalaeschna klotsae 's naiads live in a semi-aquatic environment, that means they can move, capture prey, and molt on land, mainly in mosses and ferns surround little waterfalls and seepage stone walls and naiads are highly camouflaged. The adults are diurnal hunters that are active near the breeding site, preying on small insects, the species' flight season is from May to October.

== Natural history ==
The phylogyny of genus Cephalaechna is poorly studied. However, from morphology perspective, the naiad of Cephalaechna is very similar to genus Planaeschna. An article written in 2002 also suggests that Cephalaechna is the sister group of genus Caliaeschna.

== Conservation status ==
Yellow-spotted Dusk-hawker Cephalaeschna klotsae has most recently been assessed for The IUCN Red List of Threatened Species in 2020. Cephalaeschna klotsae is listed as Least Concern, the assess date is 26 November 2020.
