= Trypetheliopsis coccinea =

Scientific classification
- Kingdom: Fungi
- Division: Ascomycota
- Class: Dothideomycetes
- Order: Monoblastiales
- Family: Monoblastiaceae
- Genus: Trypetheliopsis
- Species: T. coccinea

Binomial name
- Trypetheliopsis coccinea (Aptroot & Sipman) Aptroot (2009)

Synonyms
- Musaespora coccinea Aptroot & Sipman (1993)

Species of lichen-forming fungus

Trypetheliopsis coccinea is a species of foliicolous (leaf-dwelling) crustose lichen in the family Trypetheliaceae. Originally described in 1993 as Musaespora coccinea, it was transferred to Trypetheliopsis in 2009 when that genus was resurrected and Musaespora was treated as its synonym. The lichen is highly distinctive, forming tiny greenish-grey patches densely covered with bright red warts and producing vivid orange-red, shell-shaped asexual structures called campylidia. Known only from a small area of lowland rainforest in Madang Province, Papua New Guinea, it grows on the leaves of understorey plants in shaded forest conditions.

== Taxonomy ==
Trypetheliopsis coccinea was originally described in 1993 by André Aptroot and Harrie Sipman as Musaespora coccinea, based on foliicolous material collected in lowland rainforest in Madang Province, Papua New Guinea. In the same paper they introduced Musaespora as a new genus of pyrenocarpous lichens with campylidia, characterised by perithecioid fruiting bodies, large, slightly curved one-septate ascospores, and a green algal partner resembling Cephaleuros. The species M. corticola was designated as the type of the genus, while M. coccinea represented one of its foliicolous species distinguished by its bright red thallus warts and campylidia. Aptroot and Sipman placed Musaespora in the family Aspidotheliaceae, which at that time was regarded as having an uncertain position among bitunicate ascomycetes.

Subsequent authors made little use of Musaespora in the decades that followed, and the genus largely disappeared from routine lichenological treatments. In 2009, however, Kashiwadani and colleagues re-examined a wide set of herbarium specimens of pyrenocarpous lichens from Japan and related regions, using comparative morphology to reassess generic limits within this group. They reinstated the previously neglected genus Trypetheliopsis and transferred several species into it. On the basis of anatomical features and overall morphology, they concluded that Musaespora and Trypetheliopsis represented the same genus, treated Musaespora as a synonym of Trypetheliopsis, and made the new combination Trypetheliopsis coccinea for Aptroot and Sipman's species. This reclassification moved the species from Aspidotheliaceae into the family Trypetheliaceae, aligning it with other foliicolous and corticolous (bark-dwelling) pyrenocarpous lichens now placed in Trypetheliopsis.

== Description ==
Trypetheliopsis coccinea forms very small patches on leaf surfaces, each thallus only about 1–2 mm across. The vegetative thallus is a thin, almost varnish-like film that appears greenish grey and slightly glossy. It is densely sprinkled with minute, rounded wart-like bumps about 0.1 mm in diameter that are bright red when fresh. Most of the internal white medulla is either extremely thin or absent, and is essentially confined to these warts, where it is filled with an orange-red pigment and abundant microscopic crystals, probably of calcium oxalate. In chemical spot tests this pigment turns a dark purplish colour in potassium hydroxide, behaviour consistent with an anthraquinone compound.

The sexual reproductive structures are embedded in larger, roughly 1 mm wide warts that are often exposed as orange-red spots where the outer cortex has worn away. Within each wart sits a single spherical perithecium, about 0.5 mm across, with a pale wall and faint radiating ribs. The internal gel surrounding the asci is clear and does not react with iodine. The asci themselves are relatively large (around 180 × 50 μm) and thick-walled, with a distinct rounded chamber at the tip. They contain eight colourless ascospores that are elongated and slightly curved, with a single cross-wall, measuring roughly 75–120 × 12–20 μm. The spore walls are somewhat thickened at the ends and have a finely warted surface when seen under high magnification.

In addition to its perithecia, T. coccinea produces striking campylidia—specialised asexual structures that are among the most distinctive features of the species. Each campylidium consists of a short black stalk seated on a red thallus wart that contains a spherical chamber packed with conidia, and an expanded shell-shaped upper part about 1 mm wide and high. The shell is vividly orange-red and shows fine radial striations from the base towards the margin. Inside the basal chamber, simple, thick-walled conidia are produced on the inner surface; these are spindle-shaped with rounded ends and measure about 7–8 × 4 μm. The combination of a thin greenish thallus, prominent red warts, large curved ascospores and bright red, shell-like campylidia makes the species very distinctive in the field, even under a hand lens.

== Habitat and distribution ==
Trypetheliopsis coccinea is known only from lowland tropical rainforest in Madang Province, Papua New Guinea. All recorded material was collected in a small remnant of forest left standing within a logging concession about 30 km north of Madang, at an elevation of around 25 m above sea level. Within this site it grows on the leaves of various understorey flowering plants, forming tiny patches on the smooth leaf surfaces in the shaded forest undergrowth. The species appears to have been locally frequent where it occurred, with several collections made from the same fragment of forest. However, it had not been reported from outside this logged area at the time of its description, so its wider distribution remains uncertain and may reflect both its genuinely restricted range and the limited survey work on leaf-dwelling lichens in comparable habitats.
