= Highlands Highway =

Main land highway in Papua New Guinea

Route information
- Length: 890 km (550 mi)
- Existed: 1950s–present

Major junctions
- East end: Lae
- West end: Tari, Porgera

Location
- Country: Papua New Guinea
- Major cities: Kainantu, Goroka, Mount Hagen, Mendi, Wabag

Highway system
- Transport in Papua New Guinea

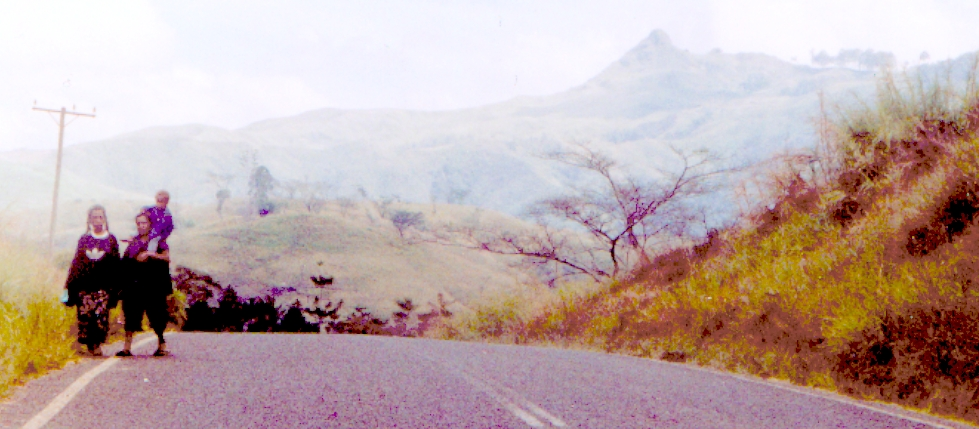
Highlands Highway in Eastern Highlands Province

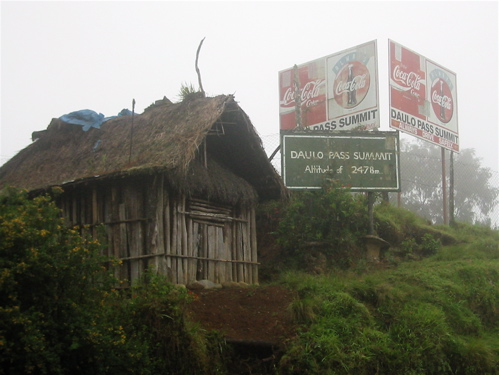
The sign marking the 2478 metre Daulo Pass

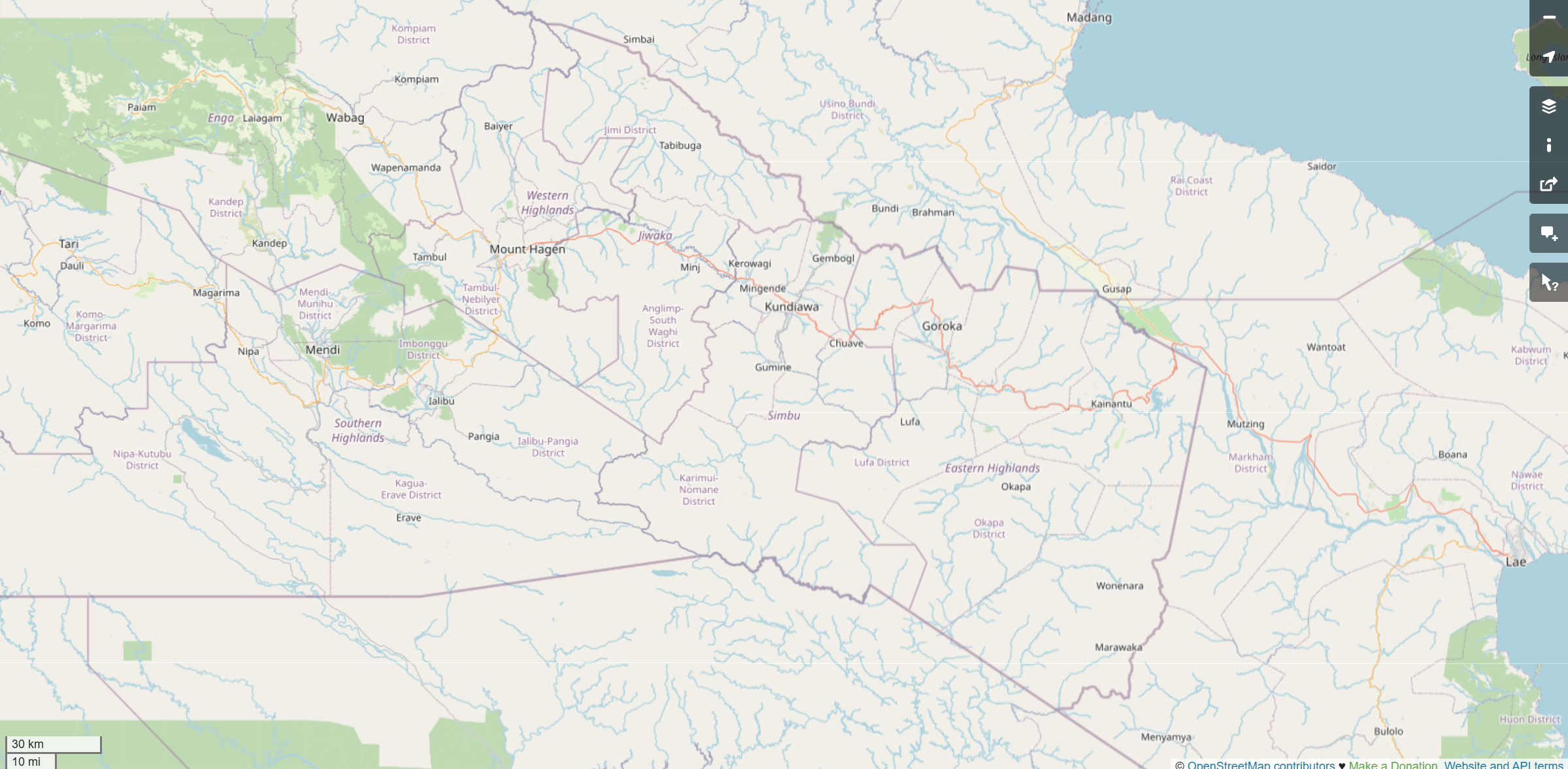

The Highlands Highway, sometimes known as the Okuk Highway, is the main land highway in Papua New Guinea. It connects several major cities and is vital for the movement of people and goods between the populous Highlands region and the coast.

For most of its length the Highlands Highway is no more than a single carriageway two-lane road that is often hindered by potholes and land slips. It is also notorious, particularly in the Highlands region, for local bandits called raskols conducting armed hold-ups and robberies.

== Description ==
The highway begins in Lae and travels through the Markham Valley and the province of Morobe. From the Markham Valley the Highlands Highway turns left and climbs up and over the approximately 1,500 metre high Kassam Pass and into the Eastern Highlands Province. It passes over the wall of Yonki Dam and then travels through the towns of Kainantu and Henganofi to the provincial capital, Goroka. From here it travels up and then over the 2,478 m (8,130 ft) high Daulo Pass and crosses into Simbu Province, hence, so many gazetted roads within Chuave District link the main Okuk High Way. Teine Agiyonga Memorial Roads like; Warabago-Wiridani Road, Giriyu-Kanma Road and Giriyu-Korima Road is few amongst many and through to its capital of Kundiawa. At the Markham Valley turn-off the road continues as the Ramu Highway through the Ramu Valley into Madang Province and ends at the coast at the provincial capital of Madang.

After Kundiawa the highway reaches the Wahgi valley, which marks the start of the Western Highlands Province. It continues through to the provincial capital of Mount Hagen and then at a village called Togoba, it splits. A southern branch continues on to the Southern Highlands province and its capital of Mendi before going on to Tari. The other branch goes to Enga province and its capital of Wabag before ending at the mining town of Porgera.

== Maintenance issues ==
In 2006 the eastern section of the highway (Lae-Goroka) was resurfaced by the Australian government AusAid Program. Several Japanese and Taiwanese projects have contributed to rebuilding or replacement of important bridges. The Porgera Gold Mine (PJV) is a major user of the Highlands Highway for transport of all its consumables and equipment from Lae port, and consequently spends an enormous amount of time and money on maintaining the road – most often the portion from Mt Hagen to Porgera – upgrading cuttings, bridges and culverts.

The highway is subject to frequent landslides and washouts. In April 2008, the section of the highway passing through Simbu Province was impassable at three separate points over different periods. The most serious of these destroyed a 150-metre section of the highway at Gera village, 10 km east of Kundiawa, on 11 April; this cut off the upper Highlands provinces from all road transport.

The 2024 Enga landslide washed out a section of the Highlands Highway in Enga Province.
