= Microcrystallization =

Analytical technique used in lichenology

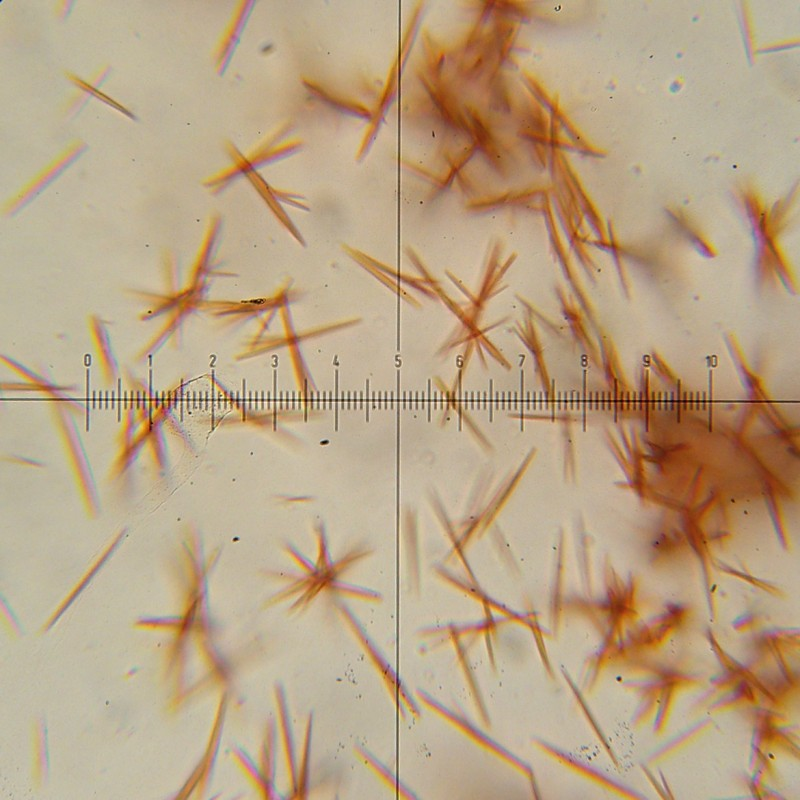
Crystals of norstictic acid, obtained by adding potassium hydroxide solution to an apothecial section of the crustose lichen Aspicilia cinerea

Microcrystallization (or microcrystal test) is a method for identifying lichen metabolites that was predominantly used before the advent of more advanced techniques such as thin-layer chromatography and high-performance liquid chromatography. Developed primarily by Yasuhiko Asahina, this approach relies on the formation of distinctive crystals from lichen extracts. Although now superseded by modern analytical methods, microcrystallization still holds importance for compound purification and analysis using X-ray crystallography.

== History ==
Between 1936 and 1940, Japanese chemist and lichenologist Yasuhiko Asahina published a series of papers in the Journal of Japanese Botany detailing the microcrystallization technique. This simple and rapid method allowed for the identification of major metabolites in hundreds of lichen species, contributing significantly to taxonomic research. The technique was introduced to western lichenologists in a 1943 publication by Alexander Evans, and was used regularly until more advanced techniques such as thin-layer chromatography and high-performance liquid chromatography were introduced and integrated into laboratories. Decades of research on the secondary metabolites of lichens culminated in the publication of Identification of Lichen Substances, a 1996 work by Siegfried Huneck and Isao Yoshimura, that summarized analytical data for hundreds of lichen molecules, including images of microcrystals. Ultimately, the microcrystallization method had limitations, as it was unable to detect minor components or analyze complex mixtures of lichen substances. Despite these drawbacks, microcrystallization played a crucial role in the study of correlations between lichen chemistry, morphology, and geographic distribution.

== Procedure ==
To perform microcrystallization, a small piece of lichen is extracted using acetone or other solvents, filtered, and evaporated to yield a residue. The residue is transferred to a microscope slide, and a drop of microcrystallization reagent is added before capping with a cover glass. Commonly used reagents include GAW (H_{2}O/glycerol/ethanol 1:1:1, v/v/v) and GE (acetic acid/glycerol 1:3). Slides using GE or GAW are gently heated and then allowed to cool, promoting the crystallization process. Once formed, crystals are best observed under polarized light with a 200–1,000-fold magnification.

This method requires basic laboratory equipment, including a microscope equipped for polarized light, test tubes, pipettes, a micro spirit-lamp or micro Bunsen burner, spatula or scalpel, and microscope slides and cover glasses. Lichen substances can be identified based on the distinctive shape and color of their crystals.

== Identification and interpretation ==
The process of crystal identification involves comparing them to images of crystals in different solvents found in published sources. Although the shape of the crystals depends on the solvent and, to a certain degree, the substance concentration, it is usually possible to recognize the fundamental crystalline forms. Care should be taken to differentiate between undissolved substances, which might be crystalline but lack a characteristic shape, and recrystallized substances. Microcrystal samples cannot be preserved for long, as they start to degrade within hours or days.

Distinguishing between gyrophoric acid and lecanoric acid using thin-layer chromatography can be challenging. However, if one of these substances is known to be present, a microcrystal test can help differentiate them. In the GAW solvent system, lecanoric acid forms long, curved crystal clusters, although the results can be inconsistent, especially in the presence of other substances. Gyrophoric acid, when present in the GE solvent system, may manifest as small, fine crystal clusters or rounded aggregations of tiny crystals. Lecanoric acid in the GE solvent system produces needle-like crystal clusters, but these are not as well-formed as in GAW. These tests can help distinguish Punctelia borreri (which contains gyrophoric acid) from Punctelia subrudecta (which contains lecanoric acid).

When two substances generate similar-looking crystals, their optical properties can be used to differentiate between them. Certain crystals alter the polarization plane of transmitted light, and when rotated between crossed polarizers, they alternate between bright and dark every 90°. The extinction angle is the angle between a specific crystal axis and the filter's polarization plane when the crystal appears dark (in extinction). For instance, this method can be employed to distinguish between perlatolic acid and imbricaric acid, which both form long, straight crystals in the GE solvent system but exhibit extinction angles of 0° and 45°, respectively, in relation to their long axis.

== See also ==
- Spot test (lichen)
