= Cephalaeschna acutifrons =

Conservation status
- Data Deficient (IUCN 3.1)

Scientific classification
- Kingdom: Animalia
- Phylum: Arthropoda
- Class: Insecta
- Order: Odonata
- Infraorder: Anisoptera
- Family: Aeshnidae
- Genus: Cephalaeschna
- Species: C. acutifrons

Binomial name
- Cephalaeschna acutifrons (Martin, 1909)

Species of dragonfly

Cephalaeschna acutifrons is a species of dragonfly in the family Aeshnidae. It is endemic to India.
