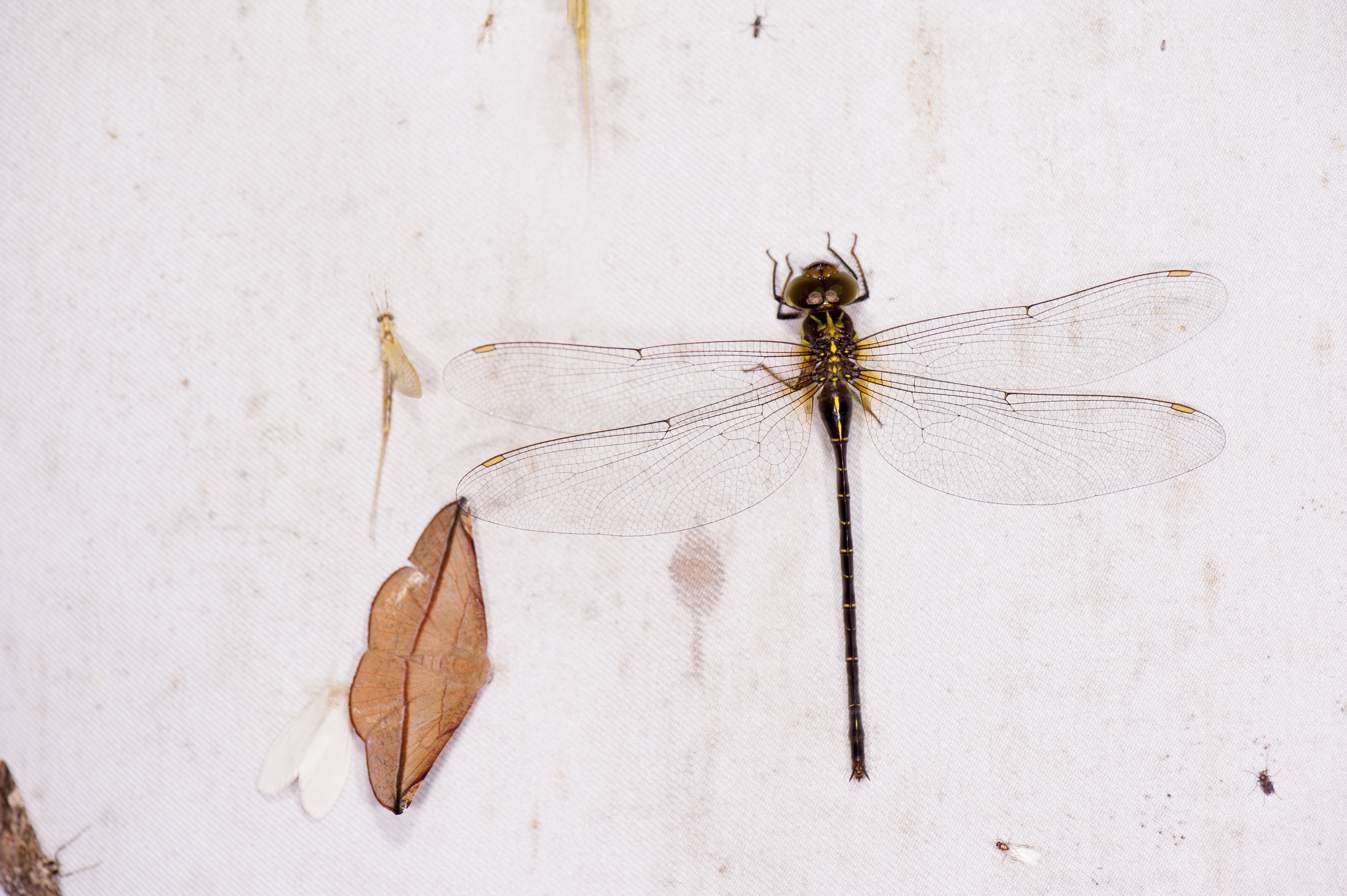
- Cephalaeschna risi

Scientific classification
- Kingdom: Animalia
- Phylum: Arthropoda
- Clade: Pancrustacea
- Class: Insecta
- Order: Odonata
- Infraorder: Anisoptera
- Family: Aeshnidae
- Genus: Cephalaeschna; Selys, 1883

= Cephalaeschna =

Genus of dragonflies

Cephalaeschna is a genus of dragonflies in the family Aeshnidae.

The genus contains the following species:

- Cephalaeschna acanthifrons Joshi & Kunte, 2017
- Cephalaeschna acutifrons (Martin, 1909)
- Cephalaeschna aipishishi Karube & Kompier, 2017
- Cephalaeschna algorei Karube & Kompier, 2017
- Cephalaeschna aritai Karube, 2003
- Cephalaeschna asahinai Karube, 2011
- Cephalaeschna chaoi Asahina, 1982
- Cephalaeschna cornifrons Zhang & Cai, 2013
- Cephalaeschna dinghuensis Wilson, 1999
- Cephalaeschna discolor Zhang, Cai & Liao, 2013
- Cephalaeschna klapperichi Schmidt, 1961
- Cephalaeschna klotsae Asahina, 1982 – yellow-spotted dusk-hawker
- Cephalaeschna masoni (Martin, 1909)
- Cephalaeschna mattii Zhang, Cai & Liao, 2013
- Cephalaeschna needhami Asahina, 1981
- Cephalaeschna obversa Needham, 1930
- Cephalaeschna orbifrons Selys, 1883
- Cephalaeschna ordopapiliones Zhang & Cai, 2013
- Cephalaeschna patrai Dawn, 2021
- Cephalaeschna patrorum Needham, 1930
- Cephalaeschna risi Asahina, 1981
- Cephalaeschna shaowuensis Xu, 2006
- Cephalaeschna solitaria Zhang, Cai & Liao, 2013
- Cephalaeschna triadica Lieftinck, 1977
- Cephalaeschna viridifrons (Fraser, 1922)
- Cephalaeschna xixiangensis Zhang, 2013
- Cephalaeschna yanagisawai Sasamoto & Vu, 2018
- Cephalaeschna yashiroi Sasamoto & Vu, 2021
- Cephalaeschna zhuae Yang, 2019
