= Megalotremis =

Scientific classification
- Kingdom: Fungi
- Division: Ascomycota
- Class: Dothideomycetes
- Order: Monoblastiales
- Family: Monoblastiaceae
- Genus: Megalotremis; Aptroot (1991)

Type species
- Megalotremis verrucosa (Makhija & Patw.) Aptroot (1991)

Genus of lichen-forming fungi

Megalotremis is a genus of lichen-forming fungi in the family Monoblastiaceae. It has 16 species. The genus was circumscribed by Dutch lichenologist André Aptroot in 1991, with Megalotremis verrucosa assigned as the type species. Megalotremis is a pyrenolichen genus, meaning its species have perithecioid ascocarps: spherical or flask-shaped, sessile or partly immersed in the thallus, with a single opening (ostiole) and enclosed by a distinct wall.

== Species ==
- Megalotremis biocellata Aptroot (1991)
- Megalotremis cauliflora Aptroot, Sérus. & Lücking (2008)
- Megalotremis chibaensis H.Harada (2018) – Japan
- Megalotremis cylindrica Weerakoon & Aptroot (2016) – Sri Lanka
- Megalotremis dolabrata Aptroot (2014) – New Caledonia
- Megalotremis elegans (R.C.Harris) Lücking & Aptroot (2020)
- Megalotremis flavovulcana (Komposch) Aptroot (2008)
- Megalotremis holopolia (Nyl.) Lücking & Aptroot (2020)
- Megalotremis immersa (Makhija & Patw.) Lücking & Aptroot (2020)
- Megalotremis infernalis (Mont.) Aptroot (2008)
- Megalotremis lateralis Aptroot (2008) – Costa Rica
- Megalotremis megalospora (Vain.) Aptroot (1995)
- Megalotremis monospora (Makhija & Patw.) Lücking & Aptroot (2020)
- Megalotremis nemorosa (R.C.Harris) Aptroot (2008)
- Megalotremis pustulata Aptroot (1997) – Papua New Guinea
- Megalotremis verrucosa (Makhija & Patw.) Aptroot (1991)

The species formerly known as Megalotremis endobrya (Döbbeler & Poelt) Aptroot (2008) is now Acrocordia endobrya.
