= Monoblastia =

Scientific classification
- Kingdom: Fungi
- Division: Ascomycota
- Class: Dothideomycetes
- Order: Monoblastiales
- Family: Monoblastiaceae
- Genus: Monoblastia; Riddle (1923)

Type species
- Monoblastia palmicola Riddle (1923)

Species
- M. borinquensis M. buckii M. cypressi M. echinulospora M. lutescens M. palmicola M. papillosa M. pellucida M. quisqueyana M. rappii M. subsquamulosa

Genus of lichen-forming fungi

Monoblastia is a genus of lichens in the Monoblastiaceae family of fungi.
