= Syoziro Asahina =

Japanese entomologist (1913–2010)

- 朝比奈 正二郎
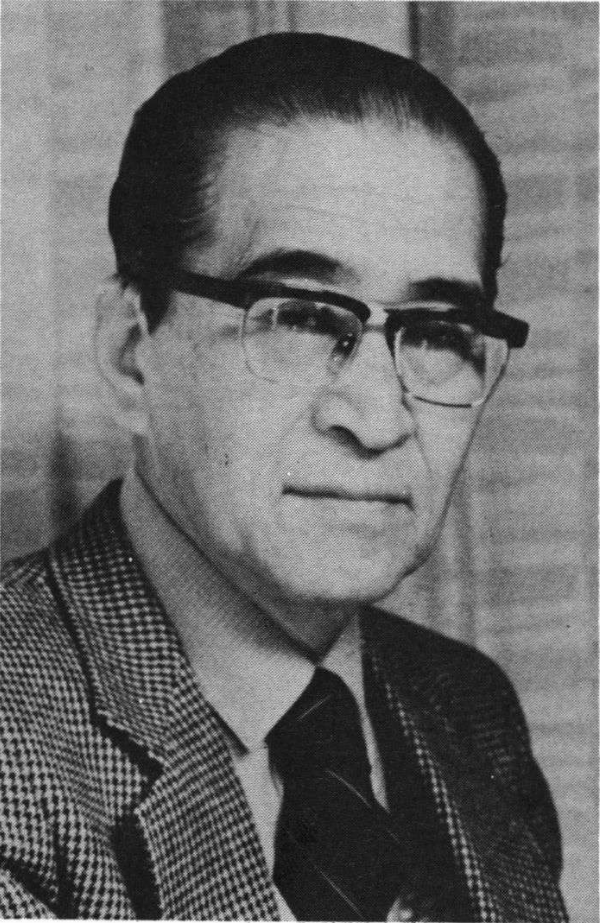
- Asahina in 1983
- Born: June 10, 1913; Bunkyō, Tokyo, Empire of Japan
- Died: November 28, 2010 (aged 97); Tokyo, Japan
- Education: Hokkaido University
- Occupation: Entomologist
- Known for: Taxonomic and ecological studies of dragonflies and cockroaches
- Father: Yasuhiko Asahina

Signature
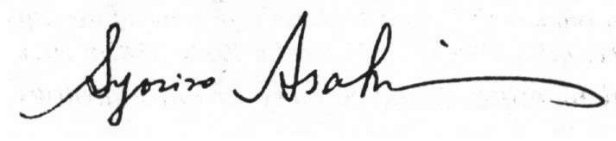

Syoziro Asahina (朝比奈 正二郎, Asahina Shōjirō; June 10, 1913, Bunkyō, Tokyo – November 28, 2010) was a Japanese entomologist, specializing in dragonflies and damselflies.

== Life ==
Asahina's father, Yasuhiko Asahina, was a professor of pharmacology at Tokyo Imperial University. Asahina began studying Odonata as a senior school student, and took part in collecting trips to Hokkaido and southern Sakhalin with his father. He spent much of his career as Chief of the Department of Medical Entomology at the Japanese National Institute of Health, from which he retired in 1979. He was president of the Entomological Society of Japan from 1971–1972 and president of the Japanese Society of Systematic Zoology from 1982–1983. Asahina died in 2010 at the age of 97.

== Selected publications ==
- Asahina, Syoziro 1954: A morphological study of a relic dragonfly Epiophlebia superstes Selys: (Odonata, Anisozygoptera), 153 [Japan Society for the Promotion of Science]
- Syoziro et al. 1971: Entomological Essays to Commemorate the Retirement of K. Yasumatsu., 389 [Hokuryukan Publishing]
- The Cavernicolous cockroaches of the Ryukyu Islands, 1974
- Asahina, Syoziro 1993: A list of the odonata from Thailand, [Bangkok : Bosco Offset]

== Patronyms ==
- Burmagomphus asahinai Kosterin, Makbun & Dawwrueng, 2012

== Sources ==
- Hoffmann, Joachim (February 2014). "2013 – Das Gedenkjahr an große Odonatologen". Libellennachrichten. 31 (1): 6–10. ISSN 1437-5621.
- Yamasaki, Tsukané (2011). "In Memoriam: Syoziro Asahina (1913–2010)" (PDF). Species Diversity. 16: 81–83.
