= Junichiro Shimoyama =

Japanese pharmacologist

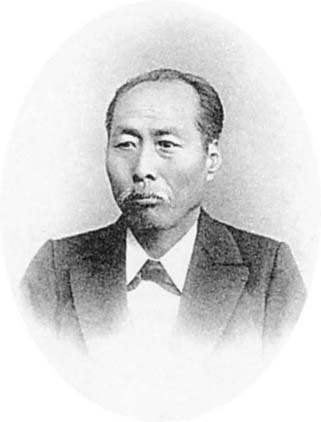
- J. Shimoyama, Professor of Pharmacy
- Born: March 27, 1853; Inuyama, Japan
- Died: February 12, 1912 (aged 58)
- Education: University of Tokyo; Strasbourg University
- Scientific career
- Fields: Pharmacology
- Workplaces: University of Tokyo

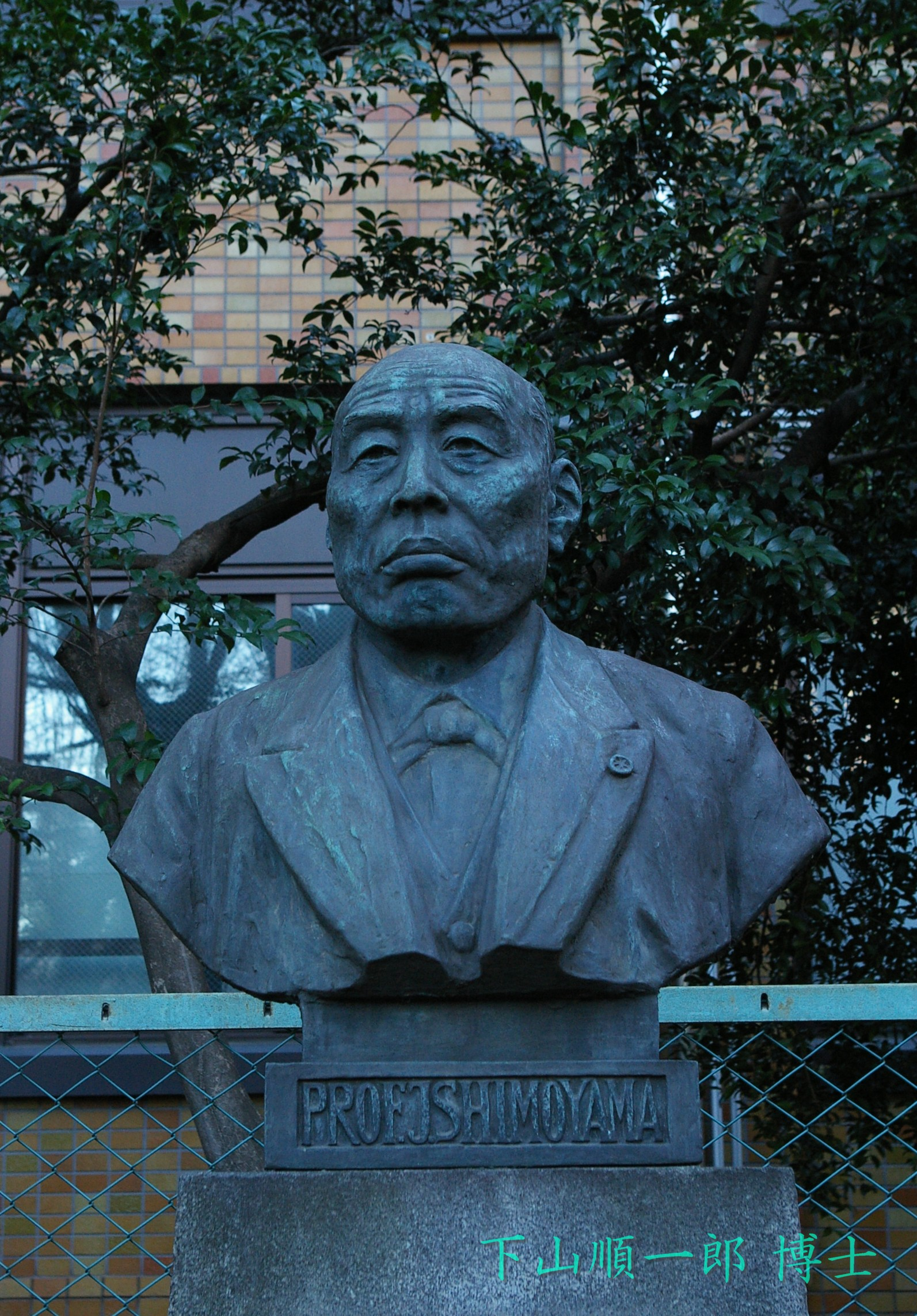
Bust of Shimoyama at The University of Tokyo, Hongō, erected in 1913

Junichiro Shimoyama (下山 順一郎 Shimoyama Jun'ichirō; March 27, 1853 – February 12, 1912) was a Japanese pharmacologist during the Meiji era.

== Biography ==
Shimoyama enrolled in The First University District Medical School, now part of the University of Tokyo, in 1873. He graduated in 1878. In 1886, Shimoyama received his Ph.D. from Strasbourg University. In 1887, Shimoyama returned to Tokyo to become a professor of the Department of Pharmacy. He became professor in the laboratory of pharmacognosy in 1893. Shimoyama was the first person in Japan to be awarded a Doctor of Pharmaceutical Sciences degree in 1899.

Shimoyama was one of the founding members of the Pharmaceutical Society of Tokyo, and he created a privately funded medicinal herb garden.
