= Kassam Pass =

Road pass in Papua New Guinea

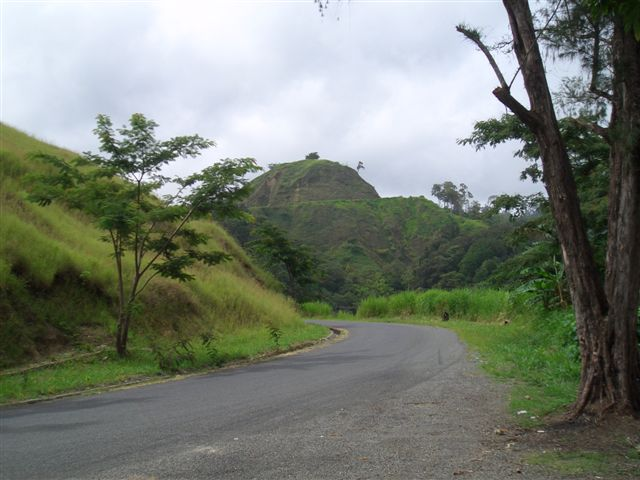
Top of the Kassam Pass viewed from Memorial

The Kassam Pass is a road pass on the Highlands Highway in Papua New Guinea. The pass connects the Markham Valley to the fertile Highlands region and is administratively located in the Eastern Highlands Province. It begins at the end of the Markham Valley and rises from a low altitude to around 1,500 m (4,921 ft) over approximately 10 km and finishes at the Yonki Dam.

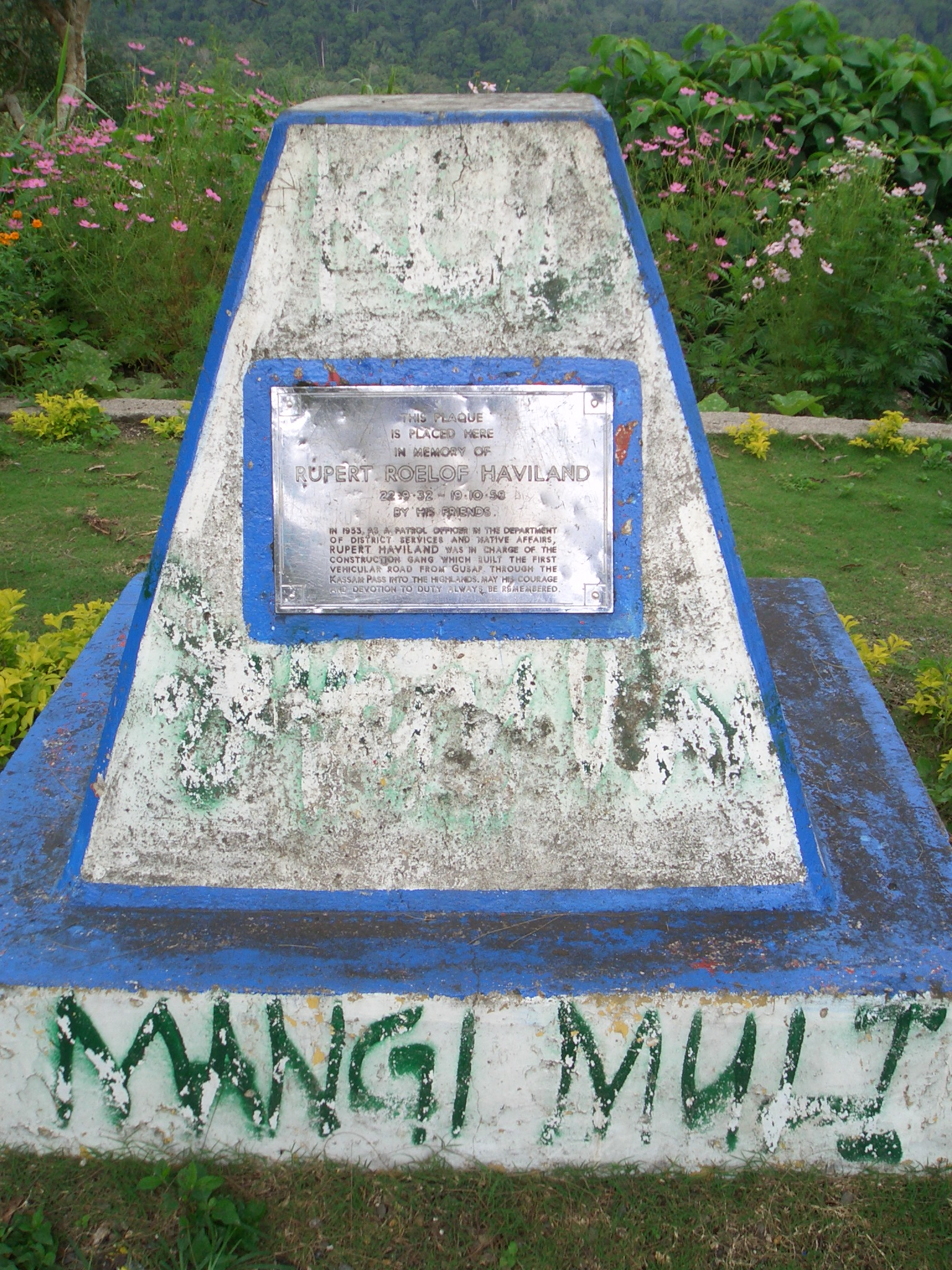
Memorial to Rupert Roelof Haviland approx. halfway up the pass

The pass was originally constructed in the early 1950s by the Australian administration through the Department of District Services and Native Affairs under the guidance of engineer Rupert Roelof Haviland and Administrator Don Cleland. It was repaired and upgraded from 2017/18.
