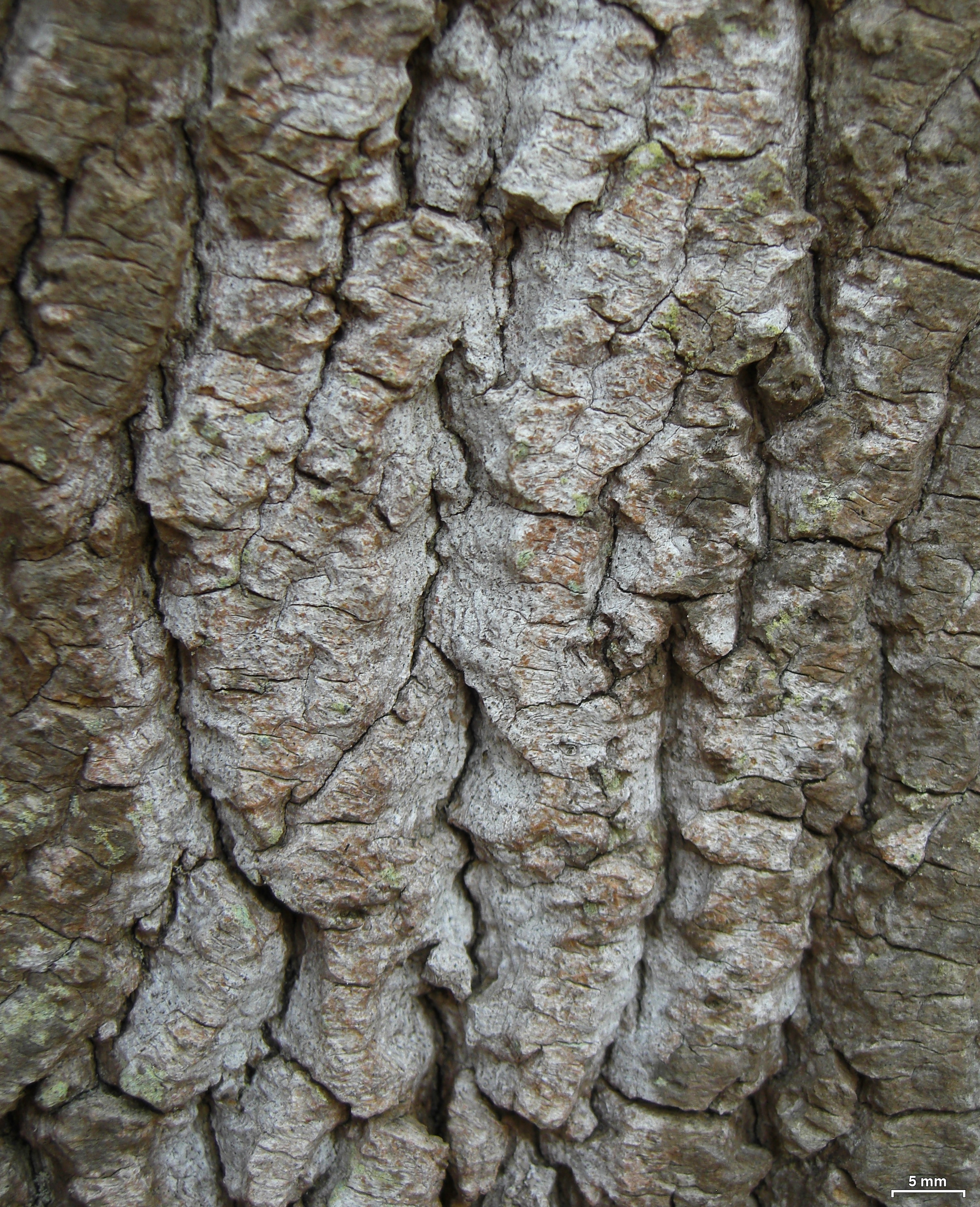
- Anisomeridium polypori

Scientific classification
- Kingdom: Fungi
- Division: Ascomycota
- Class: Dothideomycetes
- Order: Monoblastiales
- Family: Monoblastiaceae
- Genus: Anisomeridium (Müll.Arg.) M.Choisy (1928)

Type species
- Arthopyrenia xylogena Müll.Arg. (1883)

Synonyms
- Arthopyrenia sect. Anisomeridium Müll.Arg. (1883); Compsosporiella Sankaran & B.Sutton (1991); Ditremis Clem. (1909); Lembidium Körb. (1855); Microthelia Körb. (1855); Sarcinulella B.Sutton & Alcorn (1983)

= Anisomeridium =

Genus of lichen

Anisomeridium is a genus of lichen-forming fungi in the family Monoblastiaceae. These lichens form thin, nearly invisible crusts that grow mostly embedded within the bark of trees or other surfaces. They are distinguished by their tiny flask-shaped fruiting bodies and distinctive spores that have internal cross-walls positioned closer to one end than the other.

== Taxonomy ==
The type species was originally named Arthopyrenia xylogena by the Swiss lichenologist Johannes Müller Argoviensis in 1883; in 1928, Maurice Choisy defined the genus Anisomeridium, designating A. xylogena as the type.

== Description ==
Anisomeridium forms an inconspicuous crust that lies almost completely within its substrate—usually the bark of broad-leaved trees, but sometimes decaying wood, mosses, or shaded rock. Because the thallus is immersed it appears only as a faint pale-grey film or scatter of whitish patches, and it lacks a separate protective cortex; microscopic inspection shows a loose weft of fungal threads housing orange-tinged filaments of the green alga Trentepohlia, which supplies photosynthetic energy.

Sexual reproduction takes place in tiny flask-shaped fruit bodies (perithecia) that are half-buried to almost fully exposed. Individual perithecia are hemispherical to nearly spherical and can merge into small compound clusters. Their carbonised wall is thicker in the upper half and commonly bears a well-defined cap (the involucrellum). A quick field test with potassium hydroxide solution turns this wall a greenish tint, helping to separate Anisomeridium from similar genera. Internally, the cavity is filled with a clear gel threaded by slim, long-celled pseudoparaphyses that branch sparingly and fuse together, while the short hairs (periphyses) found in many flask lichens are absent. Each spore sac (ascus) is cylindrical to club-shaped, splits lengthwise when mature (fissitunicate), and possesses a small lens-like ocular chamber at the tip. Eight colourless ascospores are arranged in one or two rows; they are egg- to spindle-shaped, carry one to three cross-walls, and typically develop their first septum nearer the basal end of the spore.

Asexual propagules are just as common. Immersed or slightly protruding pycnidia produce two sizes of conidia in separate structures: larger macroconidia that are ellipsoid rods and smaller microconidia that are almost spherical. Both types are simple (non-septate) and may be expelled en masse as a slimy white tendril. No secondary lichen substances have been detected in European representatives of the genus, so identification relies on the combination of an almost invisible thallus, greenish K-reaction of the perithecial wall, and thin-walled, multi-septate spores with a distinctive low-end septum.

== Species ==
As of June 2025, Species Fungorum accepts 35 species of Anisomeridium:

- Anisomeridium americanum (A.Massal.) R.C.Harris (1995)
- Anisomeridium anisolobum (Müll.Arg.) Aptroot (1995)
- Anisomeridium australiense (P.M.McCarthy) R.C.Harris (1995)
- Anisomeridium austroaustraliense P.M.McCarthy & Kantvilas (2016) – Australia
- Anisomeridium biforme (Borrer) R.C.Harris (1978)
- Anisomeridium calcicola Upreti & Nayaka (2006) – India
- Anisomeridium carinthiacum (J.Steiner) R.C.Harris (1987)
- Anisomeridium concameratum (Stirt.) Aptroot (2006)
- Anisomeridium consobrinum (Nyl.) Aptroot (1995)
- Anisomeridium disjunctum P.M.McCarthy & Kantvilas (2018) – Australia
- Anisomeridium excellens (Nyl. ex Müll.Arg.) R.C.Harris (1995)
- Anisomeridium foliicola R.Sant. & Tibell (1988) – Australia
- Anisomeridium globosum Aptroot, D.S.Andrade & M.Cáceres (2014)
- Anisomeridium grumatum (Cooke ex Sacc.) Aptroot (1998)
- Anisomeridium guttuliferum Lücking (2008)
- Anisomeridium lateriticum Aptroot & M.Cáceres (2013)
- Anisomeridium macaronesicum van den Boom (2015)
- Anisomeridium macropycnidiatum van den Boom (2015)
- Anisomeridium platypodum G.Thor, Lücking & Tat.Matsumoto (2000)
- Anisomeridium polypori (Ellis & Everh.) M.E.Barr (1996)
- Anisomeridium prolongatum Lücking (2008)
- Anisomeridium ranunculosporum (Coppins & P.James) Coppins (2002)
- Anisomeridium robustum Orange, Coppins & Aptroot (2008) – Europe
- Anisomeridium subnectendum (Nyl.) R.C.Harris (1995)
- Anisomeridium subnexum (Nyl.) R.C.Harris (1995)
- Anisomeridium subprostans (Nyl.) R.C.Harris (1980)
- Anisomeridium terminatum (Nyl.) R.C.Harris (1995)
- Anisomeridium tetrasporum Aptroot & Sipman (2001) – Hong Kong
- Anisomeridium trichiale Aptroot & Etayo (2017) – Panama
- Anisomeridium triseptatum Aptroot & M.Cáceres (2013)
- Anisomeridium viridescens (Coppins) R.C.Harris (1995)
- Anisomeridium yoshimurae H.Harada (2019) – Japan
