= Caprettia =

Scientific classification
- Kingdom: Fungi
- Division: Ascomycota
- Class: Dothideomycetes
- Order: Monoblastiales
- Family: Monoblastiaceae
- Genus: Caprettia; Bat. & H.Maia (1965)

Type species
- Caprettia amazonensis Bat. & H.Maia (1965)

Species
- C. amazonensis C. confusa C. goderei C. lichexanthotricha C. neotropica C. nyssogenoides C. ornata

Synonyms
- Porinella R.Sant. (2004); Porinula Vězda (1975)

Genus of lichens

Caprettia is a genus of lichenized fungi in the family Monoblastiaceae. The genus was circumscribed by Augusto Chaves Batista and Heraldo da Silva Maia in 1965, with Caprettia amazonensis assigned as the type species.

The genus name of Caprettia is in honour of Corrado Capretti (1915–1960), an Italian botanist and professor at University of the Andes (Venezuela) in 1956.

== Species ==
- Caprettia amazonensis Bat. & H.Maia (1965)
- Caprettia confusa Lücking & Sipman (2008)
- Caprettia goderei Yeshitela, Eb.Fisch., Killmann & Sérus. (2009)
- Caprettia lichexanthotricha Aptroot & M.F.Souza (2021)
- Caprettia neotropica Lücking & Sérus. (2003)
- Caprettia nyssogenoides Sérus. & Lücking (2003)
- Caprettia ornata (R.Sant. & Vězda) Lücking & Sérus. (2008)
