= Yasuhiko Asahina =

Japanese lichenologist

- Yasuhiko Asahina, 1959
- Born: April 16, 1881; Tokyo, Japan
- Died: June 30, 1975 (aged 94)
- Education: University of Tokyo
- Scientific career
- Fields: Lichenology
- Workplaces: University of Tokyo
- Notable students: Syo Kurokawa
- Author abbrev. (botany): Asahina

Yasuhiko Asahina (朝比奈泰彦 Asahina Yasuhiko; April 16, 1881 – June 30, 1975) was a Japanese chemist and lichenologist.

Asahina was nominated for the Nobel Prize in Chemistry in 1951 and 1952, but did not win the award.

== Early life ==
During his childhood, Asahina developed an interest in plants. In 1902, he enrolled in the School of Pharmacy at Tokyo Imperial University, where he graduated in 1905. Asahina stayed at the university to research the chemical principles of Chinese traditional medicine under Junichiro Shimoyama. His first paper, on styracitol isolation from Styrax obassia, was published in 1907. In 1909, Asahina traveled to Zürich to study phytochemistry under Richard Willstätter. He continued his research on chlorophyll until 1912 when he moved to Berlin. He spent three months in Germany working in Professor Emil Fischer's laboratory on a styracitol experiment.

== Career ==
Upon his return to Tokyo, Asahina accepted an associate professor position at Tokyo Imperial University. For the next decade, Asahina was devoted to researching traditional and folk medicines of China and Japan. In 1925, he shifted his focus to lichens. He had trouble identifying the lichens he wished to research, as at the time, Atsushi Yasuda was the only lichenologist in Japan. Asahina realized that some morphologically identical lichens contained different chemical compounds. Asahina developed a method of thalline color reaction and the microcrystal test of lichen metabolites. He utilized this chemical identification for taxonomic differentiation of these lichens. Using this method, he helped clean up the taxonomy of the genus Cladonia. He also studied many other genera in Japan, most notably Alectoria, Anzia, Cetraria, Lobaria, Parmelia, Ramalina, and Usnea. The technique was taught to Alexander William Evans, who introduced it to Western technologists in 1943.

Asahina retired from the University of Tokyo in 1941. In 1954, he founded the Japanese Society for History of Pharmacy (Nihon Yakushi Gakkai, 日本薬史学会). Asahina continued his research at his private laboratory until he died in 1975. He distributed the exsiccata series Lichenes Japoniae exsiccati.

== Awards ==
Asahina was awarded the Imperial Prize of the Japan Academy in 1923 for his contribution to research on Chinese drug principles. In 1943, he received the Order of Culture.

== Legacy ==
Syoziro Asahina, notable entomologist, was Asahina's son. The lichen genus Asahinea was named in honour of Yasuhiko Asahina.

== See also ==
- Category:Taxa named by Yasuhiko Asahina
- Grayanic acid
