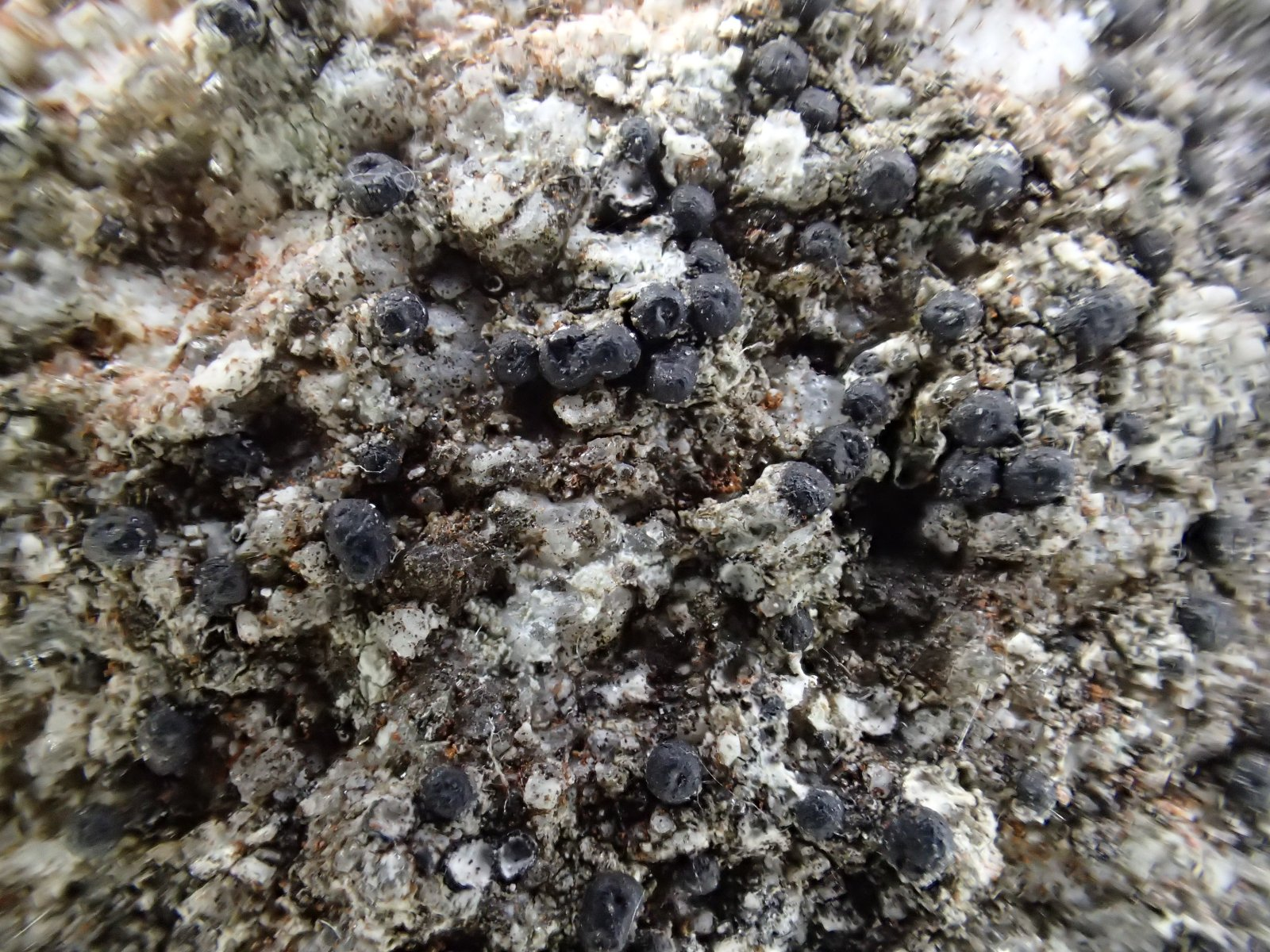
- Acrocordia macrospora

Scientific classification
- Kingdom: Fungi
- Division: Ascomycota
- Class: Dothideomycetes
- Order: Monoblastiales; Lücking, M.P.Nelsen & K.D.Hyde (2013)
- Family: Monoblastiaceae; W.Watson (1929)

Type genus
- Monoblastia Riddle (1923)

Genera
- Acrocordia; Anisomeridium; Caprettia; Megalotremis; Monoblastia; Trypetheliopsis

= Monoblastiaceae =

Family of lichen-forming fungi

The Monoblastiaceae are a family of lichen-forming fungi in the monotypic order Monoblastiales. It contains six genera. These lichens typically form inconspicuous thin crusts or films on bark, rock, or leaves, often appearing as little more than a whitish or greyish discolouration of the surface. They reproduce through tiny black flask-shaped structures embedded in the crust that release spores through small pores at their tips. The family includes about 120 species distributed worldwide, particularly in tropical and subtropical regions where they grow in humid environments.

== Taxonomy ==
The family was circumscribed by the British botanist William Watson in 1929 to accommodate a group of lichens characterised by crustose or leafy thalli with Trentepohlia or allied algae as photobionts, except for Haplopycnula, which has Phyllactidium as its photobiont. Watson distinguished the family by its simple perithecia with apical pores and asci containing 2–8 simple spores. The family includes several genera transferred from other families: Coccotrema and Monoblastia from the Pyrenulaceae, Haplopycnula from the Strigulaceae, and Lepolichen, which Watson noted as the sole representative of the Phyllopyreniaceae. Watson's circumscription was based on thallus structure (foliose versus crustose), paraphyses characteristics (branched and entangled versus simple and free), and the type of algal photobiont present.

== Description ==
Most members of the Monoblastiaceae produce a rather inconspicuous lichen body (thallus) that ranges in appearance from an extremely thin, whitish film lacking any outer skin (cortex) to a more obvious grey-green or olive-brown crust with a glossy surface and a simple, sheath-like cortex. The fungal partner houses filamentous green algae of the genus Trentepohlia, whose orange-tinged cells supply the photosynthetic energy. Depending on species, the thallus may sit flush with bark, rock, or leaves, or form a faint, cracked pattern that is almost indistinguishable from the substrate.

Sexual reproduction occurs in perithecia—minute, flask-shaped fruit bodies that are partly to fully embedded in the thallus. They are typically black, rounded to pear- or cone-shaped, and made of carbonised (charcoal-like) tissue; their singular opening (the ostiole) is often off-centre. An outer coat, the involucrellum, may completely encase the perithecium or persist only as a dark cap, while the inner wall (exciple) is built from tightly compressed fungal threads (hyphae) that can be colourless, brown, or almost black. Inside, a web of narrow pseudoparaphyses—slender filaments that branch and fuse—threads the gelatinous spore layer. The spore sacs (asci) split lengthwise when ripe (fissitunicate) and usually contain eight ascospores, although single-spored asci occur in a few taxa. Each ascus terminates in a clear, lens-like chamber and a tiny light-refracting cap that aid spore discharge. The spores themselves vary from egg- to spindle-shaped, may be divided by up to three cross-walls (septa), and are normally colourless with a smooth or faintly ornamented surface.

Asexual propagules are produced in abundance. Flask-like pycnidia remain immersed or become slightly stalked; in some species they elongate into hair-like beaks or develop asymmetrically into ear-shaped campylidia. These structures release either larger rod-shaped macroconidia or much smaller spherical to spindle-shaped microconidia, all lacking internal walls. Chemical studies have shown that most Monoblastiaceae contain no secondary metabolites, but a few species synthesise lichexanthone, which fluoresces yellow under ultraviolet light, or deposit reddish anthraquinone pigments in their walls.

== Genera ==
- Acrocordia A.Massal. (1854) – 6 spp.
- Anisomeridium (Müll.Arg.) M.Choisy (1928) – ca. 80 spp.
- Caprettia Bat. & H.Maia (1965) – 8 spp.
- Megalotremis Aptroot (1991) – 12 spp.
- Monoblastia Riddle (1923) – 11 spp.
- Trypetheliopsis Asahina (1937) – 6 spp.
