= Astrothelium bullatothallinum =

Scientific classification
- Kingdom: Fungi
- Division: Ascomycota
- Class: Dothideomycetes
- Order: Trypetheliales
- Family: Trypetheliaceae
- Genus: Astrothelium
- Species: A. bullatothallinum

Binomial name
- Astrothelium bullatothallinum Aptroot & Sipman (2019)

Species of lichen

Astrothelium bullatothallinum is a species of corticolous (bark-dwelling) lichen in the family Trypetheliaceae. Found in Venezuela, it was formally described as a new species in 2019 by lichenologists André Aptroot and Harrie Sipman. The type specimen was collected by Sipman along the Carapo River (Cerro Guaiquinima, Bolívar) at an altitude of 800 m (2,600 ft). The lichen has a smooth, yellowish orange thallus that is more or less shiny and covers areas up to 15 cm (6 in) in diameter. It has roughly spherical ascomata, measuring 0.3–0.5 mm in diameter, which aggregate on the thallus surface in lines or in irregular groups. The ascospores are hyaline with three septa and measure 20–25 by 6–9 μm. The specific epithet bullatothallinum refers to the bullate (i.e., convex and swollen) thallus.
