= Astrothelium trypethelioides =

Scientific classification
- Kingdom: Fungi
- Division: Ascomycota
- Class: Dothideomycetes
- Order: Trypetheliales
- Family: Trypetheliaceae
- Genus: Astrothelium
- Species: A. trypethelioides

Binomial name
- Astrothelium trypethelioides Aptroot (2016)

Species of lichen

Astrothelium trypethelioides is a species of corticolous (bark-dwelling) lichen in the family Trypetheliaceae. Found in Venezuela, it was formally described as a new species in 2016 by André Aptroot. The type specimen was collected by Harrie Sipman along the Carapo River (Cerro Guaiquinima, Bolivar) at an altitude of 800 m (2,600 ft). The lichen has a smooth, somewhat shiny, pale yellowish-grey thallus that covers areas of up to 9 cm (3.5 in). Its ascospores are hyaline, spindle-shaped (fusiform) with between 7 and 9 septa and dimensions of 49–52 by 13–16 μm. No lichen products were detected in the species using thin-layer chromatography.
