= Astrothelium ultralucens =

Scientific classification
- Kingdom: Fungi
- Division: Ascomycota
- Class: Dothideomycetes
- Order: Trypetheliales
- Family: Trypetheliaceae
- Genus: Astrothelium
- Species: A. ultralucens

Binomial name
- Astrothelium ultralucens Aptroot (2016)

Species of lichen

Astrothelium ultralucens is a species of corticolous (bark-dwelling) lichen in the family Trypetheliaceae. Found in Venezuela, it was formally described as a new species in 2016 by André Aptroot. The type specimen was collected by Harrie Sipman along the Carapo River (Cerro Guaiquinima, Bolivar) at an elevation of 800 m (2,600 ft). The lichen has a smooth, somewhat shiny pale greenish grey thallus that covers an area of up to 7 cm (2.8 in). Its ascospores are hyaline, spindle-shaped (fusiform) with three septa and dimensions of 105–130 by 35–42 μm. Astrothelium ultralucens contains lichexanthone, a lichen product that causes the pseudostromata and the thallus to fluoresce yellow when lit with a long-wavelength UV light, although the thallus only weakly.
