= Astrothelium guianense =

Scientific classification
- Kingdom: Fungi
- Division: Ascomycota
- Class: Dothideomycetes
- Order: Trypetheliales
- Family: Trypetheliaceae
- Genus: Astrothelium
- Species: A. guianense

Binomial name
- Astrothelium guianense Aptroot (2016)

Species of lichen

Astrothelium guianense is a species of corticolous (bark-dwelling) lichen in the family Trypetheliaceae. Found in Guyana, it was formally described as a new species in 2016 by Dutch lichenologist André Aptroot. The type specimen was collected Harrie Sipman and the author from the Pacaraima Mountains (Cuyuni-Mazaruni region), where it was found in a rainforest growing on smooth tree bark. The lichen has a discontinuous, olive-green thallus with a cortex but lacking a prothallus, which covers areas of up to 6 cm (2.4 in) in diameter. The presence of the lichen induces the formation of galls in its host, which tends to split and deform under the thallus. No lichen products were detected in the collected specimens using thin-layer chromatography. The main characteristics of the lichen distinguishing it from others in Astrothelium are its gall-like thallus that has a bullate or folded texture; its solitary ascomata, which are immersed in the thallus and have only an area around the ostiole that is visible; and ascospores (numbering four per ascus) that lack a thick median septum.
