= Astrothelium parathelioides =

Scientific classification
- Kingdom: Fungi
- Division: Ascomycota
- Class: Dothideomycetes
- Order: Trypetheliales
- Family: Trypetheliaceae
- Genus: Astrothelium
- Species: A. parathelioides

Binomial name
- Astrothelium parathelioides Aptroot & B.M.C.Barbosa (2022)

Species of lichen-forming fungus

Astrothelium parathelioides is a species of corticolous (bark-dwelling) crustose lichen in the family Trypetheliaceae. This species was described in 2022 from specimens collected in the Amazon rainforest of Brazil and is distinguished by its unusual fruiting bodies that open sideways rather than at the top, along with ascospores that have a distinctly thickened middle partition.

== Taxonomy ==
Astrothelium parathelioides was described as new to science by André Aptroot and Bruno Barbosa from material collected on tree bark in primary rainforest at the Cristalino Reserve, Mato Grosso, Brazil (250–350 m elevation; April 22–29, 2021). The specific epithet refers to the species' "parathelioid" fruiting bodies: perithecia whose pore (the ostiole) opens on the side rather than at the top. In overall appearance it resembles A. medioincrassatum, but that species has compound fruiting bodies with several pores fused together, whereas A. parathelioides has solitary perithecia with a single lateral pore and ascospores with a conspicuously thickened middle septum.

== Description ==
This is a corticolous (bark-dwelling) species. The lichen body (thallus) is slightly glossy and pale ocher, forming patches up to about 4 cm across and only to about 0.1 mm thick; it lacks a contrasting border (no prothallus). The sexual fruiting bodies are perithecia: small, pear-shaped structures mostly embedded in the thallus and sometimes breaking through the surface (immersed to erumpent), 0.5–0.8 mm in diameter. They occur singly (not clustered into composite pseudostromata). Each perithecium has one black ostiole positioned on the side (lateral), which is the tiny pore where spores are released. The internal, non-spore tissue (hamathecium) is clear rather than filled with oil droplets or granules (not inspersed).

Asci contain eight ascospores. The spores are hyaline (colorless), long-ellipsoid, and divided by 9–13 internal cross-walls (septa); the central septum is distinctly thickened. Ascospore size is 101–124 × 25–30 μm, they do not react with iodine (IKI–), and no gelatinous sheath is present. Asexual structures (pycnidia) appear as small black, erupting dots scattered among the perithecia, but their spores (conidia) were not observed.

Spot tests on the thallus are negative (K−, C−, P−) and there is no ultraviolet fluorescence (UV−). Thin-layer chromatography did not detect secondary metabolites.

== Habitat and distribution ==
Astrothelium parathelioides grows on tree bark in lowland primary rainforest. It is known only from Brazil, from the type locality in the Cristalino Reserve (Mato Grosso).

== See also ==
- List of lichens of Brazil
