= Astrothelium inspersogalbineum =

Scientific classification
- Kingdom: Fungi
- Division: Ascomycota
- Class: Dothideomycetes
- Order: Trypetheliales
- Family: Trypetheliaceae
- Genus: Astrothelium
- Species: A. inspersogalbineum

Binomial name
- Astrothelium inspersogalbineum Aptroot & Weerakoon (2016)

Species of lichen

Astrothelium inspersogalbineum is a species of corticolous (bark-dwelling), crustose lichen in the family Trypetheliaceae. Found in Singapore, it was formally described as a new species in 2016 by lichenologists André Aptroot and Gothamie Weerakoon. The type specimen was collected by the second author in a rainforest, where it was found growing on smooth bark. The lichen has a smooth and somewhat shiny, pale greenish-grey thallus with a cortex and a thin (0.2 mm wide) black prothallus line. It covers areas of up to 3 cm (1.2 in) in diameter, and does not induce gall formation in its host plant. A yellow to orange anthraquinone was the only lichen product detected in the collected specimens using thin-layer chromatography. A. inspersogalbineum also contains the compound lichexanthone, which causes the thallus to fluoresce yellow when lit with a long-wavelength UV light. The main characteristics of the lichen distinguishing it from others in Astrothelium are its inspersed hamathecium; its ascospores, with dimensions of 20–25 by 9–11 μm; and the grouping of its ascomata, which can fuse together to become irregularly confluent.
