= Astrothelium longisporum =

Scientific classification
- Kingdom: Fungi
- Division: Ascomycota
- Class: Dothideomycetes
- Order: Trypetheliales
- Family: Trypetheliaceae
- Genus: Astrothelium
- Species: A. longisporum

Binomial name
- Astrothelium longisporum Aptroot, J.R.Silva & M.Cáceres (2016)

Species of lichen

Astrothelium longisporum is a species of corticolous (bark-dwelling), crustose lichen in the family Trypetheliaceae. It occurs in the Atlantic Forest of Brazil.

== Taxonomy ==
The lichen was formally described in 2016 by the lichenologists André Aptroot, Jeanne dos Reis Silva, and Marcela Eugenia da Silva Cáceres. The type specimen was collected in Poço Redondo, Serra da Guia, Sergipe state. It is differentiated from the otherwise similar Astrothelium megaspermum by its eccentric ostioles and the count of ascospores per ascus.

== Description ==
Astrothelium longisporum is recognised by its corticate, somewhat bullate, and somewhat shiny thallus. The thallus is continuous, covering areas up to 6 cm in diameter and approximately 0.2 mm thick. It is pale olive-green and surrounded by a black prothallus about 0.3 mm wide. This species does not induce gall formation on the host bark. The ascomata are roughly spherical, measuring 0.8–1.2 mm in diameter, and are single in hemispherical warts covered by the thallus. The wall of the ascomata is carbonised and up to about 50 μm thick. Ostioles are eccentric, flat, and black, surrounded by an irregular whitish decorticate spot of approximately 0.5 mm. The hamathecium does not have oil globules interspersed. Asci contain eight ascospores, which are hyaline, muriform, fusiform, and measure 200–230 by 30–40 μm. These ascospores do not have a distinctly thickened median septum, with ends that are rounded and not surrounded by a gelatinous layer. Pycnidia have not been observed in this species.

The surface of the thallus is UV− and the thallus medulla is K−; the decorticated ascoma surface is also UV−. Thin-layer chromatography, a technique used to identify chemical substances, did not detect any secondary metabolites in this lichen.

== Habitat and distribution ==
Astrothelium longisporum is found on smooth bark of trees in the Atlantic Forest and is known to occur only in Brazil.
