= Astrothelium solitarium =

Scientific classification
- Domain: Eukaryota
- Kingdom: Fungi
- Division: Ascomycota
- Class: Dothideomycetes
- Order: Trypetheliales
- Family: Trypetheliaceae
- Genus: Astrothelium
- Species: A. solitarium

Binomial name
- Astrothelium solitarium Aptroot & M.Cáceres (2016)

Species of lichen

Astrothelium solitarium is a species of corticolous (bark-dwelling) in the family Trypetheliaceae. Found in Brazil, it was formally described as a new species in 2016 by lichenologists André Aptroot and Marcela Cáceres. The species is closely related to Astrothelium ceratinum but differs in its ascospore size.

== Description ==
The thallus of Astrothelium solitarium is corticate, smooth, shiny, and continuous, covering areas up to 3 cm (1.2 in) in diameter. It is olive-green and less than 0.1 mm thick, surrounded by a dark brown prothallus line about 0.1 mm wide. This species does not induce gall formation on the host bark.

Ascomata are spherical, measuring 0.3–0.5 mm in diameter, and appear solitary or in groups of 2–4, erumpent from the bark. They are black, partly with irregular thallus coverage, and not in pseudostromata. The wall is black all around, with a thickness of up to about 30 μm. Ostioles are apical, not fused, flat, and dark brown, often surrounded by a pale brown ring. The hamathecium is not inspersed with oil globules. Asci contain 8 ascospores, which are hyaline, 3-septate, fusiform, and measure 33–36 by 10–11 μm.

Pycnidia were not observed in this species. In term of standard chemical spot tests, the thallus and medulla are UV− and K−. Thin-layer chromatography shows no secondary substances detected.

== Habitat and distribution ==
Astrothelium solitarium is found on smooth bark of trees in primary forests. Currently, it is known to occur only in Brazil.
