= Astrothelium bireagens =

Scientific classification
- Kingdom: Fungi
- Division: Ascomycota
- Class: Dothideomycetes
- Order: Trypetheliales
- Family: Trypetheliaceae
- Genus: Astrothelium
- Species: A. bireagens

Binomial name
- Astrothelium bireagens Lücking, N.Marín & Álvaro (2023)
- Type locality: La Ceiba indigenous community, Colombia

Species of lichen-forming fungus

Astrothelium bireagens is a species of crustose lichen-forming fungus in the family Trypetheliaceae. It is an olive-green to olive-yellow, bark-dwelling lichen with prominent, brownish black fruiting bodies that may fuse into grouped structures. The species was described in 2023 from specimens collected in white-sand savanna in Guainía, Colombia.

== Taxonomy ==
Astrothelium bireagens was described as a new species in 2023 by Robert Lücking, Norida Lucia Marín-Canchala, and Wilson Ricardo Álvaro-Alba. In their treatment of lichens from the Colombian Amazon, the authors distinguished it from Astrothelium cinnamomeum by a combination of features of the perithecia and pigments, including broader, apically flattened perithecia with a ferruginous-red pruina that turns deep purple with potassium hydroxide solution (K), and an internal ochraceous-yellow pigment that stains deep yellow with K. The species epithet bireagens refers to the two distinct color reactions produced with K.

== Description ==
The lichen forms a crust-like body (thallus) on bark, up to 5 cm (2 in) across and 200–500 μm thick. The surface is blistered or puffed-up (bullate) and light olive-green to olive-yellow, with a thick outer skin (cortex) over a loose algal layer and a thick inner tissue (medulla) containing many grayish crystals. The algal photosynthetic partner (photobiont) is from the green algal genus Trentepohlia.

The fruiting bodies (perithecia) are prominent and exposed, brownish black, and may be fused sideways into grouped structures (pseudostromatic groupings). Individual perithecia are 0.8–1.2 mm in diameter and 0.4–0.6 mm high, with a flattened top; the pore-like opening (ostiole) is sometimes multiple (2–3). Internally, each fruiting body has 5–10 chambers that merge into a single ostiole. The asci contain eight colorless, 4-celled (3-septate) ascospores with thick cross-walls (distosepta), measuring 17–22 × 6–8 μm; the spores do not stain with iodine (non-amyloid, I−). Thin, branched sterile filaments (paraphyses) are present in the tissue surrounding the asci (hamathecium).

== Habitat and distribution ==
The species is known from Colombia (Guainía Department), where it has been collected in the municipality of Inírida, including at 150–180 m (490–590 ft) elevation. It was found growing on bark in natural savanna vegetation over white sand, and the type collection was made near the La Ceiba indigenous community; an additional specimen was reported from the Caño Vitina community.
