= Astrothelium pseudannulare =

Scientific classification
- Kingdom: Fungi
- Division: Ascomycota
- Class: Dothideomycetes
- Order: Trypetheliales
- Family: Trypetheliaceae
- Genus: Astrothelium
- Species: A. pseudannulare

Binomial name
- Astrothelium pseudannulare Aptroot & Etayo (2016)

Species of lichen

Astrothelium pseudannulare is a species of corticolous (bark-dwelling), crustose lichen in the family Trypetheliaceae. Found in Ecuador, it was formally described as a new species in 2016 by Dutch lichenologists André Aptroot and Javier Etayo. The type specimen was collected from the Podocarpus National Park (Loja Province) at an altitude of 3,000 m (9,800 ft); there, it was found in a montane forest growing on smooth tree bark. The lichen has a smooth and shiny, olive-green thallus comprising patches of cortex that break through the host bark, covering areas about 1.0 to 3.5 mm in diameter. No lichen products were detected from collected samples of the lichen using thin-layer chromatography. The combination of characteristics of the lichen that distinguish it from others in Astrothelium are the rough thallus; the distribution of the ascomata, which ranges from solitary to irregularly confluent; and the form of the ascomata, which ranges from prominent to sessile. The ascospores are hyaline, spindle-shaped (fusiform), and have three septa; they measure 62–80 by 20–25 μm. The species epithet pseudannulare alludes to its resemblance to Astrothelium annulare, another species with large 3-septate spores.
