= Astrothelium laevithallinum =

Scientific classification
- Kingdom: Fungi
- Division: Ascomycota
- Class: Dothideomycetes
- Order: Trypetheliales
- Family: Trypetheliaceae
- Genus: Astrothelium
- Species: A. laevithallinum

Binomial name
- Astrothelium laevithallinum Lücking, M.P.Nelsen & Marcelli (2016)

Species of lichen-forming fungus

Astrothelium laevithallinum is a species of corticolous (bark-dwelling), crustose lichen in the family Trypetheliaceae. Found in Brazil, it was formally described as a new species in 2016 by Robert Lücking, Matthew Nelsen, and Marcelo Marcelli. The type specimen was collected by the first author from the Santuário do Caraça (Reserva Particular do Patrimônio Natural, Minas Gerais) at an altitude between 1,300 and 1,400 m (4,300 and 4,600 ft); there, in Atlantic Forest, it was found in a forest remnant near a waterfall. The lichen has a smooth to uneven, green thallus that covers areas of up to 5 cm (2 in) in diameter. The species epithet laevithallinum alludes to the contrast between its smooth thallus and the bullate thallus of its phylogenetically distinct but close relative, Astrothelium endochryseum. The characteristic of the lichen that distinguishes A. laevithallinum from others in genus Astrothelium is the smooth thallus.

== See also ==
- List of lichens of Brazil
