= Astrothelium macrostomoides =

Scientific classification
- Kingdom: Fungi
- Division: Ascomycota
- Class: Dothideomycetes
- Order: Trypetheliales
- Family: Trypetheliaceae
- Genus: Astrothelium
- Species: A. macrostomoides

Binomial name
- Astrothelium macrostomoides Lücking, M.P.Nelsen & Benatti (2016)

Species of lichen-forming fungus

Astrothelium macrostomoides is a species of corticolous (bark-dwelling), crustose lichen in the family Trypetheliaceae. Found in Brazil, it was formally described as a new species in 2016 by Robert Lücking, Matthew Nelsen, Michel Navarro Benatti. The type specimen was collected by the first author from the Santuário do Caraça (Reserva Particular do Patrimônio Natural, Minas Gerais) at an altitude between 1,300 to 1,400 m (4,300 to 4,600 ft); there, in the Atlantic Forest biome, it was found growing on bark in a gallery forest along a river. The lichen has an uneven to coarsely bullate, olive-green thallus that covers areas of up to 7 cm (2.8 in). Ascomata are in the form of perithecia, which are arranged in aggregated groups of 5–10 in pseudostromata. The pseudostromata contain lichexanthone, which is a lichen product that causes these structures to fluoresce yellow when lit with a long-wavelength UV light. The species epithet macrostomoides alludes to the similarity of the lichen with Astrothelium macrostomum, from which it differs by having larger ascospores. The characteristics of the lichen that distinguish it from others in genus Astrothelium are the diffusely pseudostromatic ascomata with erumpent pseudostromata, covered by thallus, each with a single group of fused ascomata; and the dimensions and form of the ascospores, which measure 80–110 by 17–25 μm, and have from five to seven septa.

== See also ==
- List of lichens of Brazil
