= Astrothelium quintannulare =

Scientific classification
- Kingdom: Fungi
- Division: Ascomycota
- Class: Dothideomycetes
- Order: Trypetheliales
- Family: Trypetheliaceae
- Genus: Astrothelium
- Species: A. quintannulare

Binomial name
- Astrothelium quintannulare Aptroot (2022)

Species of lichen-forming fungus

Astrothelium quintannulare is a corticolous (bark-dwelling) lichen in the family Trypetheliaceae. Found only in a small area of mountainous Atlantic Forest in southeastern Brazil, this species is distinguished by the white rings that encircle the tiny openings (ostioles) on its fruiting bodies. It produces ascospores divided into five segments, a characteristic that distinguishes it from its close relative A. annulare, which has three-segmented spores.

== Taxonomy ==
Astrothelium quintannulare was described in 2022 by André Aptroot from material collected on tree bark in montane rainforest at Santuário do Caraça, Minas Gerais, Brazil, at an elevation of 1,200 to 1,400 m (3,900 to 4,600 ft). The type specimen (Aptroot 51906 & L.A. dos Santos) is deposited in the herbarium of the Instituto de Botânica (ISE), with an isotype (duplicate) in the herbarium of the Federal University of Mato Grosso do Sul (CGMS). The species was segregated from the morphologically similar Astrothelium annulare: both have immersed, globose ascomata with apical ostioles surrounded by a small whitish ring, but A. annulare has 3-septate ascospores, whereas A. quintannulare has consistently 5-septate ascospores that differ in size. No lichen substances were detected by thin-layer chromatography, and the hamathecium is clear rather than inspersed, characters that further support its recognition as a distinct species.

== Description ==
The thallus of Astrothelium quintannulare forms a dull, pale olive-green crust up to about 10 cm (3.9 in) across and around 0.2 mm thick, lacking a distinct marginal prothallus. The ascomata are globose, 0.7–1.1 mm in diameter, mostly immersed in the thallus and not grouped into pseudostromata. Each ascoma has a single apical ostiole that appears brown to black and is characteristically encircled by a narrow whitish ring about 0.1 mm wide. The hamathecium is not inspersed with oil droplets. Ascospores are produced eight per ascus; they are hyaline, long-ellipsoid, 5-septate, and measure 57–61 × 18–22 μm, without any surrounding gelatinous sheath and showing no iodine staining reaction. Pycnidia were not observed in the type material. Standard spot tests on the thallus are negative (UV−, C−, K−, KC−, P−), and no secondary metabolites were detected by thin-layer chromatography.

== Habitat and distribution ==
Astrothelium quintannulare is known only from its type locality in the Santuário do Caraça area of Minas Gerais, southeastern Brazil. It was found growing on tree bark in montane Atlantic Forest at 1,200 to 1,400 m (3,900 to 4,600 ft) elevation. Within this habitat it appears as scattered patches on trunks in humid forest, and no occurrences have yet been reported outside this region. A national checklist published in 2025 likewise recorded no additional occurrences.
