= Astrothelium flavum =

Scientific classification
- Kingdom: Fungi
- Division: Ascomycota
- Class: Dothideomycetes
- Order: Trypetheliales
- Family: Trypetheliaceae
- Genus: Astrothelium
- Species: A. flavum

Binomial name
- Astrothelium flavum Aptroot & M.Cáceres (2016)

Species of lichen-forming fungus

Astrothelium flavum is a species of lichen-forming fungus in the family Trypetheliaceae. It was formally described as a new species in 2016 by André Aptroot and Marcela Cáceres. It is known only from Brazil, where it grows on the smooth bark of trees in primary rainforest. The species was described from material collected in Parque Natural Municipal de Porto Velho, Rondônia, at about 100 m (330 ft) elevation. No additional collections had been reported from Brazil as of 2025.

The lichen has a smooth, somewhat shiny thallus that is olive-green to olive-gray, with a narrow violet-brown prothallus line at the margin. Its fruiting bodies are immersed in small groups within slightly raised, bright yellow pseudostromata that are irregular, sometimes forming linear to reticulate patterns. Ascospores are colorless, 3-septate, and fusiform, measuring 16–18 × 6–7 μm. Chemical tests indicate an anthraquinone (probably parietin) in the pseudostromata (UV+ red; K+ blood red), while the thallus itself is UV− and K−. A. flavum resembles Astrothelium aeneum but differs in the strong contrast between the yellow stromata and the unpigmented thallus, as well as its smaller ascospores.

== See also ==
- List of lichens of Brazil
