= Astrothelium flavomurisporum =

Scientific classification
- Kingdom: Fungi
- Division: Ascomycota
- Class: Dothideomycetes
- Order: Trypetheliales
- Family: Trypetheliaceae
- Genus: Astrothelium
- Species: A. flavomurisporum

Binomial name
- Astrothelium flavomurisporum Aptroot & M.Cáceres (2016)

Species of lichen-forming fungus

Astrothelium flavomurisporum is a species of corticolous (bark-dwelling), crustose lichen in the family Trypetheliaceae. Found in Brazil, it was formally described as a new species in 2016 by lichenologists André Aptroot and Marcela Cáceres. The type specimen was collected by the authors from the Estação Ecológica de Cuniã (north-northeast of Porto Velho, Rondônia), in a low-altitude primary rainforest. The lichen has a smooth and somewhat shiny, olive-green thallus that lacks a prothallus and covers areas of up to 7 cm (2.8 in) in diameter. The ascomata are pear-shaped (pyriform), measuring 0.5–0.7 mm in diameter, and typically aggregate in groups of two to five, usually quite immersed in the bark tissue. Ascospores are hyaline, ellipsoid, and muriform (divided into many compartment by both longitudinal and transverse septa); they measure 165–200 by 28–35 μm and have a thickened central septum. The presence of the lichen does not induce the formation of galls in the host. Thin-layer chromatography did not reveal the presence of any lichen products in the collected lichen samples. The characteristics that distinguish Astrothelium flavomurisporum from other members of Astrothelium include the dispersed groups of fused, immersed (barely visible) ascomata; and the median thickening of the ascospores.

== See also ==
- List of lichens of Brazil
