= Astrothelium rubrocrystallinum =

Scientific classification
- Kingdom: Fungi
- Division: Ascomycota
- Class: Dothideomycetes
- Order: Trypetheliales
- Family: Trypetheliaceae
- Genus: Astrothelium
- Species: A. rubrocrystallinum

Binomial name
- Astrothelium rubrocrystallinum Aptroot & M.Cáceres (2016)

Species of lichen

Astrothelium rubrocrystallinum is a species of corticolous (bark-dwelling), crustose lichen in the family Trypetheliaceae, first described in 2016. It is found in Brazil.

== Taxonomy ==
The species Astrothelium rubrocrystallinum was formally described by the lichenologists André Aptroot and Marcela Eugenia da Silva Cáceres in 2016. The type specimen was collected in Mata do Junco, Santa Luzia do Itanhy, Sergipe, Brazil, at an elevation of approximately 150 m (490 ft), on 15 April 2011, by the second author.

== Description ==
The thallus of Astrothelium rubrocrystallinum is bullate, smooth, somewhat shiny, and continuous, covering areas up to 5 cm in diameter and about 0.2 mm thick. It is olive-brown in colour, surrounded by a black prothallus line approximately 0.2 mm wide, and does not induce gall formation on the host bark. The ascomata are roughly spherical, measuring 0.30–0.45 mm in diameter, mostly found in groups or lines of 2–5 in poorly distinguished pseudostromata. These pseudostromata are mostly distinctly raised above the thallus and are of thallus colour. Inside, there is a dense layer of red crystals about 0.2 mm wide around the ascoma wall, visible as dark granules through the hyaline cortex around the ostiole. The wall is black all around, up to 50 μm thick. Ostioles are apical, not fused, flat, black, and surrounded by an ochraceous ring of about 0.2 mm, which sometimes has a grey margin. The hamathecium is inspersed with hyaline oil globules. Asci contain eight ascospores each. Ascospores are hyaline, contains three septa, and have a fusiform shape. They measure 22–27 by 7–9 μm and have rounded ends and diamond-shaped lumina. They are not surrounded by a gelatinous layer. Pycnidia were not observed to occur in this species.

Astrothelium rubrocrystallinum belongs to the Astrothelium annulare group and is characterised by the copious red crystals in a thick layer around the ascomata. It is most closely related to Astrothelium buckii, but differs in having shorter ascospores with typical dimensions of 37–47 by 14–16 μm.

== Chemistry ==
The thallus surface of Astrothelium rubrocrystallinum is UV negative. The crystals in the pseudostroma medulla react K+ (purple). Thin-layer chromatography analysis reveals the presence of an unidentified anthraquinone substance.

== Habitat and distribution ==
This species is found on the smooth bark of trees in the Atlantic Forest and at the time of its publication was known only from Brazil.
