= Astrothelium subinterjectum =

Scientific classification
- Kingdom: Fungi
- Division: Ascomycota
- Class: Dothideomycetes
- Order: Trypetheliales
- Family: Trypetheliaceae
- Genus: Astrothelium
- Species: A. subinterjectum

Binomial name
- Astrothelium subinterjectum Lücking, M.P.Nelsen & Jungbluth (2016)
- Type locality: Fazenda Palmeira da Serra, Brazil

Species of lichen-forming fungus

Astrothelium subinterjectum is a species of lichen-forming fungus in the family Trypetheliaceae. The lichen forms an olive-green crust on tree bark with an uneven surface texture. Its reproductive structures are grouped together in rounded to irregular clusters that are covered by greenish tissue and share common openings surrounded by whitish zones. These clusters fluoresce yellow to orange-yellow under ultraviolet light while the surrounding lichen body does not. The species is found in gallery forests within Cerrado landscapes of Brazil, where it has been recorded from São Paulo, Acre, and Mato Grosso states.

== Taxonomy ==
Astrothelium subinterjectum was described as a new species by Robert Lücking, Matthew Nelsen, and Pedro Jungbluth. The type was collected in Brazil (São Paulo state) at Fazenda Palmeira da Serra near Pratânia, where it was found growing on bark in a gallery forest within a Cerrado landscape at about 715 m (2,346 ft) elevation.

The species is distinguished from A. obtectum by its smaller pseudostromata and smaller ascospores, and from A. interjectum by having diffuse pseudostromata as well as smaller ascospores. The specific epithet subinterjectum refers to its similarity to A. interjectum. The species has been considered closely related to A. obtectum, but is generally smaller in most structures and produces markedly smaller spores. It also resembles species such as A. crassum and A. variolosum, but differs in its broad, erumpent, diffuse pseudostromata, in having UV-positive pseudostromata, and in having a thallus that does not fluoresce under ultraviolet light.

== Description ==
The thallus is crustose and grows on bark, forming a continuous olive-green patch up to about 10 cm (4 in) across. Its surface is uneven. In cross section, it has a cartilage-like cortex, a photobiont layer positioned near the surface, and an indistinct medulla immersed within the modified outer bark.

The perithecia (flask-shaped fruiting bodies) are aggregated, typically five to eight together, in rounded to irregular, diffuse pseudostromata. The pseudostromata are about 2–3 mm in diameter, erumpent, and up to about 1.2 mm thick, and are covered by an olive-green thallus layer up to the shared ostioles. The ostioles are fused and eccentric, forming one to several shared openings. They are papillate and about 0.2–0.4 mm across, appearing black with a whitish surrounding zone. Individual perithecia are pear-shaped and about 0.4–0.5 mm wide and up to 1 mm high. The excipulum is carbonized and about 30–60 μm thick, and the spaces between perithecia are filled with amorphous orange-brown tissue. The hamathecium consists of densely interwoven, net-like paraphyses embedded in a clear gelatinous matrix (iodine staining negative, or IKI−), and the ostiolar channel is also clear.

Each ascus contains eight ascospores. The ascospores are hyaline, spindle-shaped, and three-septate, with distosepta and diamond-shaped lumina, measuring about 20–25 × 7–9 μm (IKI−). The pseudostromata are thinly covered with lichexanthone and fluoresce yellow to orange-yellow under ultraviolet light, while the surrounding thallus is UV-negative.

== Habitat and distribution ==
Astrothelium subinterjectum is known from southeastern Brazil. The type collection was made in São Paulo state at Fazenda Palmeira da Serra near Pratânia, where it grew on bark in gallery forest within a Cerrado region at about 715 m (2,346 ft) elevation. It has since been recorded from two other Brazilian states, Acre and Mato Grosso.
