= Astrothelium squamosum =

Scientific classification
- Kingdom: Fungi
- Division: Ascomycota
- Class: Dothideomycetes
- Order: Trypetheliales
- Family: Trypetheliaceae
- Genus: Astrothelium
- Species: A. squamosum

Binomial name
- Astrothelium squamosum Aptroot (2022)
- Holotype: Santuário do Caraça, Minas Gerais, Brazil

Species of lichen-forming fungus

Astrothelium squamosum is a corticolous (bark-dwelling) lichen in the family Trypetheliaceae. Described in 2022 from specimens collected in mountain rainforest in Minas Gerais, southeastern Brazil, this species is characterized by its unusual growth form of isolated glossy scales and exceptionally long ascospores divided into 14–17 segments. Unlike most related species, its brown fruiting bodies emerge directly from the bark between the lichen scales rather than being grouped together in raised structures. Known only from its type locality in the Santuário do Caraça area, it grows on tree bark in humid forests at elevations of 1,200 to 1,400 m (3,900 to 4,600 ft).

== Taxonomy ==
Astrothelium squamosum was described in 2022 by André Aptroot from material collected on tree bark in rainforest at Santuário do Caraça, Minas Gerais, Brazil, at elevations of 1,200 to 1,400 m (3,900 to 4,600 ft). The holotype (Aptroot 51260 & L.A. dos Santos) is deposited in the herbarium of the Instituto de Botânica (ISE), with an isotype (duplicate) in the herbarium of the Federal University of Mato Grosso do Sul (CGMS). Within Astrothelium, the species was compared to A. puiggarii: both have brown, emergent ascomata on bark, but A. puiggarii has muriform (multichambered) ascospores, whereas A. squamosum has long, narrowly ellipsoid, multi-septate ascospores that are 14–17-septate and significantly larger than those of A. puiggarii. These spore characters, together with the squamulose thallus, were used to justify its recognition as a distinct species, and it is placed in the world key to the genus in the couplet dealing with squamulose species with long, transversely septate ascospores.

== Description ==
The thallus of Astrothelium squamosum is formed by isolated squamules that create glossy patches up to about 10 cm (3.9 in) across; the squamules are olivaceous green and not bordered by any conspicuous prothallus. Individual squamules measure 0.6–1.7 × 0.5–1.6 mm, are lobate and irregularly convex, and are 0.3–0.6 mm thick, with most of the lower surface attached to the bark. The ascomata are pyriform, 0.4–0.8 mm in diameter, brown, and emerge directly from the bark in the gaps between the thallus squamules, rather than being grouped into pseudostromata. Ostioles are apical, single and black. The hamathecium is not inspersed with oil droplets. Ascospores are produced eight per ascus; they are hyaline, long-ellipsoid, 14–17-septate, and measure 114–127 × 23–26 μm, give a violet staining reaction with iodine (IKI+), and lack any surrounding gelatinous sheath. Pycnidia have not been observed. Standard spot tests on the thallus are negative (UV−, C−, P−, K−), and thin-layer chromatography has not detected any characteristic secondary metabolites.

== Habitat and distribution ==
Astrothelium squamosum is known only from its type locality in the Santuário do Caraça area of Minas Gerais in southeastern Brazil. It grows on tree bark in humid rainforest at elevations of about 1,200 to 1,400 m (3,900 to 4,600 ft), where it forms patches of squamules with interspersed ascomata on trunks. Apart from the type collection, no confirmed records have been reported from outside Brazil. No additional occurrences had been reported as of 2025.
