= Astrothelium supraclandestinum =

Scientific classification
- Domain: Eukaryota
- Kingdom: Fungi
- Division: Ascomycota
- Class: Dothideomycetes
- Order: Trypetheliales
- Family: Trypetheliaceae
- Genus: Astrothelium
- Species: A. supraclandestinum

Binomial name
- Astrothelium supraclandestinum Aptroot M.Cáceres (2016)

Species of lichen

Astrothelium supraclandestinum is a species of lichen in the family Trypetheliaceae. This lichen species is closely related to Astrothelium subclandestinum, but differs in its hamathecium, which is not inspersed. The species is widespread and has been observed in several countries across different continents.

== Taxonomy ==
Astrothelium supraclandestinum was formally described by André Aptroot and Marcela Cáceres in 2016. The species is closely related to Astrothelium subclandestinum, which has an inspersed hamathecium.

== Description ==
The thallus of Astrothelium supraclandestinum is corticate, smooth to somewhat bullate, somewhat shiny, continuous, and greenish-grey, covering areas up to 7 cm (2.8 in) in diameter. It is approximately 0.1 mm thick and surrounded by a prothallus line, about 0.2 mm wide. The lichen infrequently induces somewhat spherical galls on the host bark.

Ascomata are pyriform, measuring about 0.5–0.8 mm in diameter, and are mostly aggregated in groups of 2–5, immersed in the bark tissue below pseudostromata. Pseudostromata are indistinctly delimited, not corticate, ochraceous or concolorous with the thallus, not much raised above the thallus, and up to 2 mm in diameter. The wall is black and up to about 60 μm thick. Ostioles are eccentric, fused, flat to convex, and brown to black. The hamathecium is not inspersed with oil globules. The asci contain 8 ascospores, which are hyaline, 5-septate, fusiform, and measure 50–75 by 14–22 μm.

In terms of standard chemical spot tests, the thallus surface is UV−, and the thallus medulla is K−. Thin-layer chromatography shows no secondary substances detected.

== Habitat and distribution ==
Astrothelium supraclandestinum is found on smooth bark of trees in primary forests. The species has been reported in Brazil, Venezuela, Australia, and Papua New Guinea.
