= Astrothelium megatropicum =

Scientific classification
- Kingdom: Fungi
- Division: Ascomycota
- Class: Dothideomycetes
- Order: Trypetheliales
- Family: Trypetheliaceae
- Genus: Astrothelium
- Species: A. megatropicum

Binomial name
- Astrothelium megatropicum Aptroot (2016)

Species of lichen

Astrothelium megatropicum is a species of corticolous (bark-dwelling), crustose lichen in the family Trypetheliaceae. Found in Guyana, it was formally described as a new species in 2016 by Dutch lichenologist André Aptroot. The type specimen was collected by Harrie Sipman near Paramakatoi village (Potaro-Siparuni region) at an altitude of 800 metres (2,600 ft); there, it was found growing on smooth tree bark. The lichen has a smooth and somewhat shiny, pale ochraceous-green thallus with a cortex and a thin (about 0.1 mm wide) black prothallus line. It covers areas of up to 7 cm (2.8 in) in diameter. The presence of the lichen does not induce the formation of galls in the host plant. No lichen products were detected from collected specimens using thin-layer chromatography. The combination of characteristics of the lichen that distinguish it from others in Astrothelium are its uneven to verrucose thallus; its confluent ascomata, which are erumpent to prominent and exposed, with gently to steeply sloping sides; and the dimensions of its ascospores (100–120 by 30–35 μm). The spores, which have three septa and diamond-shaped cavities, are the longest 3-septate ascospores in the Trypetheliaceae.
