= Astrothelium bullatum =

Scientific classification
- Kingdom: Fungi
- Division: Ascomycota
- Class: Dothideomycetes
- Order: Trypetheliales
- Family: Trypetheliaceae
- Genus: Astrothelium
- Species: A. bullatum

Binomial name
- Astrothelium bullatum Flakus & Aptroot (2016)

Species of lichen

Astrothelium bullatum is a rare species of corticolous (bark-dwelling) lichen in the family Trypetheliaceae. Found in Bolivia, it was formally described as a new species in 2016 by lichenologists Adam Flakus and André Aptroot. The type specimen was collected in the Cotapata National Park and Integrated Management Natural Area (La Paz Department) at an altitude of 1,700 m (5,600 ft); there, in a mountainous Yungas cloud forest, it was found growing on bark. It is only known to occur at the type locality. The lichen has a strongly bullate (convex and swollen) thallus, and it is this feature to which the species epithet bullatum refers.
