= Astrothelium stromatocinnamomeum =

Scientific classification
- Kingdom: Fungi
- Division: Ascomycota
- Class: Dothideomycetes
- Order: Trypetheliales
- Family: Trypetheliaceae
- Genus: Astrothelium
- Species: A. stromatocinnamomeum

Binomial name
- Astrothelium stromatocinnamomeum Aptroot (2022)
- Holotype: Santuário do Caraça, Minas Gerais, Brazil

Species of lichen-forming fungus

Astrothelium stromatocinnamomeum is a corticolous (bark-dwelling) lichen in the family Trypetheliaceae. Described in 2022 from mountainous rainforest in southeastern Brazil, it is characterized by conspicuous orange pseudostromata containing groups of fused ascomata and 3-septate ascospores. The pseudostromata contain an anthraquinone pigment that is absent from the surrounding thallus, and the species is known only from humid forest at Santuário do Caraça in Minas Gerais, Brazil.

== Taxonomy ==
Astrothelium stromatocinnamomeum was described in 2022 by André Aptroot from material collected on tree bark in rainforest at Santuário do Caraça, Minas Gerais, Brazil, at an elevation of 1,200 to 1,400 m (3,900 to 4,600 ft). The holotype (Aptroot 52080 & L.A. dos Santos) is deposited in the herbarium of the Instituto de Botânica (ISE), with an isotype (duplicate) in the herbarium of the Federal University of Mato Grosso do Sul (CGMS). Within Astrothelium, it was compared to A. cinnamomeum: both species form orange pseudostromata with 3-septate ascospores, but A. cinnamomeum has pseudostromata that contain only a single group of ascomata, whereas A. stromatocinnamomeum has many groups of fused ascomata in each pseudostroma. The anthraquinone pigment restricted to the pseudostromata and the absence of an inspersed hamathecium further support its recognition as a distinct species.

== Description ==
The thallus of Astrothelium stromatocinnamomeum is slightly shiny and ochraceous green, with an uneven surface, and covers areas of up to 8 cm (3.1 in) in diameter while remaining about 0.1–0.3 mm thick; it is not bordered by a distinct prothallus. The ascomata are pyriform, 0.2–0.4 mm in diameter, and occur in groups of 3–10 immersed in well-developed pseudostromata. These pseudostromata are sessile and convex, becoming somewhat flattened at the center in larger structures, orange in color, rounded to lobate, and measure 1–5 × 1–4 mm; each contains several groups of fused ascomata with joined ostioles. The ostioles are off-center, fused and black. The hamathecium is clear and not inspersed with oil droplets. Ascospores are produced eight per ascus; they are hyaline, long-ellipsoid, 3-septate, measure 27–30 × 9–11 μm, are IKI-negative, and lack any surrounding gelatinous sheath. Pycnidia have not been observed. In standard spot tests the thallus is UV−, C−, K− and P−, whereas the pseudostromata show a UV+ (red) fluorescence; thin-layer chromatography indicates an anthraquinone as the principal lichen substance.

== Habitat and distribution ==
Astrothelium stromatocinnamomeum is known only from its type locality in the Santuário do Caraça area of Minas Gerais in southeastern Brazil. It grows on tree bark in humid rainforest at elevations of about 1,200 to 1,400 m (3,900 to 4,600 ft), where it forms ochraceous thalli bearing conspicuous orange pseudostromata on trunks. As of its original publication, it had not been reported outside Brazil. No additional occurrences had been reported as of 2025.
