= Astrothelium inspersotuberculosum =

Scientific classification
- Kingdom: Fungi
- Division: Ascomycota
- Class: Dothideomycetes
- Order: Trypetheliales
- Family: Trypetheliaceae
- Genus: Astrothelium
- Species: A. inspersotuberculosum

Binomial name
- Astrothelium inspersotuberculosum Flakus & Aptroot (2016)

Species of lichen

Astrothelium inspersotuberculosum is a species of corticolous (bark-dwelling) lichen in the family Trypetheliaceae. Found in Bolivia, it was formally described as a new species in 2016 by lichenologists Adam Flakus and André Aptroot. The type specimen was collected near Florida village in Hacienda Chirapa (José Miguel de Velasco Province, Santa Cruz Department); there, at an altitude of 200 m (660 ft), it was found in a lowland Amazon forest. It is somewhat similar to Astrothelium tuberculosum, but unlike that species, it has an inspersed hamathecium (i.e., interpenetrated with granules). Both this characteristic and its resemblance to its namesake are reflected in the species epithet inspersotuberculosum.
