= Astrothelium testudineum =

Scientific classification
- Domain: Eukaryota
- Kingdom: Fungi
- Division: Ascomycota
- Class: Dothideomycetes
- Order: Trypetheliales
- Family: Trypetheliaceae
- Genus: Astrothelium
- Species: A. testudineum

Binomial name
- Astrothelium testudineum Aptroot & M.Cáceres (2016)

Species of lichen

Astrothelium testudineum is a species of corticolous (bark-dwelling) lichen in the family Trypetheliaceae. It is found in Brazil.

== Taxonomy ==
The lichen was fornally described as a new species in 2016 by lichenologists André Aptroot and Marcela Cáceres. Astrothelium testudineum is most similar to A. leioplacum, but it can be distinguished by its hamathecium inspersion and larger ascospores.

== Description ==
The thallus of Astrothelium testudineum is thickly corticate, smooth, somewhat shiny, continuous, and ochraceous, covering areas up to cm in diameter. It is approximately 0.2 mm thick and surrounded by a black prothallus line, about 0.1 mm wide. The lichen does not induce gall formation on the host bark.

Ascomata are pyriform, measuring 0.5–0.9 mm in diameter, and are mostly aggregated in groups of 2–6, immersed in the thallus, without pseudostroma. The wall is carbonized all around, up to about 70 μm thick. Ostioles are eccentric, fused, and flat, with a brown colour. Hamathecium is densely inspersed with hyaline oil globules. Asci contain 8 ascospores, which are hyaline, densely muriform, broadly ellipsoid, and measure 50–65 by 23–27 μm.

In terms of standard chemical spot tests, the thallus surface of Astrothelium testudineum is UV−, and the thallus medulla is K−. Thin-layer chromatography shows no secondary substances detected.

== Habitat and distribution ==
Astrothelium testudineum is found on Hevea brasiliensis bark in plantations. The species is currently known only from Brazil.
