= Astrothelium clypeatum =

Scientific classification
- Kingdom: Fungi
- Division: Ascomycota
- Class: Dothideomycetes
- Order: Trypetheliales
- Family: Trypetheliaceae
- Genus: Astrothelium
- Species: A. clypeatum

Binomial name
- Astrothelium clypeatum Aptroot & Gueidan (2016)

Species of lichen

Astrothelium clypeatum is a species of corticolous (bark-dwelling) lichen in the family Trypetheliaceae. Found in Vietnam, it was formally described as a new species in 2016 by André Aptroot and Cécile Gueidan. The type specimen was collected from Cát Tiên National Park (Dong Nai Province); here it was found growing on the bark of some trees along a road. The lichen has an olive-green thallus that shows branched lines revealing the black prothallus underneath. No lichen products were detected in the species. The authors placed it in genus Astrothelium because of the "well-developed, corticate, rimose thallus", but acknowledge that it might belong to genus Pseudopyrenula. The species epithet clypeatum refers to the conical black ascomata, which have a pseudostromata resembling a clypeus (a shield-like growth).
