= Astrothelium curvatum =

Scientific classification
- Kingdom: Fungi
- Division: Ascomycota
- Class: Dothideomycetes
- Order: Trypetheliales
- Family: Trypetheliaceae
- Genus: Astrothelium
- Species: A. curvatum

Binomial name
- Astrothelium curvatum Aptroot & M.Cáceres (2016)

Species of lichen-forming fungus

Astrothelium curvatum is a species of corticolous lichen in the family Trypetheliaceae. Found in Brazil, it was described as a new species in 2016. It is characterised by its immersed pyriform ascomata with lateral ostioles and bent, muriform ascospores.

== Taxonomy ==
Astrothelium curvatum was formally described as a new species in 2016 by the lichenologists André Aptroot and Marcela Cáceres. The type specimen was collected in Sergipe, Brazil, at the Serra de Itabaiana National Park, on the southern slope at an elevation of approximately 400 m (1,300 ft). It was found by the authors on the bark of a tree in May 2014.

== Description ==
The thallus of Astrothelium curvatum is corticate, smooth, and somewhat shiny. It is continuous, covering areas up to 3 cm (1.2 in) in diameter and less than 0.1 mm thick. The colour is olive-green, surrounded by a black prothallus, and it does not induce gall formation on the host bark. The ascomata are pyriform, measuring 0.4–0.7 by 0.3–0.5 mm, and are single, immersed in the thallus, and mostly immersed in the bark. The wall around the ascomata is carbonised and can be up to 100 μm thick. The ostioles are lateral, not fused, and can be flat or depressed, with a brown colour. The hamathecium is interspersed with hyaline oil globules, and the asci contain 4–8 ascospores. These ascospores are hyaline, muriform, ellipsoid, usually bent, with rounded ends, measuring 74–90 by 25–34 μm. They do not have a distinctly thickened median septum and are not surrounded by a gelatinous layer.

Pycnidia have not been observed in this species. In terms of chemistry, the thallus surface is UV-negative, and the thallus medulla is K-negative. Thin-layer chromatography, a technique used to identify chemical substances, revealed that no secondary substances (lichen products) are detectable.

Astrothelium curvatum is characterized for its immersed pyriform ascomata with lateral ostioles and the curved muriform ascospores. It is most closely related to Astrothelium puiggarii . The main difference between these species is that A. puiggarii typically has two ascospores in the ascus compared to the 4–8 found in A. curvatum.

== Habitat and distribution ==
Astrothelium curvatum is found on the smooth bark of trees in the Atlantic rainforest. At the time of its original publication, it was known to occur only in its type locality in Brazil.

== See also ==
- List of lichens of Brazil
