= Astrothelium tetrasporum =

Scientific classification
- Domain: Eukaryota
- Kingdom: Fungi
- Division: Ascomycota
- Class: Dothideomycetes
- Order: Trypetheliales
- Family: Trypetheliaceae
- Genus: Astrothelium
- Species: A. tetrasporum

Binomial name
- Astrothelium tetrasporum Aptroot & M.Cáceres (2016)

Species of lichen

Astrothelium tetrasporum is a species of corticolous (bark-dwelling), crustose lichen in the family Trypetheliaceae, first described in 2016. It is found in Brazil.

== Taxonomy ==
Astrothelium tetrasporum was formally described by lichenologists by the André Aptroot and Marcela Eugenia da Silva Cáceres in 2016. The type specimen was collected near Pousada Mandala on SP-254 in Botucatu, São Paulo, Brazil, at an elevation of about 850 m (2,790 ft), on 9 September 2012.

== Description ==
The thallus of Astrothelium tetrasporum is corticate, discontinuous, and consists of sinuose to moniliform rows of spherical to slightly flattened bullate areas. These areas become locally almost like thick squamules, mostly consisting of a hyaline cortex up to 230 μm thick, somewhat shiny, covering areas up to 10 cm in diameter, and are olive-green in colour. Ascomata are pyriform (pear-shaped), measuring 0.7–1.3 mm in diameter, single, and immersed in the thallus. The wall is carbonized and up to 70 μm thick. Ostioles are apical to eccentric, not fused, erumpent, brown, and chimney-like. The hamathecium does not contain oil globules. Asci contain four ascospores each. Ascospores are hyaline, muriform, fusiform, measuring 145–175 by 30–35 μm, with rounded ends. When the spores are young, they have a markedly thickened median septum with two polar gelatinous caps approximately 5 μm thick. Pycnidia were not observed to occur in this species.

The thallus surface of Astrothelium tetrasporum is UV−, and the medulla does not react to potassium hydroxide (K−). Thin-layer chromatography analysis did not detect any secondary metabolites.

== Habitat and distribution ==
This species is found on the smooth bark of trees in dry forests, including a forest remnant in a botanical garden. At the time of its original publication, it was known to occur only in Brazil.
