= Astrothelium neodiplocarpum =

Scientific classification
- Kingdom: Fungi
- Division: Ascomycota
- Class: Dothideomycetes
- Order: Trypetheliales
- Family: Trypetheliaceae
- Genus: Astrothelium
- Species: A. neodiplocarpum

Binomial name
- Astrothelium neodiplocarpum Flakus, Kukwa & Aptroot (2016)

Species of lichen

Astrothelium neodiplocarpum is a species of corticolous (bark-dwelling) lichen in the family Trypetheliaceae. Found in Bolivia, it was formally described as a new species in 2016 by lichenologists Adam Flakus, Martin Kukwa, and André Aptroot. The type specimen was collected from Santa Catalina village above Tunkini in the Cotapata National Park and Integrated Management Natural Area (Nor Yungas Province, La Paz Department) at an altitude of 1,700 m (5,600 ft); there, in a Yungas mountainous cloud forest, it was found growing on bark. It is only known to occur in this habitat in Bolivia. The species epithet alludes to its similarity with Astrothelium diplocarpum, from which it differs by the absence of pigment in the medulla and in the amyloid staining reaction of its ascospores.
