= Astrothelium scoriothelium =

Scientific classification
- Kingdom: Fungi
- Division: Ascomycota
- Class: Dothideomycetes
- Order: Trypetheliales
- Family: Trypetheliaceae
- Genus: Astrothelium
- Species: A. scoriothelium

Binomial name
- Astrothelium scoriothelium Aptroot & Lücking (2016)

Synonyms
- Trypethelium scorioides Leight. (1866)

Species of lichen-forming fungus

Astrothelium scoriothelium is a species of crustose lichen-forming fungus in the family Trypetheliaceae. It was introduced as a replacement name (nomen novum) by André Aptroot and Robert Lücking for Trypethelium scorioides Leight. (1866), which was preoccupied by Astrothelium scorioides Nyl. (1867). The type collection of the replaced name is from Brazil (Amazonas), gathered by the English bryologist Richard Spruce; the holotype is maintained by the British Museum (BM). Another name applied to this lichen is Pseudopyrenula infuscatula var. tecomae Vain. (1915) (later recombined as Trypethelium infuscatulum var. tecomae), typified from specimens collected in Guadeloupe near Camp-Jacob.

The thallus is olive-green and has a thin outer layer, with an uneven, warty surface. Its fruiting bodies are mostly embedded in the thallus but can break through the surface, forming irregular blackish patches about 0.7–1.7 mm across. The pore-like openings are marked by pale rings. Each ascus contains eight colorless ascospores that are 3-septate (divided into four cells) and fusiform to ellipsoid in shape, measuring 36–39 × 11–12 μm. The spores show no iodine staining reaction (IKI−). No lichen substances have been detected by standard spot tests (UV−, K−) or thin-layer chromatography.

The species is neotropical in distribution, with reports from Guadeloupe, Venezuela, and Colombia. In Brazil, it has been recorded from Amazonas and Santa Catarina.
