= Astrothelium flavostiolatum =

Scientific classification
- Kingdom: Fungi
- Division: Ascomycota
- Class: Dothideomycetes
- Order: Trypetheliales
- Family: Trypetheliaceae
- Genus: Astrothelium
- Species: A. flavostiolatum

Binomial name
- Astrothelium flavostiolatum Aptroot (2016)

Species of lichen

Astrothelium flavostiolatum is a species of corticolous (bark-dwelling), crustose lichen in the family Trypetheliaceae. Found in Ecuador, it was formally described as a new species in 2016 by Dutch lichenologist André Aptroot. The type specimen was collected by Harrie Sipman from the Reserva Biológica San Francisco in the Andes of southern Ecuador (Zamora-Chinchipe Province) at an altitude of 2,020 m (6,630 ft); there, it was found in a rainforest growing on smooth tree bark. The lichen has an olive-green thallus with a cortex but lacking a prothallus, covering areas of up to 10 cm (4 in) in diameter. The thallus is covered with small wart-like structures (verrucae), and consists of swollen and distended (bullate) areas that coalesce, forming a continuous structure. The presence of the lichen does not induce the formation of galls in its host. A yellow anthraquinone is the only lichen product that was detected from the species using thin-layer chromatography. The group of characteristics of the lichen distinguishing it from others in Astrothelium are its irregular, bullate thallus; its solitary to confluent ascomata with yellowish ostiolar rims, and the coarse thallus verrucae.
