= Astrothelium quatuorseptatum =

Scientific classification
- Kingdom: Fungi
- Division: Ascomycota
- Class: Dothideomycetes
- Order: Trypetheliales
- Family: Trypetheliaceae
- Genus: Astrothelium
- Species: A. quatuorseptatum

Binomial name
- Astrothelium quatuorseptatum Aptroot & M.Cáceres (2016)

Species of lichen

Astrothelium quatuorseptatum is a species of corticolous (bark-dwelling) lichen in the family Trypetheliaceae. Found in Brazil, it was formally described as a new species in 2016 by André Aptroot and Marcela Cáceres. The type specimen was collected by the authors in the Estação Ecológica de Cuniã (Porto Velho, Rondônia), in a low-altitude primary rainforest. The lichen has a smooth and somewhat shiny, pale greenish-grey thallus that lacks a prothallus and covers areas of up to 7 cm (2.8 in) in diameter. The ascomata are pear-shaped (pyriform) and typically occur in groups of two to five, usually immersed in the bark tissue. The lichen does not react with any of the standard chemical spot tests, and thin-layer chromatography did not reveal the presence of any lichen products. The species epithet quatuorseptatum refers to the ascospores, which usually have four septa that divide the spore into distinct compartments. A. octosporum is quite similar in appearance, but that species has twice the number of septa in its spores, and it contains lichexanthone.
