= Astrothelium carassense =

Scientific classification
- Kingdom: Fungi
- Division: Ascomycota
- Class: Dothideomycetes
- Order: Trypetheliales
- Family: Trypetheliaceae
- Genus: Astrothelium
- Species: A. carassense

Binomial name
- Astrothelium carassense Lücking, M.P.Nelsen & Marcelli (2016)

Species of lichen-forming fungus

Astrothelium carassense is a species of corticolous (bark-dwelling), crustose lichen in the family Trypetheliaceae. Found in Brazil, it was formally described as a new species in 2016 by Robert Lücking, Matthew Nelsen, and Marcelo Marcelli. The type specimen was collected by the first author from the Santuário do Caraça (Reserva Particular do Patrimônio Natural, Minas Gerais), at an altitude between 1,300 and 1,400 m (4,300 and 4,600 ft). The lichen has an uneven to bumpy, pale olive-yellow thallus that covers areas of up to 10 cm (4 in) in diameter. The pseudostromata are covered with an orange anthraquinone compound. The species epithet carassense refers to the type locality. The characteristics of the lichen that distinguish it from others in genus Astrothelium are its pseudostromatic ascomata, which are erumpent, with an orange cover; and the dimensions and form of its ascospores, which are muriform and measure 100–170 by 30–40 μm. Astrothelium purpurascens is somewhat similar in appearance to A. carassense, but it lacks pseudostromatic pigment and has slightly smaller ascospores.

== See also ==
- List of lichens of Brazil
