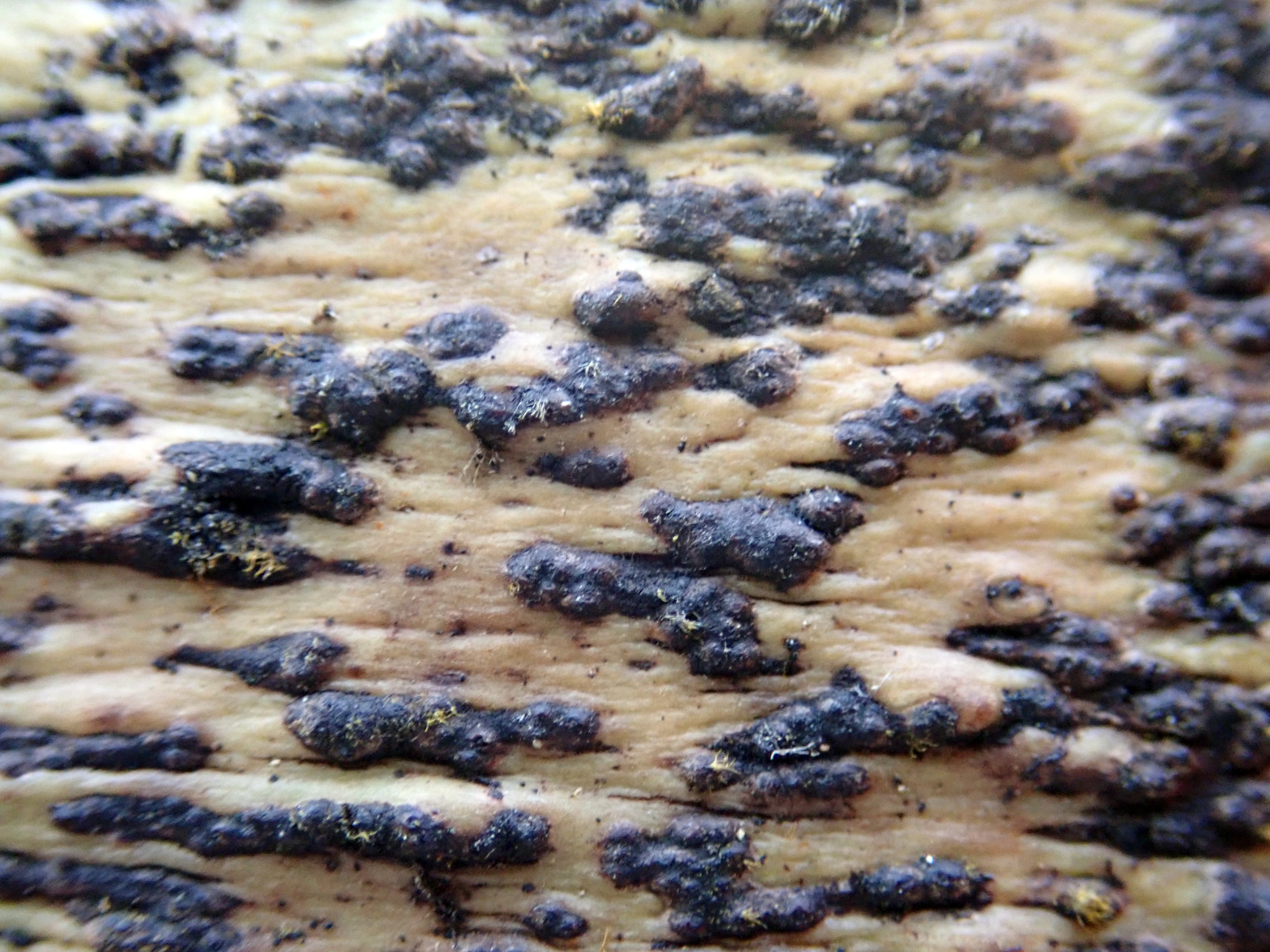

Scientific classification
- Kingdom: Fungi
- Division: Ascomycota
- Class: Dothideomycetes
- Order: Trypetheliales
- Family: Trypetheliaceae
- Genus: Astrothelium
- Species: A. nigratum

Binomial name
- Astrothelium nigratum (Müll.Arg.) Aptroot & Lücking (2016)

Synonyms
- Astrothelium minus var. nigratum Müll.Arg. (1885)

= Astrothelium nigratum =

Species of lichen

Astrothelium nigratum is a species of corticolous (bark-dwelling) crustose lichen in the family Trypetheliaceae. It was originally described in 1885 as a variety of Astrothelium minus from specimens collected in Cuba, but was later elevated to full species status. The species is characterised by its distinctive fruiting structures that develop a reddish to saffron-coloured powder before turning almost entirely black at maturity, which gives the species its name meaning 'blackened'.

== Taxonomy ==
The species was originally introduced by Johannes Müller Argoviensis in 1885 as Astrothelium minus var. nigratum, based on Cuban material (Wright s.n.; holotype in G, isotype FH-TUCK 3982). Müller placed the variety in his section for taxa with four-celled spores (Sporae 4-loculares) and gave a short Latin diagnosis. He described a thin, smooth, olive-yellow thallus and scattered, small, conical stromata about 0.5 mm in diameter. These mounds were described as being at first the same color as the thallus, then developing a broad reddish- to saffron-colored powder on the upper surface; the base became paler in places, and the tip opened by a black pore exposing black fruiting tissue. He noted eight hyaline, oblong-ellipsoid spores per ascus, usually in two rows (biseriate), each spore four-celled and measuring roughly 20–25 × 8–10 μm. He distinguished the variety "β nigratum" by its stromata turning almost entirely black at maturity—hence the epithet nigratum.

The taxon was later raised to species rank and combined as Astrothelium nigratum by André Aptroot and Robert Lücking (comb. et stat. nov.).

== Description ==
The thallus is corticate (a thin, protective cortex overlies the surface) olive-brown, and smooth to slightly uneven. The spore-bearing structures (ascomata) are trypethelioid: each has a single chamber that opens through an apical pore (ostiole). They are arranged in diffuse, pseudostromatic clusters, about 0.2–0.3 mm in diameter, initially immersed in the thallus and then breaking through (erumpent); when exposed they appear brown-black. The internal tissue between asci (hamathecium) is clear. Each ascus contains eight colorless (hyaline) spores that are 3-septate and spindle-to-ellipsoid in outline, measuring roughly 20–27 × 7–10 μm; they do not react with iodine (IKI−).

Standard spot tests are negative on both the thallus and the pseudostromata (UV−, K−), and thin-layer chromatography detects no secondary metabolites.

== Habitat and distribution ==
Astrothelium nigratum has a neotropical distribution. It was previously reported only from Cuba but has also been collected in Puerto Rico (Maricao State Forest) and in Guyana.
