= Astrothelium sordithecium =

Scientific classification
- Kingdom: Fungi
- Division: Ascomycota
- Class: Dothideomycetes
- Order: Trypetheliales
- Family: Trypetheliaceae
- Genus: Astrothelium
- Species: A. sordithecium

Binomial name
- Astrothelium sordithecium Lücking, M.P.Nelsen & Marcelli (2016)
- Type locality: Serra do Caraça, Brazil

Species of lichen-forming fungus

Astrothelium sordithecium is a species of lichen-forming fungus in the family Trypetheliaceae. The lichen forms an olive-green to gray-green crusty patch on tree bark with a smooth to uneven surface. Its reproductive structures are grouped together in well-defined rounded clusters covered by a whitish layer, and these clusters fluoresce yellow under ultraviolet light while the surrounding lichen body does not. The species is known only from Atlantic Forest in southeastern Brazil, where it grows on bark in disturbed remnants of gallery forest along streams.

== Taxonomy ==
Astrothelium sordithecium was described as a new species by Robert Lücking, Matthew Nelsen, and Marcelo Marcelli. The type was collected in southeastern Brazil (Minas Gerais, Serra do Caraça) in Atlantic rainforest at about 1,300–1,400 m (4,300–4,600 ft) elevation.

The species is distinguished from the similar A. leucothelium by having an inspersed hymenium (the spore-bearing tissue is filled with droplets) and by lacking lichexanthone on the thallus surface outside the pseudostromata. The specific epithet sordithecium refers to the yellow-brown droplets that densely fill the hamathecium. The species has been compared with A. variolosum and related taxa; A. variolosum has smaller ascospores and lichexanthone covering the entire thallus, while A. leucothelium has a clear hamathecium and also has lichexanthone in the thallus.

== Description ==
The thallus of A. sordithecium is crustose and grows on bark, forming a continuous patch up to about 5 cm (2 in) across. Its surface is smooth to uneven and olive-green to gray-green. In cross section, it has a thick, cartilage-like cortex, a distinct photobiont layer positioned near the surface, and a distinct medulla that is partly immersed in the outer bark and encrusted with numerous small gray crystals.

The perithecia (flask-shaped fruiting bodies) are aggregated, with about four to eight grouped in rounded to slightly irregular, well-defined pseudostromata. The pseudostromata are about 1–2 mm across, prominent, and up to about 1 mm high, and are covered by a whitish thallus layer up to the shared ostioles. The ostioles are fused and eccentric, forming one to three shared openings near the center. From above they appear as small black dots about 0.08–0.10 mm across and lie along narrow, triangular slits in the whitish covering that show as dark brown lines. Individual perithecia are pear-shaped, about 0.4–0.5 mm wide and up to about 0.6 mm high. The excipulum is carbonized and about 30–50 μm thick, and the spaces between perithecia are filled with amorphous orange-brown tissue.

The hamathecium consists of densely interwoven, net-like paraphyses embedded in a gelatinous matrix that is densely filled with dull yellowish-brown oil droplets (no staining in Lugol's iodine, or IKI−); the ostiolar channel is also inspersed. Asci contain eight hyaline, spindle-shaped ascospores that are three-septate, with distosepta and diamond-shaped lumina, measuring about 30–40 × 10–12 μm (IKI−). The pseudostromata cortex contains lichexanthone and fluoresces yellow under long-wavelength ultraviolet light (UV+ yellow), while lichexanthone is absent from the exposed thallus surface outside the pseudostromata.

== Habitat and distribution ==
Astrothelium sordithecium is known from Atlantic Forest in the Serra do Caraça in Minas Gerais, Brazil. The type collection was made in disturbed remnants of gallery forest along a small river leading toward the Cascatinha Waterfall, where it grew on bark beside the Belchior trail at about 1,300–1,400 m elevation. As of the original publication, the species was known only from the type locality area in Minas Gerais. No additional Brazilian records had been reported as on 2025.
