= Astrothelium lucidothallinum =

Scientific classification
- Kingdom: Fungi
- Division: Ascomycota
- Class: Dothideomycetes
- Order: Trypetheliales
- Family: Trypetheliaceae
- Genus: Astrothelium
- Species: A. lucidothallinum

Binomial name
- Astrothelium lucidothallinum Aptroot (2016)

Species of lichen

Astrothelium lucidothallinum is a species of corticolous (bark-dwelling), crustose lichen in the family Trypetheliaceae. Found in Guyana, it was formally described as a new species in 2016 by Dutch lichenologist André Aptroot. The type specimen was collected about 30 km (19 miles) south of Aishalton (Upper Takutu-Upper Essequibo) at an altitude of 300 m (980 ft); there, it was found in a savanna growing on smooth tree bark. The lichen has a smooth and somewhat shiny, pale yellowish grey thallus with a cortex and a thin (0.1 mm wide) black prothallus line. It covers areas of up to 9 cm (3.5 in) in diameter. The thallus contains lichexanthone, a lichen product that causes it to fluoresce yellow when lit with a long-wavelength UV light. The combination of characteristics of the lichen that distinguish it from others in Astrothelium are: the presence of lichexanthone only in the thallus; the indistinctly pseudostromatic ascomata, with erumpent pseudostromata—whitish in colour but lacking a sharp outline; and the dimensions of the ascospores (70–90 by 18–20 μm) as well as their number per ascus (eight).
