= Astrothelium pseudomegalophthalmum =

Scientific classification
- Kingdom: Fungi
- Division: Ascomycota
- Class: Dothideomycetes
- Order: Trypetheliales
- Family: Trypetheliaceae
- Genus: Astrothelium
- Species: A. pseudomegalophthalmum

Binomial name
- Astrothelium pseudomegalophthalmum Aptroot (2016)

Species of lichen

Astrothelium pseudomegalophthalmum is a species of corticolous (bark-dwelling), crustose lichen in the family Trypetheliaceae. Found in Colombia, it was formally described as a new species in 2016 by Dutch lichenologist André Aptroot. The type specimen was collected from Araracuara (Amazonas Department) at an altitude of 300 m (980 ft); there, in a savanna forest, it was found growing on smooth tree bark. The lichen has a smooth and somewhat shiny, pale olive-green thallus with a cortex and a thin black prothallus line. The lichen thallus covers areas of up to 7 cm (2.8 in) in diameter, and its presence does not induce the formation of galls in the host plant. No lichen products were detected in collected samples using thin-layer chromatography. The characteristics of the lichen that distinguish it from others in Astrothelium are its solitary to irregularly confluent ascomata, which are erumpent with an exposed upper part. Its ascospores have seven septa and measure 152–166 by 32–37 μm. Its namesake species, A. megalophthalmum, also has large spores with seven septa.
