= Astrothelium tanianum =

Scientific classification
- Kingdom: Fungi
- Division: Ascomycota
- Class: Dothideomycetes
- Order: Trypetheliales
- Family: Trypetheliaceae
- Genus: Astrothelium
- Species: A. tanianum

Binomial name
- Astrothelium tanianum Aptroot & Sipman (2019)

Species of lichen

Astrothelium tanianum is a species of corticolous (bark-dwelling) lichen in the family Trypetheliaceae. Found in Malaysia, it was formally described as a new species in 2019 by lichenologists André Aptroot and Harrie Sipman. The type specimen was collected from the Gunung Pulai Forest Reserve (Johor) at an altitude of 150 m (490 ft). The lichen has a shiny and olive-green, strongly convex and swollen (bullate) thallus with a cortex, which covers an area up to 3 cm (1 in) in diameter. It has roughly spherical ascomata, measuring 0.7–1.3 mm in diameter, which occur singly in tiny warts (verrucae) on the thallus surface. The ascospores are hyaline with typically about 11 septa (ranging from 9 to 15) and measure 75–100 by 20–22 μm. The specific epithet tanianum honours Philippine bryologist Benito Tan (1946–2016), one of the collectors of the type.
