= Astrothelium rubrostiolatum =

Scientific classification
- Kingdom: Fungi
- Division: Ascomycota
- Class: Dothideomycetes
- Order: Trypetheliales
- Family: Trypetheliaceae
- Genus: Astrothelium
- Species: A. rubrostiolatum

Binomial name
- Astrothelium rubrostiolatum M.Cáceres & Aptroot (2017)

Species of lichen

Astrothelium rubrostiolatum is a species of corticolous (bark-dwelling) lichen in the family Trypetheliaceae. Found in Brazil, it was formally described as a new species in 2017 by Marcela Eugenia da Silva Cáceres and André Aptroot. The type specimen was collected by the authors along a trail near a field station in the Adolfo Ducke Forest Reserve (Manaus); here it was found growing on tree bark in old-growth rainforest. The lichen has a dull yellowish thallus lacking a prothallus, with spherical to pear-shaped ascomata that are either immersed in or are below the thallus surface, typically arranged in groups of 7 to 25. The ascospores number eight per ascus, are muriform (divided in regular chambers), and measure 90–125 by 25–30 μm. The species epithet refers to the red colour in the ostioles. Thin-layer chromatography revealed the presence of an anthraquinone that was presumed to be parietin.
