= Astrothelium gyalostiolatum =

Scientific classification
- Kingdom: Fungi
- Division: Ascomycota
- Class: Dothideomycetes
- Order: Trypetheliales
- Family: Trypetheliaceae
- Genus: Astrothelium
- Species: A. gyalostiolatum

Binomial name
- Astrothelium gyalostiolatum Aptroot (2022)

Species of lichen-forming fungus

Astrothelium gyalostiolatum is a species of corticolous (bark-dwelling) crustose lichen in the family Trypetheliaceae. Found in Brazil, it was described in 2022 by the Dutch lichenologist André Aptroot. It belongs to the genus Astrothelium, sharing similarities with Astrothelium bicolor but uniquely characterized by the presence of lichexanthone exclusively around the ostioles.

== Description ==
The lichen has a dull, dirty ochraceous gray thallus, covering up to 15 cm in diameter. The thallus resembles resin in texture and is bordered by a black prothallus line. It produces ascomata, which are immersed in groups within pseudostromata, and bears hyaline, ascospores with three septa (internal partitions). The unique chemical signature is the UV+ (yellow) reaction of its ostioles, indicating the presence of lichexanthone.

== Habitat and distribution ==
Exclusive to Brazil's Mato Grosso region, A. gyalostiolatum grows on tree bark in primary rainforests.

== See also ==
- List of lichens of Brazil
