= Astrothelium nicaraguense =

Scientific classification
- Kingdom: Fungi
- Division: Ascomycota
- Class: Dothideomycetes
- Order: Trypetheliales
- Family: Trypetheliaceae
- Genus: Astrothelium
- Species: A. nicaraguense

Binomial name
- Astrothelium nicaraguense Lücking, M.P.Nelsen & T.Orozco (2016)
- Type locality: Reserva Natural Volcán Mombacho, near Granada, Nicauragua

Species of lichen-forming fungus

Astrothelium nicaraguense is a species of lichen-forming fungus in the family Trypetheliaceae. The lichen forms an olive-green crust on tree bark with an uneven to somewhat blistered surface texture. Its reproductive structures are either solitary or loosely grouped, appearing as raised bumps covered in greenish tissue with black dots at the top, and each spore sac produces a single large ascospore divided into many small compartments. The species occurs in montane rainforests of Central America and has also been recorded from the Amazon region of Brazil.

== Taxonomy ==
Astrothelium nicaraguense was described as a new species by Robert Lücking, Matthew Nelsen, and Tania Orozco. The type material was collected in Nicaragua (Granada Department) in the Reserva Natural Volcán Mombacho near Granada, where it was found in montane rainforest at about 1,000 m (3,300 ft) elevation on a fallen tree trunk along a trail toward the crater.

The specific epithet refers to the country where the type locality is situated. The species is most similar to A. gigantosporum in overall form, ascospore septation, and the absence of detected lichen substances, but it differs in having smaller ascospores. In A. nicaraguense, the spores occur singly in each ascus and lack a pronounced median constriction, whereas A. gigantosporum has larger, constricted ascospores that occur two per ascus. Although the two species are related, they have been reported to be phylogenetically distinct.

== Description ==
The thallus is crustose and grows on bark, forming a continuous patch up to about 3 cm (1.2 in) in diameter. It is olive-green and uneven to somewhat blistered in texture. In cross section, it has a thick, cartilage-like cortex, a distinct photobiont layer positioned near the surface, and a thick medulla.

The perithecia (flask-shaped fruiting bodies) are either solitary or loosely aggregated into diffuse pseudostromata. They are erumpent to prominent, up to about 1 mm tall and 0.9–1.2 mm across, and are usually covered by an olive-green layer of thallus tissue except at the ostiolar area. The ostioles are apical to slightly irregularly oriented and appear as black dots about 0.05–0.10 mm wide within a dark gray-brown area bordered by a whitish rim. Individual perithecia are pear-shaped, about 0.6–0.8 mm wide and 0.8–1.0 mm high. The excipulum is carbonized and about 70–100 μm thick. The hamathecium consists of a clear gelatinous matrix with a dense, net-like system of very thin, branching paraphyses; it is iodine staining-negative (IKI−), and the ostiolar channel is also clear.

Each ascus contains a single ascospore. The ascospores are hyaline, oblong-ellipsoid, densely muriform (divided into many small compartments by internal walls), and lack a median constriction, measuring about 160–200 × 40–60 μm; they are iodine-negative (IKI−). No secondary metabolites were detected.

== Habitat and distribution ==
The species is known from montane rainforest in the Reserva Natural Volcán Mombacho near Granada, Nicaragua. Collections were made in slightly disturbed forest along a trail leading toward the crater, where the lichen was found on woody substrates, including a fallen trunk and other tree trunks. In addition to the type collection at about 1,000 m (3,300 ft) elevation, further specimens have been reported from the same reserve at around 800 m (2,600 ft). It has also been recorded from Amazonas state in Brazil, and from Costa Rica.
