= Astrothelium amylosporum =

Scientific classification
- Kingdom: Fungi
- Division: Ascomycota
- Class: Dothideomycetes
- Order: Trypetheliales
- Family: Trypetheliaceae
- Genus: Astrothelium
- Species: A. amylosporum

Binomial name
- Astrothelium amylosporum Flakus & Aptroot (2016)

Species of lichen

Astrothelium amylosporum is a species of corticolous (bark-dwelling) lichen in the family Trypetheliaceae. Found in Bolivia, it was formally described as a new species in 2016 by lichenologists Adam Flakus and André Aptroot. The type specimen was collected near Florida village in Noel Kempff Mercado National Park (Santa Cruz Department); there, at an altitude of 220 m (720 ft), it was found growing on bark in a Beni savanna with trees. It is somewhat similar to Astrothelium subdisjunctum but differs from that species in its eight-spored asci and amyloid ascospores. The species epithet amylosporum refers to this latter characteristic.
