= Astrothelium philippinense =

Scientific classification
- Kingdom: Fungi
- Division: Ascomycota
- Class: Dothideomycetes
- Order: Trypetheliales
- Family: Trypetheliaceae
- Genus: Astrothelium
- Species: A. philippinense

Binomial name
- Astrothelium philippinense Aptroot & Schumm (2016)

Species of lichen

Astrothelium philippinense is a species of corticolous (bark-dwelling), crustose lichen in the family Trypetheliaceae. Found in the Philippines, it was formally described as a new species in 2016 by lichenologists André Aptroot and Felix Schumm. The type specimen was collected from Mount Talinis (Negros Oriental province) at an altitude between 1,100 and 1,600 m (3,600 and 5,200 ft); there, it was found in a rainforest growing on smooth tree bark. The lichen has a smooth and shiny, pale ochraceous-green thallus with a cortex and a thin (0.1–0.4 mm wide) brown to black prothallus line. It covers areas of up to 7 cm (2.8 in) in diameter. The presence of the lichen induces galls in the host plant, leading to the formation of numerous wart-like structures about 1–2 mm wide. No lichen products were detected in collected samples of the lichen using thin-layer chromatography. The combination of characteristics of the lichen that distinguish it from others in Astrothelium are the bullate, gall-like thallus; and the ascomata that are immersed in large thallus verrucae that are covered by thallus. The ascospores of A. philippinense number four per ascus. They are hyaline, ellipsoid, and muriform (divided into many chambers by several transverse and longitudinal septa), with dimensions of 125–170 by 30–35 μm.
