= Astrothelium robustosporum =

Scientific classification
- Kingdom: Fungi
- Division: Ascomycota
- Class: Dothideomycetes
- Order: Trypetheliales
- Family: Trypetheliaceae
- Genus: Astrothelium
- Species: A. robustosporum

Binomial name
- Astrothelium robustosporum Aptroot & M.Cáceres (2016)

Species of lichen

Astrothelium robustosporum is a species of corticolous (bark-dwelling) lichen in the family Trypetheliaceae. Found in Brazil, it was formally described as a new species in 2016 by André Aptroot and Marcela Cáceres. The type specimen was collected by the authors in the Estação Ecológica de Cuniã (Porto Velho, Rondônia), in a low-altitude primary rainforest. The lichen has a smooth and somewhat shiny, pale yellowish-grey thallus that lacks a prothallus and covers areas of up to 10 cm (4 in) in diameter. The ascomata are pear-shaped (pyriform) and typically occur singly, immersed in the bark tissue, and have a one-sided (eccentric) black ostiole. The lichen does not react with any of the standard chemical spot tests, and thin-layer chromatography did not reveal the presence of any lichen products. The species epithet robustosporum refers to the ascospores, which have a single thickened transverse septa that divides the spore into two diamond-shaped cavities.
