= Astrothelium ecuadorense =

Scientific classification
- Kingdom: Fungi
- Division: Ascomycota
- Class: Dothideomycetes
- Order: Trypetheliales
- Family: Trypetheliaceae
- Genus: Astrothelium
- Species: A. ecuadorense

Binomial name
- Astrothelium ecuadorense Aptroot (2016)

Species of lichen

Astrothelium ecuadorense is a species of corticolous (bark-dwelling), crustose lichen in the family Trypetheliaceae. Found in Ecuador, it was formally described as a new species in 2016 by Dutch lichenologist André Aptroot. The type specimen was collected by Harrie Sipman in the Estacion Cientifico San Francisco in the South Ecuadorian Andes (Zamora-Chinchipe Province); there, it was found in a mountainous rainforest growing on smooth tree bark. The lichen has a smooth and shiny, pale yellowish-green thallus with a cortex but lacking a prothallus, covering areas of up to 10 cm (4 in) in diameter. No lichen products were detected in the collected specimens. The main characteristics of the lichen distinguishing it from others in Astrothelium are the lack of pseudocyphellae on the thallus, and the solitary, exposed, black ascomata. It is also one of the few Astrothelium species with only two spores in its asci.
