= Astrothelium dicoloratum =

Scientific classification
- Kingdom: Fungi
- Division: Ascomycota
- Class: Dothideomycetes
- Order: Trypetheliales
- Family: Trypetheliaceae
- Genus: Astrothelium
- Species: A. dicoloratum

Binomial name
- Astrothelium dicoloratum Aptroot (2016)

Species of lichen

Astrothelium dicoloratum is a species of corticolous (bark-dwelling), crustose lichen in the family Trypetheliaceae. Found in Venezuela, it was formally described as a new species in 2016 by André Aptroot. The type specimen was collected southwest of La Esmeralda (Alto Orinoco, Amazonas) at an altitude of 110 m (360 ft); here, in a rainforest, the lichen was found growing on the smooth bark of trees. The thallus is completely covered with bright orange pigment. There is a single ascospore in the asci. These spores are hyaline, ellipsoid in shape, with 9 to 11 septa and dimensions of 50–75 by 11–15 μm. Chemical analysis of the lichen using thin-layer chromatography revealed the presence of an unnamed anthraquinone.
