= Astrothelium cayennense =

Scientific classification
- Kingdom: Fungi
- Division: Ascomycota
- Class: Dothideomycetes
- Order: Trypetheliales
- Family: Trypetheliaceae
- Genus: Astrothelium
- Species: A. cayennense

Binomial name
- Astrothelium cayennense Aptroot & Sipman (2019)

Species of lichen

Astrothelium cayennense is a species of corticolous (bark-dwelling) lichen in the family Trypetheliaceae. Found in French Guiana, it was formally described as a new species in 2019 by lichenologists André Aptroot and Harrie Sipman. The type specimen was collected by Aptroot along a forest track called "Risque tout", west of Cayenne, at an altitude of 50 m (160 ft); here, in a tropical rainforest, it was found growing on tree bark. The lichen has a smooth, shiny, ochraceous-green thallus that covers areas up to 5 cm (2 in) in diameter. It has pyriform ascomata, measuring 0.8–1.3 mm in diameter, which are immersed in pseudostromata. The ascospores are hyaline, ellipsoid in shape, muriform (i.e., divided into chambers) and measure 295–330 by 35–40 μm. The specific epithet cayennense refers to the type locality.
