= Astrothelium diaphanocorticatum =

Scientific classification
- Kingdom: Fungi
- Division: Ascomycota
- Class: Dothideomycetes
- Order: Trypetheliales
- Family: Trypetheliaceae
- Genus: Astrothelium
- Species: A. diaphanocorticatum

Binomial name
- Astrothelium diaphanocorticatum Aptroot & Sipman (2019)

Species of lichen

Astrothelium diaphanocorticatum is a species of corticolous (bark-dwelling) lichen in the family Trypetheliaceae. Found in Papua New Guinea, it was formally described as a new species in 2019 by lichenologists André Aptroot and Harrie Sipman. The type specimen was collected by Sipman on Mount Wilhelm (Chimbu Province) at an altitude of 2,900 m (9,500 ft). The lichen has an olive-green to yellowish-green thallus that is strongly convex and swollen (bullate) and partially comprises small (about 1 mm in diameter), roughly spherical globules. The thallus has a thick, clear cortex in which the algal cells can be visualised as green dots. It has roughly spherical ascomata, measuring 0.7–1.3 mm in diameter, which appear singly on the thallus surface, or, in some instances, fused together laterally. The ascospores are hyaline, ellipsoid in shape with three transverse septa, and measure 25–28 by 10–12 μm. The specific epithet diaphanocorticatum alludes to the transparent cortex.
