= Astrothelium carrascoense =

Scientific classification
- Kingdom: Fungi
- Division: Ascomycota
- Class: Dothideomycetes
- Order: Trypetheliales
- Family: Trypetheliaceae
- Genus: Astrothelium
- Species: A. carrascoense

Binomial name
- Astrothelium carrascoense Flakus, Kukwa & Aptroot (2016)

Species of lichen

Astrothelium carrascoense is a species of corticolous (bark-dwelling) lichen in the family Trypetheliaceae. Found in Bolivia, it was formally described as a new species in 2016 by lichenologists Adam Flakus, Martin Kukwa, and André Aptroot. The type specimen was collected by the first author near Sehuencas in Carrasco National Park (Carrasco Province, Cochabamba Department) at an altitude of 2,250 m (7,380 ft); there it was found growing on bark along a river in a Yungas cloud forest. Its species epithet refers to the type locality, the only place it is known to occur. The lichen has large, singly occurring ascomata that are completely covered by the green thallus. Its ascospores are narrowly ellipsoid and slightly curved, measuring 150–210 by 40–50 μm. Astrothelium meristosporum is somewhat similar in appearance, but can be distinguished by its narrower (25–40 μm) ascospores than have a distinct septum in the middle, and the ostioles (pores) of its ascomata.
