= Astrothelium valsoides =

Scientific classification
- Kingdom: Fungi
- Division: Ascomycota
- Class: Dothideomycetes
- Order: Trypetheliales
- Family: Trypetheliaceae
- Genus: Astrothelium
- Species: A. valsoides

Binomial name
- Astrothelium valsoides M.Cáceres & Aptroot (2017)

Species of lichen

Astrothelium valsoides is a species of lichen in the family Trypetheliaceae. Found in Brazil, it was formally described as a new species in 2017 by Marcela Eugenia da Silva Cáceres and André Aptroot. The type specimen was collected by the authors along a trail near a field station in the Adolfo Ducke Forest Reserve (Manaus); here it was found growing on tree bark in old-growth rainforest. The lichen has a dull olive-green thallus lacking a prothallus, with spherical to pear-shaped ascomata that are immersed in the thallus surface (up to 2 mm deep), and typically arranged in groups of 3 to 15. The ascospores number eight per ascus, are hyaline, usually have 13 to 15 septa, measure 69–80 by 15–17 μm, and have a gelatinous sheath. The species epithet refers to the groups of ascomata that are arranged in a way similar to those in genus Valsa.
