= Astrothelium alboverrucoides =

Scientific classification
- Kingdom: Fungi
- Division: Ascomycota
- Class: Dothideomycetes
- Order: Trypetheliales
- Family: Trypetheliaceae
- Genus: Astrothelium
- Species: A. alboverrucoides

Binomial name
- Astrothelium alboverrucoides Aptroot (2016)

Species of lichen

Astrothelium alboverrucoides is a species of corticolous (bark-dwelling) lichen in the family Trypetheliaceae. Found in Indonesia, it was formally described as a new species in 2016 by Dutch lichenologist André Aptroot. The type specimen was collected near Kutacane (Sumatra) at an altitude of 800 m (2,600 ft); here, it was found in a rainforest growing on smooth bark. The lichen has a smooth and somewhat shiny, greyish green thallus with a cortex, which covers areas of up to 4 cm (1.6 in) in diameter. No lichen products were detected in the collected specimens.
