= Astrothelium colombiense =

Scientific classification
- Kingdom: Fungi
- Division: Ascomycota
- Class: Dothideomycetes
- Order: Trypetheliales
- Family: Trypetheliaceae
- Genus: Astrothelium
- Species: A. colombiense

Binomial name
- Astrothelium colombiense Aptroot (2016)

Species of lichen

Astrothelium colombiense is a species of corticolous (bark-dwelling), crustose lichen in the family Trypetheliaceae. Found in Colombia, it was formally described as a new species in 2016 by Dutch lichenologist André Aptroot. The type specimen was collected from the Estacion Forestal La Espriella (Tumaco, Nariño) at an altitude of 35 m (115 ft). The lichen has shiny, pale ochraceous green thallus with a smooth to somewhat roughened texture. It has a cortex but lacks a prothallus. There is only a single ascospore in each ascus; this is a rarity in genus Astrothelium. The spores are hyaline, ellipsoid in shape, and muriform (i.e., divided into chambers by multiple transverse and longitudinal septa); they measure 240–300 by 45–50 μm. No lichen products were detected in this species. The specific epithet refers to the country of the type locality.
