= Astrothelium nigrum =

Scientific classification
- Kingdom: Fungi
- Division: Ascomycota
- Class: Dothideomycetes
- Order: Trypetheliales
- Family: Trypetheliaceae
- Genus: Astrothelium
- Species: A. nigrum

Binomial name
- Astrothelium nigrum Aptroot & M.Cáceres (2016)

Species of lichen-forming fungus

Astrothelium nigrum is a species of corticolous (bark-dwelling) lichen in the family Trypetheliaceae. It is characterized by its conical black pseudostromata, which contrast sharply with the thallus. This lichen species has been found only in Brazil and is unique in its appearance, superficially resembling a Pyrenula species.

== Taxonomy ==
Astrothelium nigrum was formally described as a new species in 2016 by lichenologists André Aptroot and Marcela Cáceres. The type specimen was collected in Rondônia, at the Estação Ecológica de Cuniã, on tree bark in primary rainforest. The species is known for its distinctive conical black pseudostromata that contrast sharply with the thallus, giving it a superficial resemblance to Pyrenula infraleucotrypa.

== Description ==
The thallus of Astrothelium nigrum is corticate, smooth, somewhat shiny, and continuous, with an ochraceous green color. It covers areas up to 10 cm (4 in) in diameter and is approximately 0.1 mm thick. The thallus is surrounded by a black prothallus line about 0.4 mm wide, and it induces gall formation on the host bark. The ascomata are pyriform, 0.2–0.4 mm wide and 0.5–0.7 mm high, mostly aggregated and immersed in conical to hemispherical pseudostromata with a black, non-corticated surface. The pseudostromata are distinctly raised above the thallus, regular in outline, with sloping sides, and up to 2 mm in diameter and 0.7 mm high. The wall of the ascomata is carbonized all around, up to 100 μm thick. The ostioles are eccentric, fused, flat to convex, black, and surrounded by a dull grey pruinose rim. The hamathecium is not inspersed with oil globules. The asci contain 8 ascospores, which are hyaline, fusiform, have 3 septa, and measure 19–21 by 7–8 μm in size, with rounded ends and diamond-shaped lumina.

== Habitat and distribution ==
Astrothelium nigrum is found on smooth bark of trees in primary forests and is currently known only from Brazil.

== See also ==
- List of lichens of Brazil
