= Astrothelium intermedium =

Scientific classification
- Kingdom: Fungi
- Division: Ascomycota
- Class: Dothideomycetes
- Order: Trypetheliales
- Family: Trypetheliaceae
- Genus: Astrothelium
- Species: A. intermedium

Binomial name
- Astrothelium intermedium Aptroot & Lucking (2008)

Species of lichen-forming fungus

Astrothelium intermedium is a species of corticolous (bark-dwelling), crustose lichen in the family Trypetheliaceae. It was formally described in 2008 from material collected on tree bark at Las Cruces Biological Station in Costa Rica, at about 1,200 m (3,900 ft) elevation. The lichen forms a smooth, glossy, olive-green crust that can spread over patches up to about 10 cm (4 in) across, with the fruiting bodies concentrated in low, wart-like lines across the surface. Under the microscope it produces colorless ascospores divided into several compartments.

== Taxonomy ==
It was described as a new species in 2008 by the lichenologists André Aptroot and Robert Lücking, based on material collected on bark at Las Cruces Biological Station in Puntarenas, Costa Rica, at about 1,200 m (3,900 ft) elevation. In the original description it was characterized as very similar to Trypethelium marcidum, but differing in its astrothelioid ascomata (the lichen's fruiting structures).

== Description ==
The lichen forms an olive-green, smooth, glossy thallus (the main lichen body) that may cover areas up to about 10 cm (4 in) across and lacks a hypothallus (a dark marginal zone). Its perithecia (flask-shaped fruiting bodies) are pear-shaped and measure about 0.2–0.4 × 0.3–0.5 mm; they are oriented vertically to often somewhat off-centre, and usually occur in groups of 2–5 that share common ostioles (openings). The perithecia are immersed in low, wart-like pseudostromata (up to 1 mm high) that cover about half of the thallus in irregular, net-like (anastomosing) lines roughly 3 mm wide and 1–2 cm long. These pseudostromata are covered by the green thallus except at the rounded, ochraceous, slightly raised ostiolar discs, where one or two tiny black ostioles are visible; each disc is bordered by a narrow ochraceous ring about 0.1 mm wide. Internally, the pseudostromata are pale and consist of fungal hyphae mixed with some bark cells, without pigments or crystals.

Microscopically, the perithecial wall is about 10–30 μm thick and is only partly carbonized, especially below the hymenium. The tissue between the asci (the hamathecium) is not oil-filled (not inspersed), and it does not react with iodine (IKI–); its filaments are extensively interconnected. Each ascus (spore sac) contains eight colorless ascospores that do not react with iodine (IKI–) and are split into compartments by one main cross-wall (euseptum) and three additional internal partitions (distosepta), measuring about 29–33 × 12–15 μm. The spore compartments (lumina) become diamond-shaped, but are more often simply angular, with the end compartments smaller than the central ones.

== Habitat and distribution ==
Astrothelium intermedium is a bark-dwelling lichen that occurs in Costa Rica. In notes accompanying the description, the authors suggested that Astrothelium intermedium might represent the Astrothelium morph of Trypethelium marcidum (= T. floridanum), since the two share a similar thallus and similar spores, but differ in the internal organization of the perithecia. They also remarked that its separation from T. marcidum parallels the way Astrothelium variolosum differs from Trypethelium ochroleucum.
