= Astrothelium minicecidiogenum =

Scientific classification
- Kingdom: Fungi
- Division: Ascomycota
- Class: Dothideomycetes
- Order: Trypetheliales
- Family: Trypetheliaceae
- Genus: Astrothelium
- Species: A. minicecidiogenum

Binomial name
- Astrothelium minicecidiogenum Aptroot & Sipman (2019)

Species of lichen

Astrothelium minicecidiogenum is a species of corticolous (bark-dwelling) lichen in the family Trypetheliaceae. Found in Costa Rica, it was formally described as a new species in 2019 by lichenologists André Aptroot and Harrie Sipman. The type specimen was collected by Aptroot from Tenorio Volcano National Park (Alajuela) at an altitude of 700 m (2,300 ft). The lichen has a smooth and shiny, olive-green thallus with a cortex, but lacking a prothallus. It covers areas up to about 7 cm (3 in) in diameter. It has pear-shaped (pyriform) ascomata, measuring 0.7–1.3 mm in diameter, which occur singly, immersed in the bark and under the thallus cortex. They are surrounded by carbonized (blackened) walls up to 80 μm thick. The ascospores are hyaline to yellowish, and muriform (divided into multiple chambers), with dimensions of 70–90 by 20–25 μm. They number eight per ascus. The specific epithet minicecidiogenum refers to both its relatively small spores and its resemblance to Astrothelium cecidiogenum.
