= Astrothelium fijiense =

Scientific classification
- Kingdom: Fungi
- Division: Ascomycota
- Class: Dothideomycetes
- Order: Trypetheliales
- Family: Trypetheliaceae
- Genus: Astrothelium
- Species: A. fijiense

Binomial name
- Astrothelium fijiense Lücking, Naksuwankul & Lumbsch (2016)

Species of lichen

Astrothelium fijiense is a species of corticolous (bark-dwelling), crustose lichen in the family Trypetheliaceae. Found in Fiji, it was formally described as a new species in 2016 by Robert Lücking, Khwanruan Naksuwankul, and Helge Thorsten Lumbsch. The type specimen was collected from Nakoba Levu (in the Suva area, Viti Levu island) at an altitude of 750 m (2,460 ft); there, it was found growing on bark on a steep slope in a secondary forest. The lichen has a smooth to uneven, light olive-yellow thallus that covers areas of up to 5 cm (2 in) in diameter. Both the thallus and the pseudostromata contain lichexanthone, a lichen product that causes these structures to fluoresce a yellow colour when lit with a long-wavelength UV light. The species epithet fijiense refers to the type locality. The characteristics of the lichen that distinguish it from others in genus Astrothelium are the distinctly pseudostromatic ascomata, and the presence of lichexanthone on the pseudostromata. Astrothelium cinereorosellum is somewhat similar, but that species has slightly longer ascospores and does not have lichexanthone on the pseudostromata.
