= Astrothelium flavomegaspermum =

Scientific classification
- Domain: Eukaryota
- Kingdom: Fungi
- Division: Ascomycota
- Class: Dothideomycetes
- Order: Trypetheliales
- Family: Trypetheliaceae
- Genus: Astrothelium
- Species: A. flavomegaspermum

Binomial name
- Astrothelium flavomegaspermum Aptroot & Etayo (2017)

Species of lichen

Astrothelium flavomegaspermum is a species of corticolous (bark-dwelling), crustose lichen in the family Graphidaceae. Found in Panama, it was formally described as a new species in 2017 by lichenologists André Aptroot and Javier Angel Etayo Salazar. The thallus of the lichen has a yellowish tinge and an irregular surface texture.

== Taxonomy ==
Astrothelium flavomegaspermum was described by lichenologists André Aptroot and Javier Etayo in 2017. The etymology of its name suggests that it is similar to, but distinct from, A. megaspermum, with the term flavo- indicating a yellowish inspersion in its hamathecium, a part of its reproductive structure. The type specimen was discovered in Bahía Honda, Playa del Edén, Panama, within a mangrove.

== Description ==
Astrothelium flavomegaspermum has an irregularly bulging or bullate thallus, which is the vegetative tissue of the lichen. The texture of the thallus is patchy, somewhat glossy, and appears to be olivaceous (an olive–green shade) without a prothallus surrounding it. The lichen is thickly corticate and the medulla, the innermost layer, is of an ochraceous (yellow to yellow-brown) hue. Its reproductive organs, known as ascomata, are solitary and vary in shape from spherical to pear-shaped. The ascomata, ranging from 1.4 to 2.6 mm in diameter, show ochraceous to grey colours and have beaked, topmost openings known as ostioles. Within the ascomata, ascospores (fungal spores) are present. They are hyaline, long-ellipsoid, regularly densely muriform (divided into multiple compartments by internal partitions or septa), and measure between 150 and 190 μm in length and 40–50 μm in width. Pycnidia, which are small asexual fruiting bodies, have not been observed in this species. The lichen yields an orange exudate in its chemical spot test reaction to a solution of potassium hydroxide.

== Habitat and distribution ==
Astrothelium flavomegaspermum grows on tree bark, specifically within the mangrove ecosystems of Panama. To date, this is the only known location where it has been found, suggesting a highly localised distribution.
