= Astrothelium dimidioinspersum =

Scientific classification
- Kingdom: Fungi
- Division: Ascomycota
- Class: Dothideomycetes
- Order: Trypetheliales
- Family: Trypetheliaceae
- Genus: Astrothelium
- Species: A. dimidioinspersum

Binomial name
- Astrothelium dimidioinspersum M.Cáceres & Aptroot (2017)

Species of lichen-forming fungus

Astrothelium dimidioinspersum is a species of corticolous (bark-dwelling) lichen in the family Trypetheliaceae. Found in Brazil, it was formally described as a new species in 2017 by Marcela Cáceres and André Aptroot. The type specimen was collected by the authors along a trail near a field station in the Adolfo Ducke Forest Reserve (Manaus); there it was found growing on tree bark in old-growth rainforest. It has a dull, pale greenish thallus lacking a prothallus, and spherical to pear-shaped ascomata immersed in and on the thallus. Ascospores number two per ascus, are muriform (divided into regular chambers), and measure 155–170 by 30–40 μm. The species epithet refers to the characteristic inspersion that occurs in the upper half of the hamathecium. The lichen lacks any secondary chemicals detectable with thin-layer chromatography.

== See also ==
- List of lichens of Brazil
