= Astrothelium palaeoexostemmatis =

Scientific classification
- Kingdom: Fungi
- Division: Ascomycota
- Class: Dothideomycetes
- Order: Trypetheliales
- Family: Trypetheliaceae
- Genus: Astrothelium
- Species: A. palaeoexostemmatis

Binomial name
- Astrothelium palaeoexostemmatis Aptroot & Sipman (2019)

Species of lichen

Astrothelium palaeoexostemmatis is a species of corticolous (bark-dwelling) lichen in the family Trypetheliaceae. Found in northern Thailand, it was formally described as a new species in 2019 by lichenologists André Aptroot and Harrie Sipman. The type specimen was collected near the Bhubing Palace (Doi Suthep, Chiang Mai) at an altitude of 1,550 m (5,090 ft); here, it was found in an oak/chestnut forest. The lichen has a smooth and shiny, ochraceous-brown thallus that covers areas up to 5 cm (2 in) in diameter. It has roughly spherical ascomata, measuring 0.4–0.6 mm in diameter; they are covered by the thallus with only a black ostiole (pore) visible. The ascospores are hyaline and muriform (i.e., divided into multiple chambers by vertical and transverse septa) and measure 85–100 by 20–24 μm. The specific epithet palaeoexostemmatis refers to both its Palaeotropical distribution and its resemblance to Astrothelium exostemmatis, a neotropical species.
