= Astrothelium condoricum =

Scientific classification
- Kingdom: Fungi
- Division: Ascomycota
- Class: Dothideomycetes
- Order: Trypetheliales
- Family: Trypetheliaceae
- Genus: Astrothelium
- Species: A. condoricum

Binomial name
- Astrothelium condoricum Aptroot (2016)

Species of lichen

Astrothelium condoricum is a species of corticolous (bark-dwelling), crustose lichen in the family Trypetheliaceae. Found in Ecuador, it was formally described as a new species in 2016 by André Aptroot. The type specimen was collected by the author from the Cordillera del Cóndor (Morona-Santiago Province) at an altitude of 1,200 m (3,900 ft); here it was found growing on the smooth bark of trees in a montane forest. The lichen thallus is completely covered by a bright orange pigment; it also has a bright scarlet internal pigment. Chemical analysis of the lichen using thin-layer chromatography revealed the presence of two unnamed anthraquinones. The species epithet condoricum refers to the type locality.
