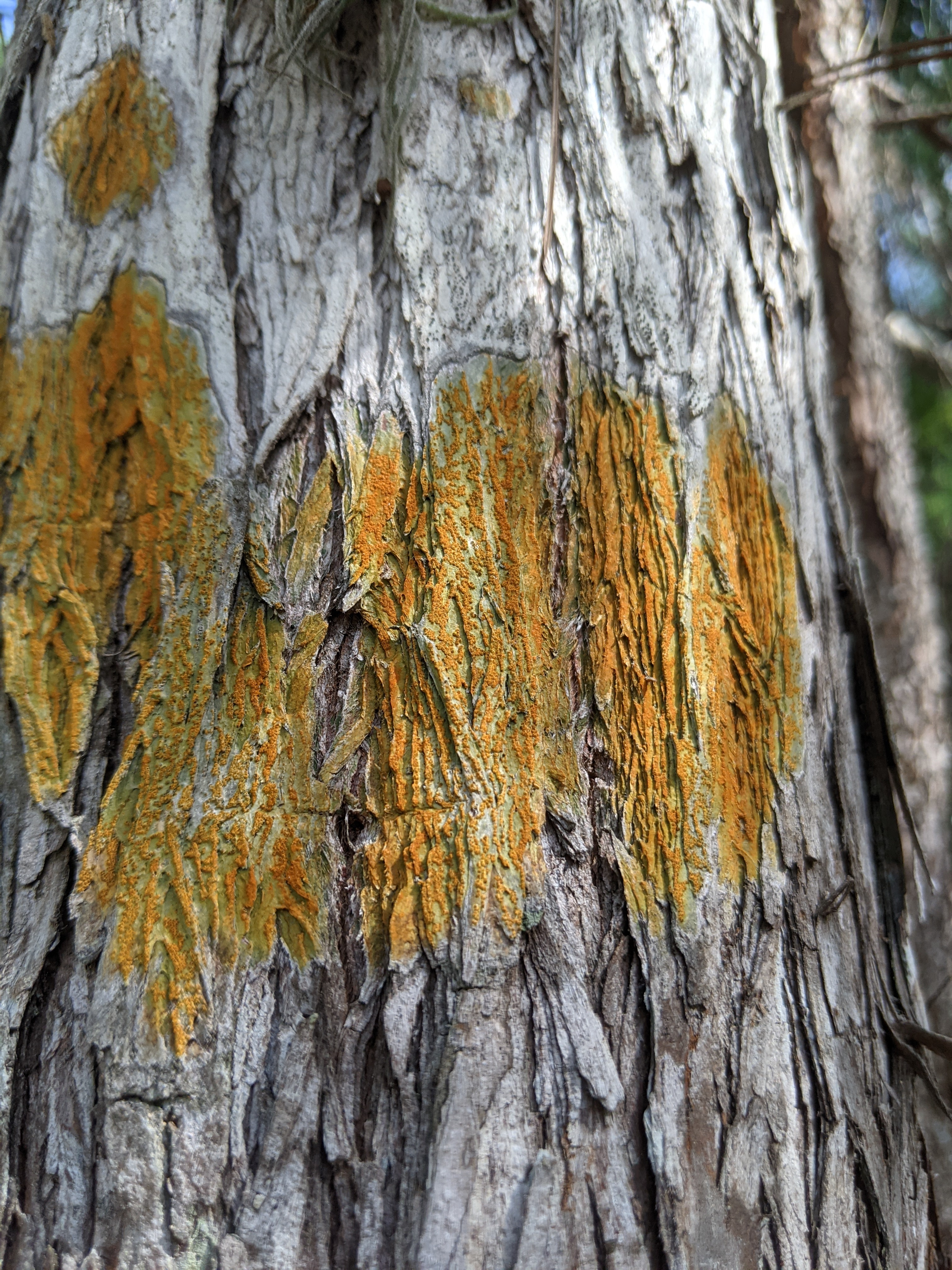
- Astrothelium aeneum found in Florida

Scientific classification
- Kingdom: Fungi
- Division: Ascomycota
- Class: Dothideomycetes
- Order: Trypetheliales
- Family: Trypetheliaceae
- Genus: Astrothelium; Eschw. (1824)

Type species
- Astrothelium conicum Eschw. (1824)

Synonyms
- Campylothelium Müll.Arg. (1883); Heufleria Trevis. (1853); Pyrenodium Fée (1837)

= Astrothelium =

Genus of lichens

Astrothelium is a large genus of corticolous (bark-dwelling) lichens in the family Trypetheliaceae. The genus is characterized by a corticate thallus and diverse ascomata structures, which can be simple, aggregated, or forming pseudostromata. Astrothelium is also notable for the carbonized walls of its ascomata, the so-called textura intricata (i.e., tightly interwoven) arrangement of cells in these walls, and various forms of distoseptate, transparent spores.

== Taxonomy ==
The genus was circumscribed in 1824 by German botanist Franz Gerhard Eschweiler, with Astrothelium conicum assigned as the type species.

== Description ==
The thallus, or the vegetative body of Astrothelium, is corticate, meaning it is covered by a protective cortex. The ascomata, which are the fruiting bodies containing the reproductive spores, can appear in various forms such as simple, aggregated, or forming pseudostromata. These structures often differ in their composition and colour, and can be used as characters to distinguish between species. The ascomata can range from being immersed within the thallus to prominently displayed on the surface. The ostioles, or small openings that allow the release of spores, can be located at the apex or eccentrically on the ascomata and may appear as either simple or fused structures.

Astrothelium is also notable for its ascomatal wall, which is made up of hyphal cells and is typically carbonized. The wall features a textura intricata, a term used to describe a tightly interwoven arrangement of cells.

Within the hamathecium, the tissue that houses the asci (spore-producing structures), the cells are either clear or filled with oil droplets. The ascospores, which are the sexual spores responsible for reproduction, are distoseptate and hyaline in appearance. They can also exhibit a variety of forms, including transversely septate or muriform, reflecting their segmented or multi-cellular nature.

== Species ==
As of January 2024, Species Fungorum accepts 267 species in Astrothelium.

- Astrothelium aenascens Aptroot (2016)
- Astrothelium aeneoides Aptroot (2016) – Brazil
- Astrothelium aeneum (Eschw.) Aptroot & Lücking (2016)
- Astrothelium alboverrucoides Aptroot (2016)
- Astrothelium alboverrucum (Makhija & Patw.) Aptroot & Lücking (2016)
- Astrothelium amazonum (R.C.Harris) Aptroot & Lücking (2016)
- Astrothelium ambiguum (Malme) Aptroot & Lücking (2016)
- Astrothelium amylosporum Flakus & Aptroot (2016) – Bolivia
- Astrothelium andamanicum (Makhija & Patw.) Aptroot & Lücking (2016)
- Astrothelium annulare (Fée) Aptroot & Lücking (2016)
- Astrothelium astrolucidum Aptroot & M.Cáceres (2017) – Brazil
- Astrothelium aurantiacocinereum Lücking, Naksuwankul & Lumbsch (2016)
- Astrothelium aurantiacum (Makhija & Patw.) Aptroot & Lücking (2016)
- Astrothelium aurantioseptemseptatum Aptroot (2023) – Brazil
- Astrothelium auratum (R.C.Harris) Aptroot & Lücking (2016)
- Astrothelium aureoirregulare Aptroot & Gumboski (2021)
- Astrothelium aureomaculatum (Vain.) Aptroot & Lücking (2016)
- Astrothelium basilicum (Kremp.) Aptroot & Lücking (2016)
- Astrothelium bicolor (Taylor) Aptroot & Lücking (2016)
- Astrothelium bireagens Lücking, N.Marín & Álvaro (2023) – Colombia
- Astrothelium bivelum Aptroot & M.Cáceres (2016) – Brazil
- Astrothelium buckii (R.C.Harris) Aptroot & Lücking (2016)
- Astrothelium bulbosum Aptroot (2023) – Brazil
- Astrothelium bullatothallinum Aptroot & Sipman (2019) – Venezuela
- Astrothelium bullatum Flakus & Aptroot (2016) – Bolivia
- Astrothelium calosporum (Müll.Arg.) Aptroot & Lücking (2016)
- Astrothelium campylocartilagineum Aptroot & Lücking (2016)
- Astrothelium carassense Lücking, M.P.Nelsen & Marcelli (2016)
- Astrothelium carrascoense Flakus, Kukwa & Aptroot (2016) – Bolivia
- Astrothelium cartilagineum (Fée) Aptroot & Lücking (2016)
- Astrothelium cayennense Aptroot & Sipman (2019) – French Guiana
- Astrothelium cecidiogenum (Aptroot & Lücking) Aptroot & Lücking (2016)
- Astrothelium ceratinum (Fée) Aptroot & Lücking (2016)
- Astrothelium chapadense (Malme) Aptroot & Lücking (2016)
- Astrothelium chrysoglyphum (Vain.) Aptroot & Lücking (2016)
- Astrothelium chrysostomum (Kremp.) Aptroot & Lücking (2016)
- Astrothelium chulumanense Flakus, Kukwa & Aptroot (2023) – Bolivia
- Astrothelium cinereorosellum (Kremp.) Aptroot & Lücking (2016)
- Astrothelium cinereum (Müll.Arg.) Aptroot & Lücking (2016)
- Astrothelium citrisporum Aptroot, Oliveira-Junior & M.Cáceres – Brazil
- Astrothelium clypeatum Aptroot & Gueidan (2016)
- Astrothelium coccineum Córd.-Cháv., Aptroot & M.Cáceres (2014) – Mexico
- Astrothelium colombiense Aptroot (2016)
- Astrothelium coloratum Aptroot (2023) – Brazil
- Astrothelium condoricum Aptroot (2016)
- Astrothelium confluens (Müll.Arg.) Aptroot & Lücking (2016)
- Astrothelium conicum Eschw. (1824)
- Astrothelium conjugatum Weerakoon & Aptroot (2016)
- Astrothelium consimile (Müll.Arg.) Aptroot & Lücking (2016)
- Astrothelium corallinum Aptroot (2016)
- Astrothelium corticatum (Makhija & Patw.) Kr.P.Singh & G.P.Sinha (2010)
- Astrothelium crassum (Fée) Aptroot (2008)
- Astrothelium cryptolucens Lücking, M.P.Nelsen & N.Salazar (2016)
- Astrothelium curvatum Aptroot & M.Cáceres (2016) – Brazil
- Astrothelium curvisporum Aptroot & M.Cáceres (2016) – Brazil
- Astrothelium decemseptatum Aptroot & M.Cáceres (2016) – Brazil
- Astrothelium deforme (Fée) Aptroot & Lücking (2016)
- Astrothelium defossum (Müll.Arg.) Aptroot & Lücking (2016)
- Astrothelium degenerans (Vain.) Aptroot & Lücking (2016)
- Astrothelium diaphanocorticatum Aptroot & Sipman (2019) – Papua New Guinea
- Astrothelium dicoloratum Aptroot (2016)
- Astrothelium dimidioinspersum M.Cáceres & Aptroot (2017) – Brazil
- Astrothelium disjunctum Aptroot & M.Cáceres (2016) – Brazil
- Astrothelium dissimilum (Makhija & Patw.) Aptroot & Lücking (2016)
- Astrothelium duplicatum Aptroot & M.Cáceres (2016) – Brazil
- Astrothelium ecuadorense Aptroot (2016)
- Astrothelium effusum (Aptroot & Sipman) Aptroot & Lücking (2016)
- Astrothelium elixii Flakus & Aptroot (2016) – Bolivia
- Astrothelium endochryseum (Vain.) Aptroot & Lücking (2016)
- Astrothelium eumultiseptatum Aptroot & M.Cáceres (2016) – Brazil
- Astrothelium eustominspersum Aptroot & Oliveira-Junior (2021) – Brazil
- Astrothelium eustomurale Aptroot & M.Cáceres (2016) – Brazil
- Astrothelium exostemmatis (Müll.Arg.) Aptroot & Lücking (2016)
- Astrothelium fallax Müll.Arg. (1885)
- Astrothelium feei (C.F.W. Meissn.) Aptroot & Lücking (2016)
- Astrothelium fernandae Aptroot (2020)
- Astrothelium ferrugineum (Müll.Arg.) Aptroot & Lücking (2016)
- Astrothelium fijiense Lücking, Naksuwankul & Lumbsch (2016)
- Astrothelium flavocoronatum Luangsuph., Aptroot & Sangvichien (2016)
- Astrothelium flavoduplex Aptroot & M.Cáceres (2016) – Brazil
- Astrothelium flavogigasporum Aptroot (2021) – Brazil
- Astrothelium flavomaculatum Aptroot (2016)
- Astrothelium flavomegaspermum Aptroot & Etayo (2017)
- Astrothelium flavomeristosporum Aptroot (2016)
- Astrothelium flavomurisporum Aptroot & M.Cáceres (2016) – Brazil
- Astrothelium flavostiolatum Aptroot (2016)
- Astrothelium flavostromatum Aptroot & M.Cáceres (2016) – Brazil
- Astrothelium flavum Aptroot & M.Cáceres (2016) – Brazil
- Astrothelium fuscosporum Soto-Medina, Aptroot & Lücking (2017)
- Astrothelium galbineum Kremp. (1875)
- Astrothelium galligenum (Aptroot) Aptroot & Lücking (2016)
- Astrothelium gigantosporum (Müll.Arg.) Aptroot & Lücking (2016)
- Astrothelium globosum Aptroot & M.Cáceres (2016) – Brazil
- Astrothelium graphicum Aptroot & S.M.Martins (2016) – Brazil
- Astrothelium grossoides Aptroot & Lücking (2016)
- Astrothelium guianense Aptroot (2016)
- Astrothelium gyalostiolatum Aptroot (2022) – Brazil
- Astrothelium himalayense (Upreti & Aptroot) Aptroot & Schumm (2021)
- Astrothelium indicum (Upreti & Ajay Singh) Aptroot & Lücking (2016)
- Astrothelium infossum (Nyl.) Aptroot & Lücking (2016)
- Astrothelium infravulcanum Aptroot (2022) – Brazil
- Astrothelium infuscatulum (Müll.Arg.) Aptroot & Lücking (2016)
- Astrothelium inspersaeneum E.L.Lima, Aptroot & M.Cáceres (2013)
- Astrothelium inspersonitidulum Aptroot & B.M.C. Barbosa 2022(2022) – Brazil
- Astrothelium inspersoconicum Aptroot & Weerakoon (2018)
- Astrothelium inspersogalbineum Aptroot & Weerakoon (2016)
- Astrothelium inspersonovemseptatum Aptroot (2023) – Brazil
- Astrothelium inspersotuberculosum Flakus & Aptroot (2016) – Bolivia
- Astrothelium insulare Aptroot (2023) – Brazil
- Astrothelium intermedium Aptroot & Lücking (2008)
- Astrothelium introflavidum Aptroot & M.Cáceres (2017) – Brazil
- Astrothelium irregulare (Müll.Arg.) Aptroot & Lücking (2016)
- Astrothelium isidiatum Kukwa, Flakus & Rodr.Flakus (2023) – Bolivia
- Astrothelium isohypocrellinum Aptroot & Weerakoon (2018)
- Astrothelium jiangxiense S.H.Jiang & C.Zhang (2022)
- Astrothelium keralense (Upreti & Ajay Singh) Aptroot & Lücking (2016)
- Astrothelium komposchii Aptroot (2016)
- Astrothelium kunzei (Fée) Aptroot & Lücking (2016)
- Astrothelium laevithallinum Lücking, M.P.Nelsen & Marcelli (2016)
- Astrothelium laurerosphaerioides Aptroot (2016)
- Astrothelium lauroides Aptroot (2023) – Brazil
- Astrothelium leioplacum (Müll.Arg.) Aptroot & Lücking (2016)
- Astrothelium leucosessile Lücking, M.P.Nelsen & Aptroot (2016)
- Astrothelium lineatum Aptroot & M.Cáceres (2016)
- Astrothelium longisporum Aptroot, J.R.Silva & M.Cáceres (2016) – Brazil
- Astrothelium lucidomedullatum Aptroot (2016)
- Astrothelium lucidostromum Aptroot (2016)
- Astrothelium lucidothallinum Aptroot (2016)
- Astrothelium lugescens (Nyl.) Aptroot & Lücking (2016)
- Astrothelium luminothallinum S.H.Jiang & C.Zhang (2022)
- Astrothelium luridum (Zahlbr.) Aptroot & Lücking (2016)
- Astrothelium macrocarpum (Fée) Aptroot & Lücking (2016)
- Astrothelium macroeustomum Aptroot & Sipman (2019) – French Guiana
- Astrothelium macrosporum (Makhija & Patw.) Aptroot & Lücking (2016)
- Astrothelium macrostiolatum Luangsuph., Aptroot & Sangvichien (2016)
- Astrothelium macrostomoides Lücking, M.P.Nelsen & Benatti (2016)
- Astrothelium macrostomum Aptroot (2016) – Brazil

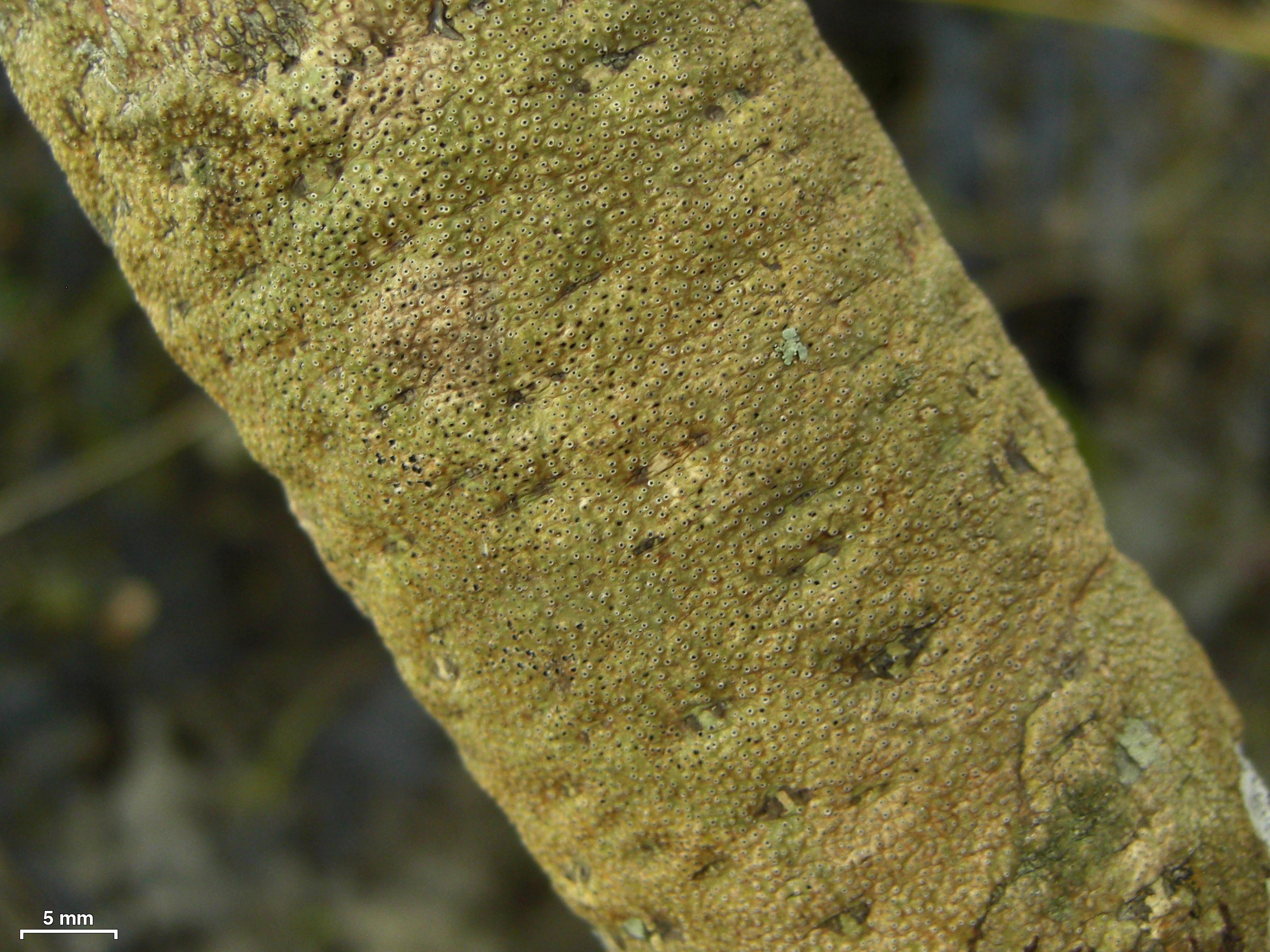
Astrothelium marcidum

- Astrothelium marcidum (Fée) Aptroot & Lücking (2016)
- Astrothelium marjoleinae Aptroot (2023) – Brazil
- Astrothelium meandratum Aptroot (2023) – Brazil
- Astrothelium mediocrassum Aptroot (2016)
- Astrothelium medioincrassatum Aptroot & M.Cáceres (2021) – Brazil
- Astrothelium megacrypticum Lücking, M.P.Nelsen & N.Salazar (2016)
- Astrothelium megaeneum Flakus & Aptroot (2016) – Bolivia
- Astrothelium megaleium (Kremp.) Aptroot & Lücking (2016)
- Astrothelium megalophthalmum (Müll.Arg.) Aptroot & Lücking (2016)
- Astrothelium megalostomum (Vain.) Aptroot & Lücking (2016)
- Astrothelium megaspermum (Mont.) Aptroot & Lücking (2016)
- Astrothelium megatropicum Aptroot (2016)
- Astrothelium megeustomum Aptroot & C.A.V. Fraga (2016) – Brazil
- Astrothelium megeustomurale M.Cáceres & Aptroot (2017) – Brazil
- Astrothelium meghalayense (Makhija & Patw.) Pushpi Singh & Kr.P. Singh (2015)
- Astrothelium megochroleucum Aptroot (2016)
- Astrothelium meiophorum (Nyl.) Aptroot & Lücking (2016)
- Astrothelium meristosporoides (P.M.McCarthy & Vongshew.) Aptroot & Lücking (2016)
- Astrothelium meristosporum (Mont. & Bosch) Aptroot & Lücking (2016)
- Astrothelium mesoduplex Aptroot & M.Cáceres (2016) – Brazil
- Astrothelium miniannulare Kalb & Aptroot (2018)
- Astrothelium minicecidiogenum Aptroot & Sipman (2019) – Costa Rica
- Astrothelium mordonialense Simijaca, Lücking & Moncada (2021)
- Astrothelium multireflexum Aptroot (2023) – Brazil
- Astrothelium muriconicum Aptroot & M.F.Souza (2021)
- Astrothelium myopicum Aptroot (2023) – Brazil
- Astrothelium neglectum Luangsuph., Aptroot & Sangvichien (2016)
- Astrothelium neodiplocarpum Flakus, Kukwa & Aptroot (2016) – Bolivia
- Astrothelium neogalbineum (R.C.Harris) Aptroot & Lücking (2016)
- Astrothelium neoinspersum Aptroot (2016)
- Astrothelium neovariolosum Luangsuph., Aptroot & Sangvichien (2016)
- Astrothelium nicaraguense Lücking, M.P.Nelsen & T.Orozco (2016)

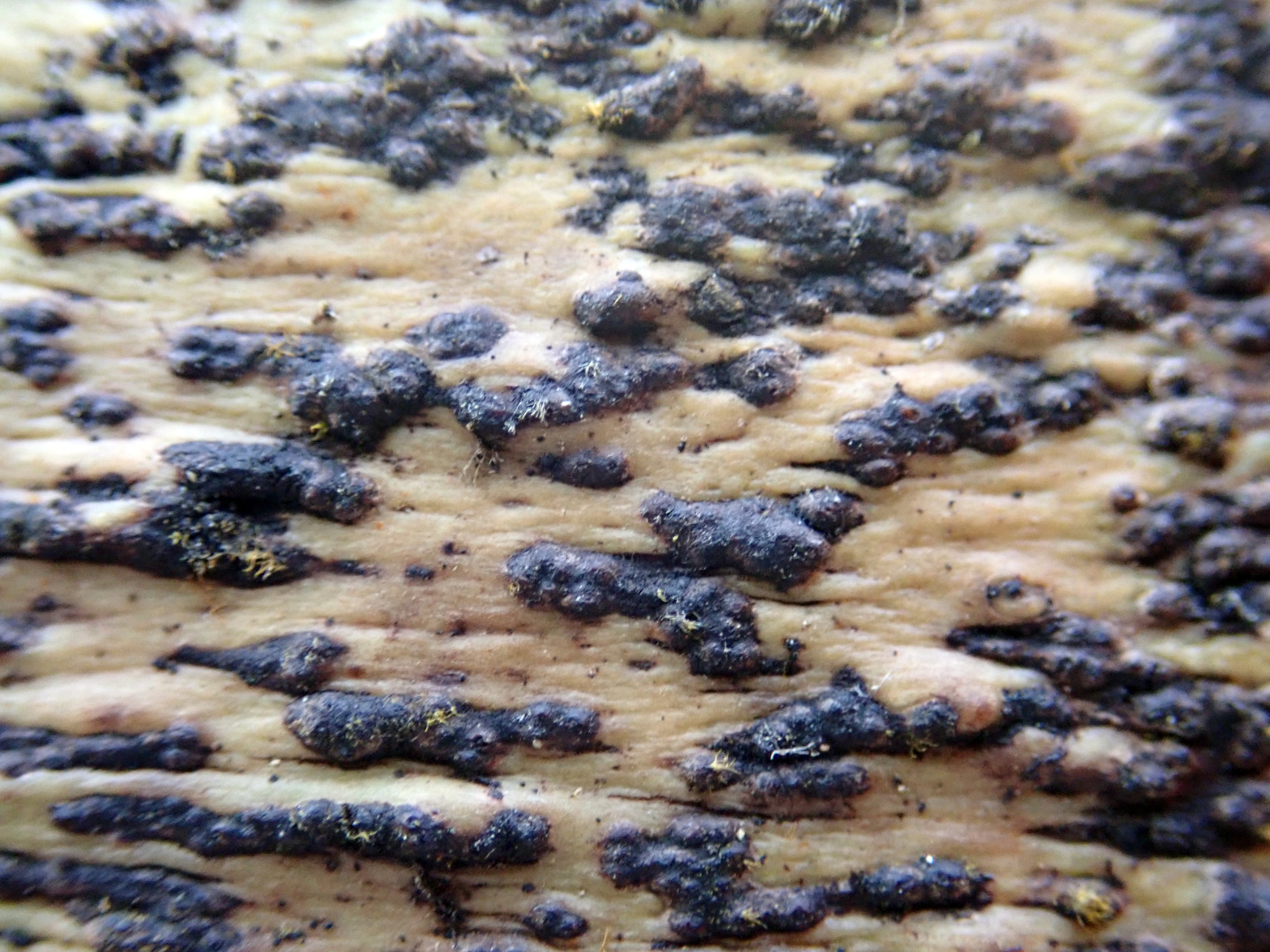
Astrothelium nigratum

- Astrothelium nigratum (Müll.Arg.) Aptroot & Lücking (2016)
- Astrothelium nigrocacuminum Flakus, Kukwa & Aptroot (2016) – Bolivia
- Astrothelium nigrorufum (Makhija & Patw.) Aptroot & Lücking (2016)
- Astrothelium nigrum Aptroot & M.Cáceres (2016) – Brazil
- Astrothelium nitidiusculum (Nyl.) Aptroot & Lücking (2016)
- Astrothelium nitidulum Weerakoon & Aptroot (2014)
- Astrothelium norisianum Lücking, M.P.Nelsen & Aptroot (2016)
- Astrothelium novemseptatum Aptroot & M.Cáceres (2016) – Brazil
- Astrothelium obtectum Lücking, M.P.Nelsen & Benatti (2016)
- Astrothelium ochraceum Aptroot (2020)
- Astrothelium ochroleucoides Aptroot & M.Cáceres (2016) – Brazil
- Astrothelium octoseptatum Aptroot & M.Cáceres (2016) – Brazil
- Astrothelium octosporoides Aptroot & Lücking (2016)
- Astrothelium octosporum (Vain.) Aptroot & Lücking (2016)
- Astrothelium oligocarpum (Müll.Arg.) Aptroot & Lücking (2016)
- Astrothelium olivaceofuscum (Zenker) Aptroot & Lücking (2016)
- Astrothelium palaeoexostemmatis Sipman & Aptroot (2019) – Thailand
- Astrothelium pallidoflavum Flakus & Aptroot (2016) – Bolivia
- Astrothelium papillosum (P.M. McCarthy) Aptroot & Lücking (2016)
- Astrothelium papulosum (Nyl.) Aptroot & Lücking (2016)
- Astrothelium parabathelium Aptroot (2023) – Brazil
- Astrothelium parathelioides Aptroot & B.M.C. Barbosa (2022) – Brazil
- Astrothelium peranceps (Kremp.) Aptroot & Lücking (2016)
- Astrothelium perspersum Aptroot & Ertz (2016)
- Astrothelium phaeothelium (Nyl.) Aptroot & Lücking (2016)
- Astrothelium philippinense Aptroot & Schumm (2016)
- Astrothelium phlyctaena (Fée) Aptroot & Lücking (2016)
- Astrothelium pictum Aptroot (2016) – Brazil
- Astrothelium porosum (Ach.) Aptroot & Lücking (2016)
- Astrothelium praetervisum (Müll.Arg.) Aptroot & Lücking (2016)
- Astrothelium pseudannulare Aptroot & Etayo (2016)
- Astrothelium pseudocrassum S.H.Jiang & C.Zhang (2022)
- Astrothelium pseudodermatodes Aptroot (2020)
- Astrothelium pseudodissimulum Aptroot (2016)
- Astrothelium pseudoferrugineum Aptroot (2016)
- Astrothelium pseudomegalophthalmum Aptroot (2016)
- Astrothelium pseudoplatystomum (Makhija & Patw.) Aptroot & Lücking (2016)
- Astrothelium pseudovariatum (Upreti & Ajay Singh) Aptroot & Lücking (2016)
- Astrothelium puiggarii (Müll.Arg.) Aptroot & Lücking (2016)
- Astrothelium pulcherrimum (Fée) Aptroot & Lücking (2016)
- Astrothelium pupula (Ach.) Aptroot & Lücking (2016)
- Astrothelium purpurascens (Müll.Arg.) Aptroot & Lücking (2016)
- Astrothelium pustulatum (Vain.) Aptroot & Lücking (2016)
- Astrothelium pyrenuliforme Flakus & Aptroot (2016) – Bolivia
- Astrothelium quasimamillanum Aptroot & C.O.Mendonça (2019) – Brazil
- Astrothelium quatuorseptatum Aptroot & M.Cáceres (2016) – Brazil
- Astrothelium quintannulare Aptroot (2022) – Brazil
- Astrothelium quintosulphureum Aptroot & M. Cáceres (2022) – Brazil
- Astrothelium rhinothallinum Kalb & Aptroot (2018)
- Astrothelium rimosum Aptroot (2016)
- Astrothelium robustosporum Aptroot & M.Cáceres (2016) – Brazil
- Astrothelium rogitamae Simijaca, Lücking & Moncada (2021)
- Astrothelium rubrocrystallinum Aptroot & M.Cáceres (2016) – Brazil
- Astrothelium rubrostiolatum M.Cáceres & Aptroot (2017) – Brazil
- Astrothelium rufescens (Müll.Arg.) Aptroot & Lücking (2016)
- Astrothelium sanguinarium (Malme) Aptroot & Lücking (2016)
- Astrothelium sanguineoxanthum Aptroot (2016)
- Astrothelium santessonii (Letr.-Gal.) Aptroot & Lücking (2016)
- Astrothelium saxicola (Malme) Aptroot & Lücking (2016)
- Astrothelium scoria (Fée) Aptroot & Lücking (2016)
- Astrothelium scoriothelium Aptroot & Lücking (2016)
- Astrothelium scorizum (Müll.Arg.) Aptroot & Lücking (2016)
- Astrothelium septemseptatum Aptroot (2016)
- Astrothelium septoconicum Aptroot (2020)
- Astrothelium sexloculatum Aptroot (2016)
- Astrothelium siamense Luangsuph., Aptroot & Sangvichien (2016)
- Astrothelium sierraleonense (C.W.Dodge) Aptroot & Lücking (2016)
- Astrothelium sikkimense (Makhija & Patw.) Aptroot & Lücking (2016)
- Astrothelium simplex Aptroot & S.M.Martins (2016) – Brazil
- Astrothelium sinense S.H.Jiang & C.Zhang (2021)
- Astrothelium sinuosum Aptroot & Gumboski (2016) – Brazil
- Astrothelium sipmanii Aptroot (2016)
- Astrothelium solitarium Aptroot & M.Cáceres (2016) – Brazil
- Astrothelium sordithecium Lücking, M.P.Nelsen & Marcelli (2016)
- Astrothelium spectabile (Aptroot & L.I. Ferraro) Aptroot & Lücking (2016)
- Astrothelium sphaerioides (Mont.) Aptroot & Lücking (2016)
- Astrothelium squamosum Aptroot (2022) – Brazil
- Astrothelium stellare Aptroot (2023) – Brazil
- Astrothelium stramineum (Malme) Aptroot & Lücking (2016)
- Astrothelium straminicolor (Nyl.) Aptroot & Lücking (2016)
- Astrothelium stromatocinnamomeum Aptroot (2022) – Brazil
- Astrothelium stromatofluorescens Aptroot & M.Cáceres (2016) – Brazil
- Astrothelium stromatolucidum Lücking, N.Marín & Álvaro (2023) – Colombia
- Astrothelium studerae Aptroot & M.Cáceres (2019) – Brazil
- Astrothelium subcatervarium (Malme) Aptroot & Lücking (2016)
- Astrothelium subdiscretum (Nyl.) Aptroot & Lücking (2016)
- Astrothelium subdisjunctum (Müll.Arg.) Aptroot & Lücking (2016)
- Astrothelium subdissocians (Nyl. ex Vain.) Aptroot & Lücking (2016)
- Astrothelium subendochryseum Lücking, M.P.Nelsen & Marcelli (2016)
- Astrothelium subeustominspersum S.H.Jiang & C.Zhang (2022)
- Astrothelium subinterjectum Lücking, M.P.Nelsen & Jungbluth (2016)
- Astrothelium subnitidiusculum (Makhija & Patw.) Pushpi Singh & Kr.P.Singh (2015)
- Astrothelium subrufescens S.H.Jiang & C.Zhang (2022)
- Astrothelium subscoria Flakus & Aptroot (2016) – Bolivia
- Astrothelium subsiamense Y.F.Zhao & Z.F.Jia (2023)
- Astrothelium sulphureum (Eschw.) Nyl. (1863)
- Astrothelium superbum (Fr.) Aptroot & Lücking (2016)
- Astrothelium supraclandestinum Aptroot & M.Cáceres (2016) – Brazil
- Astrothelium suprainspersum Aptroot (2023) – Brazil
- Astrothelium tanianum Aptroot & Sipman (2019) – Malaysia
- Astrothelium tenue (Aptroot) Aptroot & Lücking (2016)
- Astrothelium testudineum Aptroot & M.Cáceres (2016) – Brazil
- Astrothelium tetrasporum Aptroot & M.Cáceres (2016) – Brazil
- Astrothelium thelotremoides (Nyl.) Aptroot & Lücking (2016)
- Astrothelium trematum Kalb & Aptroot (2018)
- Astrothelium trypethelioides Aptroot (2016)
- Astrothelium trypethelizans (Nyl.) Aptroot & Lücking (2016)
- Astrothelium tuberculosum (Vain.) Aptroot & Lücking (2016)
- Astrothelium ubianense (Vain.) Aptroot & Lücking (2016)
- Astrothelium ultralucens Aptroot (2016)
- Astrothelium unisporum Aptroot & M.Cáceres (2016)
- Astrothelium valsoides M.Cáceres & Aptroot (2017) – Brazil
- Astrothelium variabile Flakus & Aptroot (2016) – Bolivia
- Astrothelium variatum (Nyl.) Aptroot & Lücking (2016)
- Astrothelium vezdae (Makhija & Patw.) Aptroot & Lücking (2016)
- Astrothelium vulcanum Aptroot (2016)
- Astrothelium xanthocavatum Aptroot (2023) – Brazil
- Astrothelium xanthopseudocyphellatum Aptroot (2020)
- Astrothelium xanthosordithecium Aptroot (2022) – Brazil
- Astrothelium xanthosuperbum Aptroot & M.Cáceres (2016) – Brazil
- Astrothelium zebrinum Aptroot (2016)
