= Astrothelium perspersum =

Scientific classification
- Kingdom: Fungi
- Division: Ascomycota
- Class: Dothideomycetes
- Order: Trypetheliales
- Family: Trypetheliaceae
- Genus: Astrothelium
- Species: A. perspersum

Binomial name
- Astrothelium perspersum Aptroot & Ertz (2016)

Species of lichen

Astrothelium perspersum is a species of corticolous (bark-dwelling), crustose lichen in the family Trypetheliaceae. Found in Gabon, it was formally described as a new species in 2016 by lichenologists André Aptroot and Damien Ertz. It is one of the few Trypetheliaceae species known only from Africa. The type specimen was collected by the second author between the villages of Massaha and Batouala (northeast of Makokou); there, it was found in a rainforest growing on smooth tree bark. The lichen has a smooth and somewhat shiny, pale greenish-grey thallus with a cortex and a thin (0.1 mm wide) black prothallus line. It covers areas of up to 4 cm (1.6 in) in diameter. The presence of the lichen does not induce the formation of galls in the host plant. No lichen products were detected from collected specimens using thin-layer chromatography. The combination of characteristics of the lichen that distinguish it from others in Astrothelium are the dimensions of its ascospores (typically 30–40 μm long by 7–9 μm wide); and the arrangement and form of its ascomata—from irregular groups to pseudostromatic, with the pseudostromata erumpent, and white (contrasting with thallus colour). Astrothelium perspersum is somewhat similar to A. scoria, but has larger ascospores than that species.
