= Astrothelium laurerosphaerioides =

Scientific classification
- Kingdom: Fungi
- Division: Ascomycota
- Class: Dothideomycetes
- Order: Trypetheliales
- Family: Trypetheliaceae
- Genus: Astrothelium
- Species: A. laurerosphaerioides

Binomial name
- Astrothelium laurerosphaerioides Aptroot (2016)

Species of lichen

Astrothelium laurerosphaerioides is a species of corticolous (bark-dwelling), crustose lichen in the family Trypetheliaceae. Found in Guyana, it was formally described as a new species in 2016 by Dutch lichenologist André Aptroot. The type specimen was collected by Harrie Sipman on Kusad Mountain (Rupununi savannah, Upper Takutu-Upper Essequibo) at an altitude of 450 m (1,480 ft); there, it was found in a savanna growing on smooth tree bark.

The lichen has a smooth and shiny, pale ochraceous-green thallus with a cortex, which covers areas of up to 15 cm (6 in) in diameter. An anthraquinone compound was the only lichen product detected in the collected specimens using thin-layer chromatography. The characteristics of the lichen distinguishing it from others in Astrothelium are its immersed-erumpent ascomata that have an exposed blackish area around their ostioles; the presence of two ascospores per ascus, and the dimensions of the spores (110–130 by 30–35 μm).
