= Astrothelium flavomeristosporum =

Scientific classification
- Kingdom: Fungi
- Division: Ascomycota
- Class: Dothideomycetes
- Order: Trypetheliales
- Family: Trypetheliaceae
- Genus: Astrothelium
- Species: A. flavomeristosporum

Binomial name
- Astrothelium flavomeristosporum Aptroot (2016)

Species of lichen

Astrothelium flavomeristosporum is a species of corticolous (bark-dwelling), crustose lichen in the family Trypetheliaceae. Found in Ecuador and the Philippines, it was formally described as a new species in 2016 by Dutch lichenologist André Aptroot. The type specimen was collected by American botanist Edward Elmer from Irosin (Sorsogon, Luzon), in 1916. The lichen has a smooth and somewhat shiny, greyish-green thallus with a cortex surrounded by a thin (0.1 mm wide) black prothallus line. It covers areas of up to 9 cm (3.5 in) in diameter, and does not induce the formation of galls in the host tree. No lichen products were detected in the species using thin-layer chromatography. The main characteristics of the lichen distinguishing it from others in Astrothelium are its smooth to uneven thallus, its prominent, blackish, and exposed ascomata, and its yellow hamathecium.
