= Astrothelium inspersoconicum =

Scientific classification
- Kingdom: Fungi
- Division: Ascomycota
- Class: Dothideomycetes
- Order: Trypetheliales
- Family: Trypetheliaceae
- Genus: Astrothelium
- Species: A. inspersoconicum

Binomial name
- Astrothelium inspersoconicum Aptroot & Weerakoon (2018)
- Holotype: Runakanda – Maguru Ganga area of Sri Lanka

Species of lichen

Astrothelium inspersoconicum is a species of corticolous (bark-dwelling), crustose lichen in the family Trypetheliaceae. Found in Sri Lanka, it was described as a new species in 2018.

== Taxonomy ==
The species was officially described by the lichenologists André Aptroot and Gothamie Weerakoon in 2018. The type specimen was collected by the second author in the Runakanda – Maguru Ganga area of Sri Lanka, at an elevation of 249 m (817 ft). The epithet inspersoconicum reflects the unique combination of an inspersed hamathecium and its association with the conicum-aggregate group within the genus Astrothelium, which is a rare feature in this group.

== Description ==
Astrothelium inspersoconicum has a corticate, smooth, and somewhat shiny thallus covering areas up to 15 cm (6 in) in diameter, with a pale greenish-grey hue and a distinct brown, glossy prothallus line. Its ascomata (fruiting bodies) are pyriform and primarily aggregated, with a carbonised wall and eccentric, fused, and conical ostioles covered by an orange pruina. The hamathecium of the species is inspersed with oil globules, a distinguishing feature. It carries hyaline, fusiform (tapered) ascospores that have three septa (internal partitions) with diamond-shaped lumina, and measure 23–25 by 7–8 μm.

It is closely related to Astrothelium cinnamomeum but can be distinguished by its inspersed hamathecium. It represents a rare instance within the Astrothelium conicum-group, in which the hamathecium is typically not inspersed.

== Habitat and distribution ==
This species is found in Asia, specifically recorded in Sri Lanka.
