= Astrothelium conjugatum =

Scientific classification
- Kingdom: Fungi
- Division: Ascomycota
- Class: Dothideomycetes
- Order: Trypetheliales
- Family: Trypetheliaceae
- Genus: Astrothelium
- Species: A. conjugatum

Binomial name
- Astrothelium conjugatum Weerakoon & Aptroot (2016)

Species of lichen

Astrothelium conjugatum is a species of corticolous (bark-dwelling) crustose lichen in the family Trypetheliaceae, first described in 2016. It is known to occur in Sri Lanka.

== Taxonomy ==
The species was formally described in 2016 by lichenologists Gothamie Weerakoon and André Aptroot. The type specimen was collected in Rilhena, Sri Lanka.

== Description ==
Astrothelium conjugatum is characterized by its ascomata, which are pyriform and arranged with 2–8 chambers joined with eccentric, fused ostioles. Typically, 3–10 fused ascomata are grouped within one pseudostroma. The pseudostromata are about 1–5 mm in diameter, erumpent to prominent, with an irregularly lobate to linear outline. They are completely covered by a thallus layer that is thick and opaque at the sides. The top of the pseudostromata can be similar in appearance or thinner and translucent, in which case the black ascoma wall is visible through it. The thallus itself is corticate, pale yellowish brown, rather smooth, covering areas of up to 7 cm (2.8 in) in diameter, and lacks a prothallus. Ascomata are about 0.5–0.7 mm in diameter. The hamathecium is clearly but sparsely interspersed with hyaline oil droplets. The ascospores have an astrothelioid form. They are hyaline, 3-septate, fusiform to ellipsoid in shape, measuring 20–25 by 6.5–7.5 μm, and have diamond-shaped lumina when mature. Pycnidia were not observed to occur in the species.

The thallus and pseudostroma of Astrothelium conjugatum react UV− and K− in chemical spot tests, and thin-layer chromatography did not detect any lichen products.

This species is closely related to Astrothelium straminicolor, which is found in India, Malaysia, and Sarawak. The primary distinguishing feature of A. conjugatum is the presence of a thallus layer on top of the pseudostromata, a feature absent in A. straminicolor.

== Habitat and distribution ==
Astrothelium conjugatum is known only from its type locality in Sri Lanka, where it was found on tree bark in a wet lowland tropical rainforest.
