= Astrothelium subscoria =

Scientific classification
- Kingdom: Fungi
- Division: Ascomycota
- Class: Dothideomycetes
- Order: Trypetheliales
- Family: Trypetheliaceae
- Genus: Astrothelium
- Species: A. subscoria

Binomial name
- Astrothelium subscoria Flakus & Aptroot (2016)

Species of lichen

Astrothelium subscoria is a species of corticolous (bark-dwelling) lichen in the family Trypetheliaceae. Found in Bolivia, it was formally described as a new species in 2016 by lichenologists Adam Flakus and André Aptroot. The type specimen was collected from lowland Amazon forest in the Puerto Feliz colony by Río Blanco (Iténez Province, Beni Department) at an altitude of 137 m (449 ft). It is only known to occur at the type locality. The species epithet refers to its resemblance to Astrothelium scoria, from which it differs in having in having non-aggregated ascomata.
