= Astrothelium grossoides =

Scientific classification
- Kingdom: Fungi
- Division: Ascomycota
- Class: Dothideomycetes
- Order: Trypetheliales
- Family: Trypetheliaceae
- Genus: Astrothelium
- Species: A. grossoides

Binomial name
- Astrothelium grossoides Aptroot & Lücking (2016)

Synonyms
- Trypethelium grossum Müll.Arg. (1884)

Species of lichen-forming fungus

Astrothelium grossoides is a species of lichen in the family Trypetheliaceae. It forms olive-green to brownish patches with a distinctly bumpy, blistered surface on tree bark in tropical forests, particularly in well-lit canopy environments and open woodland habitats. The species is recognized by its closely packed fruiting bodies that are largely embedded and overgrown by the thallus, each opening through a pore at the apex, and by relatively small ascospores with three cross-walls. It was formally established in 2016 under a replacement scientific name to avoid duplication with an earlier-named species, based on type material originally collected from Papua New Guinea where it occurs locally in abundance.

== Taxonomy ==
In 2016, André Aptroot and Robert Lücking published Astrothelium grossoides as a replacement name (a nomen novum) for Trypethelium grossum Müll.Arg. (1884). The specific epithet grossum could not be used in Astrothelium because it would have duplicated the already-published name Astrothelium grossum Müll.Arg. (1888), creating a later homonym (the same name used for two different species). The type collection (Naumann 409) is from Papua New Guinea, with an isotype (a duplicate specimen) housed in the herbarium of the Natural History Museum, London.

== Description ==
The thallus (lichen body) has an outer cortex and is olive-green to brownish, with a distinctly uneven, bullate (blistered) surface with gall-like swellings (pseudogalls). The fruiting bodies (ascomata) are trypethelioid and open through ostioles at the top. They are often packed together, sometimes forming diffuse pseudostromata; each ascoma is about 0.4–0.5 mm in diameter and is embedded in, and overgrown by, the thallus. The hamathecium (tissue between the asci) is inspersed (filled with many tiny droplets). Ascospores are eight per ascus, hyaline, 3-septate, and measure 15–32 × 9–12 μm; they are IKI−. In spot tests, the thallus and ascomata are UV+ (yellow under ultraviolet light) and K− (no reaction with potassium hydroxide). Thin-layer chromatography detected lichexanthone.

== Habitat and distribution ==
Trypetheliaceae is an almost entirely tropical family. Most species are epiphytic (growing on plants, usually tree bark) and are often found in well-lit places such as the forest canopy. They also occur in more open tropical habitats, including savannas and dry forests. Astrothelium grossoides is reported from Papua New Guinea, where it is locally abundant, and from New Caledonia.
