= Astrothelium eustomurale =

Scientific classification
- Kingdom: Fungi
- Division: Ascomycota
- Class: Dothideomycetes
- Order: Trypetheliales
- Family: Trypetheliaceae
- Genus: Astrothelium
- Species: A. eustomurale

Binomial name
- Astrothelium eustomurale Aptroot & M.Cáceres (2016)

Species of lichen-forming fungus

Astrothelium eustomurale is a species of corticolous (bark-dwelling), crustose lichen in the family Trypetheliaceae. Found in Brazil, it was formally described as a new species in 2016 by lichenologists André Aptroot and Marcela Cáceres. The type specimen was collected by the authors in the Parque Natural Municipal de Porto Velho (Porto Velho, Rondônia), in a low-altitude primary rainforest. The lichen has a smooth and somewhat shiny, pale yellowish-grey thallus that lacks a prothallus and covers areas of up to 12 cm (4.7 in) in diameter. The presence of the lichen does not induce the formation of galls in the host. The ascomata are pear-shaped (pyriform) and typically occur in aggregates of two to five, usually immersed in the bark tissue under the pseudostromata and with a whitish-coloured tissue that contrasts with the surrounding thallus. Black pycnidia are abundant on the pseudostromata. The area around and including the ostiole of the ascomata contains lichexanthone, a lichen product that causes these areas to glow yellow when lit with a long-wavelength UV light. The characteristics that distinguish it from other members of Astrothelium include the UV+ yellow nature of the ostiole; and the fused, erumpent pseudostromatic ascomata that have a white cover contrasting it with the thallus colour.

== See also ==
- List of lichens of Brazil
