= Astrothelium sinuosum =

Scientific classification
- Domain: Eukaryota
- Kingdom: Fungi
- Division: Ascomycota
- Class: Dothideomycetes
- Order: Trypetheliales
- Family: Trypetheliaceae
- Genus: Astrothelium
- Species: A. sinuosum

Binomial name
- Astrothelium sinuosum Aptroot & Gumboski (2016)

Species of lichen

Astrothelium sinuosum is a species of corticolous (bark-dwelling), crustose lichen in the family Trypetheliaceae. Found in Brazil, it was formally described as a new species in 2016 by André Aptroot and Emerson Gumboski. The type specimen was collected by the second author from the Rio Pardinho e Rio Vermelho Environmental Protection Area (São Paulo); there, in an Atlantic Forest habitat, it was found growing on smooth tree bark.

The lichen has a somewhat shiny, bullate, olive-green thallus with a cortex but lacking a prothallus; it measures up to 7 cm (2.8 in) in diameter. The presence of the lichen does not induce the formation of galls in the host. The ascomata are pyriform (pear-shaped), measuring about 0.6–1.2 mm in diameter. They tend to aggregate in groups of two to five, and are largely immersed in the bark tissue. The area of the ostioles contains lichexanthone, a lichen product that causes these structures to fluoresce yellow when lit with a long-wavelength UV light. The characteristics of the lichen that distinguish it from other members of Astrothelium include its distinctly pseudostromatic ascomata with erumpent pseudostromata, with a white cover that contrasts with the surrounding olive-green thallus; and the dimensions of its ascospores (60–70 by 17–20 μm). Astrothelium simplex is somewhat similar in appearance, but that species does not contain lichexanthone, and it lacks a gelatinous sheath around the ascospores as in A. sinuosum. Another lookalike, A. globosum, has shorter ascospores.
