= Bogoriella queenslandica =

Scientific classification
- Kingdom: Fungi
- Division: Ascomycota
- Class: Dothideomycetes
- Order: Trypetheliales
- Family: Trypetheliaceae
- Genus: Bogoriella
- Species: B. queenslandica

Binomial name
- Bogoriella queenslandica (Müll.Arg.) Aptroot & Lücking (2016)

Synonyms
- Microthelia queenslandica Müll.Arg. (1895); Ornatopyrenis queenslandica (Müll.Arg.) Aptroot (1991); Mycomicrothelia queenslandica (Müll.Arg.) Sipman & Aptroot (2005)

Species of lichen

Bogoriella queenslandica is a species of corticolous (bark-dwelling) crustose lichen in the family Trypetheliaceae. This widespread tropical lichen forms whitish crusty patches marked by distinctive dark border lines and produces relatively large, solitary dark fruiting bodies. It has a pantropical distribution, being found across multiple continents including Central and South America, Southeast Asia, the Pacific region, and Australia.

== Taxonomy ==
Bogoriella queenslandica was originally described in 1895 by Johannes Müller Argoviensis as Microthelia queenslandica, based on material collected in Queensland, Australia. It was later transferred to Ornatopyrenis by André Aptroot in 1991, and subsequently to Mycomicrothelia by Harrie Sipman and Aptroot in 2005. In 2016, Aptroot and Robert Lücking placed the species in the genus Bogoriella, giving it its current name. The lectotype, designated by David Hawksworth in 1985, is housed in the Geneva herbarium (G).

== Description ==
Bogoriella queenslandica has a whitish thallus marked by dark prothallus lines. Its fruiting bodies (ascomata) are solitary, measuring 0.8–1.1 mm in diameter and about 0.2–0.3 mm tall, each with an apical opening. The asci are 110–130 by 30 micrometres (μm). The ascospores are grey, warty in texture, and typically divided into two compartments of equal size, although the upper cell may be slightly larger. They measure 35–45 by 13–15 μm, have rounded ends, and often develop two additional pseudosepta, which makes them appear 3-septate.

Asexual reproductive structures (pycnidia) occur between the ascomata and along the prothallus lines, although the conidia have not been observed. Standard chemical spot tests (UV and K) are negative, and thin-layer chromatography has not revealed any detectable secondary metabolites.

== Distribution ==
Bogoriella queenslandica has a pantropical distribution, with records from Central and South America (Costa Rica and Colombia), Southeast Asia (Indonesia), the Pacific region (Papua New Guinea), and Australia.
