= Bogoriella modesta =

Scientific classification
- Kingdom: Fungi
- Division: Ascomycota
- Class: Dothideomycetes
- Order: Trypetheliales
- Family: Trypetheliaceae
- Genus: Bogoriella
- Species: B. modesta

Binomial name
- Bogoriella modesta (Müll.Arg.) Aptroot & Lücking (2016)

Synonyms
- Microthelia modesta Müll.Arg. (1894); Mycomicrothelia modesta (Müll.Arg.) D.Hawksw. (1985)

Species of lichen

Bogoriella modesta is a species of corticolous (bark-dwelling) crustose lichen in the family Trypetheliaceae. This widespread tropical lichen forms olive-coloured crusty patches on tree bark and produces small, solitary dark fruiting bodies that are among the smallest in its genus. It has an unusually broad distribution for a tropical lichen, being found in both Central America and East Asia.

== Taxonomy ==
The species was first described in 1894 by Johannes Müller Argoviensis as Microthelia modesta, based on material collected in Jalisco, Mexico. In 1985, David Hawksworth transferred the taxon to the genus Mycomicrothelia. It was later placed in the genus Bogoriella by André Aptroot and Robert Lücking, where it is now recognised as Bogoriella modesta. The holotype specimen, collected by John Wiegand Eckfeldt (no. 182), is housed in the Geneva herbarium (G).

== Description ==
Bogoriella modesta has an olive-coloured thallus that lacks visible prothallus lines. Its fruiting bodies (ascomata) are solitary, measuring 0.2–0.4 mm across and 0.07–0.09 mm tall (rarely up to 0.10 mm), with walls 20–35 micrometres (μm) thick. The asci are 63–67 by 17–20 μm. The ascospores are olive-brown, warty in texture, and usually divided into two equal compartments, although the upper cell may be slightly larger. They are 19–22 μm long (sometimes as small as 17.5 μm or as long as 23 μm) and 8.5–10 μm wide (occasionally ranging from 8.0 to 10.5 μm), with rounded ends. No asexual reproductive structures (pycnidia) have been observed. Both the thallus and ascomata are negative in standard chemical spot tests (UV and K), and thin-layer chromatography has not revealed any secondary metabolites.

== Distribution ==
Bogoriella modesta has a pantropical distribution, with records from Mexico and Costa Rica in Central America, as well as from South Korea and Japan in East Asia.
