= Bogoriella apposita =

Scientific classification
- Kingdom: Fungi
- Division: Ascomycota
- Class: Dothideomycetes
- Order: Trypetheliales
- Family: Trypetheliaceae
- Genus: Bogoriella
- Species: B. apposita

Binomial name
- Bogoriella apposita (Nyl.) Aptroot & Lücking (2016)

Synonyms
- Verrucaria apposita Nyl. (1863); Microthelia apposita (Nyl.) Müll.Arg. (1883); Arthopyrenia apposita (Nyl.) H.Olivier (1902); Mycomicrothelia apposita (Nyl.) D.Hawksw. (1985)

Species of lichen

Bogoriella apposita is a species of corticolous (bark-dwelling) crustose lichen in the family Trypetheliaceae. Found in Colombia, this neotropical lichen forms whitish crusty patches on surfaces and produces small, dark fruiting bodies that break through the lichen's surface. It can be distinguished from similar species by its distinctive reddish-brown, warty spores that are divided into two unequal compartments.

== Taxonomy ==
The species was first described in 1863 by William Nylander as Verrucaria apposita, based on material collected in Colombia. It was later transferred to several different genera, appearing as Arthopyrenia apposita in 1902, Microthelia apposita in 1903, and Mycomicrothelia apposita in 1985. In 2016, André Aptroot and Robert Lücking reassigned the species to the genus Bogoriella, giving it its current name, Bogoriella apposita. The holotype specimen, collected by Alejandro Lindig in Choachí, Colombia, is preserved in Nylander's herbarium (H-Nyl 702).

In their 2016 revision of the Trypetheliaceae, Aptroot and Lücking mention the similarity between B. apposita, B. obovata and B. thelena, and note that B. thelena has priority if it is later determined that they are the same species.

== Description ==
Bogoriella apposita has a whitish thallus that lacks any visible prothallus lines. Its fruiting bodies (ascomata) are small, about 0.4 mm across and 0.15–0.20 mm tall, and break through the surface of the thallus. Each has a wall 40–80 micrometres (μm) thick and contains asci measuring 90–120 by 14–16 μm. The ascospores are reddish brown, warty in texture, and divided into two compartments with the upper one larger. They are typically 24–28 μm long (rarely as short as 22 μm or as long as nearly 30 μm) and 9–11.5 μm wide (with extremes between 8.5 and 12.5 μm). The spores have narrowed ends. No asexual reproductive structures (pycnidia) are present. Standard chemical spot tests (UV, K) are negative, and thin-layer chromatography reveals no detectable secondary metabolites.

== Distribution ==
Bogoriella apposita is found in Colombia.
