= Alloarthopyrenia =

Scientific classification
- Kingdom: Fungi
- Division: Ascomycota
- Class: Dothideomycetes
- Order: Trypetheliales
- Family: Trypetheliaceae
- Genus: Alloarthopyrenia; Phukhams., Lücking & K.D.Hyde (2016)
- Species: A. italica

Binomial name
- Alloarthopyrenia italica Phukhams., Camporesi, Ariyaw. & K.D.Hyde (2016)

Species of lichen

Alloarthopyrenia is a monotypic fungal genus in the family Trypetheliaceae. It contains the single species Alloarthopyrenia italica, a little-known fungus that lives as a saprotroph on living tree branches. The fungus is known from material collected in Italy, for which it is named.

== Taxonomy ==
Both the genus Alloarthopyrenia and its species were described as new to science in 2016. The genus name alludes to its resemblance to the genus Arthopyrenia, while the species epithet italica refers to the country from where the type material was collected.

Molecular phylogenetic analysis showed that the new species formed a distinct lineage in the Trypetheliaceae, a family that contains mostly lichen-forming fungi. The authors note that despite the absence of lichenization, "the internal anatomy of Alloarthopyrenia is otherwise typical of Trypetheliaceae, with the hamathecium forming a network of anastomosing hyphae embedded in a gelatinous matrix, bitunicate asci, transversely septate, and hyaline ascospores". Alloarthopyrenia is an early-diverging lineage in the Trypetheliaceae, along with Bogoriella, Constrictolumina, Macroconstrictolumina, Polypyrenula, and Pseudobogoriella.

== Description ==
While a distinct thallus is not present in Alloarthopyrenia, the region surrounding the ascomata may show a partial whitish hue. The sexual morph ascostromata has a leathery texture and is either semi-immersed, allowing only the ostioles to be visible, or covered with a blackened pseudoclypeus. These structures can range from being solitary to gregarious and have a shape that is described as depressed globose to obpyriform. The exterior wall of the ascostromata is rough, with colours ranging from black to dark brown.

The ostiole is located at the centre and contains periphyses. The peridium has a colour gradient from dark brown to light brown, consisting of cells that have either a textura angularis or textura epidermoidea arrangement. This composition makes it fragile and, at its base, it becomes nearly indistinguishable from the tissue of the host tree. Inside, the hamathecium is formed by trabeculate (network-like) pseudoparaphyses that are branched and anastomosing, set within a gelatinous matrix.

The asci contain eight spores, have a thick wall, and are bitunicate. They are shaped ovoid to somewhat oblong, and have a short pedicel. The apex is rounded and houses an ocular chamber, with a faint IKI-reactive (iodine-potassium iodide solution) bluish hue. The ascospores, either partially overlapping or biseriate in arrangement, are hyaline and can be ovoid or ellipsoid. They are septate and have a constriction at the septa. As they mature, their rough walls develop indentations, and they are encompassed by a mucilaginous sheath. The asexual morph of Alloarthopyrenia remains undetermined.

== Habitat and distribution ==
Alloarthopyrenia italica is known to occur on living branches of Fraxinus ornus. The authors suggest that it is likely saprotrophic.
