= Bogoriella decipiens =

Scientific classification
- Kingdom: Fungi
- Division: Ascomycota
- Class: Dothideomycetes
- Order: Trypetheliales
- Family: Trypetheliaceae
- Genus: Bogoriella
- Species: B. decipiens

Binomial name
- Bogoriella decipiens (Müll.Arg.) Aptroot & Lücking (2016)

Synonyms
- Anthracothecium decipiens Müll.Arg. (1885); Mycomicrothelia decipiens (Müll.Arg.) R.C.Harris (1989)

Species of lichen

Bogoriella decipiens is a species of corticolous (bark-dwelling) crustose lichen in the family Trypetheliaceae. This widespread tropical lichen forms pale brownish to whitish crusty patches bordered by distinctive dark lines and produces solitary, dark fruiting bodies with broad edges. It can be distinguished from similar species by its grey, smooth ascospores that are typically divided into 2-4 compartments, though the number can vary considerably. The species has a pantropical distribution and has been found across diverse regions including the Caribbean, Central America, Southeast Asia, and the Pacific.

== Taxonomy ==
The species was originally described in 1885 by Johannes Müller Argoviensis as Anthracothecium decipiens, based on a Cuban specimen collected by Charles Wright. It was later transferred to Mycomicrothelia by Richard Harris in 1989. In 2016, André Aptroot and Robert Lücking reassigned it to the genus Bogoriella, where it is now recognised as Bogoriella decipiens. The holotype is preserved in the herbarium at Geneva (G).

Two later taxa have been placed in synonymy with this species. Alexander Zahlbruckner described Bogoriella subpersicina in 1928 from material collected in Java, Indonesia, with the holotype housed in Vienna (W). In 1997, Aptroot introduced Ornatopyrenis muriformis from Papua New Guinea, based on a collection from Madang Province (holotype in Berlin, B). Both are now regarded as the same species as B. decipiens.

== Description ==
Bogoriella decipiens has a thallus that is pale brownish to whitish in colour, bordered by distinct dark prothallus lines. Its fruiting bodies (ascomata) are solitary, 0.7–0.9 mm in diameter and about 0.2 mm tall, each with a broad fringe. The asci measure around 100 by 28 micrometres (μm). The ascospores are grey, smooth, and rounded at the ends, typically divided into 2–4 compartments, though occasionally as few as one or as many as eight; they are 25–35 μm long and 12–15 μm wide. No pycnidia have been observed. Both the thallus and ascomata give negative results in standard chemical spot tests (UV and K), and thin-layer chromatography has not revealed any detectable lichen substances.

== Distribution ==
Bogoriella decipiens has a pantropical distribution, with records from Cuba, Guyana, the Philippines, Indonesia, and Papua New Guinea. It has also been reported from Mexico, where a specimen was collected in Yucatán at Chichén Itzá in 1993.
