= Bogoriella confluens =

Scientific classification
- Kingdom: Fungi
- Division: Ascomycota
- Class: Dothideomycetes
- Order: Trypetheliales
- Family: Trypetheliaceae
- Genus: Bogoriella
- Species: B. confluens

Binomial name
- Bogoriella confluens (Müll.Arg.) Aptroot & Lücking (2016)

Synonyms
- Microthelia confluens Müll.Arg. (1885); Verrucaria confluxa (Müll.Arg.) Stizenb. (1891); Mycomicrothelia confluens (Müll.Arg.) D.Hawksw. (1985)

Species of lichen

Bogoriella confluens is a species of lichen in the family Trypetheliaceae. This tropical lichen has an almost invisible crust-like thallus and produces clusters of small, dark fruiting bodies that share a common border, giving them a merged appearance. It has a wide distribution across tropical regions, having been found in Central America, southern Africa, and Fiji.

== Taxonomy ==
Bogoriella confluens was first described in 1885 by Johannes Müller Argoviensis as Microthelia confluens, based on material collected in the Cape of Good Hope, South Africa. It was later transferred to Verrucaria in 1891 by Ernst Stizenberger, though that name was illegitimate because it had already been used for a different taxon. In 1985, David Hawksworth placed the species in Mycomicrothelia. André Aptroot and Robert Lücking subsequently reassigned it to the genus Bogoriella, where it now resides as Bogoriella confluens. The holotype specimen is preserved in the herbarium at Geneva (G).

== Description ==
Bogoriella confluens has a thallus that is indistinct or scarcely visible. Its fruiting bodies (ascomata) occur in clusters of 2–8, sharing a common fringe that is 200–400 μm wide. Each ascoma is 0.8–1.0 mm across and 0.12–0.17 mm tall, with a wall 60–100 μm thick. The ascospores are golden brown, warty in texture, and measure 22–25 by 7.5–9.0 μm (sometimes as small as 21 μm long or up to 10.5 μm wide). They have rounded ends and are divided into two compartments, which may be equal in size or with the upper cell slightly larger. No asexual reproductive structures (pycnidia) have been observed. Both the thallus and ascomata are negative in standard chemical spot tests (UV and K), and thin-layer chromatography detects no secondary metabolites.

== Distribution ==
Bogoriella confluens has a pantropical distribution, with records from Central America (Costa Rica), southern Africa (South Africa), and the Pacific region (Fiji).
