= Bogoriella pachytheca =

Scientific classification
- Kingdom: Fungi
- Division: Ascomycota
- Class: Dothideomycetes
- Order: Trypetheliales
- Family: Trypetheliaceae
- Genus: Bogoriella
- Species: B. pachytheca

Binomial name
- Bogoriella pachytheca (Sacc., Syd. & P.Syd.) Aptroot & Lücking (2016)

Synonyms
- Didymosphaeria pachytheca Sacc., Syd. & P.Syd. (1901); Mycomicrothelia pachytheca (Sacc., Syd. & P.Syd.) Aptroot (1995)

Species of lichen

Bogoriella pachytheca is a species of corticolous (bark-dwelling) crustose lichen in the family Trypetheliaceae. This inconspicuous neotropical lichen has a thallus that is often barely visible and produces small, solitary, cone-shaped dark fruiting bodies with apical openings. It is currently known only from Brazil, where it was originally collected on São Francisco do Sul, and appears to have a restricted distribution within the neotropics.

== Taxonomy ==
Bogoriella pachytheca was first described in 1900 by Pier Andrea Saccardo, Hans Sydow, and Paul Sydow as Didymosphaeria pachytheca, based on material collected in Brazil on São Francisco do Sul. In 1995, André Aptroot transferred the species to the genus Mycomicrothelia. It was later reclassified in Bogoriella by Aptroot and Robert Lücking in 2016, where it is currently recognised as Bogoriella pachytheca. The holotype specimen, collected by Ernst Ule (no. 403), is preserved in the herbarium at Stockholm (S).

== Description ==
Bogoriella pachytheca has a thallus that is indistinct and often barely visible. Its fruiting bodies (ascomata) are solitary, conical in shape, and measure 0.2–0.4 mm in diameter, each with an apical opening. The ascospores are about 21–22 micrometres (μm) long and 8 μm wide, brown and finely warty, with rounded upper ends and tapered lower ends. No pycnidia have been observed. Both the thallus and ascomata are negative in standard chemical spot tests (UV and K), and thin-layer chromatography has not revealed any detectable secondary metabolites.

== Distribution ==
Bogoriella pachytheca has a neotropical distribution, having been reported from Brazil.
