= Bogoriella chiquitana =

Scientific classification
- Kingdom: Fungi
- Division: Ascomycota
- Class: Dothideomycetes
- Order: Trypetheliales
- Family: Trypetheliaceae
- Genus: Bogoriella
- Species: B. chiquitana

Binomial name
- Bogoriella chiquitana (Flakus, Kukwa & Aptroot) Lücking, R.Miranda & Aptroot (2020)
- Holotype: Kaa‑Iya del Gran Chaco protected area, Bolivia

Synonyms
- Constrictolumina chiquitana Flakus, Kukwa & Aptroot (2016)

Species of lichen

Bogoriella chiquitana is a species of corticolous (bark-dwelling) crustose lichen in the family Trypetheliaceae, described from dry lowland forest in eastern Bolivia. It forms a very thin film in the outer bark and produces small, black, pore-tipped fruiting bodies with brown spores. The species was introduced in 2016 (as Constrictolumina chiquitana) and later reclassified in Bogoriella following broader phylogenetic work on this group.

== Taxonomy ==
The species was described by Adam Flakus, Martin Kukwa, and André Aptroot in 2016 from the Kaa-Iya del Gran Chaco protected area (Santa Cruz Department, Bolivia), where the type was collected in Chiquitano forest. The epithet refers to that regional vegetation type. At the time, the authors placed it in Constrictolumina and emphasised its distinctive brown spores with one cross-wall (1-septate) that may develop additional internal walls to become submuriform (partly divided into several small chambers).

Subsequent multi-gene analyses and a morphology-based "binning" of unsequenced species showed that Bogoriella and Novomicrothelia (and related segregates) intergrade and should be treated as a single genus. In that framework, Constrictolumina chiquitana was recombined as Bogoriella chiquitana by Lücking, R. Miranda, and Aptroot. The revised concept of Bogoriella accommodates species with small, often muriform or submuriform spores and perithecioid (pore-tipped) fruiting bodies; a separate basal lineage is recognised as Pseudobogoriella.

== Description ==
The thallus (lichen body) is very thin (around 0.1 mm), smooth and continuous, grayish-white, and lacks a cortex (ecorticate). It grows within the outer bark (endophloeodal), does not induce bark swellings, and can cover patches up to roughly 15 cm (6 in) across. There is no dark border (no prothallus).

Fruiting bodies (ascomata) are single, round to slightly elongate black warts 0.3–0.5 mm wide that sit from nearly flush with the surface to clearly raised. Each has a tiny pore at the top (an apical ostiole). A thin, carbonised, shield-like cap (the clypeus) spreads well beyond the fruiting body and gives it a gray-black rim about 0.6–1.4 mm across; the base of the fruiting body remains embedded in the bark. The wall is fully carbonised and differentiated into an inner pseudoparenchymatous excipulum (to about 40 μm) and an outer involucrellum (about 30–60 μm) that expands outward to form the clypeus. The internal inter-asci tissue (hamathecium) is clear. Asci contain eight ascospores.

Ascospores are brown, narrowly ellipsoid with rounded ends, and distinctly constricted; most have a single cross-wall (1-septate), but some develop additional partial walls and become submuriform. They measure 26–48 × 12–17 μm, show a delicate warty surface under the microscope, and lack an external gelatinous sheath. In a standard K test applied to spores, the color shifts gray (K+ gray), while spot tests on the thallus and fruiting bodies are negative (UV−, K−), and thin-layer chromatography detects no secondary metabolites. Asexual structures (pycnidia) were not observed.

== Habitat and distribution ==
Bogoriella chiquitana is so far known only from its type locality in eastern Bolivia, where it grows on tree bark in lowland, seasonally dry Chiquitano forest around 340 m (1,120 ft) elevation. The species forms a thin, bark-embedded film and produces scattered, shielded black fruiting bodies on the bark surface.
