= Astrothelium novemseptatum =

Scientific classification
- Kingdom: Fungi
- Division: Ascomycota
- Class: Dothideomycetes
- Order: Trypetheliales
- Family: Trypetheliaceae
- Genus: Astrothelium
- Species: A. novemseptatum

Binomial name
- Astrothelium novemseptatum Aptroot & M.Cáceres (2016)

Species of lichen-forming fungus

Astrothelium novemseptatum is a species of corticolous (bark-dwelling) lichen in the family Trypetheliaceae. It was first identified in Brazil, and has since been found in Guyana and Colombia. The lichen is characterized by its corticate, smooth, and somewhat shiny thallus, as well as its pyriform ascomata.

== Taxonomy ==
Astrothelium novemseptatum was fornally described as a new species in 2016 by lichenologists André Aptroot and Marcela Cáceres. The type specimen was collected from Rondônia, Porto Velho, at the Parque Natural Municipal de Porto Velho. The species is most similar to Astrothelium eumultiseptatum, but it lacks lichexanthone in the thallus or pseudostroma.

== Description ==
The thallus of Astrothelium novemseptatum is corticate, smooth, somewhat shiny, and continuous, with a pale greenish-grey colour. It covers areas up to 7 cm (2.8 in) in diameter and is approximately 0.2 mm thick. The thallus may or may not have a black prothallus line about 0.3 mm wide. The ascomata are pyriform, with diameters ranging from 0.4 to 0.7 mm. They are mostly aggregated with 4–10 ascomata, immersed in the bark tissue below pseudostromata, which are distinctly raised above the thallus and mostly oval in outline. The wall of the ascomata is carbonized and up to 40 μm thick. The ostioles are eccentric, fused, flat, pale brown, and surrounded by a whitish zone. The hamathecium is not inspersed with oil globules. The asci contain 8 ascospores, which are hyaline, 9-septate, fusiform, 49–55 by 12–17 μm in size, with pointed ends and diamond-shaped lumina.

== Habitat and distribution ==
Astrothelium novemseptatum is found on smooth bark of trees in primary forests. It has been documented in Brazil, Guyana, and Colombia. In Brazil, additional specimens have been observed in Guyana's Essequibo River and Potaro-Siparuni Region, as well as in Colombia's Amazonas region.

== See also ==
- List of lichens of Brazil
