= Astrothelium xanthosuperbum =

Scientific classification
- Domain: Eukaryota
- Kingdom: Fungi
- Division: Ascomycota
- Class: Dothideomycetes
- Order: Trypetheliales
- Family: Trypetheliaceae
- Genus: Astrothelium
- Species: A. xanthosuperbum

Binomial name
- Astrothelium xanthosuperbum Aptroot & M.Cáceres (2016)

Species of lichen

Astrothelium xanthosuperbum is a species of corticolous (bark-dwelling) lichen in the family Trypetheliaceae. It is found in Rondônia, Brazil. The species is characterized by its large muriform ascospores and is similar in appearance to Astrothelium disjunctum.

== Taxonomy ==
Astrothelium xanthosuperbum was described by André Aptroot and Marcela Cáceres in 2016. The type specimen was collected by the authors from the Sítio Ecológico Buriti on Lago Cujubim (Porto Velho, Rondônia), where it was found growing on tree bark in a disturbed forest.

== Description ==
The thallus of Astrothelium xanthosuperbum is corticate, smooth, shiny, continuous, and olive-green, covering areas up to 3 cm (1.2 in) in diameter. It is less than 0.1 mm thick and surrounded by a dark black prothallus line, about 0.3 mm wide. The lichen induces gall formation on the host bark, making the bark pieces slightly concave and thickened along the cracks so that they are almost flaking off.

Ascomata are spherical, measuring 0.4–0.7 mm in diameter, and are solitary or aggregated in groups of 2–6, immersed in pseudostroma. Pseudostromata are black and raised above the thallus. The wall is black all around, up to about 50 μm thick. Ostioles are apical, flat, dark brown, and often surrounded by a pale brown ring. Asci contain 8 ascospores, which are hyaline, muriform, ellipsoid, and measure 130–160 by 28–35 μm.

In terms of standard chemical spot tests, the thallus surface is UV+ (yellow), and the thallus medulla is K−. Thin-layer chromatography reveals the presence of lichexanthone, a lichen product that causes the thallus to fluoresce when lit with a long-wavelength UV light.

== Habitat and distribution ==
Astrothelium xanthosuperbum is found on the smooth bark of trees in disturbed rainforests. The species is currently known only from Brazil.
