= Astrothelium obtectum =

Scientific classification
- Kingdom: Fungi
- Division: Ascomycota
- Class: Dothideomycetes
- Order: Trypetheliales
- Family: Trypetheliaceae
- Genus: Astrothelium
- Species: A. obtectum

Binomial name
- Astrothelium obtectum Lücking, M.P.Nelsen & Benatti (2016)
- Type locality: Serra do Caraça, Brazil

Species of lichen-forming fungus

Astrothelium obtectum is a species of lichen-forming fungus in the family Trypetheliaceae. The lichen forms an olive-green crust on tree bark with a coarsely folded surface texture. Its reproductive structures are grouped together in rounded to irregular clusters that are covered by greenish tissue and share a common central opening, and the clusters fluoresce orange-yellow under ultraviolet light. The species is known from Atlantic Forest in southeastern Brazil, where it grows along forest trails near streams.

== Taxonomy ==
Astrothelium obtectum was described as a new species by Robert Lücking, Matthew Nelsen, and Michel Navarro Benatti. The type material was collected in Brazil (Minas Gerais, Serra do Caraça) on July 27, 2010, where it was found growing on bark in Atlantic rainforest at about 1,300–1,400 m (4,300–4,600 ft) elevation, along a forest trail near a small river.

The species differs from the similar A. nigrocacuminum by having smaller ascospores. The epithet obtectum refers to the perithecia (flask-shaped fruiting bodies), which are immersed and largely concealed beneath thallus tissue. In overall structure it fits a typical Astrothelium form and has been compared with species such as A. leucoconicum and A. nigrocacuminum; it is separated from A. leucoconicum by its clear hymenium and by ascospores that are slightly shorter and much narrower.

In a later molecular analysis, Astrothelium obtectum appeared as sister to A. scorizum.

== Description ==
The thallus is crustose and grows on bark, forming a continuous olive-green patch up to about 10 cm (4 in) across. Its surface is coarsely folded. In cross section, the cortex is massive and cartilage-like, with a distinct photobiont layer positioned near the surface, while the medulla is indistinct and immersed within the modified outer bark.

The perithecia are aggregated, typically five to ten together, in rounded to irregular, diffuse pseudostromata. The pseudostromata are about 2–5 mm (0.08–0.2 in) across, erumpent (pushing through and rupturing the surface), and up to about 1.5 mm thick, and are covered by an olive-green thallus layer up to a shared ostiole near the center. The ostioles are fused and eccentric (positioned to one side), forming a common opening. They are papillate and about 0.2–0.5 mm wide, brown with a surrounding cream-colored zone. Individual perithecia are pear-shaped, about 0.4–0.6 mm wide and up to 1 mm high. The excipulum is carbonized (blackened) and about 50–80 μm thick, and the spaces between perithecia are filled with amorphous orange-brown tissue. The hamathecium consists of densely interwoven, net-like paraphyses embedded in a clear gelatinous matrix (not staining in Lugol's iodine, or IKI−), and the ostiolar channel is also clear.

Each ascus contains eight ascospores. The ascospores are hyaline, spindle-shaped, and three-septate, with distosepta and diamond-shaped lumina, measuring about 50–60 × 14–17 μm (IKI−). The pseudostromata are thinly covered with lichexanthone and fluoresce orange-yellow under ultraviolet light (UV+ orange-yellow).

== Habitat and distribution ==
Astrothelium obtectum is known from Atlantic Forest in southeastern Brazil. The type collection was made in the Serra do Caraça (Minas Gerais) in relatively well-preserved gallery forest along a small river, where it grew on bark beside a trail through forest. At the time of its original publication, the species was known only from the type locality area in Minas Gerais, Brazil, at about 1,300–1,400 m elevation. It has since been recorded from an adjoining state, Espírito Santo.

== See also ==
- List of lichens of Brazil
