= Astrothelium duplicatum =

Scientific classification
- Kingdom: Fungi
- Division: Ascomycota
- Class: Dothideomycetes
- Order: Trypetheliales
- Family: Trypetheliaceae
- Genus: Astrothelium
- Species: A. duplicatum

Binomial name
- Astrothelium duplicatum Aptroot & M.Cáceres (2016)

Species of lichen-forming fungus

Astrothelium duplicatum is a species of corticolous (bark-dwelling), crustose lichen in the family Trypetheliaceae. Found in Brazil, it was formally described as a new species in 2016 by lichenologists André Aptroot and Marcela Cáceres. The type specimen was collected by the authors in the Parque Natural Municipal de Porto Velho (Porto Velho, Rondônia), where it was found growing on the smooth bark of a tree in a park near a rainforest, and on tree twigs in the forest. The lichen has a smooth and somewhat shiny, olive-green thallus surrounded by a black prothallus (about 0.3 mm wide) and covers areas of up to 5 cm (2 in) in diameter. The presence of the lichen does not induce the formation of galls in its host. The ascomata are roughly spherical (globose) and typically aggregate in groups of about five to fifty, usually immersed in the bark tissue as pseudostromata. Its ascospores are hyaline, spindle-shaped (fusiform) and measure 45–55 by 11–15 μm. The use of thin-layer chromatography on collected lichen samples revealed the presence of an anthraquinone compound, possibly parietin. The characteristics that distinguish Astrothelium duplicatum from other members of Astrothelium include the internal, yellow pigment of its ascomata; and the dimensions of its ascospores, which are about 3–4 times as long as they are broad. Astrothelium mesoduplex is similar in appearance, but that species lacks yellow to orange pseudostromata and has shorter ascospores.

== See also ==
- List of lichens of Brazil
