= Bogoriella thelena =

Scientific classification
- Kingdom: Fungi
- Division: Ascomycota
- Class: Dothideomycetes
- Order: Trypetheliales
- Family: Trypetheliaceae
- Genus: Bogoriella
- Species: B. thelena

Binomial name
- Bogoriella thelena (Ach.) Aptroot & Lücking 2016

Synonyms
- List: Verrucaria thelena Ach. (1814); Pyrenula thelena (Ach.) Trevis. (1853); Microthelia thelena (Ach.) Trevis. (1860); Mycomicrothelia thelena (Ach.) D.Hawksw. (1985); Microthelia albidella Müll.Arg. 1883); Microthelia thelena var. subtriseptata Vain. (1890); Microthelia leucothallina Vain. (1915); Didymosphaeria palaquii Vain. (1921)

Species of lichen

Bogoriella thelena is a species of corticolous (bark-dwelling) crustose lichen in the family Trypetheliaceae. This widespread tropical lichen forms creamy to whitish crusty patches bordered by dark lines on tree bark and produces solitary, small dark fruiting bodies that are sometimes surrounded by a fringe. It has a broad distribution among tropical lichens, being found across the Americas from Costa Rica to Brazil, as well as in the West Indies, Philippines, and Hawaiian Islands.

== Taxonomy ==
Bogoriella thelena was first described in 1814 by Erik Acharius as Verrucaria thelena. It was later transferred to Microthelia by Trevisan in 1860, and then placed in Mycomicrothelia by David Hawksworth in 1985. In 2016, André Aptroot and Robert Lücking reassigned it to the genus Bogoriella, giving the species its present name. The holotype is preserved in Acharius's herbarium in Helsinki (H-ACH 692B).

Several other names are now considered synonyms of this species. Microthelia albidella, described by Johannes Müller Argoviensis in 1883 from Brazil, is based on a specimen housed in Geneva (G). Edvard Vainio introduced Microthelia thelena var. subtriseptata in 1890 from Brazil, with an isotype (a duplicate) preserved at the Natural History Museum in London (BM). Vainio also described Microthelia leucothallina in 1915 from the Danish West Indies and Didymosphaeria palaquii in 1921 from the Philippines. All of these taxa are now treated as synonyms of Bogoriella thelena.

== Description ==
Bogoriella thelena has a thallus that is creamy, whitish, or sometimes indistinct, and it is bordered by dark prothallus lines. Its fruiting bodies (ascomata) are solitary, about 0.5 mm across and 0.10–0.25 mm tall, with an apical opening and sometimes surrounded by a fringe. The ascomatal wall is 30–70 micrometres (μm) thick. The asci measure 80–90 μm long (occasionally up to 100 μm) and 26–31 μm wide (sometimes as narrow as 23 μm).

The ascospores are deep golden brown, warty in texture, and divided into two compartments, with the upper cell larger. They are generally 21–24 μm long (ranging from 17.5 to 26 μm) and 9–11.5 μm wide (occasionally 7.5–13 μm), and have rounded ends. No asexual reproductive structures (pycnidia) have been observed. Standard chemical spot tests (UV and K) are negative, and thin-layer chromatography has revealed no detectable secondary metabolites.

== Distribution ==
Bogoriella thelena has a pantropical range, with records from Central and South America (Costa Rica, Colombia, Ecuador, and Brazil), the West Indies, the Philippines, and the Hawaiian Islands.
