= Astrothelium vulcanum =

Scientific classification
- Kingdom: Fungi
- Division: Ascomycota
- Class: Dothideomycetes
- Order: Trypetheliales
- Family: Trypetheliaceae
- Genus: Astrothelium
- Species: A. vulcanum

Binomial name
- Astrothelium vulcanum Aptroot (2016)

Species of lichen

Astrothelium vulcanum is a species of corticolous (bark-dwelling) lichen in the family Trypetheliaceae. Found in Guyana, it was formally described as a new species in 2016 by André Aptroot. The type specimen was collected from the Kuyuwini Landing (Rupununi) at an elevation of 200 m (660 ft); here, in a savannah forest, it was found growing on the smooth bark of trees. The lichen has a smooth, somewhat shiny thallus surrounded by a thin black prothallus, and covering areas up to 25 cm (10 in) in diameter. Its ascospores are spindle-shaped (fusiform) with rounded edges, with three septa and dimensions of 20–25 by 6.5–7.5 μm. Astrothelium vulcanum contains lichexanthone, a lichen product that causes the thallus to fluoresce when lit with a long-wavelength UV light.

Astrothelium infravulcanum, found in Brazil and described as a new species in 2022, was named for its similar appearance to A. vulcanum, but is distinguished by its smaller ascospores, which measure 14–17 by 5–6 μm.
