= Bogoriella xanthonica =

Scientific classification
- Kingdom: Fungi
- Division: Ascomycota
- Class: Dothideomycetes
- Order: Trypetheliales
- Family: Trypetheliaceae
- Genus: Bogoriella
- Species: B. xanthonica

Binomial name
- Bogoriella xanthonica (Komposch, Aptroot & Hafellner) Aptroot & Lücking (2016)
- Holotype: Alto Orinoco, Venezuela

Synonyms
- Mycomicrothelia xanthonica Komposch, Aptroot & Hafellner (2002)

Species of lichen

Bogoriella xanthonica is a species of corticolous (bark-dwelling) crustose lichen in the family Trypetheliaceae. This neotropical canopy lichen forms whitish to creamy crusty patches outlined by dark lines on tree bark high in Venezuelan rainforest canopies. It is distinguished by its yellow fluorescence under ultraviolet light due to the presence of lichexanthone, a lichen product that helps identify this species.

== Taxonomy ==
Bogoriella xanthonica was originally described in 2002 by Christian Komposch, André Aptroot, and Josef Hafellner as Mycomicrothelia xanthonica. The type specimen was collected in Venezuela, in the state of Amazonas, within the Alto Orinoco about 15 km (9.3 mi) west-southwest of La Esmeralda. It was found at around 110 m elevation on the west bank of the Surumoni river, in tropical lowland rainforest. The lichen was growing on the smooth bark of a thick branch of a Vochysia vismiifolia a tree that was about 20 m (66 ft) tall. The holotype is housed in VEN, with an isotype preserved in the Graz herbarium (GZU). The species epithet xanthonica alludes to the presence of the compound lichexanthone, the first time this lichen product had been documented from Mycomicrothelia. In 2016, Aptroot and Robert Lücking transferred the taxon to the genus Bogoriella, giving it its current name.

== Description ==
Bogoriella xanthonica has a whitish to creamy thallus outlined by dark prothallus lines. Its fruiting bodies (ascomata) are solitary, 0.5–0.7 mm across (occasionally up to 0.8 mm) and 0.15–0.20 mm tall, each with a broad fringe and an apical opening. The hamathecium contains oil droplets, which are usually concentrated in the less fertile regions. The asci are 130–160 by 20–30 micrometre (μm). The ascospores are olive-brown, warty in texture, and divided into two compartments, with the upper cell slightly larger. They measure about 30–40 by 10–14 μm and have rounded ends.

Asexual reproductive structures (pycnidia) are present, 75–125 μm wide. These produce colorless, rod-shaped conidia that are slightly swollen just below the middle. The conidia measure about 12–15 μm long and 0.4 μm wide, with the swollen part reaching 0.8 μm across.

In chemical spot tests, the thallus reacts UV+ yellow (sometimes weakly), indicating the presence of lichexanthone, but it is K−. Thin-layer chromatography confirms lichexanthone as the only detectable secondary metabolite.

== Habitat and distribution ==
Bogoriella xanthonica is a neotropical species known from Venezuela. It is primarily a canopy-dwelling lichen, growing on the smooth to slightly fissured bark of branches high in the forest canopy. Most records come from upper canopy branches.
