= Astrothelium bivelum =

Scientific classification
- Kingdom: Fungi
- Division: Ascomycota
- Class: Dothideomycetes
- Order: Trypetheliales
- Family: Trypetheliaceae
- Genus: Astrothelium
- Species: A. bivelum

Binomial name
- Astrothelium bivelum Aptroot & M.Cáceres (2016)

Species of lichen-forming fungus

Astrothelium bivelum is a species of corticolous (bark-dwelling), crustose lichen in the family Trypetheliaceae. Found in Brazil, it was formally described as a new species in 2016 by lichenologists André Aptroot and Marcela Cáceres. The type specimen was collected by the authors in the Parque Natural Municipal de Porto Velho (Porto Velho, Rondônia), in a primary rainforest. The lichen has a smooth and somewhat shiny, ochraceous-green thallus with a 0.4 cm-wide rough and irregular prothallus; the thallus covers areas of up to 3 cm (1.2 in) in diameter. The presence of the lichen does not induce the formation of galls in the host. The ascomata are pear-shaped (pyriform), measure 0.5–0.7 mm in diameter, typically aggregate in groups of two to six, and are usually immersed in the bark tissue. The characteristics that distinguish it from other members of Astrothelium include the diffusely pseudostromatic, erumpent ascomata that are covered by thallus and have an external pink pigment, with each containing a single group of fused ascomata; and the 5-septate ascospores. A. bivelum is one of the few Astrothelium-like species with 5-septate ascospores that does not contain lichexanthone.

== See also ==
- List of lichens of Brazil
