= Astrothelium sexloculatum =

Scientific classification
- Kingdom: Fungi
- Division: Ascomycota
- Class: Dothideomycetes
- Order: Trypetheliales
- Family: Trypetheliaceae
- Genus: Astrothelium
- Species: A. sexloculatum

Binomial name
- Astrothelium sexloculatum Aptroot (2016)

Species of lichen

Astrothelium sexloculatum is a species of corticolous (bark-dwelling), crustose lichen in the family Trypetheliaceae. Found in Guyana and Papua New Guinea, it was formally described as a new species in 2016 by Dutch lichenologist André Aptroot. The type specimen was collected by Harrie Sipman on the Dadadanawa ranch (Rupununi savannah, Upper Takutu-Upper Essequibo, Guyana) at an altitude of 120 m (390 ft); there, it was found growing on smooth tree bark in a savanna. The lichen has a smooth and somewhat shiny, pale yellowish-grey thallus with a cortex and a thin (up to 0.1 mm wide) black prothallus line. It covers areas of up to 9 cm (3.5 in) in diameter. Both the thallus and the pseudostromata contain lichexanthone, a lichen product that causes these structures to fluoresce yellow when lit with a long-wavelength UV light. The combination of characteristics of the lichen that distinguish it from others in Astrothelium are the indistinctly pseudostromatic ascomata, with erumpent to prominent pseudostromata that are covered by thallus. The species epithet sexloculatum refers to the ascospores, which are divided into six chambers (locules) by five transverse septa.
