= Astrothelium rhinothallinum =

Scientific classification
- Kingdom: Fungi
- Division: Ascomycota
- Class: Dothideomycetes
- Order: Trypetheliales
- Family: Trypetheliaceae
- Genus: Astrothelium
- Species: A. rhinothallinum

Binomial name
- Astrothelium rhinothallinum Kalb & Aptroot (2018)

Species of lichen

Astrothelium rhinothallinum is a species of corticolous (bark-dwelling), crustose lichen in the family Trypetheliaceae, first described in 2018. It is found in Brazil.

== Taxonomy ==
Astrothelium rhinothallinum was formally described by the lichenologists Klaus Kalb and André Aptroot in 2018. The type specimen was collected by the first author in the Mantiqueira Mountains, Rio de Janeiro, Brazil on 15 March 1980. In a dense and humid submontane rainforest in the lower mountains, at an elevation of 1,050 m (3,440 ft), the lichen was growing on tree bark. The specific epithet rhinothallinum refers to the thallus, which, according to the authors, resembles the skin of a rhinoceros.

== Description ==
The thallus of Astrothelium rhinothallinum is dull and olivaceous green, and not surrounded by a prothallus. The ascomata are spherical to pyriform (pear-shaped), 0.7–1.2 mm in diameter, solitary in pseudostromatal warts. The pseudostroma is hemispherical, completely covered by a thallus layer, about 1.5 mm in diameter, and without pigmentation. Ostioles are apical, depressed, and brown. The hamathecium is inspersed with oil droplets. Ascospores number eight per ascus, and are hyaline, regularly muriform, and measure 65–71 by 16–19.5 μm. They have a long-ellipsoid shape, lack a distinctly thickened median septum, and are not surrounded by a wide gelatinous sheath. Pycnidia were not observed to occur in this species.

The thallus of Astrothelium rhinothallinum is patchily UV+ (yellow), C−, K−, KC−, and P−. Thin-layer chromatography analysis confirms the presence of lichexanthone.

== Habitat and distribution ==
Astrothelium rhinothallinum is found on tree bark in forest environments and at the time of its original publication, was known to occur only in Brazil.
