= Astrothelium flavomaculatum =

Scientific classification
- Kingdom: Fungi
- Division: Ascomycota
- Class: Dothideomycetes
- Order: Trypetheliales
- Family: Trypetheliaceae
- Genus: Astrothelium
- Species: A. flavomaculatum

Binomial name
- Astrothelium flavomaculatum Aptroot (2016)

Species of lichen

Astrothelium flavomaculatum is a species of corticolous (bark-dwelling), crustose lichen in the family Trypetheliaceae. Found in Guyana, Venezuela, and Ecuador, it was formally described as a new species in 2016 by Dutch lichenologist André Aptroot. The type specimen was collected by the author from the Cordillera del Cóndor (Morona-Santiago Province, Ecuador) at an altitude of 1,200 m (3,900 ft). The lichen has a shiny, smooth to somewhat bullate (convex and swollen) thallus that covers an area of up to 4 cm (1.6 in) in diameter. It is green with a thin orange pruina. Its ascospores are hyaline, ellipsoid in shape, and muriform (i.e. divided into internal chambers by transverse and longitudinal septa), with dimensions of 50–75 by 12–25 μm. It is somewhat similar in appearance to Astrothelium graphicum , but that species has somewhat smaller ascospores with lengths up to 66 μm.
