= Astrothelium infravulcanum =

Scientific classification
- Kingdom: Fungi
- Division: Ascomycota
- Class: Dothideomycetes
- Order: Trypetheliales
- Family: Trypetheliaceae
- Genus: Astrothelium
- Species: A. infravulcanum

Binomial name
- Astrothelium infravulcanum Aptroot (2022)
- Type locality: Reserva extrativista, Acre, Brazil

Species of lichen-forming fungus

Astrothelium infravulcanum is a species of corticolous (bark-dwelling), crustose lichen in the family Trypetheliaceae. This species was discovered in the rainforests of Acre, Brazil, and is distinguished by its unique features and chemical makeup.

== Taxonomy ==
Astrothelium infravulcanum was formally described as a new species in 2022 by the Dutch lichenologist André Aptroot, in a study highlighting new lichen species from Brazil. The type specimen was collected by Marcela Cáceres and Aptroot from the Comunidade Cuidado in the Cazumbá-Iracema Extractive Reserve (Sena Madureira, Acre, Brazil); there, at an elevation of 150 m (490 ft), it was found growing on bark in a rainforest. The species name infravulcanum signifies its resemblance to Astrothelium vulcanum but with distinctly smaller spores, hence infra indicating "below" or "smaller than" in Latin, pointing to the smaller size of its spores compared to those of A. vulcanum.

== Description ==
The species showcases a pale ochraceous (yellowish-brown) thallus, which is the body of the lichen, lacking a prothallus (a preliminary growth phase or border). The thallus emits a yellow fluorescence under UV light, indicating the presence of specific chemicals. Its reproductive structures, called ascomata, are globose to pyriform (globe to pear-shaped), measuring 0.2–0.4 mm in diameter, and mostly embedded within the thallus rather than lying on a separate supportive structure. These structures have a single, black opening (ostiole) at the top through which spores are released.

The internal structure (hamathecium) is interspersed with clear, oil-like globules. Spores are produced eight per ascus, are clear (hyaline), divided into three sections (3-septate), and measure 14–17 by 5–6 μm. These spores are long-ellipsoid in shape and do not have a surrounding gelatinous layer. The species does not form pycnidia, which are structures that produce asexual spores.

Chemically, the thallus reacts to UV light by turning yellow but shows negative reactions to standard lichen spot tests (C, P, and K tests), indicating the absence of certain chemicals typically searched for in lichen studies. The only chemical detected through thin-layer chromatography is lichexanthone, a xanthone compound common in some lichens and known for its yellow fluorescence under long-wavelength UV light.

== Habitat and distribution ==
Astrothelium infravulcanum is corticolous, meaning it grows on tree bark, specifically within the humid and biodiverse ecosystem of a Brazilian rainforest. At the time of its original publication, the lichen was only known to exist in its type locality within the state of Acre, Brazil.

== See also ==
- List of lichens of Brazil
