= Nigrovothelium bullatum =

Scientific classification
- Kingdom: Fungi
- Division: Ascomycota
- Class: Dothideomycetes
- Order: Trypetheliales
- Family: Trypetheliaceae
- Genus: Nigrovothelium
- Species: N. bullatum

Binomial name
- Nigrovothelium bullatum Lücking, Upreti & Lumbsch (2016)

Species of lichen-forming fungus

Nigrovothelium bullatum is a species of lichen-forming fungus in the family Trypetheliaceae. The lichen forms an olive-green to olive-brown crust on tree bark with a conspicuously blistered and warty surface texture that distinguishes it from related species. Its reproductive structures are small, black, densely arranged bodies that sit exposed on the lichen surface with separate ostioles appearing as tiny black dots. The species is found in tropical and subtropical regions of Asia, including India, Thailand, and Vietnam, where it grows on sun-exposed bark in fairly dry habitats.

== Taxonomy ==
Nigrovothelium bullatum was described as a new species by Robert Lücking, Dalip Kumar Upreti, and H. Thorsten Lumbsch. The type material was collected in India (Tamil Nadu, Eastern Ghats) near Mamallapuram, where it was found at about 40 m elevation on the bark of a cashew tree in disturbed dry evergreen forest.

The species is distinguished from the closely related N. tropicum by its strongly bullate thallus. Both species share similar perithecial anatomy and general morphology, but N. tropicum has a smooth to merely uneven thallus, whereas N. bullatum forms a markedly verrucose, blistered surface. The specific epithet bullatum refers to this strongly bullate growth form. Its recognition as a distinct species has been supported by molecular data, and it has been discussed in the context of the reclassification of the taxon formerly known as Trypethelium tropicum into Nigrovothelium.

== Description ==
The thallus is crustose and grows on bark, forming a continuous patch up to about 10 cm (4 in) across. It is olive-green to olive-brown with a conspicuously blistered, warty surface (verrucose-bullate). In cross section it has a thick, cartilaginous cortex, a distinct photobiont layer positioned near the surface, and a thick medulla.

The perithecia (flask-shaped fruiting bodies) are solitary but densely arranged and often confluent. They are sessile and exposed, black, and up to about 0.25 mm high, with separate apical ostioles about 0.2–0.3 mm in diameter; the ostiolar area is grey and the openings appear from above as tiny black dots. The excipulum is carbonised and about 50–100 μm thick in cross section. The hamathecium consists of densely interwoven, net-like paraphyses embedded in a clear gelatinous matrix (with no staining reaction in Lugol's iodine, or IKI−), and the ostiolar channel is also clear.

Each ascus contains eight ascospores. The ascospores are hyaline, spindle-shaped, and three-septate, with distosepta and diamond-shaped lumina, measuring about 20–25 × 8–10 μm (IKI−). No lichen substances were detected.

== Habitat and distribution ==
Nigrovothelium bullatum is known from southeastern India. It was collected in the Eastern Ghats of Tamil Nadu near Mamallapuram, where it grew on a cashew tree in disturbed dry evergreen forest at low elevation (about 40 m). It is also found in Thailand. In 2024, it was recorded from Vietnam, growing on sun-exposed bark in fairly dry habitats. All three species of Nigrovothelium occur in Vietnam.
