= Astrothelium nigrocacuminum =

Scientific classification
- Kingdom: Fungi
- Division: Ascomycota
- Class: Dothideomycetes
- Order: Trypetheliales
- Family: Trypetheliaceae
- Genus: Astrothelium
- Species: A. nigrocacuminum

Binomial name
- Astrothelium nigrocacuminum Flakus, Kukwa & Aptroot (2016)

Species of lichen

Astrothelium nigrocacuminum is a species of corticolous (bark-dwelling) lichen in the family Trypetheliaceae. Found in Bolivia, it was formally described as a new species in 2016 by lichenologists Adam Flakus, Martin Kukwa, and André Aptroot. The type specimen was collected between Apolo and Mapiri villages (Franz Tamayo Province, La Paz Department) at an altitude of 1,120 m (3,670 ft); there, in a sub-Andean Amazon forest, it was found growing on bark. It is only known to occur in the type locality. The species epithet alludes to the blackened tops of the ascomata, which protrude from the thallus. Astrothelium megochroleucum is most similar in appearance, but, unlike A. nigrocacuminum, that species has apical ostioles and stroma that fluoresce when lit with a long-wavelength UV light.
