= Astrothelium graphicum =

Scientific classification
- Kingdom: Fungi
- Division: Ascomycota
- Class: Dothideomycetes
- Order: Trypetheliales
- Family: Trypetheliaceae
- Genus: Astrothelium
- Species: A. graphicum

Binomial name
- Astrothelium graphicum Aptroot & S.M.A.Martins (2016)

Species of lichen-forming fungus

Astrothelium graphicum is a species of lichen in the family Trypetheliaceae. This lichen features an extended, reticulate pseudostroma that is lower than its slightly blistered (bullate) thallus.

== Taxonomy ==
The species was formally described as new to science in 2016 by the lichenologists André Aptroot and Suzana Maria de Azevedo Martins. The type collection was made in Santarém, Pará, Brazil, in September 2013.

== Description ==
The thallus of Astrothelium graphicum is corticate, smooth to somewhat bullate, and somewhat shiny. It is continuous, covering areas up to 4 cm (1.6 in) in diameter and approximately 0.3 mm thick. The thallus is green with a thin orange pruina and is not surrounded by a prothallus. It does not induce gall formation on the host bark.

Ascomata are spherical, measuring 0.3–0.4 mm in diameter, and are mostly aggregated in groups of 10–40. They are immersed in or even below the pseudostromata, which have a surface distinct from the thallus. The pseudostromata are not distinctly lower than the thallus, irregular in outline, anastomosing to meandering in a reticulate pattern, and can reach up to about 5 mm in diameter. They are ochraceous with a thin orange pruina, and the inside is also ochraceous without containing bark tissue. The wall is carbonised and up to about 80 μm thick. Ostioles are apical, not fused, flat, ochraceous to brown, and surrounded by a whitish to ochraceous, often clearly exserted ring of about 0.1 mm. The hamathecium does not have oil globules interspersed. Asci contain 8 ascospores each. Ascospores are hyaline, muriform, ellipsoid, measuring 60–66 by 12–16 μm, without a distinctly thickened median septum, with rounded ends, and not surrounded by a gelatinous layer. Pycnidia have not been observed in this species.

=== Similar species ===
Astrothelium graphicum is characterised by its extended, reticulate pseudostroma, lower than the slightly bullate thallus, and the orange pruina on both the thallus and pseudostroma, which gives it a resemblance to a giraffe's pattern. It is similar in aspect to A. flavomaculatum, which mainly differs by its much larger ascospores, measuring 140–200 by 25–30 μm.

== Chemistry ==
The thallus surface of Astrothelium graphicum reacts to UV light with a pink colour, and its medulla is K−. The pseudostroma surface also reacts to UV light with a pink colour, and the pigmented parts of the pseudostroma turn K+ (purple). Thin-layer chromatography, a technique used to identify chemical substances, reveals the presence of an anthraquinone, likely parietin.

== Habitat and distribution ==
This lichen grows on smooth bark of trees in rainforests. At the time of its original publication, it was known only from Brazil.

== See also ==
- List of lichens of Brazil
