= Astrothelium globosum =

Scientific classification
- Kingdom: Fungi
- Division: Ascomycota
- Class: Dothideomycetes
- Order: Trypetheliales
- Family: Trypetheliaceae
- Genus: Astrothelium
- Species: A. globosum

Binomial name
- Astrothelium globosum Aptroot & M.Cáceres (2016)

Species of lichen-forming fungus

Astrothelium globosum is a species of lichen in the family Trypetheliaceae. This species is characterised by its immersed ascomata (fruiting bodies) and a thallus consisting of nearly spherical warts, along with ascospores that contain three internal divisions.

== Taxonomy ==
Astrothelium globosum was formally described as a new species in 2016 by André Aptroot and Marcela Cáceres in the journal The Lichenologist . The type specimen was collected in Santa Luzia do Itanhi, Mata do Crasto, Brazil, on the bark of a tree, in March 2012.

== Description ==
The thallus of Astrothelium globosum is corticate, consisting of closely appressed, nearly spherical warts measuring 0.3–0.9 mm in diameter. These warts form a pale greyish-green cover over areas up to 3 cm in diameter and are approximately 0.9 mm thick. The thallus has a thick hyaline cortex and does not induce gall formation on the host bark. Ascomata are pyriform, measuring 0.2–0.4 mm in diameter, and usually appear in groups of 2–5, immersed in the bark and visible from above by black ostioles between the thallus warts. The ascomata wall is carbonised and up to 50 μm thick. Ostioles are eccentric and brown. The hamathecium is not inspersed, and ascospores are 8 per ascus, hyaline, 3-septate, long ellipsoid, 35–40 by 11–13 μm, with diamond-shaped lumina and surrounded by a gelatinous sheath. Pycnidia were not observed in this species.

This species is distinguished by a unique thallus consisting of almost spherical warts, an unusual three-dimensional feature for a crustose lichen. It is most closely related to Astrothelium simplex, which is differentiated by its longer ascospores.

== Chemistry ==
The thallus surface of Astrothelium globosum is UV−, and the thallus medulla is K−. Thin-layer chromatography, a technique used to identify chemical substances, tests revealed no secondary metabolites.

== Ecology and distribution ==
Astrothelium globosum is found on the smooth bark of trees in lowland Atlantic rainforest. At the time of its original publication, it was known to occur only in Brazil.

== See also ==
- List of lichens of Brazil
