= Astrothelium flavoduplex =

Scientific classification
- Kingdom: Fungi
- Division: Ascomycota
- Class: Dothideomycetes
- Order: Trypetheliales
- Family: Trypetheliaceae
- Genus: Astrothelium
- Species: A. flavoduplex

Binomial name
- Astrothelium flavoduplex Aptroot & M.Cáceres (2016)

Species of lichen-forming fungus

Astrothelium flavoduplex is a species of corticolous (bark-dwelling), crustose lichen in the family Trypetheliaceae. Found in Brazil, it was formally described as a new species in 2016 by the lichenologists André Aptroot and Marcela Cáceres. The type specimen was collected by the authors in the Parque Natural Municipal de Porto Velho (Porto Velho, Rondônia), where it was found growing on a twig in a low-altitude primary rainforest. The lichen has a smooth and somewhat shiny, olive-green thallus with a black prothallus line (about 0.3 mm wide) and covers areas of up to 8 cm (3.1 in) in diameter. The ascomata are more or less spherical (globose) and typically occur in groups of around 7 to 50, usually immersed in the bark tissue as pseudostromata. The thallus contains lichexanthone, a lichen product that causes the thallus surface to fluoresce yellow when lit with a long-wavelength UV light. The use of thin-layer chromatography on collected samples revealed the presence of an anthraquinone compound, possibly parietin. Astrothelium mesoduplex is similar in appearance, but that species lacks lichexanthone, and has shorter ascospores.

== See also ==
- List of lichens of Brazil
