= Astrothelium trematum =

Scientific classification
- Kingdom: Fungi
- Division: Ascomycota
- Class: Dothideomycetes
- Order: Trypetheliales
- Family: Trypetheliaceae
- Genus: Astrothelium
- Species: A. trematum

Binomial name
- Astrothelium trematum Kalb & Aptroot (2018)

Species of lichen

Astrothelium trematum is a species of corticolous (bark-dwelling), crustose lichen in the family Trypetheliaceae, first described in 2018. Found only in Brazil, it is characterised by its lack of lichexanthone and pigments, and distinctive ascospores.

== Taxonomy ==
Astrothelium trematum was formally described by lichenologists Klaus Kalb and André Aptroot in 2018. The type specimen was collected near Caraguatatuba, São Paulo, Brazil, in a plantation of Theobroma cacao. The specimen was collected by the first author on 9 March 1980. The specific epithet trematum refers to the distinct ring around the ostiole that separates the ostiole from the thallus.

== Description ==
The thallus of Astrothelium trematum is dull, up to 0.3 mm thick, and pale olivaceous green, with a thick cortex and a medulla containing hyaline crystals. It is not surrounded by a prothallus. Ascomata are spherical to pyriform, 0.6–0.9 mm in diameter, solitary in pseudostromatal warts. The pseudostroma is low hemispherical, almost completely covered by a thallus layer, about 1–1.5 mm in diameter, and without pigmentation. Ostioles are apical, consisting of exposed carbonized, black ascoma wall, about 0.2 mm wide, surrounded by a whitish ring of approximately 0.3 mm in diameter. The hamathecium is not inspersed. Ascospores number eight per ascus, and are hyaline with 5 to 7 septa, measuring 95–135 by 25–33 μm. They have a long ellipsoid shape with internal diamond-shaped lumina. Pycnidia were not observed.

The thallus of Astrothelium trematum is UV−, C−, K−, KC−, and P−. Thin-layer chromatography analysis did not detect any secondary metabolites.

== Habitat and distribution ==
Astrothelium trematum was found on tree bark in a cocoa plantation, and at the time of its original publication, was known only to occur in Brazil.
