= Astrothelium macrostomum =

Scientific classification
- Kingdom: Fungi
- Division: Ascomycota
- Class: Dothideomycetes
- Order: Trypetheliales
- Family: Trypetheliaceae
- Genus: Astrothelium
- Species: A. macrostomum

Binomial name
- Astrothelium macrostomum Aptroot (2016)

Species of lichen-forming fungus

Astrothelium macrostomum is a species of corticolous (bark-dwelling), crustose lichen in the family Trypetheliaceae. It is found in Brazil, Guyana, and Venezuela.

== Taxonomy ==
The species was formally described as new to science in 2016 by the Dutch lichenologist André Aptroot. The type collection was made by Harrie Sipman in Parque Natural do Caraça, Minas Gerais, Brazil, on September 16, 1997.

== Description ==
The thallus of Astrothelium macrostomum is corticate, smooth, somewhat shiny, and continuous, covering areas up to 7 cm in diameter and less than 0.1 mm thick. It appears olive-green to olive-grey, typically lacking a prothallus, and induces gall formation on the host bark, causing the lower bark or cambium layer to swell and erupt through the upper bark.

Ascomata are pyriform (pear-shaped), about 0.6–1.2 mm in diameter, usually aggregated in groups of 2–5, and mostly immersed in the bark tissue. The wall is carbonised, up to approximately 80 μm thick. Ostioles are eccentric and fused, with a flat, white-pruinose appearance, surrounded by a whitish zone. The hamathecium does not contain oil lobules. Asci each contain eight ascospores. These ascospores are hyaline, 5–7-septate, fusiform, measuring 65–85 by 16–19 μm, with pointed ends and diamond-shaped lumina, not surrounded by a gelatinous layer. Pycnidia were not observed to occur in this species.

== Chemistry ==
The thallus surface of Astrothelium macrostomum is UV−, while the medulla is K−. The ostiolar region has a UV+ (yellow) reaction. Thin-layer chromatography indicates the presence of lichexanthone, a xanthone compound that fluoresces when lit with a long-wavelength UV light.

== Similar species ==
Astrothelium macrostomum is similar to Astrothelium eustomum, but can be differentiated by its 5–7-septate ascospores, as opposed to the 3–5-septate and smaller ascospores of A. eustomum. Astrothelium diplocarpoides shares some similar characteristics, but differs in having an inspersed hamathecium and the presence of lichexanthone throughout the thallus.

== Habitat and distribution ==
Astrothelium macrostomum grows on the smooth bark of trees within rainforests. It is known to occur in Brazil, Guyana, and Venezuela.

== See also ==
- List of lichens of Brazil
