= Bogoriella collospora =

Scientific classification
- Kingdom: Fungi
- Division: Ascomycota
- Class: Dothideomycetes
- Order: Trypetheliales
- Family: Trypetheliaceae
- Genus: Bogoriella
- Species: B. collospora

Binomial name
- Bogoriella collospora (Vain.) Aptroot & Lücking (2016)

Synonyms
- Pyrenula collospora Vain. (1918); Melanotheca collospora (Vain.) Zahlbr. (1922); Mycomicrothelia collospora (Vain.) Aptroot (2009)

Species of lichen

Bogoriella collospora is a species of corticolous (bark-dwelling) crustose lichen in the family Trypetheliaceae. Found in Japan, this rare lichen forms dark olive-brown crusty patches on tree bark, though the crust is often so reduced it is barely visible to the naked eye. It can be identified by its clusters of small black fruiting bodies with side openings and its distinctive brown spores that are covered in fine granular ornamentation.

== Taxonomy ==
The species was originally described in 1918 by Edvard Vainio as Pyrenula collospora, based on material collected in Honshu, Japan, by Atsushi Yasuda. It was later transferred to Mycomicrothelia in 2009 by André Aptroot. In 2016, Aptroot and Robert Lücking placed it in the genus Bogoriella, giving the species its present name, Bogoriella collospora. The holotype specimen is housed in the Vainio collection at TUR (no. 31241), with an isotype (a duplicate) preserved at TNS.

== Description ==
Bogoriella collospora has a thallus that is dark olive-brown but often reduced to the point of being nearly invisible. Its reproductive bodies (ascomata) are black, typically grouped in clusters of 2–10, and feature side openings (lateral ostioles) that are often fused together. Each ascus contains eight ascospores that are brown, ellipsoid to club-shaped with rounded tips, and covered in a fine granular ornamentation. The spores are divided into three internal cross-walls (3-septate), measure 34–38 by 11–13 μm, and are enclosed in a clear gelatinous sheath, although their walls are not thickened. No asexual reproductive structures (pycnidia) have been observed. Standard chemical spot tests (UV, K) are negative, and thin-layer chromatography has not detected any secondary metabolites.

== Distribution ==
Bogoriella collospora is only known to occur in Honshu, Japan.
