= Bogoriella obovata =

Scientific classification
- Kingdom: Fungi
- Division: Ascomycota
- Class: Dothideomycetes
- Order: Trypetheliales
- Family: Trypetheliaceae
- Genus: Bogoriella
- Species: B. obovata

Binomial name
- Bogoriella obovata (Stirt.) Aptroot & Lücking (2016)

Synonyms
- Verrucaria obovata Stirt. (1881); Pyrenula obovata (Stirt.) Shirley (1890); Microthelia obovata (Stirt.) Müll.Arg. (1895); Mycomicrothelia obovata (Stirt.) D.Hawksw. (1985); Microthelia brisbanensis Müll.Arg. (1895); Microthelia alba Müll.Arg. (1895)

Species of lichen

Bogoriella obovata is a species of corticolous (bark-dwelling) crustose lichen in the family Trypetheliaceae. This tropical lichen forms pinkish-white crusty patches marked by distinct dark border lines on various surfaces and produces solitary, small dark fruiting bodies. It has a broad distribution across the eastern tropical regions, being found from Australia and New Guinea through Southeast Asia to Borneo and the Philippines.

== Taxonomy ==
Bogoriella obovata was originally described in 1881 by James Stirton as Verrucaria obovata, based on material collected in Brisbane, Queensland, Australia. It was subsequently placed in Pyrenula by John Francis Shirley in 1890, transferred to Microthelia by Johannes Müller Argoviensis in 1895, and later moved to Mycomicrothelia by David Hawksworth in 1985. In 2016, André Aptroot and Robert Lücking transferred the species to the genus Bogoriella, giving it its current name. The holotype is housed in the herbarium of the Natural History Museum, London (BM).

Several other names are now considered synonyms of this species. Microthelia alba and Microthelia brisbanensis, both described by Müller Argoviensis in 1895 from Brisbane, are based on material housed in Geneva (G). Two additional names, Didymosphaeria tetraspora (described by George Massee in 1907 from Sarawak, Malaysia, with the holotype at Kew) and Didymosphaeria thelenoides (described by Edvard Vainio in 1915 from Dominica, with a lectotype designated by Aptroot in 1995 and preserved in TUR-Vain), are likewise treated as synonyms of Bogoriella obovata.

== Description ==
Bogoriella obovata has a pinkish-white thallus that is marked by distinct prothallus border lines. Its fruiting bodies (ascomata) are solitary, 0.5–0.6 mm in diameter and 0.2–0.3 mm tall, with walls 45–60 micrometres (μm) thick. The asci are 75–90 by 20–30 μm (occasionally as small as 65 μm long). The spores are brown, warty in texture, and usually divided into two compartments, with the upper cell slightly larger. They measure 22–28 μm long (sometimes ranging from 21 to 30 μm) and 9–11 μm wide (occasionally 8.5–12 μm). Although primarily 1-septate, the spores often develop two additional pseudosepta, making them appear 3-septate. No pycnidia have been observed. Standard chemical spot tests (UV and K) are negative, and thin-layer chromatography has not revealed any detectable secondary metabolites.

== Distribution ==
Bogoriella obovata occurs in the eastern Palaeotropics, with records from Borneo, the Philippines, Papua New Guinea, and Australia.
