= Astrothelium sanguineoxanthum =

Scientific classification
- Kingdom: Fungi
- Division: Ascomycota
- Class: Dothideomycetes
- Order: Trypetheliales
- Family: Trypetheliaceae
- Genus: Astrothelium
- Species: A. sanguineoxanthum

Binomial name
- Astrothelium sanguineoxanthum Aptroot (2016)

Species of lichen

Astrothelium sanguineoxanthum is a species of corticolous (bark-dwelling), crustose lichen in the family Trypetheliaceae. Found in Brazil, it was formally described as a new species in 2016 by Dutch lichenologist André Aptroot. The type specimen was collected in 1894 by Swedish botanist Gustaf Oskar Andersson Malme in Santa Anna da Chapada (Mato Grosso); there, it was found in a rainforest growing on smooth tree bark. The lichen has a smooth, green to greyish thallus with whitish pseudostromata that range in shape from rounded to irregular to elongated. The thallus contains the lichen products isohypocrellin and lichexanthone; the latter substance causes the thallus and pseudostroma to fluoresce yellow when lit with a long-wavelength UV light, while the pigment isohypocrellin causes a K+ (green) chemical spot test reaction. The combination of characteristics of the lichen that distinguish it from others in Astrothelium are its ascospores, which turn violet in iodine potassium iodide (IKI) stain; and the arrangement and form of its ascomata, which are solitary to irregularly confluent, erumpent to prominent, and are whitish around the ostioles.
