= Bogoriella megaspora =

Scientific classification
- Kingdom: Fungi
- Division: Ascomycota
- Class: Dothideomycetes
- Order: Trypetheliales
- Family: Trypetheliaceae
- Genus: Bogoriella
- Species: B. megaspora

Binomial name
- Bogoriella megaspora (Aptroot & M.Cáceres) Aptroot & Lücking (2016)
- Holotype: Cuniã Ecological Station, Brazil

Synonyms
- Mycomicrothelia megaspora Aptroot & M.Cáceres (2013)

Species of lichen

Bogoriella megaspora is a species of corticolous (bark-dwelling) crustose lichen in the family Trypetheliaceae. This tropical lichen forms pinkish to whitish grey crusty patches bordered by distinctive black lines on tree bark in Brazilian rainforests. It is distinguished from all related species by having the largest single-septum spores in its genus group, with brown, club-shaped spores that are often enclosed in a thick gelatinous sheath.

== Taxonomy ==
Bogoriella megaspora was first described in 2014 by André Aptroot and Marcela Cáceres as Mycomicrothelia megaspora. The type specimen was collected in Brazil, in the state of Rondônia, at the Cuniã Ecological Station. It was found at around 100 m elevation near kilometer 760 of the BR 319 highway, northeast of Porto Velho. The lichen was growing on tree bark in primary rainforest and was gathered on 20 November 2012 by Cáceres and Aptroot. In 2016, Aptroot and Robert Lücking transferred the species to the genus Bogoriella, giving it its current name. The holotype is housed in the herbarium of the Instituto de Sistemática e Ecologia (ISE), with an isotype (duplicate) preserved in ABL.

== Description ==
Bogoriella megaspora has a thallus that ranges from pinkish to whitish grey, with a surface that can be smooth or slightly uneven. It is bordered by a distinct black prothallus line. The fruiting bodies (ascomata) are solitary, 0.5–0.9 mm in diameter, and appear erumpent to prominently raised. They are conical in shape, black, and exposed, each with an apical opening. Inside, the hamathecium is clear and hyaline.

Each ascus contains eight ascospores. The spores are brown, club-shaped, and typically divided by a single internal cross-wall (1-septate), often constricted at the septum. They measure 27–40 by 8–12 μm and are frequently enclosed in a gelatinous sheath 6–15 μm thick. This species has the largest single-septum ascospores of all of the lichens now classified in Bogoriella, Distothelia, and Novomicrothelia. No asexual reproductive structures (pycnidia) have been observed. Standard chemical spot tests (UV and K) are negative, and thin-layer chromatography has revealed no detectable lichen substances.

== Distribution ==
Bogoriella megaspora occurs on smooth bark in primary forest Brazil, where it is locally common.
