= Bogoriella conothelena =

Scientific classification
- Kingdom: Fungi
- Division: Ascomycota
- Class: Dothideomycetes
- Order: Trypetheliales
- Family: Trypetheliaceae
- Genus: Bogoriella
- Species: B. conothelena

Binomial name
- Bogoriella conothelena (Nyl.) Aptroot & Lücking (2016)

Synonyms
- Verrucaria conothelena Nyl. (1873); Microthelia conothelena (Nyl.) Zahlbr. (1921); Mycomicrothelia conothelena (Nyl.) D.Hawksw. (1985)

Species of lichen

Bogoriella conothelena is a species of corticolous (bark-dwelling) crustose lichen in the family Trypetheliaceae. This tropical lichen forms pale brown crusty patches bordered by distinctive dark prothallus lines and produces solitary, small dark fruiting bodies on the surface. It has been recorded from the Andaman Island and Sri Lanka.

== Taxonomy ==
The species was first described in 1873 by William Nylander as Verrucaria conothelena, based on material from the Andaman Islands in India. It was later transferred to Microthelia by Alexander Zahlbruckner in 1921, and then to Mycomicrothelia by David Hawksworth in 1985. In 2016, André Aptroot and Robert Lücking placed it in the genus Bogoriella, where it is now recognised as Bogoriella conothelena. The lectotype, designated by Hawksworth, is preserved in Nylander's herbarium (H-Nyl 704).

Nylander also described a variety, Verrucaria conothelena var. errans, from the Andaman Islands. This taxon was later transferred to Microthelia by Zahlbruckner, and its holotype (H-Nyl 710) is likewise housed in Nylander's herbarium.

== Description ==
Bogoriella conothelena has a pale brown thallus that is bordered by distinct dark prothallus lines. Its fruiting bodies (ascomata) are solitary, each about 0.4 mm in diameter and 0.20–0.25 mm tall, with a wall 30–50 μm thick, reaching up to 70 μm near the base. The asci are 80–100 by 10–20 μm. Ascospores are golden brown, warty in texture, and divided into two compartments, with the upper cell larger. They measure 19–23 μm long (sometimes up to 27 μm) and 9–11 μm wide (occasionally as narrow as 7.5 μm or as broad as 12 μm), and have rounded ends. No pycnidia have been observed. Standard chemical spot tests (UV and K) are negative, and thin-layer chromatography has not revealed any secondary metabolites.

== Distribution ==
Bogoriella conothelena has an eastern palaeotropical distribution, and has been reported from the palaeotropical Islands and from Sri Lanka.
