= Astrothelium xanthosordithecium =

Scientific classification
- Kingdom: Fungi
- Division: Ascomycota
- Class: Dothideomycetes
- Order: Trypetheliales
- Family: Trypetheliaceae
- Genus: Astrothelium
- Species: A. xanthosordithecium

Binomial name
- Astrothelium xanthosordithecium Aptroot (2022)
- Holotype: Santuário do Caraça, Brazil

Species of lichen

Astrothelium xanthosordithecium is a species of corticolous (bark-dwelling, crustose lichen in the family Trypetheliaceae. The lichen grows in the rainforests of Minas Gerais, Brazil. It contains the chemical lichexanthone, a secondary metabolite that causes it to fluoresce when lit with an ultraviolet light.

== Taxonomy ==
The Dutch lichenologist André Aptroot formally described Astrothelium xanthosordithecium in 2022, highlighting its unique chemical composition compared to its closest relative, Astrothelium sordithecium. The species epithet xanthosordithecium alludes to its distinctive feature: the presence of lichexanthone, a yellow pigment, contrasting with the brownish hamathecium (a tissue in the ascomata containing spore-producing cells) inspersion of A. sordithecium. The type specimen was collected from the Santuário do Caraça in Minas Gerais, at an elevation between 1,200 and 1,400 m (3,900 and 4,600 ft).

== Description ==
The thallus of Astrothelium xanthosordithecium is slightly shiny and olivaceous green, spreading up to 110 cm (43 in) in diameter and about 0.1 mm thick. It closely follows the substrate without forming a prothallus, an initial growth phase or border seen in other lichens. Reproductive structures (ascomata) are pear-shaped and fused, forming within pseudostromata, a tissue structure that houses multiple ascomata. These pseudostromata are often whitish, round to lobate, and can be 1–3 mm in diameter and 0.9–1.4 mm high. Each pseudostromatum typically has a single group of fused ascomata, thus a single ostiole (opening), which is black and eccentric (off-centre).

The internal tissue, or hamathecium, contains tiny brownish oil globules. The lichen produces eight spores per ascus, which are clear (hyaline), dividided into four compartments by septa (3-septate), and measure 34–37 by 10–12 μm. These spores are long-ellipsoid in shape and do not have a surrounding gelatinous sheath. No pycnidia (structures for asexual reproduction) were observed.

Chemically, both the thallus and pseudostromata show a yellow fluorescence under ultraviolet light. Thin-layer chromatography confirmed the presence of lichexanthone, a secondary metabolite that contributes to the lichen's unique characteristics.

=== Similar species ===
Astrothelium xanthosordithecium is closely related to Astrothelium sordithecium, sharing the habitat and the brownish hamathecium inspersion. However, it is distinguishable by its chemical composition, specifically the presence of lichexanthone, which sets it apart from any other species within Astrothelium.
