= Bogoriella macrocarpa =

Scientific classification
- Kingdom: Fungi
- Division: Ascomycota
- Class: Dothideomycetes
- Order: Trypetheliales
- Family: Trypetheliaceae
- Genus: Bogoriella
- Species: B. macrocarpa

Binomial name
- Bogoriella macrocarpa (Komposch, Aptroot & Hafellner) Aptroot & Lücking (2016)

Synonyms
- Mycomicrothelia macrocarpa Komposch, Aptroot & Hafellner (2002)

Species of lichen

Bogoriella macrocarpa is a species of corticolous (bark-dwelling) crustose lichen in the family Trypetheliaceae. It occurs in Venezuela.

== Taxonomy ==
Bogoriella macrocarpa was first described in 2002 by Harald Komposch, André Aptroot, and Josef Hafellner as Mycomicrothelia macrocarpa, based on material collected in the Alto Orinoco region of Amazonas, Venezuela. In 2016, Aptroot and Robert Lücking transferred the species to the genus Bogoriella, where it is now recognised as Bogoriella macrocarpa. An isotype (duplicate) specimen is preserved in the herbarium of Graz (GZU).

== Description ==
Bogoriella macrocarpa has a creamy white thallus marked by dark prothallus lines. Its fruiting bodies (ascomata) are solitary, 0.7–1.1 mm in diameter and 0.3–0.4 mm tall, each with a broad fringe and an apical opening. Within the ascomata, the hamathecium contains oil droplets, which are concentrated in the center and along the margins. The asci are 140–190 by 20–24 μm. The ascospores are olive-brown, warty in texture, and divided into two compartments, with the upper cell slightly larger. They measure about 30–45 by 10–15 μm and have rounded ends.

Asexual reproductive structures (pycnidia) are present, 75–125 μm across. These produce colorless, rod-shaped conidia that are slightly thickened near the middle. The conidia are typically 15–21 μm long (sometimes up to 26 μm), about 0.4 μm wide, and reach 0.8 μm at the swollen portion.

In chemical tests, the thallus is UV+ (yellow), indicating the presence of lichexanthone, but it reacts negatively with K.

== Distribution ==
Bogoriella macrocarpa is a Neotropical species, so far reported only from Venezuela.
