= Astrothelium unisporum =

Scientific classification
- Kingdom: Fungi
- Division: Ascomycota
- Class: Dothideomycetes
- Order: Trypetheliales
- Family: Trypetheliaceae
- Genus: Astrothelium
- Species: A. unisporum

Binomial name
- Astrothelium unisporum Aptroot & M.Cáceres (2016)
- Holotype: Ramal do Rio Preto, Brazil

Species of lichen

Astrothelium unisporum is a species of corticolous (bark-dwelling) crustose lichen in the family Trypetheliaceae. This lichen was discovered in the Brazilian Amazon, where it grows on tree bark in savanna areas. It is one of only two known species in its large family that produces just one spore per spore-containing structure, rather than the typical eight spores.

== Taxonomy ==
Astrothelium unisporum was described as new to science in 2016 by André Aptroot and Marcela da Silva Cáceres from material collected in Amapá, northern Brazil. The holotype was gathered on tree bark in savanna vegetation near the Maracá Extractive Reserve (municipality of Mazagão, Amapá). The specific epithet refers to its unusual asci that contain a single ascospore, a rare condition in this family. Within the family Trypetheliaceae it is one of only two species known with one spore per ascus; the other, Astrothelium nicaraguense, has larger spores.

== Description ==
The thallus of A. unisporum is slightly shiny and ochraceous, with a thick, cartilaginous (cartilage-like) cortex. It lacks a distinct prothallus and does not induce gall formation of the host bark. Ascomata are more or less spherical (globose), 0.8–1.2 mm in diameter, superficially visible but embedded in high wart-like pseudostromata that are prominent, unpigmented internally, and entirely covered by the thallus. Ostioles are apical, brown, usually set in a small depression, and encircled by a 0.2–0.4 mm whitish ring. The hamathecium is not inspersed (IKI−). Asci contain a single spore; the spores are hyaline, regularly muriform, ellipsoid, and large (125–148 × 35–42 μm), without a distinctly thickened median septum. Pycnidia were not observed. All spot test reactions on the thallus are negative; thin-layer chromatography detected no lichen substances.

== Habitat and distribution ==
The species grows on tree bark in savanna vegetation. It is known only from Brazil, where it has been documented from both Amapá and Pará.
