= Astrothelium decemseptatum =

Scientific classification
- Kingdom: Fungi
- Division: Ascomycota
- Class: Dothideomycetes
- Order: Trypetheliales
- Family: Trypetheliaceae
- Genus: Astrothelium
- Species: A. decemseptatum

Binomial name
- Astrothelium decemseptatum Aptroot & M.Cáceres (2016)

Species of lichen-forming fungus

Astrothelium decemseptatum is a species of corticolous (bark-dwelling), crustose lichen in the family Trypetheliaceae. Found in Brazil, it was formally described as a new species in 2016 by lichenologists André Aptroot and Marcela Cáceres. The type specimen was collected by the authors in the Sítio Ecológico Buriti on Lago Cujubim (northeast of Porto Velho, Rondônia), in a disturbed rainforest. The lichen has a smooth and somewhat shiny, pale yellowish-grey thallus that lacks a prothallus and covers areas of up to 7 cm (2.8 in) in diameter. The ascomata are pear-shaped (pyriform) and typically occur in aggregated groups of two to five, usually immersed in the bark tissue. The species epithet decemseptatum refers to the ascospores, which usually have between nine and eleven septa that divide the spore into distinct compartments. Anthraquinone compounds were detected in collected samples of the lichen using thin-layer chromatography. The characteristics that distinguish it from other members of Astrothelium include its ascomata, which are solitary to irregularly confluent, immersed in large thallus verrucae, and have scattered, external, pink pigment, and an inspersed hamathecium; and the dimensions of the ascospores (50–65 by 10–17 μm).

== See also ==
- List of lichens of Brazil
