= Bogoriella triangularis =

Scientific classification
- Kingdom: Fungi
- Division: Ascomycota
- Class: Dothideomycetes
- Order: Trypetheliales
- Family: Trypetheliaceae
- Genus: Bogoriella
- Species: B. triangularis

Binomial name
- Bogoriella triangularis (Aptroot) Aptroot & Lücking (2016)

Synonyms
- Mycomicrothelia triangularis Aptroot (2005)

Species of lichen

Bogoriella triangularis is a species of corticolous (bark-dwelling) crustose lichen in the family Trypetheliaceae. This Caribbean lichen forms whitish crusty patches marked by dark border lines on smooth tree bark and is distinguished by its uniquely shaped fruiting bodies that are oval to triangular rather than round like most related species. It is known only from Puerto Rico, where it was discovered in the Maricao State Forest, making it an endemic species of the island.

== Taxonomy ==
Bogoriella triangularis was first described in 2005 by André Aptroot as Mycomicrothelia triangularis, based on material collected in Puerto Rico at the Maricao State Forest, north of Sabana Grande. In 2016, Aptroot and Robert Lücking transferred the species to the genus Bogoriella, giving it its current name. The holotype specimen is preserved in the Berlin herbarium (B).

== Description ==
Bogoriella triangularis has a whitish thallus marked by dark prothallus lines. Its fruiting bodies (ascomata) are solitary and typically oval to triangular in shape, with a prominent fringe and an apical opening; they measure 0.4–0.5 mm across and about 0.2 mm tall, and often include a lateral ostiole. The asci are about 120 by 15 micrometres (μm).

The ascospores are brown, with rounded ends and a warty surface, sometimes with the warts arranged in lines. They are 25–37 μm long and 7–10 μm wide, and are divided into two compartments that are usually equal, though the upper cell may be slightly larger. Asexual reproductive structures (pycnidia) occur along the prothallus lines, about 0.1 mm wide, but the conidia have not been observed. Both the thallus and ascomata test negative in standard chemical spot tests (UV and K), and thin-layer chromatography has not revealed any secondary metabolites.

== Distribution ==
Bogoriella triangularis occurs in Puerto Rico, where it grows on smooth bark.
