= Astrothelium miniannulare =

Scientific classification
- Kingdom: Fungi
- Division: Ascomycota
- Class: Dothideomycetes
- Order: Trypetheliales
- Family: Trypetheliaceae
- Genus: Astrothelium
- Species: A. miniannulare

Binomial name
- Astrothelium miniannulare Kalb & Aptroot (2018)

Species of lichen-forming fungus

Astrothelium miniannulare is a species of crustose lichen in the family Trypetheliaceae, characterized by its corticolous (bark-dwelling) habitat and presence of lichexanthone. Characteristics of the lichen include the whitish ring around its ostiole and the presence of three septa (internal partitions) in the ascospores.

== Taxonomy ==
The species was described in 2018 by lichenologists Klaus Kalb and André Aptroot. The type specimen was collected in 1980 by the first author from the Mantiqueira Mountains, Rio de Janeiro, at an altitude of 1,850 m (6,070 ft). The specific epithet miniannulare reflects its membership in the annulare-group of genus Astrothelium and its small ascospores.

== Description ==
Astrothelium miniannulare features a dull, pale olivaceous-green thallus up to 0.3 mm thick, with a thick cortex and medulla containing hyaline (translucent) crystals. The ascomata are spherical to pyriform, measuring 0.6–0.8 mm in diameter. The pseudostroma is hemispherical, about 1 mm in diameter, and lacks pigmentation. Ostioles are apical, protruding, brown, and surrounded by a distinctive whitish ring. Ascospores number eight per ascus, and measure 45–60 by 19.5–22.5 μm. They have a long ellipsoidal shape and diamond-shaped internal lumina.

The thallus of Astrothelium miniannulare has a UV+ (yellow) reaction. Standard chemical spot tests are negative (C−, K−, KC−, P−). Thin-layer chromatography reveals the presence of lichexanthone, a lichen product responsible for the UV+ reaction.

== Habitat and distribution ==
This species is corticolous, meaning it grows on tree bark, and has been observed in marsh forests. At the time of publication, it was known only to occur in its type locality in Brazil.

== See also ==
- List of lichens of Brazil
