= Astrothelium septemseptatum =

Scientific classification
- Kingdom: Fungi
- Division: Ascomycota
- Class: Dothideomycetes
- Order: Trypetheliales
- Family: Trypetheliaceae
- Genus: Astrothelium
- Species: A. septemseptatum

Binomial name
- Astrothelium septemseptatum Aptroot (2016)

Species of lichen

Astrothelium septemseptatum is a species of corticolous (bark-dwelling), crustose lichen in the family Trypetheliaceae. Formally described as a new species in 2016 by Dutch lichenologist André Aptroot, it is found in Guyana and Venezuela, where it grows on trees in savanna and rainforest. The type specimen was collected by Harrie Sipman about 3 km (1.9 miles) south of Kuyuwini Landing (Upper Takutu-Upper Essequibo) at an altitude of 230 m (750 ft); there, it was found growing on smooth tree bark. The lichen has a smooth and somewhat shiny, pale yellowish-grey thallus with a cortex and a thin (0.5 mm wide) black prothallus line. It covers areas of up to 9 cm (3.5 in) in diameter. The presence of the lichen does not induce the formation of galls in its host plant. Both the thallus and the pseudostroma contain lichexanthone, a lichen product that causes these structures to fluoresce yellow when lit with a long-wavelength UV light. The combination of characteristics of the lichen that distinguish it from others in Astrothelium are the presence of lichexanthone in thallus and ascomata, and the ascospores, which are divided by from 7 to 9 septa and have dimensions of 50–55 by 12–17 μm.
