= Astrothelium lucidomedullatum =

Scientific classification
- Kingdom: Fungi
- Division: Ascomycota
- Class: Dothideomycetes
- Order: Trypetheliales
- Family: Trypetheliaceae
- Genus: Astrothelium
- Species: A. lucidomedullatum

Binomial name
- Astrothelium lucidomedullatum Aptroot (2016)

Species of lichen

Astrothelium lucidomedullatum is a species of corticolous (bark-dwelling), crustose lichen in the family Trypetheliaceae. Found in Ecuador, it was formally described as a new species in 2016 by Dutch lichenologist André Aptroot. The type specimen was collected by Harrie Sipman from the Reserva Biológica San Francisco (Cordillera Numbala, Zamora-Chinchipe) at an altitude of 2,025 m (6,644 ft); there, it was found in a rainforest growing on smooth bark. The lichen has a quite smooth and shiny, pale ochraceous-green thallus with a cortex but lacking a prothallus, covering areas of up to 5 cm (2 in) in diameter. The medulla contains lichexanthone, a lichen product that causes its tissue to fluoresce when lit with a long-wavelength UV light. The main characteristics of the lichen distinguishing it from others in Astrothelium are its ascospores, which number four per ascus and have dimensions of 80–115 by 25–35 μm; the presence of lichexanthone in the medulla; and the structure of the immersed ascomata, which have separate ostioles and are covered by the thallus.
