= Astrothelium octoseptatum =

Scientific classification
- Kingdom: Fungi
- Division: Ascomycota
- Class: Dothideomycetes
- Order: Trypetheliales
- Family: Trypetheliaceae
- Genus: Astrothelium
- Species: A. octoseptatum

Binomial name
- Astrothelium octoseptatum Aptroot & M.Cáceres (2016)

Species of lichen-forming fungus

Astrothelium octoseptatum is a species of corticolous (bark-dwelling) lichen in the family Trypetheliaceae. Found in Brazil, it was formally described as a new species in 2016 by André Aptroot and Marcela Cáceres. The type specimen was collected by the authors in the Parque Natural Municipal de Porto Velho (Porto Velho, Rondônia), in a low-altitude rainforest. The lichen has a smooth and somewhat shiny, pale greenish-grey thallus that lacks a prothallus and covers areas of up to 7 cm (2.8 in) in diameter. The ascomata are pear-shaped (pyriform) and typically occur in groups of two to five, usually immersed in the bark tissue. The lichen contains lichexanthone, a substance that causes the surface of the pseudostroma to glow yellow when lit with a high-wavelength UV light. The species epithet octoseptatum refers to the ascospores, which usually have eight septa that divide the spore into distinct compartments.

== See also ==
- List of lichens of Brazil
