= Pseudobogoriella =

Scientific classification
- Kingdom: Fungi
- Division: Ascomycota
- Class: Dothideomycetes
- Order: Trypetheliales
- Family: Trypetheliaceae
- Genus: Pseudobogoriella; Lücking, R.Miranda & Aptroot (2020)

Type species
- Pseudobogoriella hemisphaerica (Müll.Arg.) Lücking, R.Miranda & Aptroot (2020)

Genus of lichens

Pseudobogoriella is a genus of lichen-forming fungi in the family Trypetheliaceae. It includes 16 species. The genus was created for species formerly placed in Mycomicrothelia (broad sense) and later in Bogoriella after DNA-based studies showed they form a separate branch in the phylogenetic tree. The type species is Pseudobogoriella hemisphaerica. Members of the genus have very small ascospores—the sexual spores of the fungus—divided once (two-celled) and lacking extra thickening on the inner spore wall; together with the molecular evidence, this feature sets them apart from Bogoriella.

== Taxonomy ==
The genus was established based on DNA studies that showed species formerly placed in Mycomicrothelia (broadly defined) actually belong to three separate evolutionary lineages. One of these corresponds to Bogoriella, whereas the remaining taxa form two closely related clades that emerge basally in the phylogeny. Because only a subset of species has been sequenced, the authors adopted a conservative course and merged those two clades into a single, currently paraphyletic genus, Pseudobogoriella. This recognises that these species cannot be placed in Bogoriella s.s. for topological reasons but that further sampling will be needed to resolve relationships more finely.

In making the genus, numerous new combinations were effected from Mycomicrothelia/Bogoriella into Pseudobogoriella, including P. alata, P. annonacea, P. captiosa, P. exigua, P. fumosula, P. hemisphaerica, P. lateralis, P. leuckertii, P. minutula, P. nonensis, P. pachnea, P. punctata, P. socialis, P. striguloides, and P. subfallens. One taxon, P. striguloides, is exceptional in the genus because it is foliicolous with a Strigula-like, subcuticular thallus; its ascus and ascoma anatomy resemble the lichenicolous genus Polycoccum, a group recently shown to be close to Trypetheliaceae. The describing authors therefore cautioned that P. striguloides may not be a genuine member of Trypetheliaceae, but they deferred formal changes pending broader study.

== Description ==
Thalli of Pseudobogoriella species are crustose (forming a thin crust on the substrate), most often corticolous on bark; in the exceptional P. striguloides the thallus is foliicolous (on living leaves) and lies beneath the cuticle (subcuticular), with distinct lobes. The sexual fruiting bodies are perithecia—flask-shaped ascomata that open by a minute pore (the ostiole). In most species the ostiole is apical; it is lateral in P. lateralis. Perithecia are small, typically about 0.2–0.5 mm in diameter, and may occur solitary or aggregated. An involucrellum (a dark, often thickened cap or sheath around the upper portion of the perithecium) is usually present and can be narrowly to broadly expanded at the base, sometimes forming a conspicuous fringe; this basal expansion is an important character among species. The fruit-wall (excipulum) is usually unpigmented, but in P. leuckertii it contains a red, K+ (potassium hydroxide)-soluble pigment that dissolves in K.

Ascospores are diagnostic for the genus: they are small, one-septate (divided by a single cross-wall), and lack endospore thickenings. Length ranges used in the key include about 12–16 micrometres (μm), 16–22 μm, and up to 24–28 μm in the type species P. hemisphaerica; widths are mostly 4–9 μm, with shape ratios and absolute size helping to separate similar species. A black prothallus line (a dark marginal line around the thallus) may be present and in some species is accompanied by numerous pycnidia—minute asexual fruiting bodies that appear as black dots—either concentrated along the prothallus (e.g. P. punctata) or scattered over the thallus surface (e.g. P. socialis, P. fumosula). The combination of perithecial position and shape, involucrellum development, reaction of perithecial tissues to K, presence or absence of a black prothallus and pycnidia, and ascospore dimensions provides practical characters for identification.

== Habitat and distribution ==
Most species are bark-dwelling (corticolous) in forested habitats, where they develop thin crusts bearing small perithecia; at least one species (P. striguloides) occurs on living leaves with a subcuticular thallus. Records from a range of regions (including Europe and Asia), and the group likely spans tropical to warm-temperate zones. A fuller picture of distribution and ecology is expected as additional species are sequenced and revised within the framework that led to the segregation of Pseudobogoriella.

== Species ==
As of September 2025, Species Fungorum (in the Catalogue of Life) accepts 16 species of Pseudobogoriella:

- Pseudobogoriella alata (Groenh. ex Aptroot) Lücking, R.Miranda & Aptroot (2020)
- Pseudobogoriella annonacea (Müll.Arg.) Lücking, R.Miranda & Aptroot (2020)
- Pseudobogoriella captiosa (Kremp.) Lücking, R.Miranda & Aptroot (2020)
- Pseudobogoriella exigua (Müll.Arg.) Lücking, R.Miranda & Aptroot (2020)
- Pseudobogoriella fumosula (Zahlbr.) Lücking, R.Miranda & Aptroot (2020)
- Pseudobogoriella hemisphaerica (Müll.Arg.) Lücking, R.Miranda & Aptroot (2020)
- Pseudobogoriella lateralis (Sipman) Lücking, R.Miranda & Aptroot (2020)
- Pseudobogoriella leuckertii (D.Hawksw. & J.C.David) Lücking, R.Miranda & Aptroot (2020)
- Pseudobogoriella miculiformis (Müll.Arg.) Lücking, R.Miranda & Aptroot (2021)
- Pseudobogoriella minutula (Zahlbr.) Lücking, R.Miranda & Aptroot (2020)
- Pseudobogoriella nonensis (Stirt.) Lücking, R.Miranda & Aptroot (2020)
- Pseudobogoriella pachnea (Körb.) Lücking, R.Miranda & Aptroot (2020)
- Pseudobogoriella punctata (Aptroot) Lücking, R.Miranda & Aptroot (2020)
- Pseudobogoriella socialis (Zahlbr.) Lücking, R.Miranda & Aptroot (2020)
- Pseudobogoriella striguloides (Sérus. & Aptroot) Lücking, R.Miranda & Aptroot (2020)
- Pseudobogoriella subfallens (Müll.Arg.) Lücking, R.Miranda & Aptroot (2020)
