= Astrothelium megochroleucum =

Scientific classification
- Kingdom: Fungi
- Division: Ascomycota
- Class: Dothideomycetes
- Order: Trypetheliales
- Family: Trypetheliaceae
- Genus: Astrothelium
- Species: A. megochroleucum

Binomial name
- Astrothelium megochroleucum Aptroot (2016)

Species of lichen

Astrothelium megochroleucum is a species of corticolous (bark-dwelling), crustose lichen in the family Trypetheliaceae. Found in El Salvador, it was formally described as a new species in 2016 by Dutch lichenologist André Aptroot. The type specimen was collected by Harrie Sipman in the El Imposible National Park (Ahuachapán) at an altitude of 1,300 m (4,300 ft); there, it was found in a coffee plantation growing on the smooth tree bark of Leucaena trichandra.

The lichen has a smooth and somewhat shiny, ochraceous thallus with a cortex and a thin (about 0.1 mm wide) black prothallus line. It covers areas of up to 4 cm (1.6 in) in diameter. The presence of the lichen induces the formation of galls in the host plant; as a consequence, the bark underneath the thallus splits open and forms a callus. Both the thallus and the pseudostroma contain lichexanthone, a lichen product that causes these structures to fluoresce yellow when lit with a long-wavelength UV light. The combination of characteristics of the lichen that distinguish it from others in Astrothelium are its prominent, whitish, pseudostromatic ascomata, and the dimensions of its ascospores (60–70 by 16–18 μm). These spores have three septa, a character that separates it from the otherwise similar Astrothelium ochroleucoides.
