= Astrothelium disjunctum =

Scientific classification
- Kingdom: Fungi
- Division: Ascomycota
- Class: Dothideomycetes
- Order: Trypetheliales
- Family: Trypetheliaceae
- Genus: Astrothelium
- Species: A. disjunctum

Binomial name
- Astrothelium disjunctum Aptroot & M.Cáceres (2016)

Species of lichen-forming fungus

Astrothelium disjunctum is a species of corticolous (bark-dwelling), crustose lichen in the family Trypetheliaceae. Found in Brazil, it was formally described as a new species in 2016 by the lichenologists André Aptroot and Marcela Cáceres. The type specimen was collected by the authors in the Parque Natural Municipal de Porto Velho (Porto Velho, Rondônia), in a low-altitude rainforest. The lichen has a smooth and somewhat shiny, pale yellowish-grey thallus that has a black prothallus line (about 0.3 mm wide) and covers areas of up to 5 cm (2 in) in diameter. The ascomata are roughly spherical (globose) and typically occur in groups of 5 to 25, usually immersed in the bark tissue as pseudostromata. The characteristic that largely distinguishes it from other members of Astrothelium are its smooth to coarsely uneven thallus. Astrothelium disjunctum is somewhat similar to A. bicolor, but that species has smaller ascospores.

== See also ==
- List of lichens of Brazil
