= Macroconstrictolumina =

Scientific classification
- Kingdom: Fungi
- Division: Ascomycota
- Class: Dothideomycetes
- Order: Trypetheliales
- Family: Trypetheliaceae
- Genus: Macroconstrictolumina; Lücking, R.Miranda & Aptroot (2020)

Type species
- Macroconstrictolumina malaccitula (Nyl.) Lücking, R.Miranda & Aptroot (2020)

Species
- M. lyrata M. majuscula M. malaccitula M. megalateralis

Genus of lichens

Macroconstrictolumina is a genus of lichen-forming fungi in the family Trypetheliaceae. It has four species.

== Taxonomy ==
The genus was circumscribed in 2020 by lichenologists Robert Lücking, Ricardo Miranda-González, and André Aptroot. The genus name refers to its large ascospores. Three of the four species were previously in the genus Constrictolumina. Macroconstrictolumina is a sister taxon to Bogoriella, and all three genera are in the family Trypetheliaceae.

== Description ==
The thallus, which is the vegetative body of the lichen, is typically whitish and lacks a cortex. It forms a symbiotic relationship with the green algae Trentepohlia, which serves as its photobiont.

The ascomata, or spore-producing structures, of these fungi are usually singular but can sometimes be found in clusters. They are slightly raised or prominently emerging from the thallus, featuring a carbonised, hard outer layer. The opening of the ascomata, known as the ostiole, is typically at the top but occasionally found on the side. The involucrellum, a protective layer surrounding the ascomata, is also carbonised.

The excipulum, which is the outer tissue layer of the ascomata, is made up of tightly interwoven cells, appearing brownish to colourless beneath the surface. The hamathecium, which is the tissue filling the cavity of the ascomata, consists of very thin, hyaline (transparent), branched, and interconnecting filaments called pseudoparaphyses, all set in a gel-like substance.

The asci, or spore-bearing cells, are club-shaped, short-stalked, and open via a fissitunicate mechanism, meaning they have a double wall that splits to release spores. Each ascus typically contains two to eight spores and features a non-staining ocular chamber at its tip.

The ascospores are spindle-shaped to ellipsoid, colourless, and have one to three cross-walls (septa) with occasional secondary constrictions in each cell. They often have a granular surface texture, are slightly pinched at the septa, and surrounded by a gel-like sheath. The spores are medium-sized, generally measuring 30–50 μm in length and 10–16 (sometimes up to 24) μm in width. However, in one species, M. lyrata, the spores are somewhat smaller. The reproductive structures known as pycnidia have not been observed in this genus. Chemical analysis using thin-layer chromatography has not detected any lichen products in these species.

== Habitat and distribution ==
Macroconstrictolumina consists of lichen-forming fungi that predominantly inhabit terrestrial, lowland to lower montane tropical regions, often growing on bark.

== Species ==
- Macroconstrictolumina lyrata (R.C.Harris) Lücking, R.Miranda & Aptroot (2020) – Florida
- Macroconstrictolumina majuscula (Nyl.) Lücking, R.Miranda & Aptroot (2020)
- Macroconstrictolumina malaccitula (Nyl.) Lücking, R.Miranda & Aptroot (2020)
- Macroconstrictolumina megalateralis Aptroot (2020) – Brazil
