= Astrothelium eumultiseptatum =

Scientific classification
- Kingdom: Fungi
- Division: Ascomycota
- Class: Dothideomycetes
- Order: Trypetheliales
- Family: Trypetheliaceae
- Genus: Astrothelium
- Species: A. eumultiseptatum

Binomial name
- Astrothelium eumultiseptatum Aptroot & M.Cáceres (2016)

Species of lichen-forming fungus

Astrothelium eumultiseptatum is a species of corticolous (bark-dwelling), crustose lichen in the family Trypetheliaceae. Found in Brazil, it was formally described as a new species in 2016 by lichenologists André Aptroot and Marcela Cáceres. The type specimen was collected by the authors in the Fazenda São Francisco (north of Porto Velho, Rondônia), in a low-altitude primary rainforest. The lichen has a smooth and somewhat shiny, pale yellowish-grey thallus with a black prothallus line (about 0.3 mm wide) and covers areas of up to 7 cm (2.8 in) in diameter. The ascomata are pear-shaped (pyriform) and typically aggregate in groups of two to five, usually immersed in the bark tissue as pseudostromata. The ostioles of the ascomata contains lichexanthone, a lichen product that causes these structures to glow yellow when lit with a long-wavelength UV light. The main characteristic that distinguishes it from other members of Astrothelium are its ascospores, which measure 65–70 by 15–17 μm, and only have transverse septa.

== See also ==
- List of lichens of Brazil
