= Astrothelium mesoduplex =

Scientific classification
- Kingdom: Fungi
- Division: Ascomycota
- Class: Dothideomycetes
- Order: Trypetheliales
- Family: Trypetheliaceae
- Genus: Astrothelium
- Species: A. mesoduplex

Binomial name
- Astrothelium mesoduplex Aptroot & M.Cáceres (2016)

Species of lichen-forming fungus

Astrothelium mesoduplex is a species of lichen in the family Trypetheliaceae. It is similar to A. flavoduplex but has larger ascospores and lacks lichexanthone. This lichen species has been found only in Brazil, particularly in primary forests.

== Taxonomy ==
Astrothelium mesoduplex was formally described as a new species in 2016 by lichenologists André Aptroot and Marcela Cáceres. The type specimen was collected by the authors in the Parque Natural Municipal de Porto Velho (Porto Velho, Rondônia), where it was found growing on a twig in a primary rainforest.

== Description ==
The thallus of Astrothelium mesoduplex is corticate, smooth, somewhat shiny, and continuous, with an olive-green colour. It covers areas up to 8 cm (3.1 in) in diameter and is approximately 0.1 mm thick. The thallus is surrounded by a black prothallus line about 0.2 mm wide and does not induce gall formation on the host bark. The ascomata are spherical, 0.4–0.6 mm in diameter, and immersed in groups of about 3–50 in pseudostromata. The pseudostromata have a surface different from the thallus, raised about 1 mm above the thallus, and are oval to irregular in outline, up to 3 mm wide. They are yellow to orange in colour, with a pale yellow interior. The wall of the ascomata is dark brown all around, and measures up to 40 μm thick. The ostioles are apical, not fused, flat to convex, and brown. The hamathecium is not inspersed with oil globules. The asci contain 8 ascospores, which are hyaline, muriform with about 22–30 transverse septa, fusiform to clavate, 90–100 by 20–23 μm in size, with rounded ends and angular lumina with mostly oblique septa.

== Habitat and distribution ==
Astrothelium mesoduplex is found on smooth bark of trees in primary forests and is currently known only from Brazil. It has been observed in Porto Velho, Rondônia, at the Parque Natural Municipal de Porto Velho, and Fazenda São Francisco, north of Porto Velho.

== See also ==
- List of lichens of Brazil
