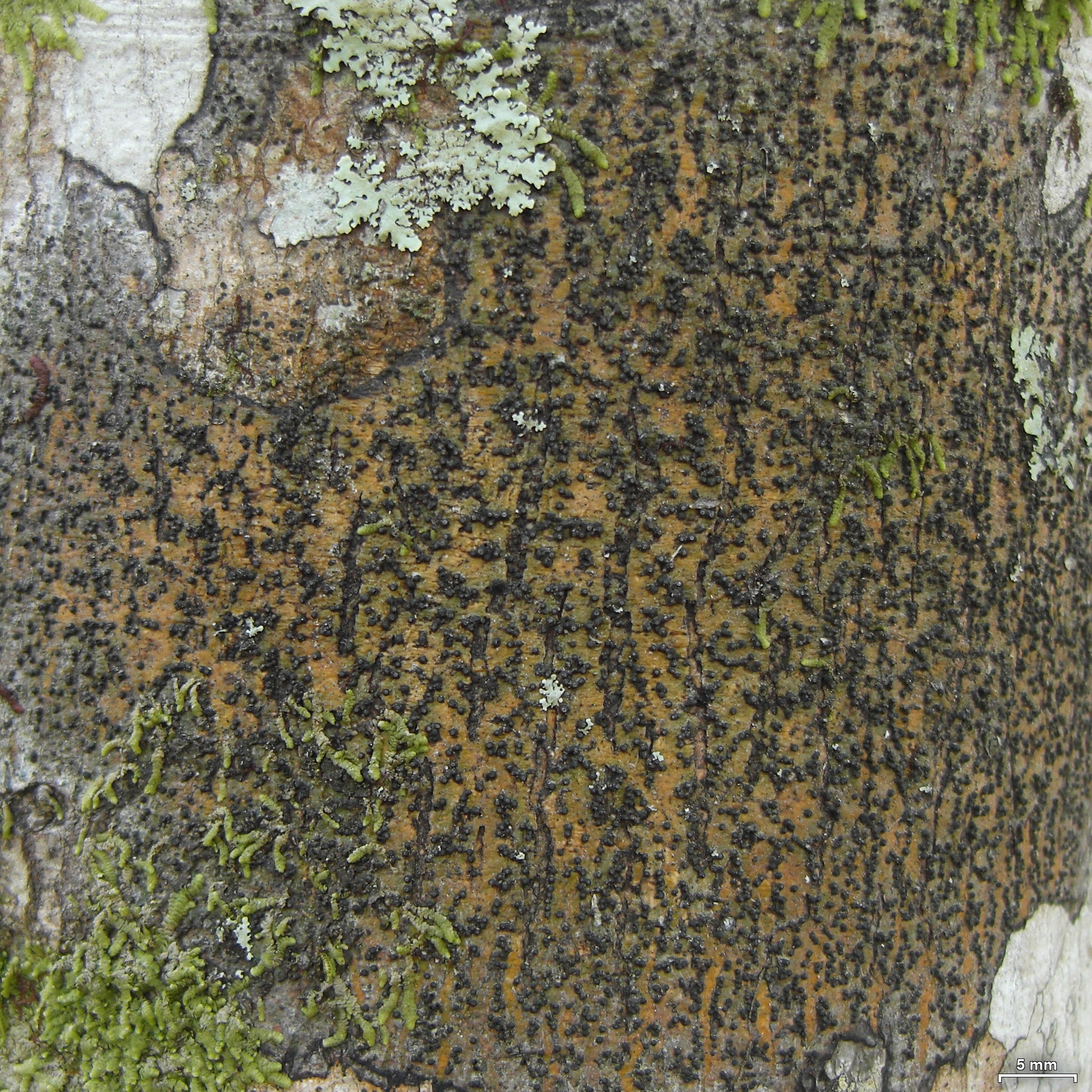
- Nigrovothelium tropicum

Scientific classification
- Kingdom: Fungi
- Division: Ascomycota
- Class: Dothideomycetes
- Order: Trypetheliales
- Family: Trypetheliaceae
- Genus: Nigrovothelium; Lücking, M.P.Nelsen & Aptroot (2016)

Type species
- Nigrovothelium tropicum (Ach.) Lücking, M.P.Nelsen & Aptroot (2016)

Species
- N. bullatum N. inspersotropicum N. tropicum

= Nigrovothelium =

Genus of lichens

Nigrovothelium is a genus of lichen-forming fungi in the family Trypetheliaceae. It comprises three species. These lichens form crusty patches with a protective outer layer and are easily recognised by their small, black, egg-shaped fruiting bodies that sit directly on the surface. The spores inside have a distinctive diamond-shaped internal cavities that helps distinguish this genus from similar lichens.

== Taxonomy ==
The genus was circumscribed in 2016 by the lichenologists Robert Lücking, Matthew Nelsen, and André Aptroot, to contain species formerly in the Trypethelium tropicum species group. The type species, Nigrovothelium tropicum, was originally described by Erik Acharius in 1810, as a species of Verrucaria.

The genus can be characterised by its differences from other similar Trypetheliaceae genera. It differs from Astrothelium in that it has ascomata that are black, fully exposed, and sessile. It differs from Bathelium in its mostly single, black ascomata and astrothelioid ascospores. It differs from Polymeridium in its corticate thallus and astrothelioid ascospores.

== Description ==
Nigrovothelium forms a crust-like thallus on the substrate with a distinct outer cortex, so the surface looks and feels more consolidated than in non-corticate crusts. The sexual fruiting bodies are usually produced singly, but they can grow so close together that they crowd and merge along their sides. Each fruiting body is small, black, egg-shaped, and sits directly on the thallus without a stalk (sessile); they are fully exposed rather than sunk into a surrounding tissue (i.e. not in pseudostromata). A minute pore at the top (an apical ostiole) serves as the spore exit.

Inside, the jelly-like matrix (hamathecium) is clear and colourless (hyaline) and contains very thin, branching threads (paraphysoids) that frequently connect to each other (anastomose) and are often dotted with oil droplets. The spore sacs (asci) are club-shaped. The ascospores are colourless and divided by three cross-walls (transversely 3-septate). A characteristic feature is the astrothelioid spore architecture: the inner spore wall (endospore) thickens so that the internal cavities (lumina) take on a diamond-shaped outline. This combination—corticate crust, solitary black, fully exposed fruiting bodies, and astrothelioid spores—captures the diagnostic appearance of the genus.

== Species ==
- Nigrovothelium bullatum Lücking, Upreti & Lumbsch (2016)
- Nigrovothelium inspersotropicum Aptroot & Diederich (2017)
- Nigrovothelium tropicum (Ach.) Lücking, M.P.Nelsen & Aptroot (2016)
