= Aptrootia =

Scientific classification
- Domain: Eukaryota
- Kingdom: Fungi
- Division: Ascomycota
- Class: Dothideomycetes
- Order: Trypetheliales
- Family: Trypetheliaceae
- Genus: Aptrootia; Lücking & Sipman (2007)

Type species
- Aptrootia terricola (Aptroot) Lücking, Umaña & Chaves (2007)

Species
- A. elatior A. khaoyaiensis A. robusta A. terricola

Genus of fungi

Aptrootia is a genus of fungi in the family Trypetheliaceae. It has four species. The genus was circumscribed by Robert Lücking and Harrie Sipman in 2007, with Aptrootia terricola assigned as the type species. This species, originally described by Dutch mycologist André Aptroot as a species of Thelenella, is known from Papua New Guinea and Costa Rica. Later molecular work showed that the species did not belong in Thelenella (Aptroot himself had expressed doubt about this generic placement), but rather, in the Trypetheliaceae, with a sister taxon relationship to a branch including Bathelium and a lineage containing Trypethelium floridanum. The new genus name honours Aptroot, "in recognition of his numerous contributions to tropical lichenology".

Species in genus Aptrootia have completely immersed perithecia with a brown-black ostiolar region. This is surrounded by a white, cartilaginous thallus reminiscent of those in family Gomphillaceae.

== Species ==
- Aptrootia elatior (Stirt.) Aptroot (2009) – Australia
- Aptrootia khaoyaiensis Polyiam & Lücking (2024) – Thailand
- Aptrootia robusta (P.M.McCarthy & Kantvilas) Aptroot (2009) – Australia
- Aptrootia terricola (Aptroot) Lücking, L.Umaña & Chaves (2007) – Papua New Guinea; Costa Rica
