= Astrothelium simplex =

Scientific classification
- Kingdom: Fungi
- Division: Ascomycota
- Class: Dothideomycetes
- Order: Trypetheliales
- Family: Trypetheliaceae
- Genus: Astrothelium
- Species: A. simplex

Binomial name
- Astrothelium simplex Aptroot & S.M.A.Martins (2016)

Species of lichen

Astrothelium simplex is a species of corticolous (bark-dwelling), crustose lichen in the family Trypetheliaceae, first described in 2016. It is found in the Atlantic Forest of Brazil.

== Taxonomy ==
Astrothelium simplex was formally described as a new species by the lichenologists André Aptroot and Suzana Maria de Azevedo Martins in 2016. The type specimen was collected by the second author in Caraá, Rio Grande do Sul, Brazil, on 27 April 2009.

== Description ==
The thallus of Astrothelium simplex is corticate, bullate, somewhat shiny, and continuous, covering areas up to 7 cm in diameter and approximately 0.3 mm thick. The thallus is olive-green in colour and does not have a prothallus, but it does induce gall formation on the host bark. The ascomata are pyriform (pear-shaped), measuring about 0.6–0.9 mm in diameter, typically aggregated in groups of 2–5, and mostly immersed in the bark tissue. The wall is carbonised and up to 80 μm thick. Ostioles are eccentric, fused, raised, and dark brown, and surrounded by an ochraceous zone. The hamathecium does not contain oil globules. Asci contain eight ascospores each. Ascospores are hyaline, 3-septate, fusiform, measuring 56–63 by 15–19 μm, with pointed ends and diamond-shaped lumina, and lack a gelatinous sheath. Pycnidia were not observed.

== Chemistry ==
The thallus surface of Astrothelium simplex is UV−, and the medulla does not react to potassium hydroxide (K−). Thin-layer chromatography analysis detected no secondary metabolites in this lichen.

== Habitat and distribution ==
This species is found on the smooth bark of trees in the Atlantic Forest and at the time of its original publication was known to occur only in Brazil.
