= Polypyrenula =

Scientific classification
- Kingdom: Fungi
- Division: Ascomycota
- Class: Dothideomycetes
- Order: Trypetheliales
- Family: Trypetheliaceae
- Genus: Polypyrenula; D.Hawksw. (1985)
- Species: P. sexlocularis

Binomial name
- Polypyrenula sexlocularis (Müll.Arg.) D.Hawksw. (1985)

Synonyms
- Microthelia sexlocularis Müll.Arg. (1888); Polythelis sexlocularis (Müll. Arg.) Clem. (1909); Polypyrenula albissima Aptroot (1991)

Single-species fungal genus

Polypyrenula is a fungal genus in the family Trypetheliaceae, containing the single species Polypyrenula sexlocularis. It is a small, inconspicuous fungus that grows beneath the outer layer of tree bark in tropical regions, primarily in seasonally dry forests. The genus is characterized by its unique spore structure that features a combination of septum types not found in related fungi. First described from a specimen collected in the 1820s from Caribbean medicinal bark, Polypyrenula was long considered potentially extinct and was incorrectly classified in a different fungal family. Scientific collections gathered from Mexico, Bolivia, and the Caribbean have shown that the fungus is more widespread than previously thought. Molecular studies published in 2020 conclusively established its proper taxonomic placement among the early diverging lineages of the Trypetheliaceae. The fungus sometimes forms a symbiotic relationship with green algae, making it a "facultative lichen".

== Taxonomy ==
The genus has a complex taxonomic history, having been previously classified in the family Pyrenulaceae based on morphological features. However, molecular analysis using nuclear large subunit rDNA (nuLSU) and mitochondrial small subunit rDNA (mtSSU) markers, published in 2020, conclusively placed it within Trypetheliaceae as part of the early diverging lineages in this family.

The genus was established by David L. Hawksworth in 1985 as a replacement name for Polythelis Clements (1909), which was an illegitimate homonym of a rust fungus genus. For nearly two centuries, P. sexlocularis was known primarily from a type collection gathered by Antoine Laurent Apollinaire Fée around 1825 from medicinal bark of Croton eluteria (cascarilla) brought to Europe from the Caribbean. This taxonomic placement remained uncertain until molecular evidence confirmed its proper classification.

== Description ==
Polypyrenula sexlocularis is characterized by its thin, whitish-grey to brownish thallus (fungal body) that grows beneath the surface layer of tree bark. It is facultatively lichenized, meaning it sometimes forms a symbiotic relationship with Trentepohlia algae, though the algal partner is not always present.

The fungus produces small, black, perithecioid ascomata (flask-shaped fruiting bodies) that emerge from the substrate, measuring 0.20–0.35 mm wide. What distinguishes this genus from others is its unique ascospore structure: each spore has a pronounced basal euseptum (a true septum formed from the septal plate) followed by 3–5 distosepta (septa formed from the endospore without a septal plate). This unusual combination of septum types is not found in other members of the Trypetheliaceae.

The hamathecium (the sterile tissue between the asci) consists of branched and anastomosing pseudoparaphyses embedded in a gelatinous matrix, a feature that aligns with Dothideomycetes rather than Eurotiomycetes, supporting its placement in Trypetheliaceae.

== Habitat and distribution ==
Once thought to be potentially extinct and restricted to the Caribbean, Polypyrenula sexlocularis is now known to be more widespread in the Neotropics. Recent collections have documented its presence in Mexico along the Pacific coast, in Bolivia, and in the Caribbean, suggesting the species was previously overlooked due to its inconspicuous appearance. The species shows an association with seasonally dry tropical forests, ecosystems characterized by deciduous trees, extended dry seasons of three to eight months, annual precipitation of 400–2000 mm, and mean annual temperatures above 25°C. These habitats occur throughout the Neotropics, with significant areas in Mexico, Bolivia, the West Indies, and parts of Brazil.

Polypyrenula sexlocularis appears to have limited phorophyte (host tree) specificity, having been found on various tree species including Apoplanesia paniculata, Caesalpinia caladenia, Gliricidia sepium, Heliocarpus pallidus, and Leucaena lanceolata. The species occurs primarily at elevations below 340 metres, although one Bolivian specimen was collected at 1500 metrers elevation. The fungus appears to be adaptable to disturbed habitats, with six out of seven Mexican specimens collected from secondary forests rather than mature forest stands, suggesting it may be resilient to some forms of habitat modification.
