= Bogoriella =

Scientific classification
- Kingdom: Fungi
- Division: Ascomycota
- Class: Dothideomycetes
- Order: Trypetheliales
- Family: Trypetheliaceae
- Genus: Bogoriella; Zahlbr. (1928)

Type species
- Bogoriella subpersicina Zahlbr. (1928)

Species
- See text

Synonyms
- Bogoriellomyces Cif. & Tomas. (1954); Distothelia Aptroot (2005); Novomicrothelia Aptroot, M.P.Nelsen & Lücking (2016)

Genus of lichens

Bogoriella is a genus of crustose lichens in the family Trypetheliaceae.

== Taxonomy ==
The genus was circumscribed by Alexander Zahlbruckner in 1928, with Bogoriella subpersicina assigned as the type species. Subsequent work showed that Bogoriella has nomenclatural priority over Mycomicrothelia, so the species formerly placed in Mycomicrothelia were transferred to Bogoriella. Hongsanan and colleagues later treated Zahlbruckner's type, B. subpersicina, as a synonym of Bogoriella decipiens, and confirmed the genus as part of the family Trypetheliaceae.

Using an expanded molecular dataset (principally mitochondrial small-subunit ribosomal DNA) together with morphology, Hongsanan and colleagues showed that the tropical taxa previously distributed between Bogoriella and Novomicrothelia form several distinct lineages. To stabilise usage, they merged Novomicrothelia into Bogoriella (i.e. Novomicrothelia sensu lato nested within Bogoriella), and also brought the type species of Ornatopyrenis and Distothelia into Bogoriella as generic synonyms. In practical terms this means Ornatopyrenis queenslandica and Distothelia isthmospora are now treated within Bogoriella. One species formerly in Distothelia (D. angulata) was excluded and placed in the separate genus Schummia based on its contrasting ascospore morphology.

Their analyses further indicated that the broader "Bogoriella group" is heterogeneous: a basal, paraphyletic grade (retained conservatively as the separate genus Pseudobogoriella) and a more distant clade corresponding to Bogoriella sensu stricto (in the narrow sense). Because only a minority of species then had sequence data, the authors used morphology-based "binning" to infer placements for unsampled taxa. They showed that ascospore features traditionally used to separate genera—such as whether spores are muriform (divided into many internal chambers), 1-septate, or have thickened distosepta rather than true septa—do not align neatly with the phylogeny. On that basis they treated Bogoriella (in its revised sense) as encompassing 18 morphologically defined species, with four species represented by sequence data at the time.

== Species ==
As of September 2025, Species Fungorum (in the Catalogue of Life) accepts 22 species of Bogoriella:

- Bogoriella apposita (Nyl.) Aptroot & Lücking (2016)
- Bogoriella chiquitana (Flakus, Kukwa & Aptroot) Lücking, R.Miranda & Aptroot (2020)
- Bogoriella collospora (Vain.) Aptroot & Lücking (2016)
- Bogoriella complexoluminata Aptroot & Lücking (2020)
- Bogoriella confluens (Müll.Arg.) Aptroot & Lücking (2016)
- Bogoriella conothelena (Nyl.) Aptroot & Lücking (2016)
- Bogoriella decipiens (Müll. Arg.) Aptroot & Lücking (2016)
- Bogoriella isthmospora (Aptroot) Lücking, R.Miranda & Aptroot (2020)
- Bogoriella macrocarpa (Komposch, Aptroot & Hafellner) Aptroot & Lücking (2016)
- Bogoriella megaspora (Aptroot & M.Cáceres) Aptroot & Lücking (2016)
- Bogoriella modesta (Müll.Arg.) Aptroot & Lücking (2016)
- Bogoriella obovata (Stirt.) Aptroot & Lücking (2016)
- Bogoriella oleosa (Aptroot) Aptroot & Schumm (2021)
- Bogoriella pachytheca (Sacc., Syd. & P.Syd.) Aptroot & Lücking (2016)
- Bogoriella pandanicola (S.N.Zhang & K.D.Hyde) S.N.Zhang, Lücking & Aptroot (2020)
- Bogoriella queenslandica (Müll.Arg.) Aptroot & Lücking (2016)
- Bogoriella rubrostoma (Aptroot) Lücking, R.Miranda & Aptroot (2020)
- Bogoriella subpersicina Zahlbr. (1928)
- Bogoriella thelena (Ach.) Aptroot & Lücking (2016)
- Bogoriella triangularis (Aptroot) Aptroot & Lücking (2016)
- Bogoriella xantholateralis Aptroot (2021)
- Bogoriella xanthonica (Komposch, Aptroot & Hafellner) Aptroot & Lücking (2016)
