= Pantropical =

Something that encompasses/covers all tropical regions

A pantropical ("all tropics") distribution is one which covers tropical regions of both the Eastern and Western Hemispheres. Examples include caecilians, modern sirenians and the plant genera Acacia and Bacopa.

Neotropical is a zoogeographic term that covers a large part of the Americas, roughly from Mexico and the Caribbean southwards (including cold regions in southernmost South America).

Palaeotropical refers to geographical occurrence. For a distribution to be palaeotropical a taxon must occur in tropical regions in the Old World.

According to Takhtajan (1978), the following plant families have a pantropical distribution: Annonaceae, Hernandiaceae, Lauraceae, Piperaceae, Urticaceae, Dilleniaceae, Tetrameristaceae, Passifloraceae, Bombacaceae, Euphorbiaceae, Rhizophoraceae, Myrtaceae, Anacardiaceae, Sapindaceae, Malpighiaceae, Proteaceae, Bignoniaceae, Orchidaceae, and Arecaceae.

== See also ==
- Afrotropical realm
- Tropical Africa
- Tropical Asia
