= Mycomicrothelia =

Scientific classification
- Kingdom: Fungi
- Division: Ascomycota
- Class: Dothideomycetes
- Order: Trypetheliales
- Family: Trypetheliaceae
- Genus: Mycomicrothelia; Keissl. (1936)

Type species
- Mycomicrothelia macularis (Hampe ex A.Massal.) Keissl. (1936)

Synonyms
- Ornatopyrenis Aptroot (1991)

Genus of fungi

Mycomicrothelia is a genus of lichen-forming fungi in the family Trypetheliaceae.

== Species ==
As of September 2025, Species Fungorum (in the Catalogue of Life) accept eight species of Mycomicrothelia:

- Mycomicrothelia atlantica D.Hawksw. & Coppins (1985)
- Mycomicrothelia confusa D.Hawksw. (1985)
- Mycomicrothelia inaequalis (Fabre) D.Hawksw. (1981)
- Mycomicrothelia lojkae (Rehm) You Z.Wang, Aptroot & K.D.Hyde (2004)
- Mycomicrothelia macularis (Hampe ex A.Massal.) Keissl. (1936)
- Mycomicrothelia melanospora (Hepp) D.Hawksw. (1982)
- Mycomicrothelia palmicola J.Fröhl. & K.D.Hyde (2000)
- Mycomicrothelia wallrothii (Hepp) D.Hawksw. (1980)
