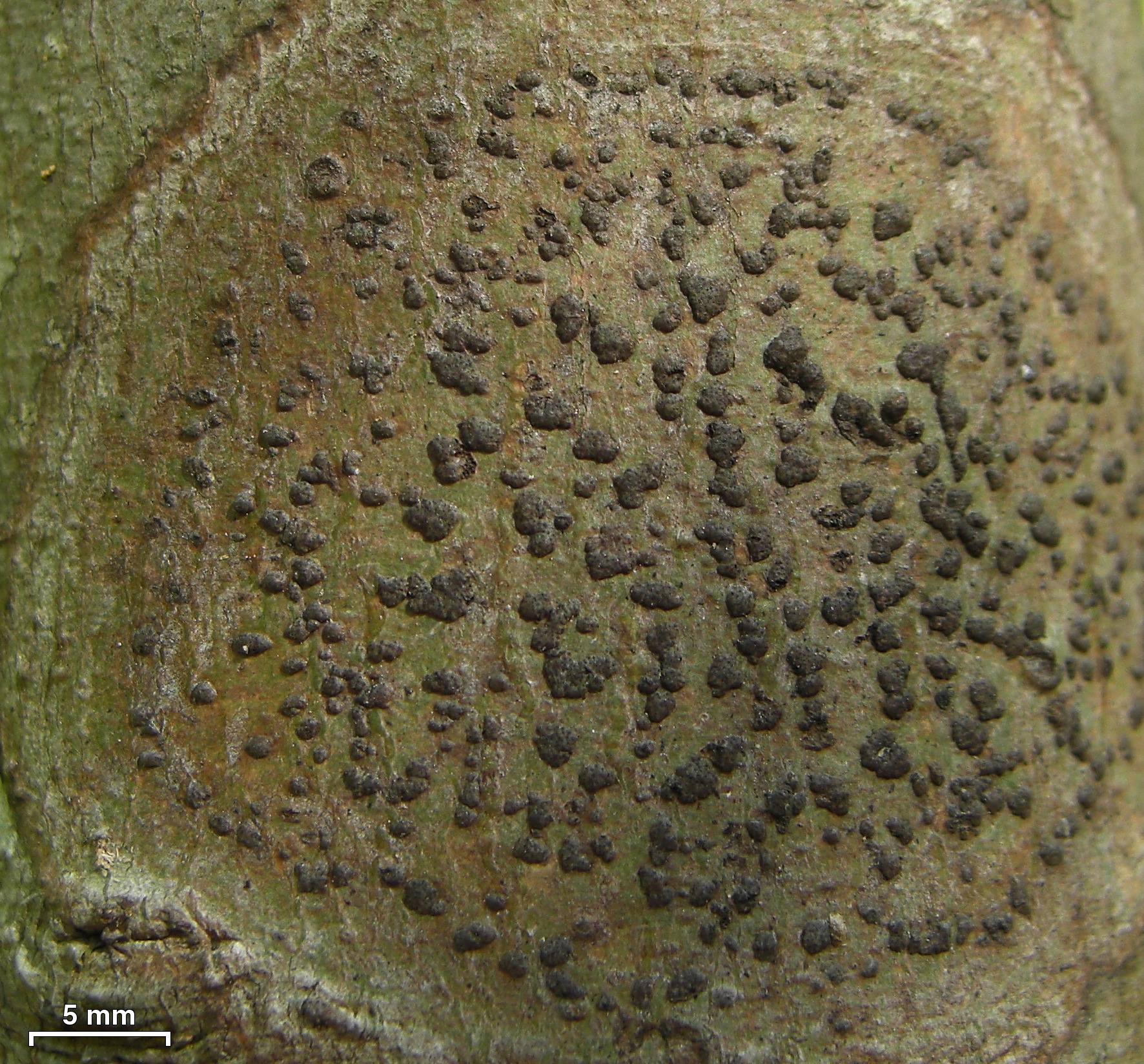
- Bathelium carolinianum

Scientific classification
- Kingdom: Fungi
- Division: Ascomycota
- Class: Dothideomycetes
- Order: Trypetheliales
- Family: Trypetheliaceae; Eschw. (1824)

Type genus
- Trypethelium Spreng. (1804)

Synonyms
- Arthopyreniaceae Walt.Watson (1929); Astrotheliaceae Zahlbr. (1898); Cryptotheliaceae Walt.Watson (1929); Hyalophragmiaceae Räsänen (1943); Laureraceae Vězda ex Poelt (1974)

= Trypetheliaceae =

Family of mainly lichen-forming fungi

The Trypetheliaceae are a family of mainly lichen-forming fungi in the order Trypetheliales. The family consists almost exclusively of corticolous (bark-dwelling), crustose lichens with an almost strictly tropical distribution.

== Taxonomy ==
Trypetheliaceae was circumscribed by German botanist Franz Gerhard Eschweiler in 1824. His diagnosis of the family was as follows (translated from Latin):"Thallus is crust-like. Apothecia are of varied shape, immersed in warts formed from the thallus's medullary substance." Eschweiler further notes that the family is almost exclusively found within the tropics. In his initial circumscription, he included the following genera: Arthonia, Porothelium, Medusula, Ophthalmidium, Trypethelium, Astrothelium, Glyphis, Chiodecton, and Conioloma.

In a set of formal nomenclatural proposals, Hawksworth and Eriksson (1988) recommended conserving the family name Arthopyreniaceae and rejecting Xanthopyreniaceae on grounds of prevailing usage and because Xanthopyrenia had long been treated as a synonym. They portrayed Arthopyreniaceae as mostly bark-dwelling, often lichen-forming pyrenomycetes, then understood to include roughly six genera and 400+ species; this move aimed to keep a widely used family name stable (proposal 895).

The family Arthopyreniaceae was placed into synonymy with Trypetheliaceae, and its type genus, Arthopyrenia, was transferred to Trypetheliaceae in 2021. Other synonyms of Trypetheliaceae include Astrotheliaceae, Cryptotheliaceae, Hyalophragmiaceae, and Laureraceae. The order Trypetheliales was proposed in 2008 to contain the family.

In their 2016 revisionary synopsis of the Trypetheliaceae, André Aptroot and Robert Lücking accepted 418 species, distributed amongst 15 genera. In 2020, Miranda-González and colleagues provided molecular evidence to include the monospecific genus Polypyrenula within Trypetheliaceae as one of its early diverging lineages, having previously been classified in Pyrenulaceae based solely on morphological features. A study of ascospore ontogeny in several Trypetheliaceae concluded that relying on mature ascospore morphology alone can be misleading for classification, because different spore types share developmental steps and similar mature forms may have evolved repeatedly within the family.

== Description ==
The general features of the Trypetheliaceae include a thallus that is mostly crustose, though the growth form of some species are squamulose to foliose or even fruticose. The family displays a diverse array of appearances, ranging from clearly visible and areolate to evanescent, hidden under bark, or even barely discernible from the substrate. The growth habit and development of the thallus surface are influenced by a combination of environmental conditions and evolutionary factors.

The internal anatomy of the ascomata, including the pseudostromata, in this family is still an emerging area of research with potential taxonomic and systematic implications. One noteworthy aspect is that the ascomata in Trypetheliaceae can develop either superficially or emerge from beneath the periderm, with some species even exhibiting both forms. This divergence is seen in species such as Architrypethelium grande, Astrothelium megaspermum, and others. The wall of the ascoma is typically multi-layered and may contain a medullary layer. In some species, like Astrothelium megaspermum, an additional brownish 'medullary' layer is present. The anatomy of the ascoma provides an array of characters that are used in the development of genus and species concepts within Trypetheliaceae.

Another consistent feature in most Trypetheliaceae is the hamathecium, comprising thin, branching paraphyses that form a network within a gelatinous matrix. However, the density and presence of the gelatinous matrix can vary across lineages. One feature, the hymenial inspersion, consists of oil droplets or infusions lining the paraphyses. The inspersion can be localized or spread throughout the hamathecium, and its taxonomic importance is still being uncovered.

The asci of Trypetheliaceae are typically fissitunicate, a structure best observed in species with larger ascospores. Additionally, ascospore type is a significant character in this family. While septation has historically been a key differentiator, recent understandings emphasize the nature of the septa and walls as more critical taxonomic indicators. The ascospores themselves can vary considerably, from the typical astrothelioid type to those that are multiseptate or muriform, and this variation offers insights into the relationships within the family. In megalosporous members of the family that have been studied in detail, ascospore development begins with thin-walled, colourless spores that first form a single central euseptum; later transverse septa develop as distosepta, producing the diamond-shaped lumina typical of the astrothelioid ascospore type. Even species that end up with dark, muriform spores pass through an astrothelioid stage during development, which suggests that mature ascospore types can be more closely related than their final appearance implies.

== Chemistry ==
The Trypetheliaceae family's chemical profile is less intricate than some tropical crustose families like Graphidaceae. The family's secondary substances primarily encompass xanthones and pigments, predominantly anthraquinones.

=== Xanthones ===
Lichexanthone is the most abundant xanthone, fluorescing a yellow hue under UV light, primarily on parts like the ascomata and thallus. Its presence, once a point of contention in taxonomy, is now considered species-specific due to phylogenetic studies. Another notable xanthone, coronatone, is less prevalent, showing an UV+ (orange) reaction.

=== Pigments ===
Anthraquinones dominate the pigments in the Trypetheliaceae, manifesting in various parts of the lichen. Among these, parietin (also known as physcione) stands out as a yellow-orange substance. It is especially prevalent in species such as Astrothelium aeneum and Marcelaria cumingii, and has a purple reaction when tested with a K chemical spot test. Similarly, teloschistin, another yellow pigment present in Marcelaria benguelensis, also reveals a purple reaction to K. Xanthorin, on the other hand, offers a vibrant red hue and can be identified in Marcelaria purpurina, reacting purple with K+. While these are the more commonly noted pigments, there are several others like skyrin and emodin that appear in lesser quantities. The taxonomic significance of these lesser-found pigments, however, remains a subject of ongoing research.

== Habitat, distribution, and ecology ==
Trypetheliaceae species, primarily found in tropical regions, are predominantly epiphytic, meaning these lichens mainly grow on other plants without deriving nutrients from them. Although largely confined to the tropics, there are a few exceptions, such as Viridothelium virens, which is found in temperate areas and occasionally on substrates other than bark. This distribution and ecological pattern closely resemble that of the family Graphidaceae, but with differences: Graphidaceae species are more prevalent in extra-tropical regions and on a variety of substrates.

The Trypetheliaceae are often observed in semi-exposed or fully sun-exposed environments, such as forest canopies, open savannahs, and dry forests. In these settings, they frequently contribute to extensive crustose lichen communities, distinguished by their production of yellow to orange pigments. Species with green thalli and partly immersed or covered ascomata are more commonly found in the understory of rainforests. It has suggested that many undiscovered species may reside in these less studied, exposed canopy microhabitats.

In some species with very large ascospores, the spores may protrude through the opening of the fruiting body and remain on or near the thallus surface rather than being dispersed far into the air. It has been suggested that this pattern could favour establishment close to the parent thallus, or could facilitate dispersal by trunk-walking invertebrates such as ants or termites, although this remains speculative.

== Genera ==
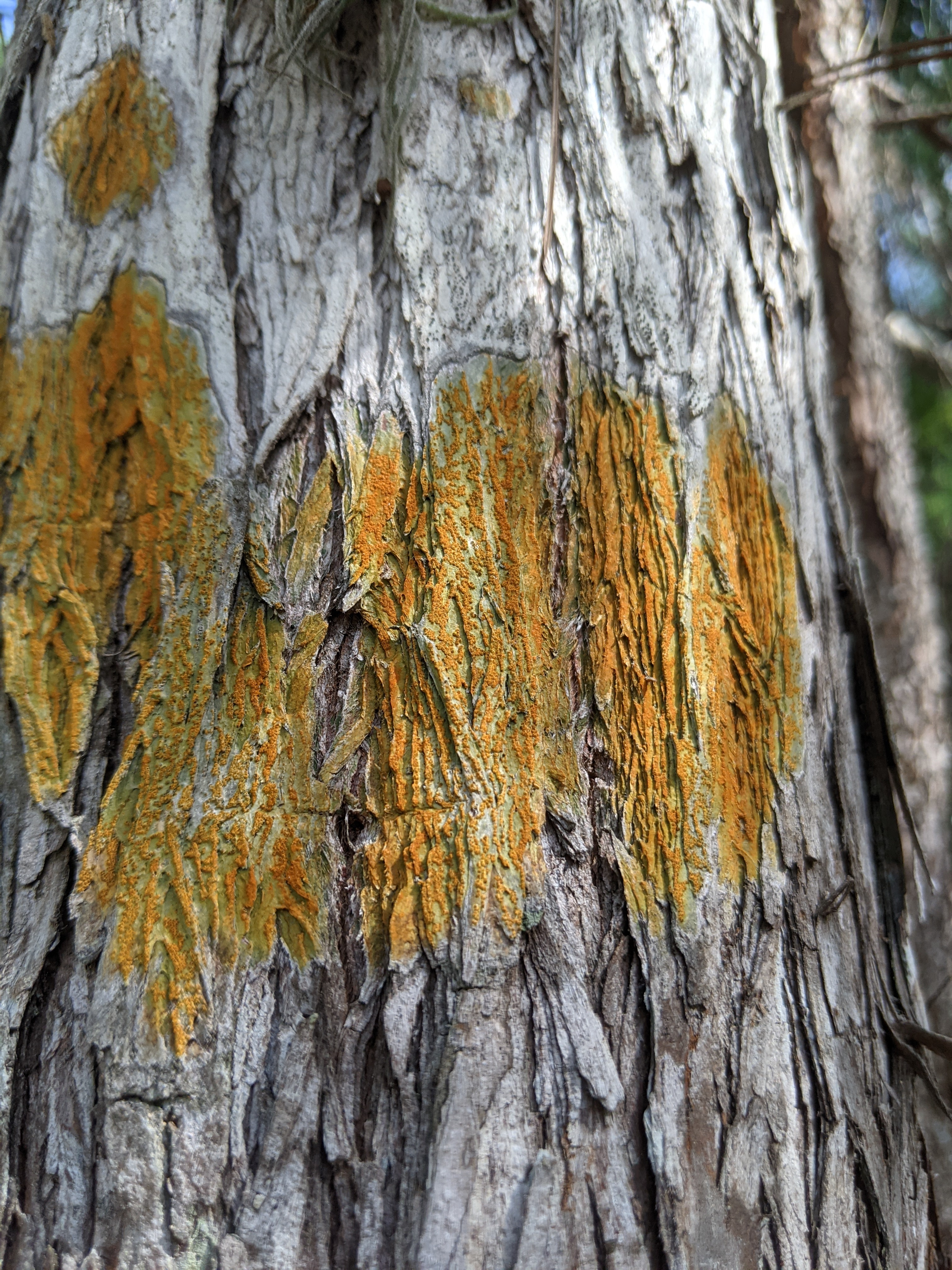
Astrothelium aeneum

- Alloarthopyrenia Phukhams., Lücking & K.D.Hyde (2016) – 1 sp.
- Aptrootia Lücking & Sipman (2007) – 3 spp.
- Arthopyrenia A.Massal. (1852) – 55 spp.
- Architrypethelium Aptroot (1991) – 8 spp.
- Astrothelium Eschw. (1824) – ca. 275 spp.
- Bathelium Ach. (1803) – 16 spp.
- Bogoriella Zahlbr. (1928) – 29 spp.
- Constrictolumina Lücking, M.P.Nelsen & Aptroot (2016) – 9 spp.
- Dictyomeridium Aptroot, M.P.Nelsen & Lücking (2016) – 7 spp.
- Laurera Rchb. (1841) – 2 spp.
- Macroconstrictolumina Lücking, R.Miranda & Aptroot (2020) – 4 spp.
- Marcelaria Aptroot, M.P.Nelsen & Parnmen (2013) – 3 spp.
- Mycomicrothelia Keissl. (1936) – 8 spp.
- Nigrovothelium Lücking, M.P.Nelsen & Aptroot (2016) – 3 spp.
- Polymeridium (Müll.Arg.) R.C.Harris (1980) – 51 spp.
- Polypyrenula D.Hawksw. (1985) – 1 sp.
- Pseudobogoriella Lücking, R.Miranda & Aptroot (2020) – 16 spp.
- Pseudopyrenula Müll.Arg. (1883) – 21 spp.
- Trypethelium Spreng. (1804) – 16 spp.
- Viridothelium Lücking, M.P.Nelsen & Aptroot (2016) – 11 spp.

In 2020, Hongsanan and colleagues synonymized the type species of Distothelia and Novomicrothelia with Bogoriella and confirmed the placement of this genus in Trypetheliaceae.
