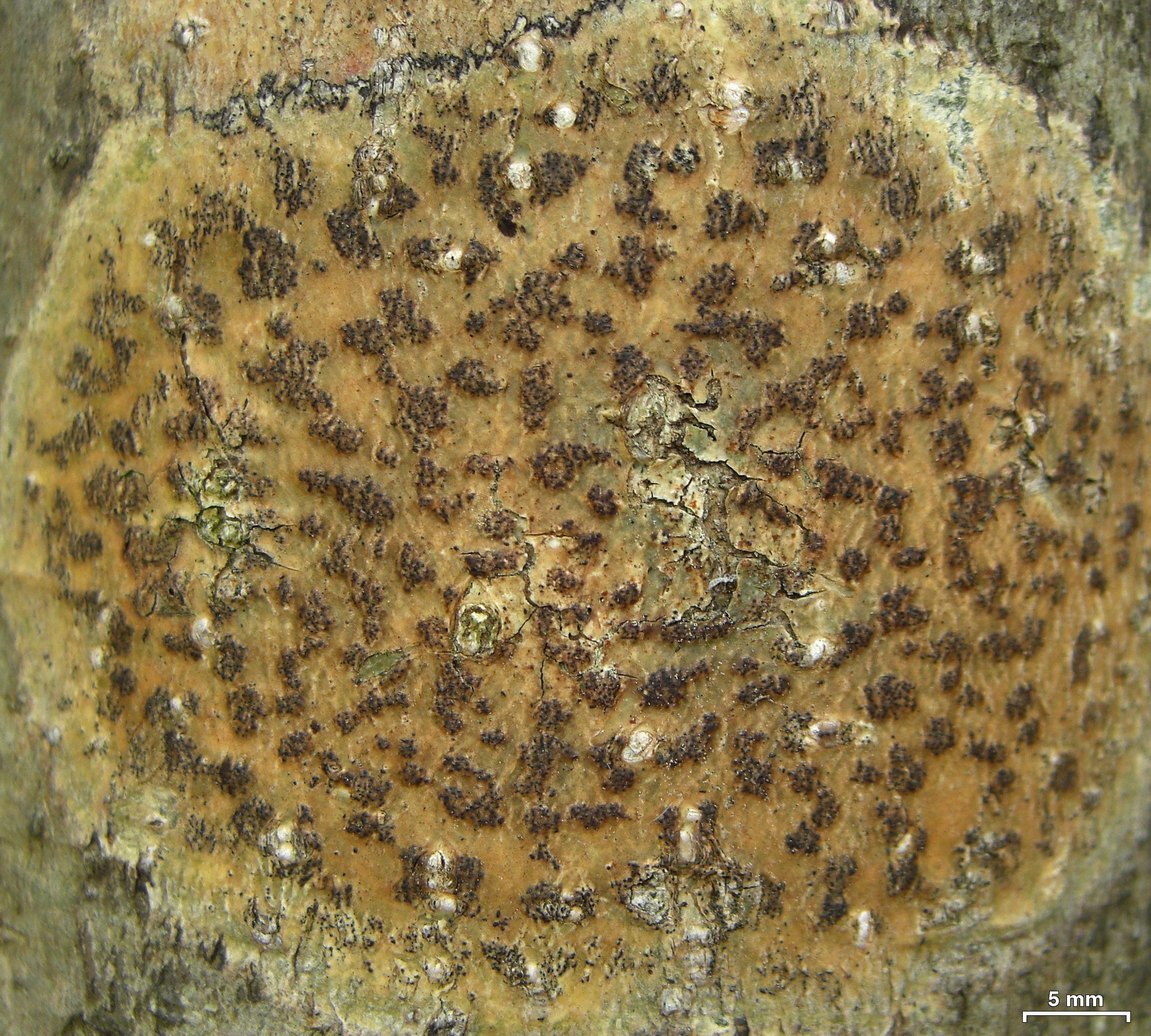
- Viridothelium virens

Scientific classification
- Kingdom: Fungi
- Division: Ascomycota
- Class: Dothideomycetes
- Order: Trypetheliales; Lücking, Aptroot & Sipman (2008)

Type genus
- Trypethelium Spreng. (1804)

Families
- Polycoccaceae; Trypetheliaceae

= Trypetheliales =

Order of fungi

The Trypetheliales are an order of fungi in the class Dothideomycetes. Most of the species in the order form lichens, although some are lichenicolous fungi. Trypetheliales contains two families, Polycoccaceae and Trypetheliaceae.

== Taxonomy ==
Trypetheliales was circumscribed in 2008 by Robert Lücking, André Aptroot, and Harrie Sipman to reflect a well-supported, phylogenetically distinct lineage within the class Dothideomycetes; the order is based on the family Trypetheliaceae as its type. Most members form lichens with trentepohlioid (orange-pigmented) green algae, though a few are non-lichenised fungi.

In the modern sense, the order contains two families: Polycoccaceae, comprising mainly lichenicolous fungi (species that live on or in other lichens), and Trypetheliaceae, which are chiefly lichen-forming. This composition captures the group's evolutionary coherence while recognising the different ecological strategies represented within it.

Aptroot and Lücking also addressed a long-standing nomenclatural confusion around Trypetheliaceae as published by Franz Gerhard Eschweiler in 1824. Some databases had treated Eschweiler's name as invalid—or as if it were an order—because he used the historical Latin term "cohors". Under the International Code of Nomenclature, however, rank is determined by the author's intent and usage: Eschweiler explicitly described a "familia" and employed the conventional "-aceae" ending, so Trypetheliaceae is a valid family-rank name, not an order. Consequently, the order name Trypetheliales is correctly attributed to Lücking, Aptroot and Sipman (2008), and not to Eschweiler.

== Description ==
Members of Trypetheliales are ascomycetes that are most often lichenised with trentepohlioid algae; less commonly they occur as bark-dwelling saprobes or as lichenicolous fungi (species living on other lichens). The sexual reproductive structures are perithecia—flask-shaped fruiting bodies with a small pore (ostiole)—which may occur singly or in tight groups that can merge; their ostioles may remain separate or become confluent. Perithecia are typically round and range from immersed in the substrate to sitting at the surface (sessile), with walls that are dark brown to nearly carbonised. Within the fruiting body, the tissue between the asci comprises slender hyphae that branch abundantly and interconnect (anastomose) to form a net-like mesh.

The asci are fissitunicate (with a double wall that separates during spore discharge) and do not show an amyloid reaction in iodine (I−). Ascospores are ellipsoid to spindle-shaped and frequently develop internal thickenings of the inner spore wall; these thickenings often give the spore cavities (lumina) an angular, diamond-like outline, though a rounded outline also occurs. Spores are usually colourless, but in some species they become brown to dark brown.

== Families and genera ==
As of October 2021, Species Fungorum accepts 2 families, 25 genera, and 478 species in the Trypetheliales.

- Polycoccaceae Ertz, Hafellner & Diederich (2015)

Clypeococcum – ca. 10 spp.
Polycoccum – ca. 60 spp.

- Trypetheliaceae Eschw. (1824)

Alloarthopyrenia – 1 sp.
Aptrootia – 3 spp.
Architrypethelium – 8 spp.
Arthopyrenia – 55 spp.
Astrothelium – ca. 275 spp.
Bathelium – 16 spp.
Bogoriella – 29 spp.
Constrictolumina – 9 spp.
Dictyomeridium – 7 spp.
Laurera – 2 spp.
Marcelaria – 3 spp.
Mycomicrothelia – 8 spp.
Nigrovothelium – 3 spp.
Polymeridium – 51 spp.
Polypyrenula – 1 sp.
Pseudopyrenula – 21 spp.
Trypethelium – 16 spp.
Viridothelium – 11 spp.
