= List of former species of Arthopyrenia =

This is a list of former species on the fungal genus Arthopyrenia, with the new species name and family name (or order if still uncertain placement). Also includes species that are now synonyms of accepted Arthopyrenia species.

As accepted by Species Fungorum, (note out of the 355 records list, only 56 are still Arthopyrenia);

== A ==
- A. advenula (Nyl.) H. Olivier (1903) = Phaeospora triphractoides, Dothideomycetes
- A. advenula var. peregrina (Flot.) H. Olivier (1906) = Merismatium peregrinum, Verrucariaceae
- A. aeruginella (Nyl.) Arnold (1885) = Mycoglaena myricae, Dothideomycetes
- A. affinis (A. Massal.) R.C. Harris (1973) = Swinscowia affinis, Strigulaceae
- A. aggregata (Mudd) Arnold (1874) = Stigmidium aggregatum, Mycosphaerellaceae
- A. alba (Schrad.) Zahlbr. (1921) = Acrocordia gemmata, Monoblastiaceae
- A. albida Müll. Arg. (1884) = Polymeridium albidum, Trypetheliaceae
- A. albocinerea (Kremp.) Müll. Arg. (1883) = Polymeridium albocinereum, Trypetheliaceae
- A. allogena (Nyl.) Arnold (1871) = Stigmidium allogenum, Mycosphaerellaceae
- A. americana A. Massal. (1852) = Anisomeridium americanum, Monoblastiaceae
- A. analepta sensu auct. brit. p.p., = Naetrocymbe punctiformis Naetrocymbaceae
- A. analepta var. atomaria (Ach.) Jatta (1900) = Leptorhaphis atomaria, Naetrocymbaceae
- A. analepta var. fallax (Nyl.) Bagl. & Carestia (1881) = Pseudosagedia fallax, Porinaceae
- A. analepta var. punctiformis (Pers.) Kreyer (1913) = Naetrocymbe punctiformis, Naetrocymbaceae
- A. analepta var. pyrenastrella (Nyl.) P. Syd. (1887) = Naetrocymbe punctiformis, Naetrocymbaceae
- A. analeptella (Nyl.) Arnold (1885) = Arthopyrenia analepta, Trypetheliaceae
- A. analeptoides A.L. Sm. (1911) = Mycoporum antecellens, Mycoporaceae
- A. angermannica G.B.F. Nilsson (1931) = Collemopsidium angermannicum, Xanthopyreniaceae
- A. anisoloba Müll. Arg. (1883) = Anisomeridium anisolobum, Monoblastiaceae
- A. antecellens (Nyl.) Arnold (1871) = Mycoporum antecellens, Mycoporaceae
- A. apocalypta (Rehm ex Arnold) H. Olivier (1906) = Lasiosphaeriopsis stereocaulicola, Nitschkiaceae
- A. apposita (Nyl.) H. Olivier (1902) = Bogoriella apposita, Trypetheliaceae
- A. arenicola (Leight.) A.L. Sm. (1911) = Magmopsis argilospila, Ascomycota class
- A. areniseda A.L. Sm. (1911) = Collemopsidium arenisedum, Xanthopyreniaceae
- A. argilospila (Nyl.) A.L. Sm. (1918) = Magmopsis argilospila, Ascomycota
- A. arthonioides A. Massal. (1852) = Tomasellia arthonioides, Naetrocymbaceae
- A. aspiciliae J. Lahm (1865) = Stigmidium aspiciliae, Mycosphaerellaceae
- A. atomaria Müll. Arg. (1862) = Naetrocymbe punctiformis, Naetrocymbaceae
- A. atomariella (Nyl.) Hulting (1900) = Didymella atomariella, Didymellaceae
- A. atomarioides Müll. Arg. (1885) = Naetrocymbe atomarioides, Naetrocymbaceae
- A. atractospora Zahlbr. (1935) = Naetrocymbe atractospora, Naetrocymbaceae
- A. austriaca (Körb.) J. Nowak & Tobol. (1975) = Pseudosagedia austriaca, Porinaceae

== B ==
- A. beloniza (Stirt.) Müll. Arg. (1894) = Rhytidiella beloniza, Cucurbitariaceae
- A. biformis (Schaer.) A. Massal. (1855) = Anisomeridium biforme, Monoblastiaceae
- A. bryospila (Nyl.) Arnold (1871) = Frigidopyrenia bryospila, Ascomycota
- A. byssacea A.L. Sm. (1911) = Anisomeridium biforme, Monoblastiaceae

== C ==
- A. caesia (Nyl.) Zahlbr. (1921) = Collemopsidium caesium, Xanthopyreniaceae
- A. calcariae Flagey (1896) = Zwackhiomyces calcariae, Xanthopyreniaceae
- A. callithrix Norman (1884) = Didymella callithrix, Didymellaceae
- A. carinthiaca J. Steiner (1913) = Anisomeridium carinthiacum, Monoblastiaceae
- A. carpinea (Pers.) Müll. Arg. (1862) = Segestria carpinea, Pertusariaceae
- A. catapasta (Nyl.) Müll. Arg. (1883) = Polymeridium catapastum, Trypetheliaceae
- A. cavata (Ach.) R.C. Harris (1973) = Acrocordia cavata, Monoblastiaceae
- A. cembrina (Anzi) Grummann ex D. Hawksw. (1980) = Naetrocymbe punctiformis, Naetrocymbaceae
- A. chlorococca (Leight.) A.L. Sm. (1911) = Normandina acroglypta, Verrucariaceae
- A. chlorotica (Ach.) H. Olivier (1884) = Pseudosagedia chlorotica, Porinaceae
- A. chlorotica var. carpinea (Pers.) Boistel (1903) = Segestria carpinea, Pertusariaceae
- A. chlorotica var. olivacea (Pers.) Boistel (1903) = Arthopyrenia analepta
- A. chlorotica var. persicina (Körb.) H. Olivier (1902) = Segestria persicina, Pertusariaceae
- A. cinchonae (Ach.) Müll. Arg. (1883) = Constrictolumina cinchonae, Trypetheliaceae
- A. cinefaciens (Nyl.) Zahlbr. (1921) = Phylloporis cinefaciens, Strigulaceae
- A. cinereopruinosa sensu auct. brit. p.p. (pre-c. 1980) = Anisomeridium ranunculosporum, Monoblastiaceae
- A. cinereopruinosa var. galactites (DC.) Anzi (1860) = Arthonia galactites, Arthoniaceae
- A. cinereopruinosa var. mezerei Müll. Arg. (1870) = Arthopyrenia cinereopruinosa
- A. cinereopruinosa var. pinicola (Hepp) Bausch (1869) = Didymella pinicola, Didymellaceae
- A. cinereopruinosa var. stigmatella (Ach.) Jatta (1900) = Swinscowia stigmatella, Strigulaceae
- A. coepulona Norman (1868) = Zwackhiomyces coepulonus, Xanthopyreniaceae
- A. confluens R.C. Harris (1995) = Constrictolumina leucostoma, Trypetheliaceae
- A. conformis (Nyl.) Müll. Arg. (1894) = Anisomeridium biforme, Monoblastiaceae
- A. coniodes (Nyl.) Zopf (1896) = Sphaerellothecium coniodes, Mycosphaerellaceae
- A. conoidea (Fr.) Zahlbr. (1903) = Acrocordia conoidea, Monoblastiaceae
- A. conoidea f. carnea (Arnold) Zahlbr. (1922) = Acrocordia conoidea, Monoblastiaceae
- A. consequens (Nyl.) Arnold (1871) = Pyrenocollema halodytes, Ascomycota
- A. consequens var. halodytes (Nyl.) H. Olivier (1884) = Pyrenocollema halodytes, Ascomycota
- A. consobrina (Nyl.) Müll. Arg. (1883) = Anisomeridium consobrinum, Monoblastiaceae
- A. conspurcans Th. Fr. (1867) = Zwackhiomyces dispersus, Xanthopyreniaceae
- A. contendens (Nyl.) Müll. Arg. (1883) = Polymeridium contendens, Trypetheliaceae
- A. cookei (Linds.) Arnold (1874) = Muellerella lichenicola, Verrucariaceae
- A. corniculata (Hoffm.) H. Olivier (1903) = Obryzum corniculatum, Obryzaceae
- A. cortitecta Norman (1884) = Didymella cortitecta, Didymellaceae
- A. coryli (A. Massal.) Müll. Arg. (1862) = Pyrenula coryli, Pyrenulaceae
- A. crombiei A.L. Sm. (1911) = Arthopyrenia cerasi

== D ==
- A. decolorella (Nyl.) Tomin (1938) = Cercidospora decolorella, Dothideomycetes
- A. diluta (Fée) Harm. (1911) = Pseudopyrenula diluta, Trypetheliaceae
- A. dirhyponta Norman (1884) = Didymella dirhyponta, Didymellaceae
- A. dispersa J. Lahm ex Körb. (1865) = Zwackhiomyces dispersus, Xanthopyreniaceae

== E ==
- A. endobrya Döbbeler & Poelt (1981) = Acrocordia endobrya, Monoblastiaceae
- A. endococcoidea (Nyl.) H. Olivier (1906) = Phaeospora rimosicola, Dothideomycetes
- A. epicarphinea f. lecaniae H. Olivier ex Cl. Roux & Nav.-Ros. (1998) = Stigmidium bellemerei, Mycosphaerellaceae
- A. epicymatia (Wallr.) Müll. Arg. (1884) = Stigmidium schaereri, Mycosphaerellaceae
- A. epidermidis (Ach.) A. Massal. (1852) = Leptorhaphis epidermidis, Naetrocymbaceae
- A. epidermidis b galactites (DC.) Mudd (1861) = Arthonia galactites, Arthoniaceae
- A. epidermidis f. cinereopruinosa (Schaer.) Boistel (1903) = Arthopyrenia cinereopruinosa
- A. epidermidis f. fallax (Nyl.) Arnold (1871) = Pseudosagedia fallax, Porinaceae
- A. epidermidis var. albissima (Ach.) Boistel (1903) = Leptorhaphis epidermidis, Naetrocymbaceae
- A. epidermidis var. analepta (Ach.) Mudd (1861) = Arthopyrenia analepta
- A. epidermidis var. antecellens (Nyl.) H. Olivier (1884) = Mycoporum antecellens, Mycoporaceae
- A. epidermidis var. atomaria sensu Mudd = Naetrocymbe punctiformis, Naetrocymbaceae
- A. epidermidis var. atomaria (Ach.) Mudd (1861) = Leptorhaphis atomaria, Naetrocymbaceae
- A. epidermidis var. betularia (Nyl.) Boistel (1903) = Mycoglaena betularia, Dothideomycetes
- A. epidermidis var. cerasi (Schrad.) Boistel (1903) = Arthopyrenia cerasi
- A. epidermidis var. cinerea sensu Mudd = Mycoporum antecellens, Mycoporaceae
- A. epidermidis var. cinerea (Fr.) Mudd (1861) = Swinscowia stigmatella, Strigulaceae
- A. epidermidis var. cinereopruinosa (Schaer.) Mudd (1861) = Arthopyrenia cinereopruinosa
- A. epidermidis var. fallax (Nyl.) Mudd (1861) = Pseudosagedia fallax, Porinaceae
- A. epidermidis var. grisea (Schleich. ex Schaer.) Rabenh. (1870) = Arthopyrenia grisea
- A. epidermidis var. lactea (Ach.) A.L. Sm. (1911) = Mycoporum lacteum, Mycoporaceae
- A. epidermidis var. pluriseptata Boistel (1903) = Blastodesmia nitida, Pyrenulaceae
- A. epidermidis var. punctiformis (Pers.) Mudd (1861) = Naetrocymbe punctiformis, Naetrocymbaceae
- A. epidermidis var. pyrenastrella (Nyl.) Rabenh. (1870) = Naetrocymbe punctiformis, Naetrocymbaceae
- A. epidermidis var. rhyponta (Ach.) Boistel (1903) = Naetrocymbe rhyponta, Naetrocymbaceae
- A. epigaeoides (Nyl.) H. Olivier (1902) = Segestria mammillosa, Pertusariaceae
- A. epipolaea f. carnea (Arnold) Mig. (1930) = Acrocordia conoidea, Monoblastiaceae
- A. epipolytropa (Mudd) H. Olivier (1906) = Cercidospora epipolytropa, Dothideomycetes
- A. esenbeckiana (Fée) R.C. Harris (1995) = Constrictolumina esenbeckiana, Trypetheliaceae
- A. excellens Nyl. ex Müll. Arg. (1885) = Anisomeridium excellens, Monoblastiaceae
- A. exstans Müll. Arg. (1895) = Anisomeridium subnectendum, Monoblastiaceae

== F ==
- A. faginea (Schaer.) Swinscow (1965) = Swinscowia stigmatella, Strigulaceae
- A. faginea var. alpestris (Vězda) Swinscow (1965) = Swinscowia alpestris, Strigulaceae
- A. fallax (Nyl.) Arnold (1873) = Pseudosagedia fallax, Porinaceae
- A. fallax f. pinicola (Hepp) Arnold (1885) = Didymella pinicola, Didymellaceae
- A. finkii Zahlbr. (1921) = Acrocordia megalospora, Monoblastiaceae
- A. forana var. calcivora (Nyl.) Boistel (1903) = Thelidium incavatum, Verrucariaceae
- A. foveolata A.L. Sm. (1911) = Collemopsidium foveolatum, Xanthopyreniaceae
- A. fraxini A. Massal. (1852) = Naetrocymbe fraxini, Naetrocymbaceae
- A. fumago (Wallr.) Körb. (1855) = Naetrocymbe punctiformis, Naetrocymbaceae
- A. fumago (Wallr.) Mudd (1861) = Naetrocymbe punctiformis, Naetrocymbaceae
- A. fuscatae (Arnold) Arnold (1874) = Stigmidium fuscatae, Mycosphaerellaceae
- A. fuscatae var. olivaceae (Arnold) Arnold (1874) = Stigmidium lichenum, Mycosphaerellaceae

== G ==
- A. gemmata (Ach.) A. Massal. (1852) = Acrocordia gemmata, Monoblastiaceae
- A. geographicicola (Arnold) H. Olivier (1907) = Opegrapha geographicicola, Opegraphaceae
- A. glabra (A. Massal.) J. Nowak & Tobol. (1975) = Swinscowia glabra, Strigulaceae
- A. glabrata var. coryli (A. Massal.) H. Olivier (1884) = Pyrenula coryli, Pyrenulaceae
- A. glebarum Arnold (1887) = Stigmidium glebarum, Mycosphaerellaceae
- A. globularis Körb. (1855) = Didymella globularis, Didymellaceae
- A. grisea sensu auct. brit., non (Schleich. ex Schaer.) Körb. = Arthopyrenia cerasi
- A. guinetii Müll. Arg. (1878) = Didymella guinetii, Didymellaceae
- A. gyalectoides M. Knowles ex A.L. Sm. (1926) = Pyrenocollema halodytes, Ascomycota
- A. gyrophorarum Arnold (1896) = Stigmidium gyrophorarum, Mycosphaerellaceae

== H ==
- A. halizoa (Leight.) Arnold (1891) = Verrucaria halizoa, Verrucariaceae
- A. halodytes sensu auct. brit. p.p., = Pyrenocollema orustense, Ascomycota
- A. halodytes sensu auct. brit. p.p., = Collemopsidium sublitorale, Xanthopyreniaceae
- A. halodytes (Nyl.) Arnold (1891) = Pyrenocollema halodytes, Ascomycota
- A. halodytes var. hollii A.L. Sm. (1911) = Pyrenocollema halodytes, Ascomycota
- A. hyalospora (Nyl.) Fink (1935) = Lithothelium hyalosporum, Pyrenulaceae
- A. hygrophila (Arnold) H. Olivier (1906) = Zwackhiomyces dispersus; Xanthopyreniaceae
- A. hygrophila var. berengeriana (Arnold) H. Olivier (1906) = Zwackhiomyces berengerianus, Xanthopyreniaceae
- A. hygrophila var. punctilla (Arnold) H. Olivier (1906) = Stigmidium punctillum, Mycosphaerellaceae

== I/J/K ==
- A. inconspicua J. Lahm (1865) = Lichenopeltella inconspicua, Microthyriaceae
- A. infernalis (Mont.) Müll. Arg. (1885) = Megalotremis infernalis, Monoblastiaceae
- A. innata (Arnold) Arnold (1874) = Stigmidium allogenum, Mycosphaerellaceae
- A. kelpii Körb. (1865) = Pyrenocollema halodytes, Ascomycota
- A. knightii Walt. Watson (1933) = Zwackhiomyces socialis, Xanthopyreniaceae

== L ==
- A. laburni Leight. ex Arnold (1861) = Naetrocymbe punctiformis, Naetrocymbaceae
- A. lapponina Anzi (1864) = Arthopyrenia analepta
- A. latitans (Nyl.) H. Olivier (1906) = Didymellopsis latitans, Xanthopyreniaceae
- A. lectissima (Fr.) H. Olivier (1884) = Porina lectissima, Pertusariaceae
- A. lectissima var. holochrodes (Nyl.) Mong. (1914) = Porina lectissima, Pertusariaceae
- A. lectissima var. leptalea (Durieu & Mont.) Boistel (1903) = Segestria leptalea, Pertusariaceae
- A. leptalea (Durieu & Mont.) H. Olivier (1902) = Segestria leptalea, Pertusariaceae
- A. leptotera (Nyl.) Arnold (1871) = Stigmidium marinum, Mycosphaerellaceae
- A. leptotera f. brachyspora (Erichsen) Grummann (1963) = Stigmidium marinum, Mycosphaerellaceae
- A. lichenum Arnold (1876) = Stigmidium lichenum, Mycosphaerellaceae
- A. lichenum f. fuscatae (Arnold) Arnold (1885) = Stigmidium fuscatae, Mycosphaerellaceae
- A. lichenum f. olivaceae (Arnold) Zopf (1896) = Stigmidium lichenum, Mycosphaerellaceae
- A. limitans Müll. Arg. (1883) = Anisomeridium americanum, Monoblastiaceae
- A. linearis (Leight.) Mudd (1861) = Pseudosagedia linearis, Porinaceae
- A. litoralis sensu auct. brit. = Collemopsidium sublitorale, Xanthopyreniaceae
- A. litoralis var. leptotera (Nyl.) Boistel (1903) = Stigmidium marinum, Mycosphaerellaceae
- A. lomnitzensis Stein (1879) = Sagediopsis lomnitzensis, Adelococcaceae
- A. lucens (Taylor) Mudd (1861) = Pseudosagedia lucens, Porinaceae
- A. lyrata R.C. Harris (1980) = Macroconstrictolumina lyrata, Trypetheliaceae

== M ==
- A. macrospora (A. Massal.) J. Steiner (1909) = Acrocordia macrospora, Monoblastiaceae
- A. macrospora Fink (1910) = Acrocordia megalospora, Monoblastiaceae
- A. macrospora (Makhija & Patw.) Kr.P. Singh & G.P. Sinha (2010) = Arthopyrenia agasthiensis
- A. macularis var. codonoidea (Leight.) Mudd (1861) = Pseudosagedia aenea, Porinaceae
- A. macularis var. fusiformis (Leight.) Mudd (1861) = Verrucaria fusiformis, Verrucariaceae
- A. macularis var. trachona (Ach.) Mudd (1861) = Aquacidia trachona, Byssolomataceae
- A. majuscula (Nyl.) Zahlbr. (1922) = Macroconstrictolumina majuscula, Trypetheliaceae
- A. malaccitula (Nyl.) Zahlbr. (1921) = Macroconstrictolumina malaccitula, Trypetheliaceae
- A. marina (Deakin) A.L. Sm. (1911) = Stigmidium marinum, Mycosphaerellaceae
- A. marina f. tenuicula (B. de Lesd.) Zahlbr. (1921) = Stigmidium marinum, Mycosphaerellaceae
- A. megalospora Lönnr. (1858) = Naetrocymbe megalospora, Naetrocymbaceae
- A. mesotropa (Nyl.) Arnold (1871) = Thelidium minutulum, Verrucariaceae
- A. microspila Körb. (1865) = Stigmidium microspilum, Mycosphaerellaceae
- A. microspila f. pertusariae B. de Lesd. (1905) = Stigmidium microspilum, Mycosphaerellaceae
- A. monensis (Wheldon) Zahlbr. (1922) = Collemopsidium monense, Xanthopyreniaceae
- A. mycoporoides Müll. Arg. (1888) = Mycoporum mycoporoides, Mycoporaceae
- A. myricae (Nyl.) Zahlbr. (1903) = Mycoglaena myricae, Dothideomycetes

== N/O ==
- A. neesii Körb. (1855) = Massarina neesii, Massarinaceae
- A. nitescens Salwey ex Mudd (1861) = Naetrocymbe nitescens, Naetrocymbaceae
- A. nitida (Weigel) H. Olivier (1884) = Pyrenula nitida, Pyrenulaceae
- A. nitida var. nitidella (Flörke) H. Olivier (1884) = Pyrenula nitidella, Pyrenulaceae
- A. nylanderi (Hepp) Riedl (1990) = Thelidium nylanderi, Verrucariaceae
- A. obscura (Pers.) Riedl (1963) = Mycoporellum obscurum, Mycoporaceae
- A. obtecta (Müll. Arg.) Müll. Arg. (1883) = Lithothelium obtectum, Pyrenulaceae
- A. oculata Müll. Arg. (1895) = Polymeridium sulphurescens, Trypetheliaceae
- A. olivacea sensu auct. brit., = Pseudosagedia borreri, Porinaceae
- A. olivacea (Schaer.) A. Massal. (1852) = Pseudosagedia borreri, Porinaceae
- A. olivacea (Pers.) Mudd (1861) = Arthopyrenia analepta
- A. orustensis Erichsen (1930) = Pyrenocollema orustense, Ascomycota
- A. oxyspora (Nyl.) Mudd (1861) = Leptorhaphis epidermidis, Naetrocymbaceae
- A. oxyspora var. tremulae (Körb.) H. Olivier (1884) = Leptorhaphis tremulae, Naetrocymbaceae

== P ==
- A. padi Rabenh. (1858) = Naetrocymbe punctiformis, Naetrocymbaceae
- A. papularis (Fr.) Boistel (1903) = Thelidium papulare, Verrucariaceae
- A. pelvetiae (G.K. Sutherl.) D. Hawksw. (1980) = Pyrenocollema pelvetiae, Ascomycota
- A. perexigua (Müll. Arg.) Riedl (1963) = Mycoporellum perexiguum, Mycoporaceae
- A. persicina (Körb.) Boistel (1903) = Segestria persicina, Pertusariaceae
- A. persoonii A. Massal. (1855) = Naetrocymbe punctiformis, Naetrocymbaceae
- A. persoonii f. atomaria (Ach.) A. Massal. (1856) = Leptorhaphis atomaria, Naetrocymbaceae
- A. persoonii f. salicis (A. Massal.) Zahlbr. (1921) = Arthopyrenia salicis
- A. persoonii var. fraxini (A. Massal.) A. Massal. (1856) = Naetrocymbe fraxini, Naetrocymbaceae
- A. persoonii var. juglandis A. Massal. (1855) = Naetrocymbe punctiformis, Naetrocymbaceae
- A. persoonii var. proteiformis A. Massal. (1855) = Naetrocymbe punctiformis, Naetrocymbaceae
- A. persoonii var. punctiformis (Pers.) A. Massal. (1855) = Naetrocymbe punctiformis, Naetrocymbaceae
- A. phaeosporizans Zahlbr. (1909) = Mycoporopsis phaeosporizans, Dothideomycetidae
- A. picea Shirley (1889) = Astrosphaeriella picea, Astrosphaeriellaceae
- A. pinicola (Hepp) A. Massal. (1855) = Didymella pinicola, Didymellaceae
- A. pithyophila Th. Fr. & Blomb. (1867) = Mycoporopsis pithyophila, Dothideomycetidae
- A. planorbis (Ach.) Müll. Arg. (1888) = Constrictolumina planorbis, Trypetheliaceae
- A. pluriseptata Arnold (1891) = Blastodesmia nitida, Pyrenulaceae
- A. porocyphi Stein (1879) = Pharcidia porocyphi, Mycosphaerellaceae
- A. porospora Vain. (1896) = Constrictolumina porospora, Trypetheliaceae
- A. proteiformis (A. Massal.) A. Massal. (1885) = Naetrocymbe punctiformis, Naetrocymbaceae
- A. psorae (Anzi) Müll. Arg. (1884) = Stigmidium allogenum, Mycosphaerellaceae
- A. punctiformis sensu Coppins = Arthopyrenia salicis
- A. punctiformis sensu Coppins = Arthopyrenia carneobrunneola
- A. punctiformis sensu Coppins = Naetrocymbe nitescens, Naetrocymbaceae
- A. punctiformis (Pers.) A. Massal. (1852) = Naetrocymbe punctiformis, Naetrocymbaceae
- A. punctiformis a fallax (Nyl.) Anzi (1860) = Pseudosagedia fallax, Porinaceae
- A. punctiformis b analepta (Ach.) Anzi (1860) (= Arthopyrenia analepta
- A. punctiformis f. analepta sensu auct. brit. p.p. = Naetrocymbe punctiformis, Naetrocymbaceae
- A. punctiformis f. analepta (Ach.) Keissl. (1936) = Arthopyrenia analepta
- A. punctiformis f. globularis (Körb.) Keissl. (1936) = Didymella globularis, Didymellaceae
- A. punctiformis f. rhododendri Arnold (1872) = Naetrocymbe rhododendri, Naetrocymbaceae
- A. punctiformis f. salicis (A. Massal.) Jatta (1900) = Arthopyrenia salicis
- A. punctiformis subsp. fallax (Nyl.) Fink (1910) = Pseudosagedia fallax, Porinaceae
- A. punctiformis subsp. globularis (Körb.) Arnold (1885) = Didymella globularis, Didymellaceae
- A. punctiformis var. analepta (Ach.) Müll. Arg. (1862) = Arthopyrenia analepta
- A. punctiformis var. atomaria (Ach.) Anzi (1860) = Leptorhaphis atomaria, Naetrocymbaceae
- A. punctiformis var. cinereopruinosa (Schaer.) Kremp. (1861) = Arthopyrenia cinereopruinosa
- A. punctiformis var. fallax (Nyl.) Kremp. (1861) = Pseudosagedia fallax, Porinaceae
- A. punctiformis var. fraxini (A. Massal.) Anzi (1860) = Naetrocymbe fraxini, Naetrocymbaceae
- A. punctiformis var. juglandis (A. Massal.) Jatta (1900) = Naetrocymbe punctiformis, Naetrocymbaceae
- A. punctiformis var. pyrenastrella (Nyl.) Mig. (1930) = Naetrocymbe punctiformis, Naetrocymbaceae
- A. punctiformis var. rhyponta (Ach.) H. Olivier (1884) = Naetrocymbe rhyponta, Naetrocymbaceae
- A. punctillum Arnold (1873) = Stigmidium punctillum, Mycosphaerellaceae
- A. pycnostigma (Nyl.) H. Olivier (1903) = Leptosphaeria pycnostigma, Leptosphaeriaceae
- A. pyrenastrella (Nyl.) Norman (1872) = Naetrocymbe punctiformis, Naetrocymbaceae
- A. pyrenuloides (Fée) Müll. Arg. (1888) = Polymeridium pyrenuloides, Trypetheliaceae

== Q/R ==
- A. quassiicola (Fée) Müll. Arg. (1888) = Naetrocymbe quassiicola, Naetrocymbaceae
- A. quercus A. Massal. (1852) = Cyrtidula quercus, Dothideomycetes
- A. quinqueseptata (Nyl.) Müll. Arg. (1885) = Polymeridium quinqueseptatum, Trypetheliaceae
- A. ramalinae Müll. Arg. (1883) = Stigmidium ramalinae, Mycosphaerellaceae
- A. ranunculospora Coppins & P. James (1988) = Anisomeridium ranunculosporum, Monoblastiaceae
- A. rappii Zahlbr. (1935) = Mycoporopsis rappii, Dothideomycetidae
- A. rhaphispora (C. Knight) Shirley (1890) = Porina rhaphispora, Pertusariaceae
- A. rhyponta sensu auct. brit. p.p. = Naetrocymbe punctiformis, Naetrocymbaceae
- A. rhyponta sensu auct. brit. p.p. = Stigmidium microspilum, Mycosphaerellaceae
- A. rhyponta (Ach.) A. Massal. (1852) = Naetrocymbe rhyponta, Naetrocymbaceae
- A. rhyponta f. rhypontella (Nyl.) Arnold (1871) = Didymella rhypontella, Didymellaceae
- A. rhyponta var. fumago (Wallr.) Rabenh. (1870) = Naetrocymbe punctiformis, Naetrocymbaceae
- A. rhypontella (Nyl.) Hazsl. (1884) = Didymella rhypontella, Didymellaceae
- A. rivulorum Kernst. (1893) = Stigmidium rivulorum, Mycosphaerellaceae

== S ==
- A. salweyi (Leight. ex Nyl.) Zahlbr. (1922) = Acrocordia salweyi, Monoblastiaceae
- A. sanfordensis var. cedrina Zahlbr. (1935) = Naetrocymbe cedrina, Naetrocymbaceae
- A. saxicola A. Massal. (1855) = Naetrocymbe saxicola, Naetrocymbaceae
- A. siamensis Vain. (1921) = Polymeridium siamense, Trypetheliaceae
- A. socialis Körb. (1865) = Zwackhiomyces socialis, Xanthopyreniaceae
- A. sphaeroides sensu auct. brit. = Acrocordia gemmata, Monoblastiaceae
- A. sprucei f. verrucosa (Ach.) Boistel (1903) = Polyblastia verrucosa, Verrucariaceae
- A. sprucei var. pyrenophora (Ach.) Boistel (1903) = Thelidium pyrenophorum, Verrucariaceae
- A. stigmatella sensu A.L. Smith = Mycoporum antecellens, Mycoporaceae
- A. stigmatella (Ach.) A. Massal. (1855) = Swinscowia stigmatella, Strigulaceae
- A. stigmatella A.L. Sm. (1911) = Mycoporum antecellens, Mycoporaceae
- A. stramineoatra Vain. (1890) = Polymeridium stramineoatrum, Trypetheliaceae
- A. strontianensis Swinscow (1967) = Collemopsidium angermannicum, Xanthopyreniaceae
- A. subareniseda G. Salisb. (1953) = Collemopsidium subarenisedum, Xanthopyreniaceae
- A. subglobosa Vězda (1961) = Acrocordia subglobosa, Monoblastiaceae
- A. sublitoralis (Leight.) Arnold (1891) = Collemopsidium sublitorale, Xanthopyreniaceae
- A. sublitoralis f. foveolata (A.L. Sm.) H. Magn. (1950) = Collemopsidium foveolatum, Xanthopyreniaceae
- A. submicans (Nyl.) Arnold (1873) = Naetrocymbe nitescens, Naetrocymbaceae
- A. submuriformis R.C. Harris (1973) = Swinscowia submuriformis, Strigulaceae
- A. subnectenda (Nyl.) Zahlbr. (1922) = Anisomeridium subnectendum, Monoblastiaceae
- A. subnexa (Nyl.) Müll. Arg. (1891) = Anisomeridium subnexum, Monoblastiaceae
- A. suboculata Müll. Arg. (1895) = Polymeridium sulphurescens, Trypetheliaceae
- A. subprostans (Nyl.) Müll. Arg. (1883) = Anisomeridium subprostans, Monoblastiaceae
- A. suffusa (C. Knight) Müll. Arg. (1892) = Polymeridium suffusum, Trypetheliaceae
- A. sulphurescens Müll. Arg. (1882) = Polymeridium sulphurescens, Trypetheliaceae
- A. superposita (Nyl.) Arnold (1871) = Stigmidium superpositum, Mycosphaerellaceae

== T/U/V/W ==
- A. tartarina (Nyl.) H. Olivier (1906) = Sagediopsis campsteriana, Adelococcaceae
- A. taylorii (Carroll ex Nyl.) Mudd (1861) = Dichoporis taylorii, Strigulaceae
- A. tenuis R.C. Harris (1973) = Dichoporis tenuis, Strigulaceae
- A. terminata (Nyl.) Müll. Arg. (1890) = Anisomeridium terminatum, Monoblastiaceae
- A. tichothecioides Arnold (1869) = Pyrenocollema tichothecioides, Ascomycota
- A. tremulae (Körb.) Müll. Arg. (1862) = Leptorhaphis tremulae, Naetrocymbaceae
- A. ungeri (Flot. ex Körb.) Boistel (1903) = Thelidium pyrenophorum, Verrucariaceae
- A. verrucosaria (Linds.) Arnold (1874) = Cercidospora verrucosaria, Dothideomycetes
- A. viridescens Coppins (1988) = Anisomeridium viridescens, Monoblastiaceae
- A. viridula sensu A.L. Smith = Verrucaria elaeina, Verrucariaceae
- A. viridula A.L. Sm. (1911) = Verrucaria viridula, Verrucariaceae
- A. willeyana R.C. Harris (1973) = Anisomeridium polypori, Monoblastiaceae
