= Constrictolumina =

Scientific classification
- Kingdom: Fungi
- Division: Ascomycota
- Class: Dothideomycetes
- Order: Trypetheliales
- Family: Trypetheliaceae
- Genus: Constrictolumina; Lücking, M.P.Nelsen & Aptroot (2016)

Type species
- Constrictolumina cinchonae (Ach.) Lücking, M.P.Nelsen & Aptroot (2016)

Species
- C. cinchonae C. esenbeckiana C. leucostoma C. planorbis C. porospora

Genus of fungi

Constrictolumina is a genus of lichen-forming fungi in the family Trypetheliaceae. These tropical lichens form crusty growths that lack a protective outer layer and merge directly with their growing surface. They produce cone-shaped fruiting bodies that push up through the crust and release spores through a tiny opening at the tip. The genus gets its name from the distinctive spores, which have internal walls that fold inward and create narrowed, constricted spaces inside each spore.

== Taxonomy ==
The genus was circumscribed in 2016 by Robert Lücking, Matthew Nelsen, and André Aptroot, with Constrictolumina cinchonae assigned as the type species. The genus contains tropical species, formerly placed in genus Arthopyrenia, with a unique hamathecium.

== Description ==
Constrictolumina has a thallus that lacks a differentiated outer "skin" (non-corticate). In practice this means the crust has no distinct protective cortex and merges more directly with the substrate. The sexual fruiting bodies (apothecia) are produced singly and are roughly conical, pushing up through the thallus (erumpent) so that they sit partly to fully exposed; neighbouring fruit bodies may fuse sideways but they do not form larger compound structures (no pseudostromata). Each fruit body has a tiny pore at the top (an apical ostiole) through which the ascospores are released.

Internally, the fruit body contains a clear, colourless tissue (hamathecium) made of straight filaments that are thicker at the base and slimmer towards the top; these filaments do not fuse with one another. The spore sacs (asci) are club-shaped. The spores are colourless (hyaline) and usually divided by one to three cross-walls (1–3-septate), only rarely showing additional, partial longitudinal divisions (submuriform). A diagnostic feature is the irregular thickening of the inner spore wall (endospore): one or two cells within a spore often develop inward wall "folds" that look like incomplete septa (pseudosepta), giving the internal cavities a narrowed, constricted appearance—hence the genus name. Spore surfaces may be smooth or ornamented; they often develop a fine, granular ornamentation and only very rarely turn slightly brown with age. Small asexual structures (pycnidia) may also be present.

== Species ==
Five species are accepted in Constrictolumina:

- Constrictolumina cinchonae (Ach.) Lücking, M.P.Nelsen & Aptroot (2016)
- Constrictolumina esenbeckiana (Fée) Lücking, M.P.Nelsen & Aptroot (2016)
- Constrictolumina leucostoma (Müll.Arg.) Lücking, M.P.Nelsen & Aptroot (2016)
- Constrictolumina planorbis (Ach.) Lücking, M.P.Nelsen & Aptroot (2016)
- Constrictolumina porospora (Vain.) Lücking, M.P.Nelsen & Aptroot (2016)

Some species placed in Constrictolumina have since been transferred to the genus Macroconstrictolumina, newly circumscribed in 2020.
