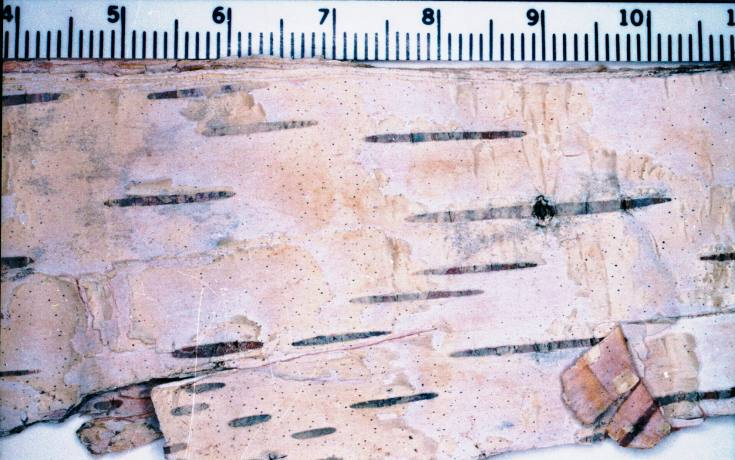
- Leptorhaphis epidermidis growing on paper birch

Scientific classification
- Kingdom: Fungi
- Division: Ascomycota
- Class: Dothideomycetes
- Order: Pleosporales
- Family: Naetrocymbaceae
- Genus: Leptorhaphis; Körb. (1855)

Species
- L. atomaria L. epidermidis L. haematommatum L. laricis L. maggiana L. novae-guineae L. opuntiicola L. tremulae

Synonyms
- Campylacia A.Massal. ex Beltr. (1858); Endophis Norman(1852); Leptomycorhaphis Cif. & Tomas. (1953); Leptorhaphiomyces Cif. & Tomas. (1953); Microtheliomyces Cif. & Tomas. (1953); Mycoleptorhaphis Cif. & Tomas. (1953)

= Leptorhaphis =

Genus of lichens

Leptorhaphis is a genus of lichens in the family Naetrocymbaceae. Members of the genus are commonly called birchbark dot lichens. The genus comprises eight recognized species that are widely distributed, primarily growing on the bark of deciduous trees such as birch, aspen, and larch. Most species lack a visible thallus and are considered saprobic rather than truly lichenized, as they generally do not form a stable partnership with algae.

== Taxonomy ==
The genus was circumscribed in 1855 by Gustav Wilhelm Körber, who assigned Leptorhaphis oxyspora as the type species. Körber distinguished Leptorhaphis from Arthopyrenia based on the elliptical-hemispherical to spherical apothecia that are innate-sessile with a distinctive hard, blackish outer wall that has a white, barely visible pore at the apex. The genus is characterised by having a colourless or faintly brownish gelatinous nucleus, greenish-brown rounded paraphyses, and 2–4 needle-like spores per ascus that are colourless and contained within short asci. Körber noted that while this genus had recently become known and he agreed with Massalongo's principles for establishing new genera through essential methodological agreement, he believed that after conducting thorough spore studies, one could assume a closer relationship with the latter genus based on the specified spore form.

== Description ==
Most species of Leptorhaphis appear to have no visible lichen body (thallus): the fungus lives largely within the outer bark of deciduous trees and shows at most a faint, smooth, pale-grey to greenish film that is poorly delimited. A true partnership with algae is generally absent, so the genus is regarded as saprobic rather than lichen-forming, though fresh material occasionally shows scattered filaments of Trentepohlia near the fruit bodies and, in rare cases such as L. atomaria, a thin, genuine thallus develops.

The reproductive structures dominate the visible morphology. Scattered, sometimes coalescing perithecia begin immersed in the bark but soon push outward, becoming hemispherical to nipple-shaped black domes with a minute pore. Each perithecium is capped by a dark involucrellum composed of tightly interlocking hyphae that stay unchanged in potassium hydroxide solution; in squash mounts these hyphae form a distinctive, clypeate (shield-like) lattice, and marginal strands may radiate to produce a basal fringe. Inside, a paler exciple lines the cavity, and a network of branched, anastomosing pseudoparaphyses threads the clear hymenial gel, which stains from yellow-orange to pale blue in iodine. The asci are fissitunicate cylinders that typically house eight, sometimes up to sixteen, colourless ascospores. Those spores are thin-walled, gently curved to sigmoid rods with one to three cross-walls, a shape (acicular-fusiform) that readily separates Leptorhaphis from related bark fungi. Asexual pycnidia, sunk in or barely protruding from the bark, release similar but smaller rod-shaped conidia, while secondary metabolites have not been detected in the genus.

== Species ==
- Leptorhaphis atomaria (Ach.) Szatala (1927)
- Leptorhaphis epidermidis (Ach.) Th.Fr. (1861)
- Leptorhaphis haematommatum Hafellner & Kalb (1995)
- Leptorhaphis laricis (J.Lahm) M.B.Aguirre (1991)
- Leptorhaphis maggiana (A.Massal.) Körb. (1865)
- Leptorhaphis novae-guineae Szatala (1956)
- Leptorhaphis opuntiicola L.A.Fiol & M.B.Aguirre (1993)
- Leptorhaphis tremulae Körb. (1855)
