= Pleomerium =

Scientific classification
- Kingdom: Fungi
- Division: Ascomycota
- Class: Sordariomycetes
- Order: Meliolales
- Family: Meliolaceae
- Genus: Pleomerium; Speg.

Type species
- Pleomerium fuscoviridescens (Rehm) Speg.

Genus of fungi

Pleomerium is a genus of fungi within the Meliolaceae family. This is a monotypic genus, containing the single species Pleomerium fuscoviridescens.

it was formerly Naetrocymbe fuscoviridescens (in the Naetrocymbe genus).
