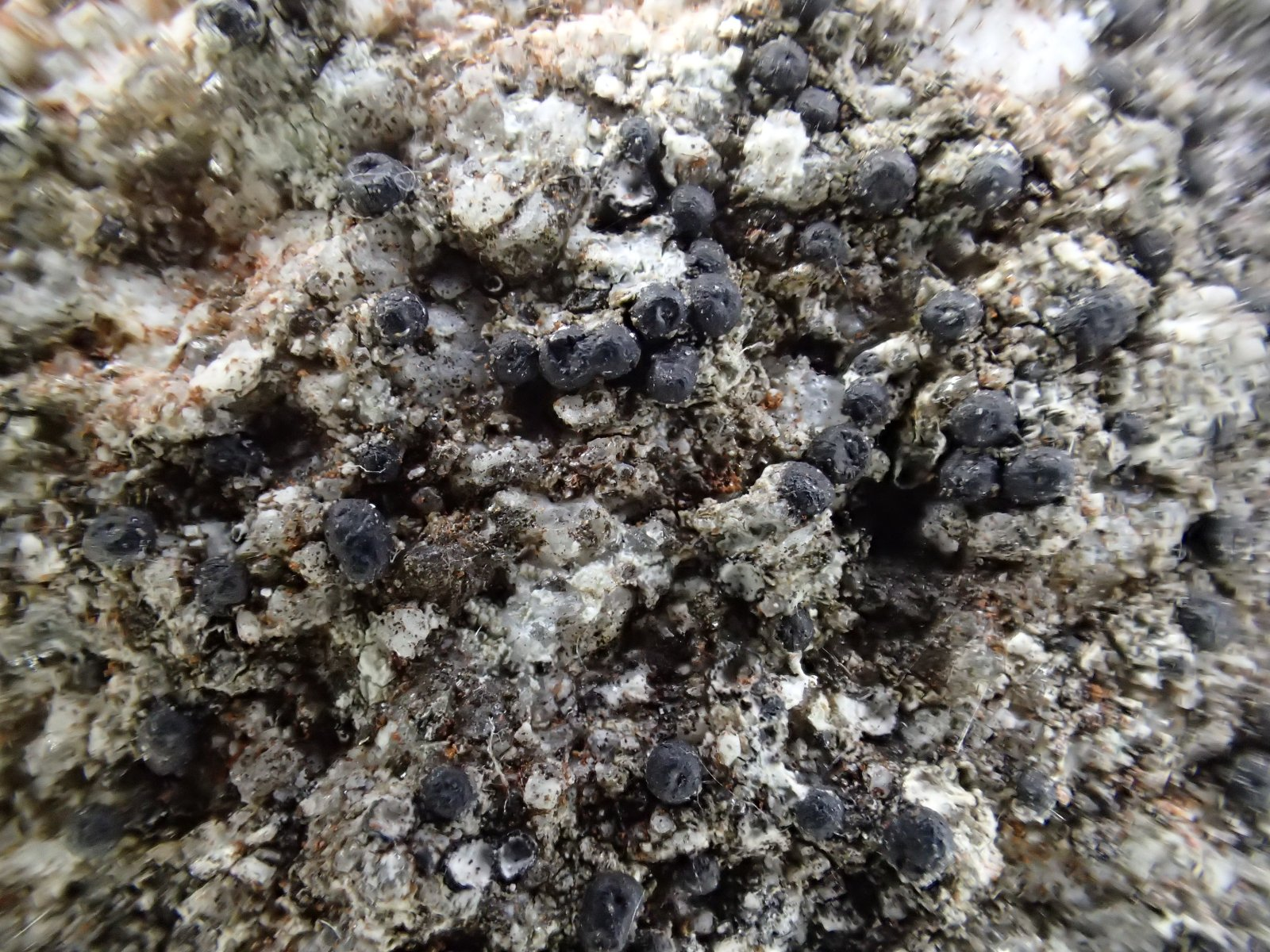
- Acrocordia macrospora

Scientific classification
- Kingdom: Fungi
- Division: Ascomycota
- Class: Dothideomycetes
- Order: Monoblastiales
- Family: Monoblastiaceae
- Genus: Acrocordia; A.Massal. (1854)

Type species
- Acrocordia garovaglii A.Massal. (1854)

= Acrocordia =

Genus of lichen-forming fungi

Acrocordia is a genus of lichen-forming fungi in the family Monoblastiaceae. These lichens form thin, whitish to pale grey crusts on tree bark and rocks, appearing as scattered black dots where their tiny flask-shaped reproductive structures emerge from the surface. The genus includes nine species found in various parts of the world, typically growing in mildly alkaline environments on broad-leaved trees or damp, mineral-rich rock faces.

== Taxonomy ==
The genus was circumscribed by the Italian lichenologist Abramo Bartolommeo Massalongo in 1854, with Acrocordia garovaglii assigned as the type species. Massalongo distinguished Acrocordia by its fruiting bodies, which are partially buried to prominent and cone-shaped or dome-like, and by its gelatinous thallus structure. The genus is characterised by spore-containing sacs with eight ascospores each, accompanied by thread-like structures, and distinctive greenish spores that are somewhat constricted in the middle. Massalongo described the thallus as having a chalky or powdery appearance. The type species, A. gemmata, had previously been placed in the genus Arthopyrenia, while A. garovagii had been classified under various other names by earlier lichenologists.

== Description ==
Acrocordia usually presents as a thin, patchy crust that spreads flat across its substrate or sits partly submerged within it. The thallus is whitish to pale grey and lacks a protective outer skin (cortex), so individual fungal cells merge directly with the bark or rock surface. Threaded through this tissue are microscopic filaments of the green alga Trentepohlia, whose orange-tinged cells provide the lichen's photosynthetic power. The species favour mildly alkaline substrates, growing on the bark of broad-leaved trees or on damp, base-rich rock faces.

Fruiting bodies are in the form of perithecia—tiny flask-shaped chambers embedded almost entirely in the thallus. From above they appear as scattered black dots (occasionally pinkish or whitish) that may coalesce into small clusters. Each perithecium is wrapped in a brown-black wall called the involucrellum, which remains unchanged in potassium hydroxide solution (KOH), and encloses a paler inner sphere (the exciple). The interior is filled with a clear gel traversed by slender, sparsely branched pseudoparaphyses—supporting filaments that remain intact even when the spores are released. Unlike many flask-shaped lichens, Acrocordia lacks periphyses, the short hairs that often line the pore.

The spore sacs (asci) are cylinder-shaped, split open along their length when mature (fissitunicate), and possess a swollen ocular chamber at the tip; above this lies a faint, hemispherical cap that stains with Congo red. Each ascus normally holds eight colourless ascospores arranged in a single row. The spores are ellipsoid to short-cylindrical, divided by a thick median wall into two almost equal halves; occasionally one or two additional thin walls form. Their outer coat (epispore) is covered in tiny wart-like bumps that give a rough appearance in water mounts but disappear when treated with KOH. Asexual propagation occurs in immersed pycnidia that release simple, colourless, ellipsoidal conidia. No secondary lichen products have been detected in the genus, so field recognition depends chiefly on the pale, immersed thallus, the KOH-negative black perithecia, and the minutely warted, two-celled spores arranged in a single file within each ascus.

== Species ==
As of June 2025, Species Fungorum (in the Catalogue of Life) accepts nine species of Acrocordia:

- Acrocordia cavata (Ach.) R.C.Harris (1974)
- Acrocordia conoidea (Fr.) Körb. (1855)
- Acrocordia endobrya (Döbbeler & Poelt) Lücking & Aptroot (2020)
- Acrocordia garovaglii A.Massal. (1854)
- Acrocordia gemmata (Ach.) A.Massal. (1854)
- Acrocordia macrospora A.Massal. (1855)
- Acrocordia megalospora (Fink) R.C.Harris (1987)
- Acrocordia salweyi (Leight. ex Nyl.) A.L.Sm. (1911)
- Acrocordia subglobosa (Vězda) Poelt & Vězda (1977)
