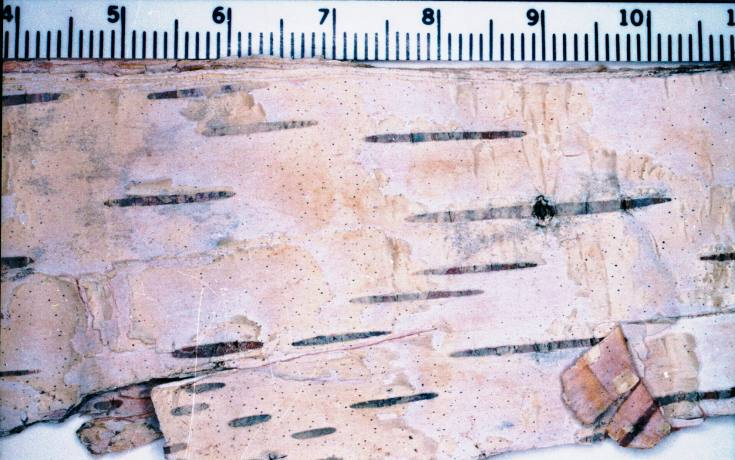
- Leptorhaphis epidermidis, the birchbark dot lichen

Scientific classification
- Kingdom: Fungi
- Division: Ascomycota
- Class: Dothideomycetes
- Order: Pleosporales
- Family: Naetrocymbaceae; Höhnel ex R.C.Harris (1995)

Type genus
- Naetrocymbe Körb. ex. Körb. (1865)

Genera
- Bifrontia; Jarxia; Leptorhaphis; Naetrocymbe; Sporoschizon; Tomasellia

= Naetrocymbaceae =

Family of fungi

The Naetrocymbaceae are a family of fungi in the order Pleosporales. Some members of the type genus, Naetrocymbe, form lichens.

== Description ==
Members of the Naetrocymbaceae typically form a thin, crust-like thallus that adheres directly to the substrate. Many species are purely saprotrophic, living on decaying plant material, but some form a loose partnership with filamentous green algae of the genus Trentepohlia. Because this photobiont is optional, the thallus is often poorly developed and may be entirely absent, leaving only the reproductive structures visible on wood, bark, or other organic debris.

Sexual fruit bodies are perithecia—minute, flask-shaped chambers with a broad opening (ostioles) that may sit on top of the structure or off to one side. They occur singly, in small groups, or as multiple cavities (locules) embedded in a shared stromatic tissue. Individual perithecia are black, more or less spherical or sometimes flattened on one side, and have walls built from tightly packed, brick-like cells. An outer carbonised cap (involucrellum) is either missing or poorly developed. Inside, the cavity is threaded by numerous narrow pseudoparaphyses: short-celled, filamentous strands that branch and fuse to form a loose network. The spore sacs (asci) are club- to pear-shaped, split along their length when mature (fissitunicate), and lack the lens-like ocular chamber seen in many other flask fungi. Each ascus releases colourless to brown ascospores that are spindle- to needle-shaped, divided by several cross-walls (septa), and often bear a finely ornamented surface; these spores do not stain blue in iodine tests.

Asexual reproduction proceeds in pycnidia—smaller flask structures that generate simple, rod-shaped conidia. No secondary metabolites (lichen products) have been detected in the family.

== Ecology ==
Ecologically, Naetrocymbaceae species bridge several lifestyles: most are decomposers, a few form opportunistic lichen associations, and some grow as harmless parasites on established lichens (lichenicolous).

== Genera ==
- Bifrontia Norman (1872) – 2 spp.
- Jarxia D.Hawksw. (1989) – 2 spp.
- Leptorhaphis Körb. (1855) – 8 spp.
- Naetrocymbe Körb. (1865) – 21 spp.
- Sporoschizon Riedl (1960) – 1 sp.
- Tomasellia A.Massal. (1856) – 7 spp.
