= Constrictolumina cinchonae =

Scientific classification
- Kingdom: Fungi
- Division: Ascomycota
- Class: Dothideomycetes
- Order: Trypetheliales
- Family: Trypetheliaceae
- Genus: Constrictolumina
- Species: C. cinchonae

Binomial name
- Constrictolumina cinchonae (Ach.) Lücking, M.P.Nelsen & Aptroot (2016)

Synonyms
- List: Verrucaria cinchonae Ach. (1814); Spermatodium cinchonae (Ach.) Trevis. (1860); Pyrenula cinchonae (Ach.) Tuck. (1868); Arthopyrenia cinchonae (Ach.) Müll.Arg. (1883); Didymella cinchonae (Ach.) Vain. (1909); Leiophloea cinchonae (Ach.) Riedl (1964); Verrucaria prostans Mont. (1843); Verrucaria alboatra var. detergens Nyl. (1869); Verrucaria concamerata Stirt. (1881); Arthopyrenia nieteriana Müll.Arg. (1883); Arthopyrenia planipes Müll.Arg. (1890)

Species of lichen

Constrictolumina cinchonae is a species of corticolous (bark-dwelling) crustose lichen in the family Trypetheliaceae. This widespread tropical lichen forms thin, whitish crusts on tree bark and produces small, hemispherical fruiting bodies that are often surrounded by distinctive grey rings. It has a pantropical distribution, being found across warm, humid regions of the Americas, Africa, and Asia, making it one of the most widely distributed members of its genus. The species was originally discovered growing on cinchona bark, which is reflected in its scientific name.

== Taxonomy ==
Constrictolumina cinchonae was first described in 1814 by Erik Acharius as Verrucaria cinchonae, based on material collected from the bark of Cinchona officinalis. It was subsequently transferred to Arthopyrenia by Johannes Müller Argoviensis in 1883. In 2016, Robert Lücking and colleagues reclassified the species in the genus Constrictolumina, where it is currently recognized. The holotype is preserved in Acharius's herbarium in Helsinki (H-ACH 781B).

Several other names are now regarded as synonyms of this species. These include Verrucaria prostans, described by Camille Montagne in 1843 from French Guiana; Verrucaria alboatra var. detergens, described by William Nylander in 1869 from Rio de Janeiro, Brazil; and Verrucaria concamerata, described by James Stirton in 1881 from Assam, India, later transferred to Porina by Zahlbruckner. Two further synonyms introduced by Müller Argoviensis are Arthopyrenia nieteriana (1883, from Sri Lanka) and Arthopyrenia planipes (1890, from Kenya). All are now treated as belonging to Constrictolumina cinchonae.

== Description ==
Constrictolumina cinchonae has a thin, whitish thallus. Its fruiting bodies (ascomata) are solitary, 0.4–0.6 mm across, and range from partly immersed to raised above the surface. They are hemispherical to somewhat flattened, with apical openings, and are often surrounded by a distinct grey ring. The ascomatal wall is absent below.

The asci are usually narrowly obovate, sometimes nearly cylindrical, and measure (85–)100–125 by 17–22 micrometres (μm). Each ascus contains 4–8 ascospores arranged in two overlapping rows or sometimes nearly in a single line. The ascospores are narrowly egg-shaped, divided by a single septum, and the lower cell may occasionally show a slight constriction in the middle. They have a well-developed perispore and measure 20–30 by 7–11 μm.

Asexual reproductive structures (pycnidia) are often present. These produce rod-shaped conidia about 4–5 by 1 μm. Both the thallus and ascomata give negative reactions in standard chemical spot tests (UV and K), and thin-layer chromatography has not detected any secondary metabolites.

== Habitat and distribution ==
Constrictolumina cinchonae has a pantropical distribution, occurring across the Americas, Africa, and Asia. In the Western Hemisphere it has been reported from the United States, Mexico, Bermuda, the Bahamas, Cuba, Puerto Rico, Dominica, French Guiana, Ecuador, Brazil, and Argentina. In the Old World it is known from Kenya, the Maldives, India, Sri Lanka, China, Indonesia (Java), the Philippines, Papua New Guinea, and Japan. It typically grows on bark in warm, humid environments characteristic of tropical and subtropical regions.
