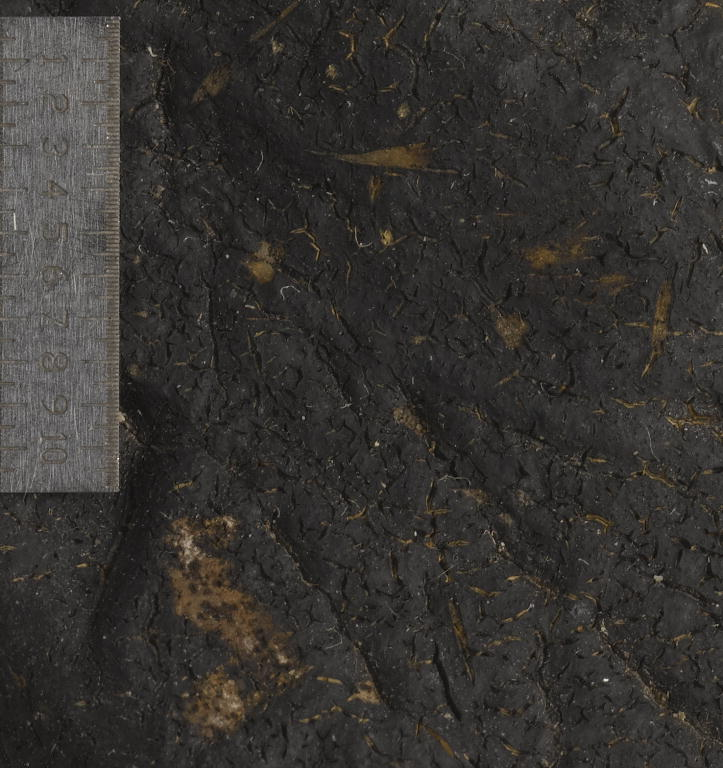
- Herbarium specimen of Stigmidium marinum, preserved by Richard Deakin in 1854

Scientific classification
- Kingdom: Fungi
- Division: Ascomycota
- Class: Dothideomycetes
- Order: Capnodiales
- Family: Mycosphaerellaceae
- Genus: Stigmidium; Trevis. (1860)

Type species
- Stigmidium schaereri (A.Massal.) Trevis. (1860)

Species
- See text

Synonyms
- Epicymatia Fuckel (1870); Mycophycias Kohlm. & Volkm.-Kohlm. (1998); Pharcidia Körb. (1865); Pharcidiopsis Sacc. & D.Sacc. (1905); Scutomyces J.L.Bezerra & Cavalc. (1972)

= Stigmidium =

Genus of fungi

Stigmidium is a genus of lichenicolous (lichen-dwelling) fungi in the family Mycosphaerellaceae.

== Taxonomy ==
The genus was circumscribed by Italian botanist Vittore Benedetto Antonio Trevisan de Saint-Léon in 1860, with Stigmidium schaereri assigned as the type species.

== Description ==
Stigmidium species are minute, mostly lichen-dwelling fungi that usually lack a visible body (thallus). Most live embedded in the tissues of their host lichens, though one species appears genuinely lichenised (forming a partnership with green algae of the genus Dilabifilum) and a few are parasites of brown algae. Their vegetative filaments (hyphae) are branched, pale to light brown, and consist of elongate cells that are mostly immersed within the host; compact tissue masses (stromata) are not formed.

The ascospore-producing structures are tiny, dark, flask-shaped perithecia with short necks and thick, melanised walls. They develop within the host thallus and may later break through the surface (erumpent). Stiff hairs (setae) are absent, but some species show small hyphal outgrowths or grow within a mat of surface mycelium. Inside the perithecium, the sterile tissue (the hamathecium) is variable and made up of narrow pseudoparaphyses that are often poorly developed and frequently break down as the spores mature; in some species, the pore (ostiole) is lined by short filaments called periphysoids.

The spore sacs (asci) are few in number, club- to sack-shaped, thick-walled, and fissitunicate (the wall splits into layers to release the spores). They lack a differentiated tip structure, do not stain blue in iodine, and usually contain eight ascospores. The spores are arranged in two rows, cylindrical to club-shaped or ellipsoidal, thin- and smooth-walled, usually colourless but sometimes browning late in development. They are typically 1-septate (rarely with three septa), and each cell often contains two oil droplets (guttules), which can give the illusion of additional cross-walls; no outer gelatinous coat (perispore) is present. Asexual states (anamorphs) are unknown for most species, and no secondary metabolites (lichen products) have been reported.

== Species ==
- Stigmidium acetabuli Calat. & Triebel (2001)
- Stigmidium aggregatum (Mudd) D.Hawksw. (1975)
- Stigmidium ahtii Etayo & Palice (2017)
- Stigmidium alectoriae Linds. ex Etayo (2008)
- Stigmidium allogenum (Nyl.) D.Hawksw. (1975)
- Stigmidium apophlaeae (Kohlm.) Aptroot (2006)
- Stigmidium arthoniae (Arnold) Hafellner (1994)
- Stigmidium arthrorhaphidis Hafellner & Obermayer (1995)
- Stigmidium ascophylli (Cotton) Aptroot (2006)
- Stigmidium aspiciliae (J.Lahm) Cl.Roux (2014)
- Stigmidium bellemerei Cl.Roux & Nav.-Ros. (1998)
- Stigmidium beringicum Zhurb. & Triebel (2008)
- Stigmidium buelliae Zhurb. & Himelbr. (2012)
- Stigmidium californicum K.Knudsen & Kocourk. (2010)
- Stigmidium calopadiae Matzer (1996)
- Stigmidium caloplacae Alstrup & Olech (1996)
- Stigmidium cartilagineae Calat. & Triebel (2003)
- Stigmidium catapyrenii Cl.Roux & Triebel (1994)
- Stigmidium cerinae Cl.Roux & Triebel (1994)
- Stigmidium cladoniicola Zhurb. & Diederich (2008)
- Stigmidium clauzadei Cl.Roux & Nav.-Ros. (1994)
- Stigmidium coarctatae S.Y.Kondr., Lőkös & Hur (2016)
- Stigmidium collematis Cl.Roux & Triebel (1994)
- Stigmidium concentricum (J.L.Bezerra & Cavalc.) Lücking (2006)
- Stigmidium congestum (Körb.) Triebel (1991)
- Stigmidium croceae (Arnold) Cl.Roux & Triebel (1994)
- Stigmidium cupulare (Pat.) D.Hawksw. (2003)
- Stigmidium degelii R.Sant. (1993)
- Stigmidium disconephromeum Etayo (2008)
- Stigmidium ephebes (Henssen) D.Hawksw. (1975)
- Stigmidium epinesolechia Etayo (2017)
- Stigmidium epiphyllum Matzer (1996)
- Stigmidium epiramalina (Vouaux) Hafellner (1994)
- Stigmidium epistigmellum (Nyl. ex Vouaux) Kocourk. & K.Knudsen (2009)
- Stigmidium epixanthum Hafellner (2002)
- Stigmidium eucline (Nyl.) Vězda (1970)
- Stigmidium exasperatum Etayo (2010)
- Stigmidium frigidum (Th.Fr. ex Sacc.) Alstrup & D.Hawksw. (1990)
- Stigmidium fuscatae (Arnold) R.Sant. (1988)
- Stigmidium glebarum (Arnold) Hafellner (1987)
- Stigmidium grex Alstrup & Olech (1996)
- Stigmidium gyrophorarum (Arnold) D.Hawksw. (1975)
- Stigmidium haesitans (Nyl.) Diederich (2018)
- Stigmidium hageniae (Rehm) Hafellner (1988)
- Stigmidium hesperium Kocourk., K.Knudsen & Diederich (2009)
- Stigmidium heterodermiae Etayo (2002)
- Stigmidium humidum Pérez-Ort., Halıcı & K.Knudsen (2010)
- Stigmidium hypotrachynicola Etayo (2017)
- Stigmidium joergensenii R.Sant. (1989)
- Stigmidium johnii Halıcı & D.Hawksw. (2007)
- Stigmidium kashiwadanii Zhurbenko (2019)
- Stigmidium lecidellae Triebel, Cl.Roux & Le Coeur (1995)
- Stigmidium lendemeri Kocourk. & K.Knudsen (2013)
- Stigmidium leprariae Zhurb. (2007)
- Stigmidium leptogii Etayo (2002)
- Stigmidium lichenum (Arnold) Triebel & P.Scholz (2001)
- Stigmidium lobariae Zhurb. & Etayo (2012)
- Stigmidium marinum (Deakin) Swinscow (1965)
- Stigmidium mayrhoferi Er.Zimm. & F.Berger (2018)
- Stigmidium micareae van den Boom (2016)
- Stigmidium microcarpum Alstrup & J.C.David (1993)
- Stigmidium microspilum (Körb.) D.Hawksw. (1975)
- Stigmidium microsporum Etayo & Osorio (2004)
- Stigmidium mitchellii Cl.Roux & Bricaud (1994)
- Stigmidium mycobilimbiae Cl.Roux, Triebel & Etayo (1994)
- Stigmidium neofusceliae Calat. & Triebel (1999)
- Stigmidium parasiticum (G.Winter) Aptroot (2006)
- Stigmidium parmotrematis F.Berger & E.Zimm. (2016)
- Stigmidium parvum (Henssen) Diederich (2018)
- Stigmidium peltideae (Vain.) R.Sant. (1960)
- Stigmidium petri Hafellner (2008)
- Stigmidium phyllobaeidis Zhurb., Etayo & Flakus (2020)
- Stigmidium placopsidis E.Zimm. & F.Berger (2016)
- Stigmidium placynthii Cl.Roux & Nav.-Ros. (1994)
- Stigmidium porinae Matzer (1996)
- Stigmidium pseudopeltideae Cl.Roux & Triebel (2003)
- Stigmidium pseudosquamariae Zhurb. (2024)
- Stigmidium pumilum (Lettau) Matzer & Hafellner (1990)
- Stigmidium punctillum (Arnold) D.Hawksw. (1975)
- Stigmidium ramalinae (Müll.Arg.) Etayo & Diederich (2004)
- Stigmidium rivulorum (Kernst.) Cl.Roux & Nav.-Ros. (1994)
- Stigmidium rouxianum Calat. & Triebel (2003)
- Stigmidium schaereri (A.Massal.) Trevis. (1860)
- Stigmidium schizosporum Matzer (1996)
- Stigmidium seirophorae Etayo & van den Boom (2017)
- Stigmidium solorinarium (Vain.) D.Hawksw. (1983)
- Stigmidium spegazzinii Etayo (2008)
- Stigmidium squamariae (B.de Lesd.) Cl.Roux & Triebel (1994)
- Stigmidium squamarinicola Calat. & Triebel (2003)
- Stigmidium stereocaulorum Zhurb. & Triebel (2008)
- Stigmidium stygnospilum (Minks) R.Sant. (1960)
- Stigmidium subcladoniicola van den Boom (2016)
- Stigmidium superpositum (Nyl.) D.Hawksw. (1975)
- Stigmidium tabacinae (Arnold) Triebel (1989)
- Stigmidium tetrasporum Etayo (1994)
- Stigmidium trichotheliorum Matzer (1996)
- Stigmidium triebelae Etayo (2000)
- Stigmidium vezdae Matzer (1996)
- Stigmidium xanthoparmeliarum Hafellner (1994)
