= Constrictolumina esenbeckiana =

Scientific classification
- Kingdom: Fungi
- Division: Ascomycota
- Class: Dothideomycetes
- Order: Trypetheliales
- Family: Trypetheliaceae
- Genus: Constrictolumina
- Species: C. esenbeckiana

Binomial name
- Constrictolumina esenbeckiana (Fée) Lücking, M.P.Nelsen & Aptroot (2016)

Synonyms
- Melanotheca esenbeckiana Fée (1837); Melaspilea esenbeckiana (Fée) Nyl. (1858); Mycoporum esenbeckianum (Fée) Trevis. (1861); Tomasellia esenbeckiana (Fée) Müll.Arg. (1888); Arthopyrenia esenbeckiana (Fée) R.C.Harris (1995)

Species of lichen

Constrictolumina esenbeckiana is a species of corticolous (bark-dwelling) crustose lichen in the family Trypetheliaceae. This neotropical lichen forms thin, whitish crusts on tree bark and produces small, hemispherical fruiting bodies that often occur in dense clusters of 5–20 individuals that may fuse together sideways. It is known from the Caribbean Antilles and Brazil, where it grows in tropical habitats, though most records are historical.

== Taxonomy ==
Constrictolumina esenbeckiana was first described in 1837 by Antoine Laurent Apollinaire Fée as Melanotheca esenbeckiana, based on material from the Antilles collected on the bark of Exostema. Johannes Müller Argoviensis later transferred the species to Tomasellia in 1883. In 2016, Robert Lücking, Matthew Nelsen, and André Aptroot reclassified it in the genus Constrictolumina, where it is currently accepted. The lectotype, designated by Richard Harris in 1995, is housed in the Geneva herbarium (G).

== Description ==
Constrictolumina esenbeckiana has a thin, whitish thallus. Its fruiting bodies (ascomata) are solitary, 0.4–0.6 mm in diameter, and range from partly immersed to distinctly raised above the surface. They are hemispherical to somewhat flattened, with apical openings, and frequently occur in dense groups of 5–20, where they may fuse sideways. The ascomatal wall is absent on the underside.

The asci are usually narrowly obovate, sometimes nearly cylindrical, and measure about 100–125 by 17–22 micrometres (μm). Each ascus contains 4–8 ascospores, arranged in two rows, overlapping rows, or nearly in a single line. The ascospores are narrowly egg-shaped, divided by a single cross-wall, and the lower cell may occasionally show a slight constriction. They measure 22–27 by 7–10 μm, with a well-developed outer layer (perispore).

Asexual reproductive structures (pycnidia) are often present, producing rod-shaped conidia about 4–5 by 1 μm. Both the thallus and ascomata test negative in standard chemical spot tests (UV and K), and thin-layer chromatography has not detected any secondary metabolites.

== Habitat and distribution ==
Constrictolumina esenbeckiana is a neotropical species known from the Antilles and Brazil. Most records are historical, but the lichen has also been documented more recently in Sergipe state, Brazil. It typically grows on bark in tropical habitats.
