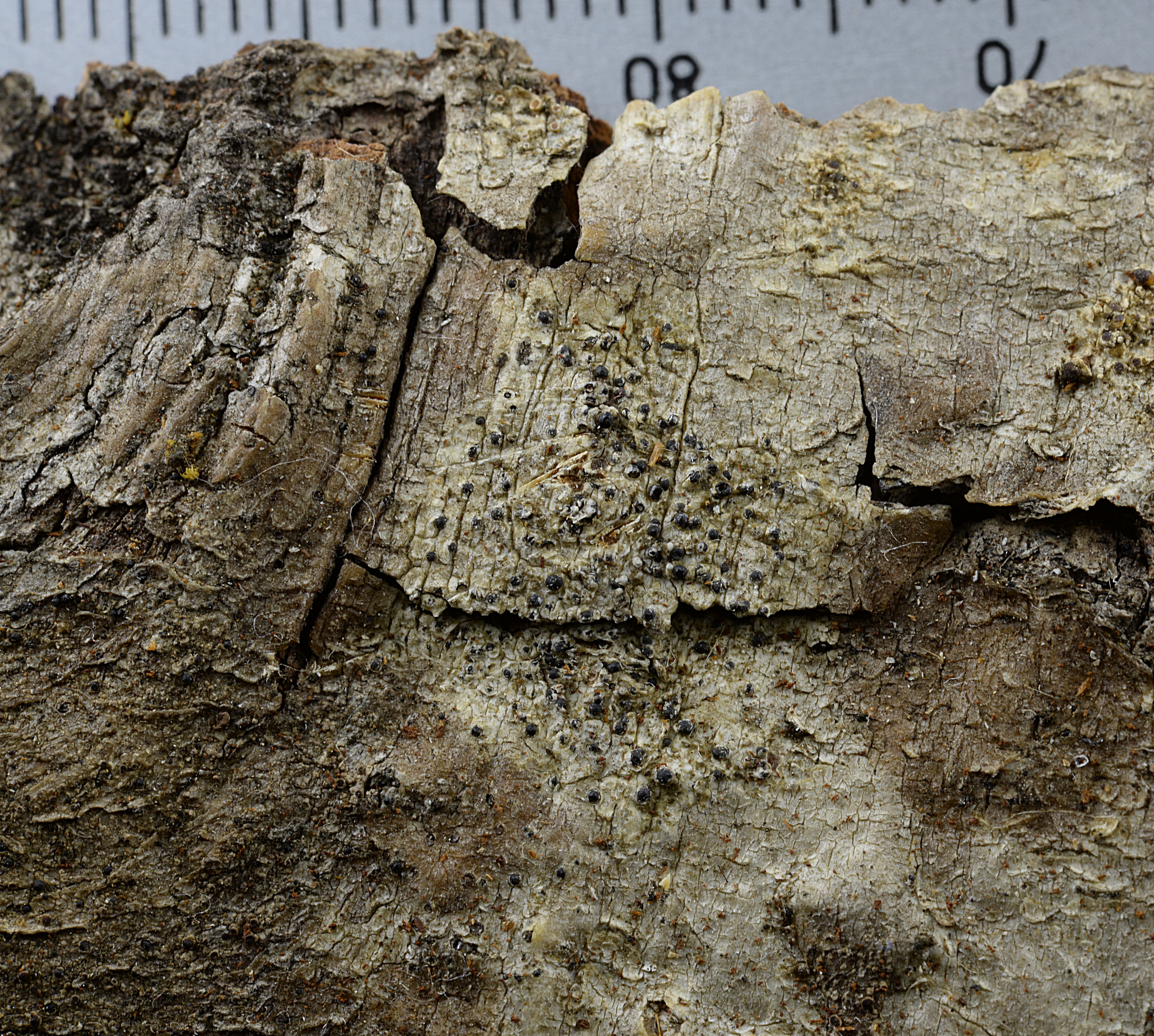

Scientific classification
- Kingdom: Fungi
- Division: Ascomycota
- Class: Dothideomycetes
- Order: Monoblastiales
- Family: Monoblastiaceae
- Genus: Acrocordia
- Species: A. cavata

Binomial name
- Acrocordia cavata (Ach.) R.C.Harris (1974)

Synonyms
- Verrucaria cavata Ach. (1814); Sphaeria cavata (Ach.) Nyl. (1859); Amphisphaeria cavata (Ach.) Ces. & De Not. (1863); Arthopyrenia cavata (Ach.) R.C.Harris (1973)

= Acrocordia cavata =

Species of lichen

Acrocordia cavata is a species of corticolous (bark-dwelling), crustose lichen in the family Monoblastiaceae. It was first formally described in 1814 by the Swedish lichenologist Erik Acharius, who classified it in the genus Verrucaria. The taxon was later proposed for inclusion in the genera Sphaeria, Amphisphaeria, and Arthopyrenia. Richard Harris reclassified it in the genus Acrocordia in 1974.

== Description ==
Acrocordia cavata has an immersed thallus, giving it a grey-white appearance as it grows within the substrate. The perithecia, which are the fruiting bodies of this lichen, are scattered and range in colour from dark brown to black, sometimes appearing somewhat shiny. These perithecia are hemispherical and partially immersed in the thallus, measuring 0.3 to 0.6 mm in diameter.

The involucrellum, a protective layer surrounding the perithecia, is entirely brown and contains bark cells in its upper part, while mostly colourless in the lower part, measuring 60 to 80 micrometers (μm) thick above and thinner below. The hymenium, a spore-bearing tissue, does not react to iodine (I–). The paraphyses, sterile filaments among the asci, are narrow (about 1 μm thick), not distinctly septate, and exhibit branching and anastomosis (fusion between branches).

The asci are cylindrical, featuring an obvious somewhat spherical indentation on the inner wall, and measure 80 to 115 μm in length and 9 to 10 μm in width, typically containing eight spores. The ascospores are arranged in a single row (uniseriately), are colourless, and vary from cylindrical with rounded ends to somewhat ellipsoidal. They are 1-septate, usually not constricted at the median septum, and have walls adorned with minute warts, measuring 11 to 16.5 μm in length and 6 to 9.5 μm in width. Pycnidia, another type of spore-producing structure, are not known to occur this species.
