= Stigmidium eucline =

Scientific classification
- Kingdom: Fungi
- Division: Ascomycota
- Class: Dothideomycetes
- Order: Mycosphaerellales
- Family: Mycosphaerellaceae
- Genus: Stigmidium
- Species: S. eucline

Binomial name
- Stigmidium eucline (Nyl.) Vězda (1970)

Synonyms
- Cyrtidula euclinis (Nyl.) Minks (1891); Mycoporum eucline Nyl. (1874)

Species of fungi

Stigmidium eucline is a species of lichenicolous fungus in the family Mycosphaerellaceae. It grows on Varicellaria lactea.
