= Gunnar Degelius =

Swedish lichenologist

- Degelius in June, 1969
- Born: 27 January 1903; Uppsala
- Died: 22 July 1993 (aged 90); Askim, Sweden
- Education: Uppsala University
- Awards: Acharius Medal (1992)
- Scientific career
- Fields: Lichenology
- Workplaces: Gothenburg Botanical Garden; University of Gothenburg
- Author abbrev. (botany): Degel. G.B.F.Nilsson

Gunnar Bror Fritiof Degelius (né Nilsson until 1932; 27 January 1903 – 22 July 1993) was a Swedish lichenologist. Between the publications of his first and final scientific papers, Degelius had a 70-year-long research career. While he was best known for his expertise on the lichen genus Collema, he also wrote important papers on lichen biology and ecology, floristic studies of the Nordic countries and various other areas around the world, and lichen succession. Degelius described 124 new taxa (mostly species), and published about 130 scientific papers. In 1992 he was one of the first to be awarded the Acharius Medal for his lifetime contributions to lichenology. Fifteen species and three genera have been named in honour of Degelius.

== Early life and education ==
Born in Uppsala on 27 January 1903, Degelius spent much of his youth in Mariestad. He was introduced to botany at an early age by his father, Bror Nilsson, who was a pharmacist. By the age of six, Gunnar had a sizeable collection of seed plants, and he collected his first lichen – the dog lichen, Peltigera canina – at age 12. After his family moved to Gothenburg, he met the lichenologists Captain Carl Stenholm and Adolf Hugo Magnusson, both of whom encouraged his early interest in lichens. Degelius attended school with Carl H. Lindroth, who later became a notable entomologist. They shared an early interest in natural history, and they would often go on trips together to collect plants, beetles, and lichens in Mölndal, south of Gothenburg.

Degelius matriculated in 1923, the same year he published his first scientific paper (under the name Nilsson) on the lichen Arthonia spadicea. Soon after he began studies at Uppsala University. His professor of systematic botany became aware of Degelius because of his tendency to frequently miss lectures; after he called him into his office for an explanation, it became evident that Degelius already knew the subject matter quite well, having essentially memorized the textbook used for the course, Eduard Strasburger's Lehrbuch der Botanik. Degelius obtained a filosofie kandidat degree in 1927, a filosofie magister in 1929, and a filosofie licentiat in 1933. It was at Uppsala university that Degelius associated with the professor Rutger Sernander at the Växtbiologiska Institutionen (Institute of Botany), from where he graduated in 1935 with a dissertation titled Das ozeanische Element der Strauch-und Laubflechtenflora von Skandinavien ("The oceanic element of the shrub and lichen flora of Scandinavia").

== Career ==
From 1935 until 1961, Degelius was a docent (an academic appointment below the rank of Professor) in botany at Uppsala University. He worked under the supervision of Professor Gustaf Einar Du Rietz, along with Sten Ahlner, Torsten Hasselrot, and Rolf Santesson – all of whom became notable lichenologists. During this time, Degelius travelled (often with Ahlner and Hasselrot, at least initially) to many locations in Scandinavia to collect lichens. In 1939, he visited the United States and subsequently published two papers on the lichens of Maine, and the lichens of the Great Smoky Mountains of Tennessee, both of which were highly regarded by later researchers. He has been credited for having introduced the lichen terms hormocyst and hormocystangium in a 1945 publication, referring to previously undescribed asexual propagules he had observed on the lichen Lempholemma cladodes.

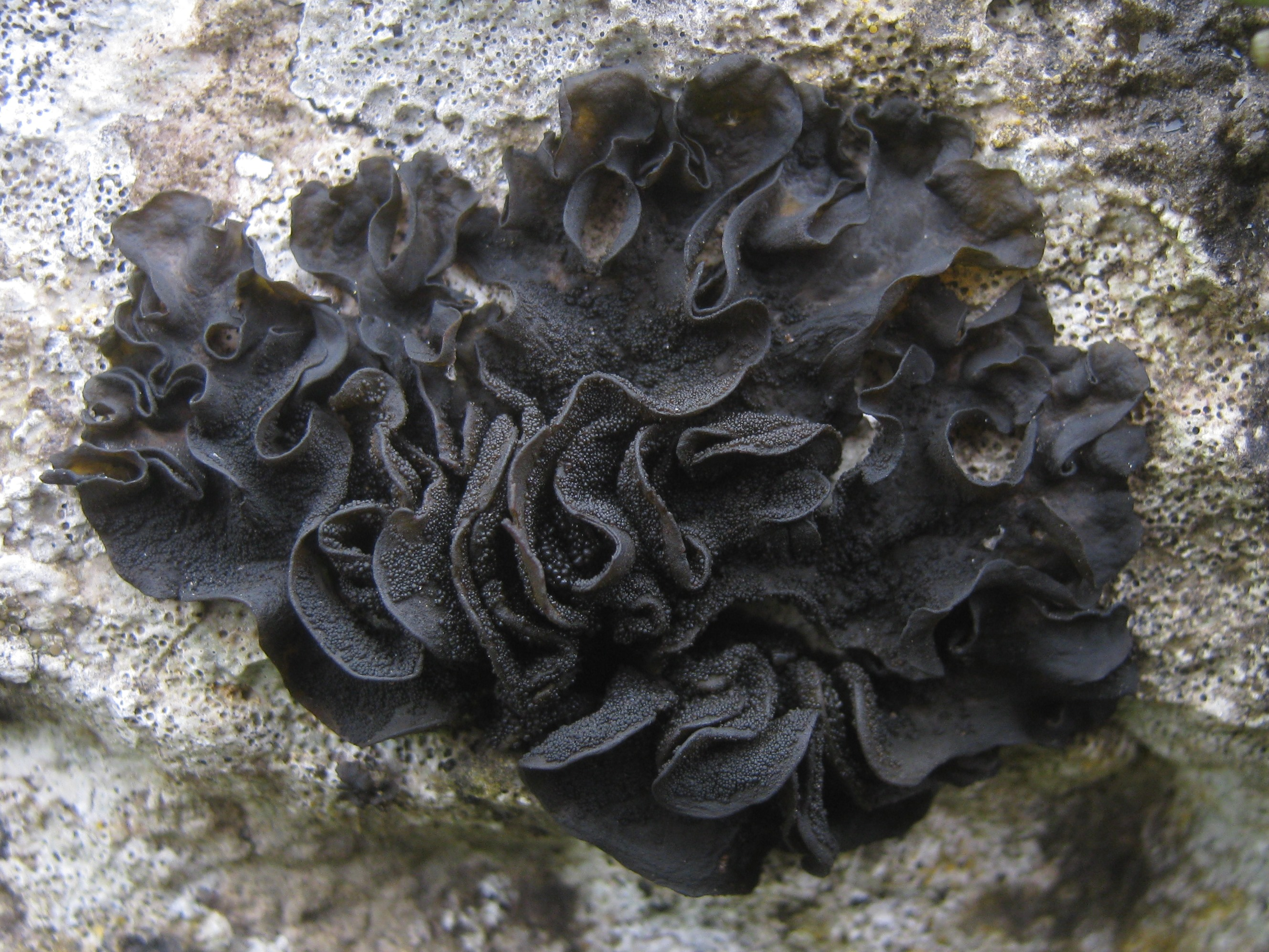
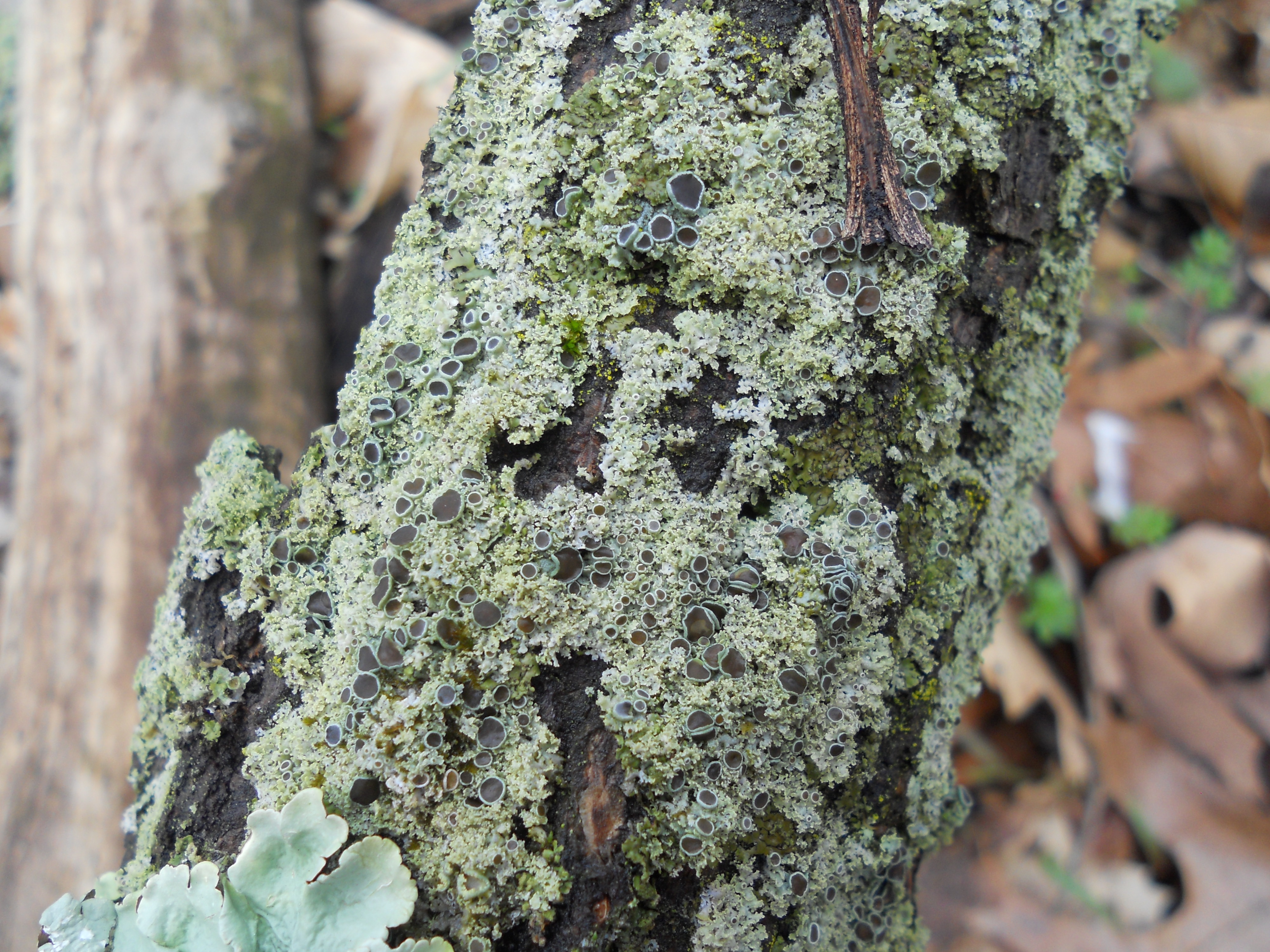
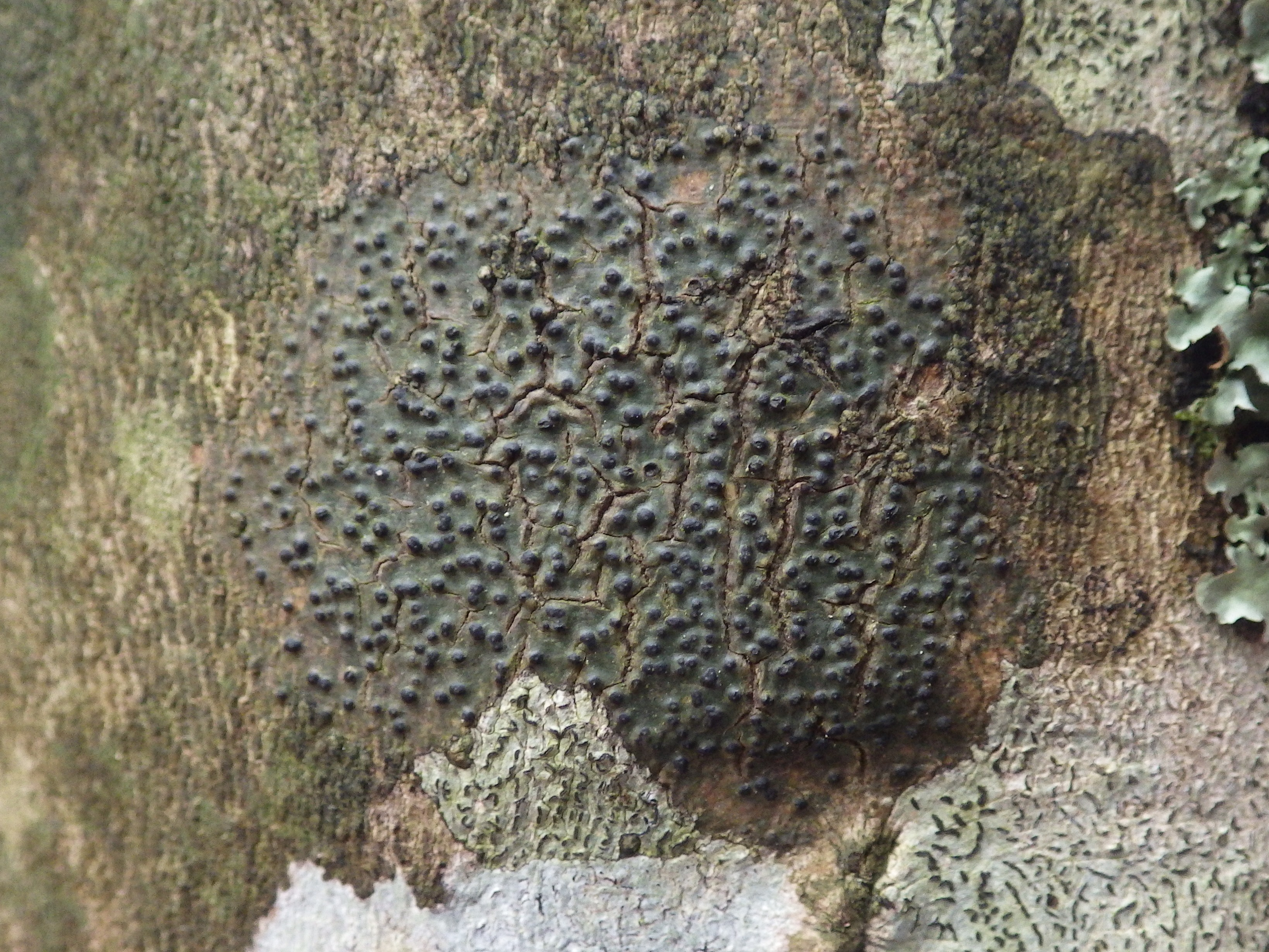
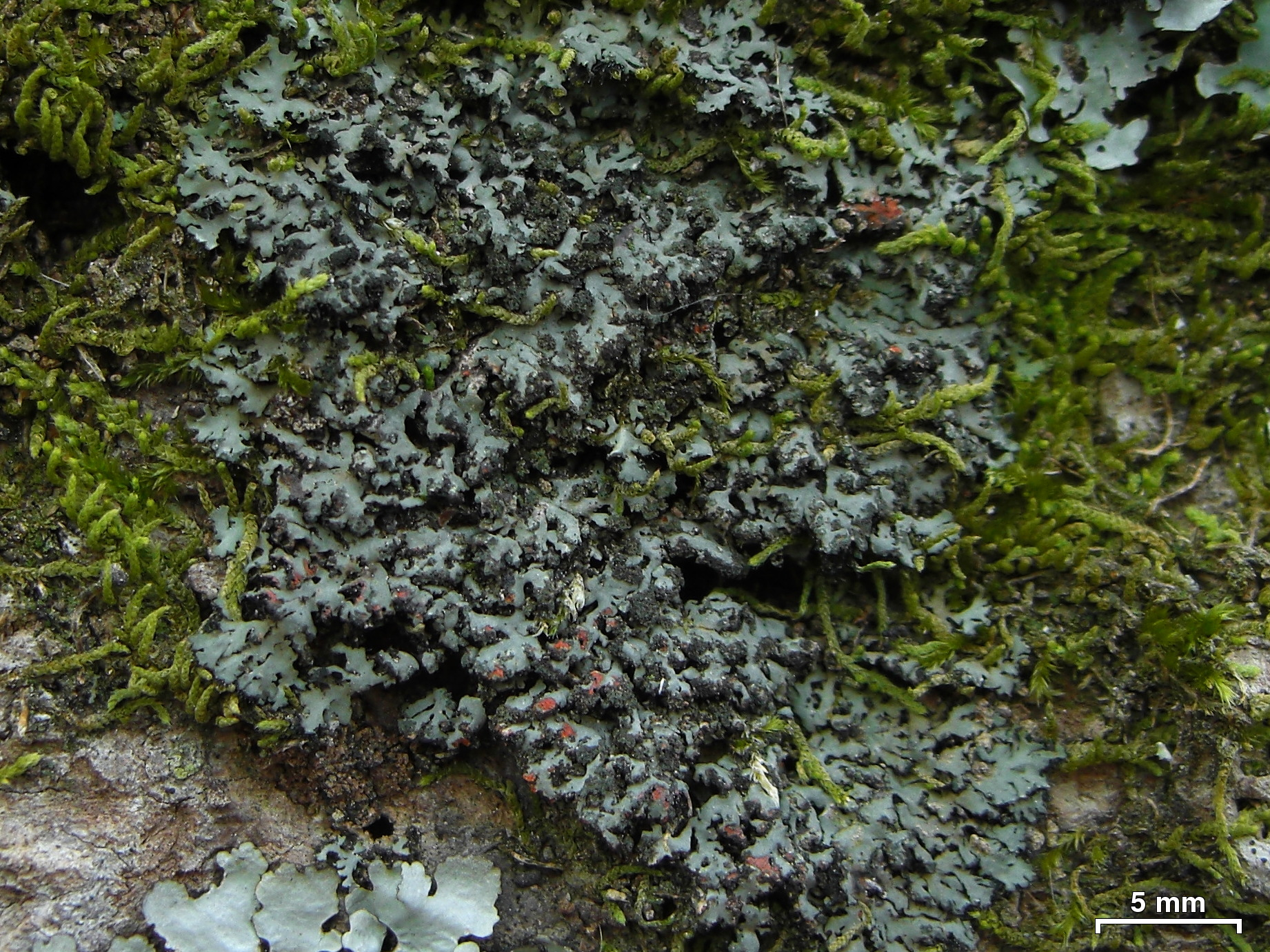
Some lichens first formally described by Degelius (clockwise from upper left): Collema subflaccidum, Physcia millegrana, Phaeophyscia rubropulchra, and Pyrenula macrospora.

Degelius returned to Gothenburg in 1955 to take a position at the Gothenburg Botanical Garden. Degelius also lectured about the subject of systematic botany at the University of Gothenburg until his retirement in 1969.

After his retirement, Degelius travelled the world, visiting exotic locations on several continents to continue his lichen studies. He collected his last lichen in Estonia in 1991. His private herbarium, which had accumulated more than 50,000 specimens, is now housed at Uppsala University. He described 124 new taxa (mostly species), and published about 130 scientific papers. Although most of these were about lichens, he also published papers on phanerogams, mosses, and non-lichenized fungi. Degelius was also interested in studies on floristics, publishing floras for several Nordic locales as well as other more distant locations. Lichen biology and ecology was another interest, and he published research on the competition between rock-dwelling lichens, discovered a type of diaspore called a lichenized hormocyst, and studied the ecological succession of lichens growing on Fraxinus twigs.

Degelius is best known for his work on the genus Collema. His first publication on this group appeared in 1936. In 1954 he published a monograph of the European species, and then 20 years later, a world monograph. Degelius won a Linnean Medal for this work.

== Personal life ==
In her obituary of Degelius, Polish lichenologist Jolanta Miądlikowska described him as belonging "to the group of scholars who are appreciated not only for their knowledge and scientific achievements, but also for 'humanity'". Degelius was described by former student Lars Arvidsson as generous and helpful with his students and colleagues, who often visited his home in Askim (a district of Gothenburg) and made use of his expansive library. He was frequently consulted for assistance with nomenclatural issues or with translating Latin diagnoses. Degelius prided himself on accuracy, and complained about the carelessness of the Latin written by younger colleagues. A former student, Ingvar Kärnefelt, recalled his typical professorial appearance: "Gunnar usually appeared in his slightly old-fashioned "uniform", i.e. a simple blue club blazer, grey trousers, brown and less well matching shoes. He also generally wore Kissinger-style spectacles."

For the final 30 years of his life, Degelius lived in a villa in Askim, with his sister and brother-in-law. He had a lichenological library comprising more than 45 metres (148 ft) of shelf space, including original classic works by Carl Linnaeus, Erik Acharius, Elias Magnus Fries, and others. This collection is now kept at the Department of Systematic Botany at Uppsala University. The New Zealander botanist David Galloway, who attended a class of Degelius' in the 1960s, recalled the atmosphere at one of the frequent gatherings there: "Very many will remember the warmly convivial discussion in the spacious book-lined sitting room with candles lit, a bottle of port or punch open on the table, and the cigars circulating. It was a warmly welcoming and special ambience which was very much part of Gunnar ... the celebrated photograph albums of past and present lichenologists would be produced, recent publications would be discussed, minutes would fly past into hours and by midnight when the guests were wilting, Gunnar would just be getting into his stride."

Degelius died in Askim on 22 July 1993. At his funeral, a specimen of Degelia atlantica was placed on his coffin by the Norwegian lichenologist Per Magnus Jørgensen.

== Recognition ==
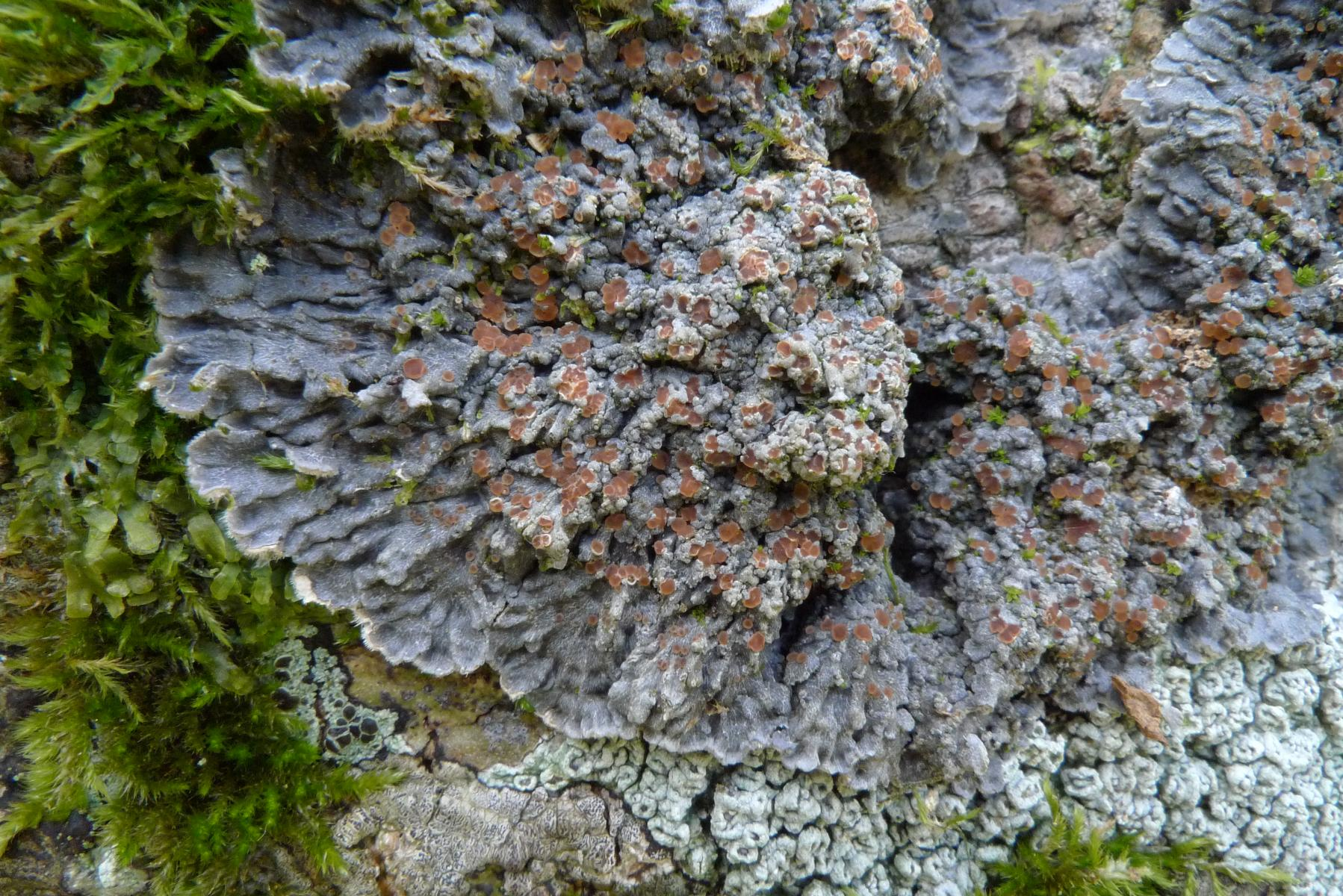
Degelia plumbea, a species in one of the genera named for Degelius

Degelius was among the first recipients of the Acharius Medal in 1992, awarded for his lifetime achievements in lichenology. He was elected an honorary member of the British Lichen Society in 1976. An issue of the scientific journal The Lichenologist was dedicated to him in 1983 on the occasion of his 80th birthday, and an issue of the journal Graphis Scripta (named for a species of lichen) was dedicated to him for his 90th birthday in 1993.

=== Eponymy ===
Three genera have been named to honour Gunnar Degelius: Degelia Arv. & D.J.Galloway (1981); Degeliella P.M.Jørg. (2004); and Gudelia Henssen (1995). Degelius has also had several species named after him, including: Arthopyrenia degelii R.C.Harris (1995); Carbonea degelii Alstrup (1994); Chaenotheca degelii Tibell (1983); Lecanora degelii T.Schauer & Brodo (1966); Lecanora gunnarii Motyka (1996); Lecidea degeliana Hertel (1970); Lempholemma degelianum P.M.Jørg. (1998); Leptogium degelii M.Lindstr. (1993); Parmelia degelii Hale (1964); Pertusaria degelii Erichsen (1939); Pseudocyphellaria degelii D.J.Galloway & P.James (1983); Rinodina degeliana Coppins (1983); Squamarina degelii Poelt (1958); Stigmidium degelii R.Sant. (1993); and Verrucaria degelii R.Sant. (1939).

== Selected works ==
A complete listing of Degelius's scientific publications is given in Arvidsson and Galloway's 1999 bibliography. Some of his major works include the following:

- Degelius, G. (1941). "Contributions to the lichen flora of North America. II. The lichen flora of the Great Smoky Mountains". Arkiv för Botanik. 30A (3): 1–80.
- —————— (1945). "Lichenisierte Hormocysten, ein neuer Diasporen typus der Flechten" [Lichenized hormocysts, a new type of diasporic lichen]. Svensk Botanisk Tidskrift (in German). 39: 419–430.
- —————— (1954). The lichen genus Collema in Europe. Morphology, taxonomy, ecology. Symbolae Botanicae Upsaliensis. Vol. 13. pp. 1–499. ISSN 0082-0644.
- —————— (1964). "Biological studies of the epiphytic vegetation on twigs on Fraxinus excelsior". Acta Horti Gotoburgensis Medd Goteborgs Botany Tradgard. 27: 11–55.
- —————— (1974). Further Studies on the Epiphytic Vegetation on Twigs. Botanica Gothoburgensia. Vol. 7. Göteborg: Acta Universitatis Gothoburgensis.
- —————— (1982). The lichen flora of the island of Vega in Nordland, northern Norway. Acta Regiae Societatis Scientiarum et Litterarum Gothoburgensis., Botanica. Vol. 2. Göteborg: Kungl. vetenskapsoch vitterhets-samhället.
- ——————; Christiansen, M. Skytte (1986). The lichen flora of the island of Anholt, Denmark. Acta Regiae Societatis Scientiarum et Litterarum Gothoburgensis., Botanica. Vol. 3. Göteborg: Kungl. vetenskapsoch vitterhets-samhället.

== See also ==
- Category:Taxa named by Gunnar Degelius
