= Acrocordia gemmata =

Scientific classification
- Kingdom: Fungi
- Division: Ascomycota
- Class: Dothideomycetes
- Order: Monoblastiales
- Family: Monoblastiaceae
- Genus: Acrocordia
- Species: A. gemmata

Binomial name
- Acrocordia gemmata (Ach.) A.Massal., 1854

Synonyms
- Arthopyrenia gemmata (Ach.) A.Massal., 1852 Arthopyrenia alba Arthopyrenia sphaeroides

Species of fungus

Acrocordia gemmata is a species of lichen belonging to the family Monoblastiaceae.

Acrocordia gemmata is characterised by a thin, crustose thallus that ranges in colour from white to pale gray or green, with no hypothallus visible. The perithecia are hemispherical, black and somewhat immersed in the thallus, with an ostiole at the top and long-celled pseudoparaphyses.

The asci are narrowly cylindrical, and have an apical dome with a broad ocular chamber, covered by a hemispherical meniscus-like structure. The asci contain 8 ellipsoid ascopores each (18-30 x 8-12 μm), which are 1-septate and have finely granular perispores. The pycnidia of Acrocordia gemmata are rare and dispersed, measuring 0.1-0.25 mm, with 3-5 x 0.8-1 μm conidia. Its photobiont is Trentepohlia

Acrocordia gemmata is commonly found on the bark of deciduous trees, throughout Europe, Asia, Macaronesia, New Zealand, North America.
