= Stigmidium degelii =

Scientific classification
- Kingdom: Fungi
- Division: Ascomycota
- Class: Dothideomycetes
- Order: Capnodiales
- Family: Mycosphaerellaceae
- Genus: Stigmidium
- Species: S. degelii

Binomial name
- Stigmidium degelii R.Sant. (1993)

Species of lichen

Stigmidium degelii is a species of lichenicolous (lichen-dwelling) fungus in the family Mycosphaerellaceae. It was described as a new species in 1993 by the Swedish lichenologist Rolf Santesson. The type specimen was collected in Hordaland, Norway, in 1932. The species epithet honours Gunnar Degelius, who was the author's "first teacher in lichenology".

The fungus grows on the foliose lichen Degelia plumbea. It does not cause discolouration or gall formation on the host thallus, but produces perithecia (fruiting bodies) that are immersed in the surface layers of the host, with only the dark upper part visible. Stigmidium degelii is known to occur in Sweden, Norway, and Scotland.
