= Stigmidium collematis =

Scientific classification
- Kingdom: Fungi
- Division: Ascomycota
- Class: Dothideomycetes
- Order: Mycosphaerellales
- Family: Mycosphaerellaceae
- Genus: Stigmidium
- Species: S. collematis

Binomial name
- Stigmidium collematis Cl. Roux & Triebel (1994)

Species of fungi

Stigmidium collematis is a species of lichenicolous fungus in the family Mycosphaerellaceae. It grows on Lathagrium undulatum.
