= Arthopyrenia degelii =

Scientific classification
- Kingdom: Fungi
- Division: Ascomycota
- Class: Dothideomycetes
- Order: Trypetheliales
- Family: Trypetheliaceae
- Genus: Arthopyrenia
- Species: A. degelii

Binomial name
- Arthopyrenia degelii R.C.Harris (1995)

Species of lichen in the family Arthopyreniaceae

Arthopyrenia degelii is a species of corticolous lichen in the family Trypetheliaceae. It was formally described as a new species by Richard Clinton Harris in 1995. The type specimens, originally collected in 1939 by Swedish lichenologist Gunnar Degelius (for whom the species is named), were found growing on Hamamelis in the Great Smoky Mountains of Tennessee.

The lichen forms brown, rarely tan, blotches on smooth bark. It has superficial ascomata that are range in shape from hemispherical to flattened, and measuring 0.3–0.5 mm diameter. The asci are narrowly elliptical, measuring 48–60 by 11–13 μm, with 8 biseriate to subbiseriate spores. The ascospores are narrowly elliptical, and 2-celled; either one or both of the cells are constricted near the middle. They typically measure 12–15 by 4–5 μm, with a thin sheath. Microconidia are rod-shaped, measuring 6–8 by 1 μm.
