= Constrictolumina planorbis =

Scientific classification
- Kingdom: Fungi
- Division: Ascomycota
- Class: Dothideomycetes
- Order: Trypetheliales
- Family: Trypetheliaceae
- Genus: Constrictolumina
- Species: C. planorbis

Binomial name
- Constrictolumina planorbis (Ach.) Lücking, M.P.Nelsen & Aptroot (2016)

Synonyms
- List: Verrucaria planorbis Ach. (1814); Sagedia planorbis (Ach.) A.Massal. (1852); Pyrenula planorbis (Ach.) Trevis. (1853); Spermatodium planorbis (Ach.) Trevis. (1860); Arthopyrenia planorbis (Ach.) Müll.Arg. (1888); Arthopyrenia planior Müll.Arg. (1885); Arthopyrenia planorbiculata Müll.Arg. (1885)

Species of lichen

Constrictolumina planorbis is a species of corticolous (bark-dwelling) crustose lichen in the family Trypetheliaceae. This pantropical lichen forms thin, whitish crusts on tree bark and is distinguished by its fruiting bodies that develop broad, shield-like extensions around their openings, giving them a distinctive flattened appearance. It has a wide distribution across tropical regions, being found in North America, the Caribbean, and the Pacific, where it grows in warm, humid environments.

== Taxonomy ==
Constrictolumina planorbis was first described in 1814 by Erik Acharius as Verrucaria planorbis, based on material growing on Croton eluteria. The taxon was transferred to Arthopyrenia by Johannes Müller Argoviensis in 1888, and later reclassified in the genus Constrictolumina by Robert Lücking and colleagues. The holotype is housed in Acharius's herbarium in Helsinki (H-ACH).

Two names introduced by Müller Argoviensis in 1885 are now regarded as synonyms. Arthopyrenia planior is based on collections from Cuba by Charles Wright. Similarly, Arthopyrenia planorbiculata is also from Cuba and based on Wright's material. Both are now considered conspecific with Constrictolumina planorbis.

== Description ==
Constrictolumina planorbis has a thin, whitish thallus. Its fruiting bodies (ascomata) are solitary, 0.2–0.4 mm in diameter, and emerge slightly above the surface. They range from flattened to hemispherical in shape, with an apical opening. The upper part of the wall usually extends outward to form a broad, shield-like structure up to 1 mm across, while the lower wall is absent.

The asci are narrowly elliptical, measuring 55–100 by 12–17 (occasionally up to 20) μm. Each ascus contains spores arranged in one or two rows. These ascospores are narrowly egg-shaped, typically divided by a single cross-wall but sometimes with three, and surrounded by a thin outer layer (perispore). They measure 17–23 by 5–7 μm.

Asexual reproductive structures (pycnidia) are often present. These produce long, thread-like conidia that are usually curved, measuring 20–27 by 1 μm. Both the thallus and ascomata are negative in standard chemical spot tests (UV and K), and thin-layer chromatography has not revealed any secondary metabolites.

== Habitat and distribution ==
Constrictolumina planorbis has a pantropical distribution, with records from North America and the Caribbean (United States, Bahamas, Cayman Islands, Jamaica, Puerto Rico, Dominican Republic, and Cuba) as well as from the Pacific region (Papua New Guinea and Australia). It typically occurs in warm, humid tropical habitats.
