= Stigmidium cerinae =

Scientific classification
- Domain: Eukaryota
- Kingdom: Fungi
- Division: Ascomycota
- Class: Dothideomycetes
- Order: Capnodiales
- Family: Mycosphaerellaceae
- Genus: Stigmidium
- Species: S. cerinae

Binomial name
- Stigmidium cerinae Cl.Roux & Triebel (1994)

Species of lichen

Stigmidium cerinae is a species of lichenicolous (lichen-dwelling) fungus in the family Mycosphaerellaceae. It was formally described as a new species in 1994 by mycologists Claude Roux and Dagmar Triebel. The type specimen was collected in Austria from the apothecia of the muscicolous (moss-dwelling) species Caloplaca stillicidiorum. It infects lichens in the genus Caloplaca, and more generally, members of the family Teloschistaceae. Infection by the fungus results in bleaching of the host hymenium.

== Description ==
Stigmidium cerinae is distinguished by its globular to slightly elongated ascomata, which are exceptionally dark, glossy, and appear in abundance, ranging from 6 to 60 on the apothecia of the lichen host. These ascomata partially or fully darken the disc of the host, appearing embedded to varying degrees. The wall of the ascomata has a deep rufous-brown hue, with the upper portion appearing darker compared to the lighter lower part. This structure measures between 5 and 10 μm in thickness and consists of cells with a similarly coloured wall, which are internally coated with very fine brown pigment granules.

The cellular lumina within the ascomata wall are distinguishable, with sizes varying in tangential and vertical planes. The periphyses and pseudoparaphyses within the ascomata are well-defined and visible. The asci, which house the spores, have a club-like shape and are almost sessile or bear a short stalk. As for the ascospores, they initially appear colourless, turning to a light brown towards the end of their lifecycle, possibly when they are dead. These spores are long, narrow, and range in their dimensions, typically three to four times as long as they are wide. They possess a thin wall and an outer perispore that is barely discernible, not creating a halo. The cells within the spores are nearly equal, containing two large oil droplets.

In addition to the reproductive ascomata, Stigmidium cerinae also features conidiomata, albeit infrequently observed. These structures are globular and consist of a light brown wall made up of isodiametric cells. The conidia generated are small in size. Vegetative hyphae are present, colourless, and hardly visible without staining, scattered throughout the hymenium and subhymenium of the host.

== Distribution ==
The fungus has been recorded from several localities: Austria, Germany, Italy, Switzerland, Taymyr Peninsula in the Far North of Russia, the East Siberian Lowland, Romania, and Slovenia. Although it was reported from North America in 2001, these sightings were later revised to represent the species Stigmidium epistigmellum.
