= Naetrocymbe =

Scientific classification
- Kingdom: Fungi
- Division: Ascomycota
- Class: Dothideomycetes
- Order: Pleosporales
- Family: Naetrocymbaceae
- Genus: Naetrocymbe; Körb. (1865)

Type species
- Naetrocymbe fuliginea Körb. (1865)

Synonyms
- Naetrocymbe Körb. (1856); Santessoniolichen Tomas. & Cif. (1952); Santessoniomyces Cif. & Tomas. (1953)

Genus of fungi

Naetrocymbe is a genus of about 20 species of fungi belonging to the family Naetrocymbaceae. These fungi typically live embedded in the bark of smooth-trunked trees and are barely visible except for tiny dark dots that contain their spores. Most species function primarily as bark-dwelling fungi, with only some forming casual partnerships with algae to create lichens. The genus was established in 1865 by Gustav Wilhelm Körber, with the name derived from Greek words meaning 'spindle' and 'boat' in reference to the characteristic spore shape. These fungi reproduce through flask-shaped structures that appear as tiny dark dots on tree bark, often capped with a small dark 'roof' of compacted fungal material.

== Taxonomy ==
The genus Naetrocymbe was circumscribed by the Silesian-German lichenologist Gustav Wilhelm Körber in 1865 as a new genus, with N. fuliginea as the type species. Körber distinguished Naetrocymbe from related genera by its small, nipple-like fruiting bodies that develop from bumps on the thallus, with a tiny pore that can be either sunken or expanded into a small disc. He noted that the genus was essentially the same as Coccodinium, which had been described earlier by Abramo Bartolommeo Massalongo, but since Massalongo had published his genus earlier, Körber acknowledged that his genus should be considered a synonym if Massalongo's genus were to be accepted. However, Körber argued that the lichen he was describing had not been adequately published in Massalongo's work, justifying his establishment of the new genus name. The genus name is derived from the Greek words νήτρον (spindle) and κύμβη (boat), referring to the spindle- to boat-shaped spores characteristic of the genus.

== Description ==
Naetrocymbe usually reveals itself only through its fruit bodies. The fungus lives embedded within the outer bark of smooth‐trunked trees and develops little or no true lichen body (thallus). Where present, the thallus appears as a faintly paler patch of tissue and, in some collections, may be loosely associated with orange‐tinged filaments of Trentepohlia algae, though this partnership is optional rather than constant. Beneath the surface the fungal hyphae weave through the bark, forming an inconspicuous network sometimes referred to as a subiculum.

The perithecia—the flask-shaped reproductive structures—look like minute dark dots that may be round or slightly elongated when viewed from above. Each is capped by a shield-like involucrellum built from densely compacted fungal threads mixed with bark cells; this cap often spreads laterally, so the perithecia sit beneath a small, dark 'roof'. A much thinner, colourless to pale brown inner wall (the true exciple) surrounds the central cavity. Microscopic inspection shows a mesh of delicate, freely branching pseudoparaphyses threading a clear, non-amyloid gel (that is, the gel does not turn blue in iodine-based stains). The spore sacs (asci) possess two functional wall layers that separate at maturity—a fissitunicate mechanism—and end in a faint ocular chamber. Each ascus contains eight colourless ascospores that are club to narrowly cylindrical in shape. The spores have one, three, or occasionally more cross-walls and pinch sharply at each septum; with age they may darken slightly and acquire a fine, warty ornamentation. A slender gelatinous halo commonly surrounds each spore.

Asexual reproduction takes place in immersed to slightly protruding pycnidia whose walls share the same dark pigment as the perithecial caps. These chambers release simple, rod-shaped conidia that remain colourless and lack internal walls. No secondary metabolites (lichen productss) have been detected by thin-layer chromatography. The genus comprises about twenty temperate species that occupy the smooth bark of living trees, functioning mainly as bark-dwelling saprobes and forming only a casual, facultative association with algae in some situations.

== Species ==
As of June 2025, Species Fungorum (in the Catalogue of Life) accept 21 species of Naetrocymbe.

- Naetrocymbe atomarioides (Müll.Arg.) R.C.Harris (1995)
- Naetrocymbe atractospora (Zahlbr.) R.C.Harris (1995)
- Naetrocymbe cedrina (Zahlbr.) R.C.Harris (1995)
- Naetrocymbe depressa Bat. (1951)
- Naetrocymbe fraxini (A.Massal.) R.C.Harris (1995)
- Naetrocymbe fuliginea Körb. (1865)
- Naetrocymbe herrei K.Knudsen & Lendemer (2009) – California
- Naetrocymbe inspersa Bat. (1951)
- Naetrocymbe kentrospora (Branth) Alstrup (2009)
- Naetrocymbe lafoensiae Bat. (1951)
- Naetrocymbe massalongoana (Hepp) R.C.Harris (1995)
- Naetrocymbe mauritiae Bat. (1951)
- Naetrocymbe megalospora (Lönnr.) R.C.Harris (1995)
- Naetrocymbe nitescens (Salwey ex Mudd) M.B.Aguirre, P.F.Cannon & Minter (2015)
- Naetrocymbe perparum Bat. (1951)
- Naetrocymbe pithyophila (Th.Fr. & Blomb.) Cl.Roux (2023)
- Naetrocymbe punctiformis (Pers.) R.C.Harris (1995)
- Naetrocymbe quassiicola (Fée) R.C.Harris (1995)
- Naetrocymbe rhododendri (Arnold) Hafellner & Türk (2001)
- Naetrocymbe rhyponta (Ach.) R.C.Harris (1995)
- Naetrocymbe robusta Bat. (1951)
- Naetrocymbe saxicola (A.Massal.) R.C.Harris (1995)
