= Constrictolumina leucostoma =

Scientific classification
- Kingdom: Fungi
- Division: Ascomycota
- Class: Dothideomycetes
- Order: Trypetheliales
- Family: Trypetheliaceae
- Genus: Constrictolumina
- Species: C. leucostoma

Binomial name
- Constrictolumina leucostoma (Müll.Arg.) Lücking, M.P.Nelsen & Aptroot (2016)

Synonyms
- Tomasellia leucostoma Müll.Arg. (1885); Arthopyrenia confluens R.C.Harris (1995)

Species of lichen

Constrictolumina leucostoma is a species of corticolous (bark-dwelling) crustose lichen in the family Trypetheliaceae. This neotropical lichen forms thin, whitish crusts on tree bark and is distinguished by its small fruiting bodies that are often surrounded by conspicuous thin black rings that frequently merge to form clusters. It has a distribution spanning the Caribbean (including the Antilles), and the United States.

== Taxonomy ==
Constrictolumina leucostoma was originally described in 1885 by Johannes Müller Argoviensis as Tomasellia leucostoma, based on material collected from the bark of Croton eluteria. In 1995, Richard Harris misapplied the name as Arthopyrenia confluens, but this usage was distinct from the earlier Arthopyrenia leucostoma described by Abramo Bartolommeo Massalongo in 1852. In 2016, Robert Lücking, Matthew Nelsen, and André Aptroot transferred the species to the genus Constrictolumina, where it is now accepted. The holotype is preserved in the Geneva herbarium (G).

== Description ==
Constrictolumina leucostoma has a thin, whitish thallus. Its fruiting bodies (ascomata) are small, 0.1–0.2 mm across, and emerge slightly above the surface. They are solitary or occur in groups, often outlined by a conspicuous thin black ring 0.2–0.3 mm wide. These rings frequently merge, forming clusters of 2–10 ascomata. The lower wall of the ascomata is poorly developed or absent, while the ostioles are often sunken and encircled by a pale whitish ring.

The asci are mostly narrowly egg-shaped, sometimes nearly cylindrical, and measure 60–105 by 16–26 micrometres (μm). Each ascus contains eight ascospores, arranged irregularly or in two overlapping rows. The spores are narrowly ovate to ellipsoidal, divided by three cross-walls, and surrounded by a distinct outer layer (perispore). They measure 17–22 by 6–8 μm.

Asexual reproductive structures (pycnidia) are often present. These produce slender, rod-like conidia, 6–9 by 1 μm. Standard chemical spot tests (UV and K) are negative, and thin-layer chromatography has not detected any secondary metabolites.

== Distribution ==
Constrictolumina leucostoma has a neotropical distribution, and has been recorded from the Caribbean (including the Antilles), and the United States.
