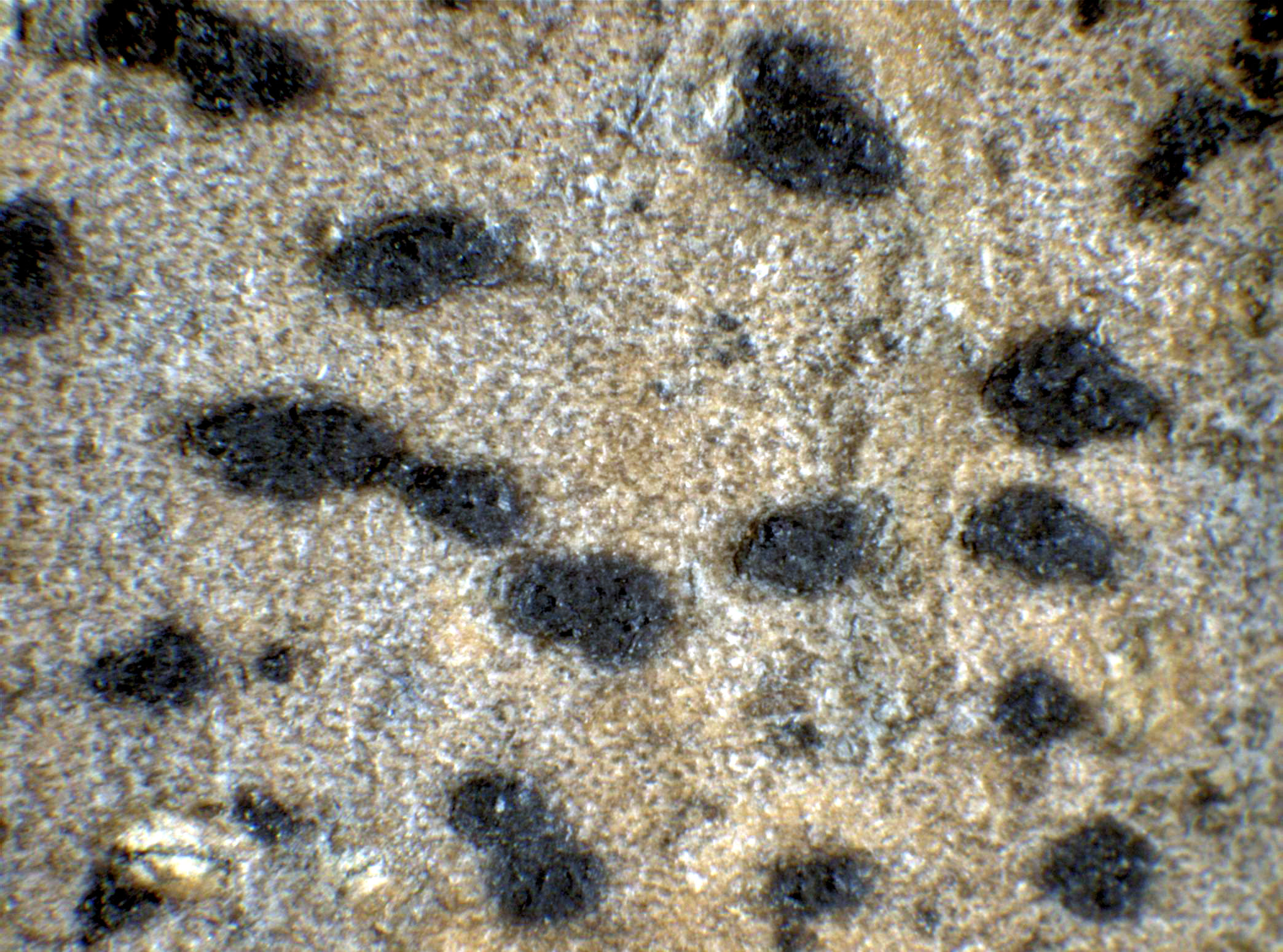
- Tomasellia arthonioides

Scientific classification
- Domain: Eukaryota
- Kingdom: Fungi
- Division: Ascomycota
- Class: Dothideomycetes
- Order: Pleosporales
- Family: Naetrocymbaceae
- Genus: Tomasellia; A.Massal. (1856)

Type species
- Tomasellia arthonioides (A.Massal.) A.Massal. (1856)

Synonyms
- List: Athrismidium Trevis. (1860); Syngenosorus Trevis. (1860); Beckhausia Hampe ex Körb. (1865); Chlorodothis Clem. (1909); Nothostroma Clem. (1909); Sciodothis Clem. (1909); Uleodothella Syd. & P.Syd. (1921); Tomaselliomyces Cif. & Tomas. (1953)

= Tomasellia =

Genus of lichens

Tomasellia is a genus of lichen-forming fungi in the family Naetrocymbaceae. It comprises seven species of corticolous (bark-dwelling), crustose lichens.

== Taxonomy ==
The genus was circumscribed by Abramo Bartolommeo Massalongo in 1856, with Tomasellia arthonioides assigned as the type species.

Tomasellia differs from other similar genera primarily by microscopic features of its fruiting structures and spores. It is provisionally placed in its current taxonomic position because DNA sequences, which would confirm its relationships, have not yet been obtained (as of 2023). Due to this lack of molecular data, its classification remains uncertain.

== Description ==
Species of Tomasellia form a crust-like, or crustose, lichen that is attached directly to the bark of trees and shrubs. The lichen's body (thallus) is thin and inconspicuous, often blending with the bark or appearing only as a subtle discolouration. When examined closely, the thallus can be seen as a dark-brown fungal layer that intermixes superficially with the bark cells. The surface is K−.

The fruiting structures (ascomata) of Tomasellia are embedded within this crust and are composed of several small, chamber-like cavities called locules. These locules resemble tiny flask-shaped structures known as perithecia, each opening outward through a small pore (ostiole). The ostioles are often raised slightly above the surface, becoming especially visible when wet. The chambers are separated internally by compact layers of fungal threads (hyphae), ranging from colourless to dark brown. Within each chamber, thread-like sterile filaments (hamathecium) support the reproductive cells. The spores (ascospores) are produced in specialized sacs called asci. Each ascus contains spores that are released through the ostiole. These spores are elongated, slightly pinched in the middle, and the upper half is typically broader than the lower half. They may be colourless or brownish and are finely roughened or wart-like in texture.

Tomasellia lichens also produce asexual spores (conidia) inside tiny dark, rounded structures (pycnidia) embedded in the thallus. The cells producing these spores (conidiogenous cells) are roughly cylindrical, and the spores themselves (conidia) are rod-shaped.

Chemically, Tomasellia lichens do not contain distinctive secondary metabolites (lichen products) commonly used to identify lichen species.

== Species ==
As of March 2025, Species Fungorum (in the Catalogue of Life) accept seven species of Tomasellia:

- Tomasellia americana (Minks ex Willey) R.C.Harris (1980)
- Tomasellia aphanes (Rehm) E.Müll. (1962)
- Tomasellia arthonioides (A.Massal.) A.Massal. (1856)
- Tomasellia diffusa (Leight.) J.Lahm (1885)
- Tomasellia dispersa (I.Hino & Katum.) I.Hino & Katum. (1966)
- Tomasellia gelatinosa (Chevall.) Zahlbr. (1922)
- Tomasellia himalayensis D.D.Awasthi & M.R.Agarwal (1968)
