= Constrictolumina porospora =

Scientific classification
- Kingdom: Fungi
- Division: Ascomycota
- Class: Dothideomycetes
- Order: Trypetheliales
- Family: Trypetheliaceae
- Genus: Constrictolumina
- Species: C. porospora

Binomial name
- Constrictolumina porospora (Vain.) Lücking, M.P.Nelsen & Aptroot (2016)

Synonyms
- Arthopyrenia porospora Vain. (1896)

Species of lichen

Constrictolumina porospora is a species of lichen in the family Trypetheliaceae. This Caribbean lichen forms thin, whitish crusts on surfaces and produces relatively large, hemispherical fruiting bodies that emerge above the thallus surface. It is distinguished by its unusually large ascospores with granular ornamentation and thick outer layers, and is known only from Dominica where it was originally collected in 1892.

== Taxonomy ==
Constrictolumina porospora was originally described in 1896 by Edvard August Vainio as Arthopyrenia porospora, based on material collected in 1892 at Morne Trois Pitons, Dominica, by William Robert Elliott. In 2016, Robert Lücking, Matthew Nelsen, and André Aptroot transferred the species to the genus Constrictolumina, where it is currently accepted. The holotype is housed in the Vainio collection at the University of Turku (TUR), with an isotype (duplicate) preserved at the Natural History Museum, London (BM).

== Description ==
Constrictolumina porospora has a thin, whitish thallus. Its fruiting bodies (ascomata) are solitary, 0.8–1.2 mm in diameter, and emerge above the surface, appearing hemispherical with apical openings. The ascomatal wall is thin and absent on the underside.

The asci are narrowly obovate and contain eight ascospores arranged in two rows. The ascospores are narrowly elliptical to ovate, divided by a single septum, but each cell is further subdivided internally by a flat, ring-like thickening of the wall, which gives the appearance of three septa. They measure 42–46 by 16–24 μm (excluding the outer layer), have strongly granular ornamentation, and are surrounded by a thick perispore up to 2 μm wide.

Chemical spot tests are negative: both the thallus and ascomata give no reaction to UV or K, and thin-layer chromatography has not revealed any secondary metabolites.

== Distribution ==
Constrictolumina porospora is found in Dominica.
