= Stigmidium marinum =

Scientific classification
- Kingdom: Fungi
- Division: Ascomycota
- Class: Dothideomycetes
- Order: Mycosphaerellales
- Family: Mycosphaerellaceae
- Genus: Stigmidium
- Species: S. marinum

Binomial name
- Stigmidium marinum (Deakin) Swinscow (1965)

Synonyms
- Arthopyrenia marina (Deakin) A.L. Sm. (1911); Sagedia marina Deakin (1854); Thelidium marinum (Deakin) Keissl. (1937); Verrucaria marina (Deakin) Leight. (1871); Arthopyrenia leptotera (Nyl.) Arnold (1871); Arthopyrenia litoralis var. leptotera (Nyl.) Boistel (1903); Pseudarthopyrenia leptotera (Nyl.) Keissl. (1937); Segestrella leptotera (Nyl.) Branth & Rostr. (1869); Segestria leptotera (Nyl.) Blomb. & Forssell (1880); Thelidium leptoterum (Nyl.) Hellb. (1890); Verrucaria halophila var. leptotera (Nyl.) Arnold; Verrucaria leptotera Nyl. (1865); Arthopyrenia leptotera f. brachyspora (Erichsen) Grummann (1963); Pseudarthopyrenia leptotera f. brachyspora Erichsen (1942); Arthopyrenia marina f. tenuicula (B. de Lesd.) Zahlbr. (1921); Sagedia marina f. tenuicula B. de Lesd. (1910); Thelidium marinum f. tenuiculum (B. de Lesd.) Keissl. (1937)

Species of fungi

Stigmidium marinum is a species of lichenicolous fungus in the family Mycosphaerellaceae. It is known to grow on Hydropunctaria maura, Verrucaria ceuthocarpa and Verrucaria mucosa.
