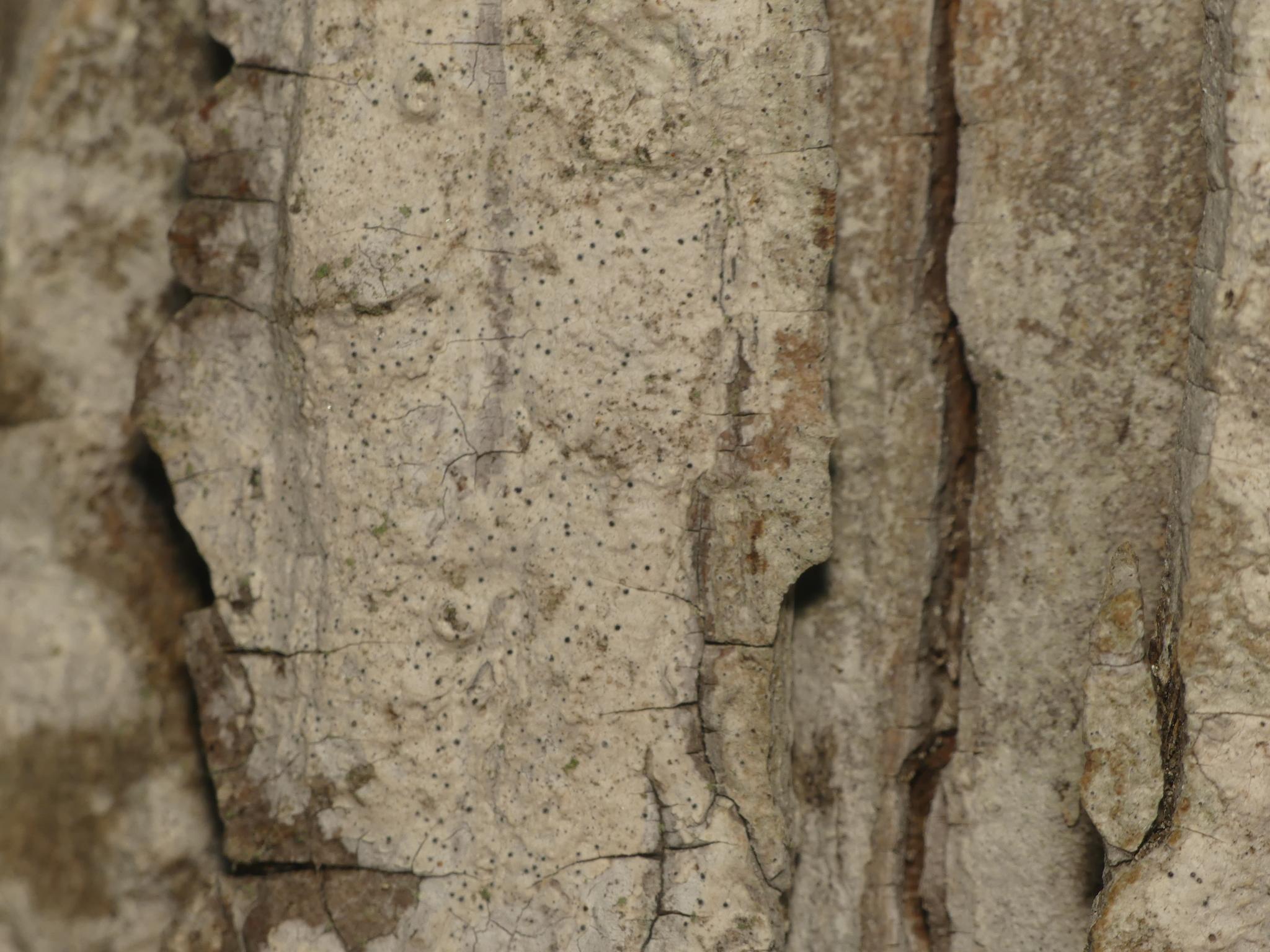
- Arthopyrenia fallaciosa

Scientific classification
- Kingdom: Fungi
- Division: Ascomycota
- Class: Dothideomycetes
- Order: Trypetheliales
- Family: Trypetheliaceae
- Genus: Arthopyrenia; A.Massal. (1852)

Type species
- Arthopyrenia cerasi (Schrad.) A.Massal. (1852)

Species
- See text

Synonyms
- List: Verrucaria * Leiophloea Ach. (1803); Leiophloea (Ach.) Gray (1821); Pyrenyllium Clem. (1909); Cyrtidium Vain. (1921); Mycarthopyrenia Keissl. (1921); Mesopyrenia M.Choisy (1931); Ciferriolichen Tomas. (1952); Jattaeolichen Tomas. & Cif. (1952); Arthopyreniomyces Cif. & Tomas. (1953); Giacominia Cif. & Tomas. (1953); Jattaeomyces Cif. & Tomas. (1953); Mycoarthopyrenia Cif. & Tomas. (1953); Mycociferria Tomas. (1953)

= Arthopyrenia =

Genus of fungi

Arthopyrenia is a genus of fungi in the family Trypetheliaceae. It was formerly classified in the eponymic family Arthopyreniaceae, but molecular phylogenetics studies showed that the type species, Arthopyrenia cerasi, was a member of the Trypetheliaceae. Arthopyrenia fungi typically form inconspicuous films embedded within tree bark and produce tiny, flask-shaped fruiting bodies covered by dark, shield-like caps. The genus includes both lichen-forming species (those that partner with algae) and non-lichenized species, with about 100 currently recognized species found primarily on bark and wood substrates.

== Description ==
Arthopyrenia forms an immersed thallus, essentially a film sunk into the outer bark, which is usually inconspicuous or only slightly paler than the surrounding tissue and spreads in a diffuse patch. It is not lichenised (i.e. it lacks a visible partnership with algae). The sexual fruit bodies are perithecia (flask-shaped structures with a minute pore), circular to elliptical in surface view. They are covered by a dark, often laterally spreading, clypeate involucrellum—a shield-like cap made of compacted fungal hyphae intermingled with bark cells—and surrounded internally by a thin, usually colourless exciple (the fruit-body wall). The hyphae are dark brown and react K+ (greenish) in potassium hydroxide. The tissue between and above the asci (the hamathecium) consists of robust, thick-walled pseudoparaphyses—sterile threads that are sparsely branched, occasionally connected to one another (anastomosing), and only distantly partitioned by cross-walls; the gelatinous matrix of the hymenium is iodine-negative (I–).

The asci are fissitunicate, meaning they have two functional wall layers that separate during spore release; they are roughly cylindrical, with an apical ocular chamber (a small, frequently conical cap-like apparatus), and do not stain in iodine (I–). Each ascus bears eight spores. The ascospores are clavate to cylindric-clavate (club-shaped to narrowly club-shaped), with one or three cross-walls (septae) and a strong narrowing at each septum; they are colourless and smooth when young, sometimes becoming faintly brown and minutely warted in old age. A broad, persistent gelatinous sheath surrounds each spore, a feature that can aid recognition in section.

Asexual reproduction occurs in pycnidia—minute, blackish, flask-like structures whose walls contain the same dark pigment as the perithecial involucrellum. The conidiogenous cells (which produce the asexual spores) are variably shaped—cylindrical, flask-shaped (lageniform), or nearly spherical—and often proliferate percurrently, extending through the old opening to make a new one like the telescoping of a pen. The resulting conidia are colourless, cylindrical to bacilliform (rod-like), and either lack septae or have three; some species produce two distinct asexual spore types (two anamorphs). No secondary metabolites are detected by thin-layer chromatography.

== Description ==
Arthopyrenia includes both lichenised and saprobic species. Where lichenised, the photobiont is a trentepohlioid alga; in other species no photobiont is present. The thallus is usually crustose and largely immersed in the bark or wood, but in some taxa it is reduced to a thin, byssoid (cottony) cover formed by a black subiculum (a superficial mat of hyphae), and it can also be absent.

The sexual structures are perithecial ascomata that appear circular to ellipsoid in surface view. A dark-brown, clypeate (shield-like) involucrellum overlies the fruiting body and is composed of compressed fungal hyphae mixed with host bark cells. The true ascomatal wall is black and becomes discontinuous beneath the hamathecium. A thin, usually colourless exciple surrounds the central cavity. The hamathecium comprises branched, anastomosing, sometimes bead-like pseudoparaphyses that are typically non-amyloid; in some species these elements partly dissolve, and the remaining material may stain amyloid. Periphysoids are also present around the ostiole.

The asci are bitunicate (double-walled), pyriform to clavate, with an apical tholus; they are non-amyloid and contain eight ascospores. The ascospores are usually hyaline (becoming brownish with age in some species), pyriform to clavate, and 1–3-septate with true septa (eusepta); walls may bear minute wart-like ornamentation. Reported spore dimensions are about 4–16 × 12–50 μm. Asexual reproduction occurs in blackish pycnidia producing conidia that are simple or 1–3-septate, variously oblong, ovoid, bacilliform, or thread-like. No lichen secondary metabolites are known from the genus.

== Species ==
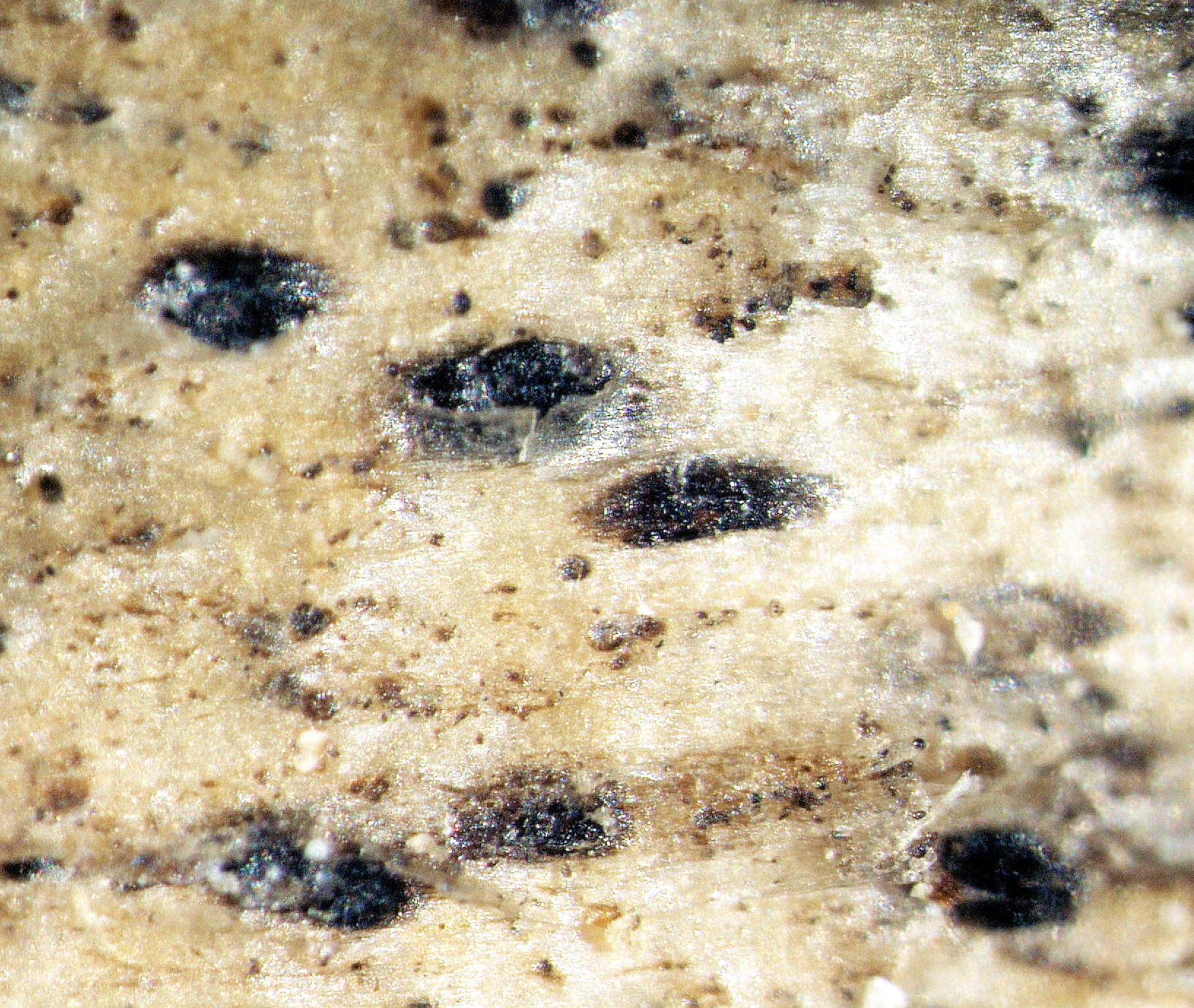
Arthopyrenia cerasi

As of October 2025, Species Fungorum (in the Catalogue of Life) accepts 99 species of Arthopyrenia:

- Arthopyrenia agasthiensis Kr.P.Singh & G.P.Sinha (2015)
- Arthopyrenia algovica (Servít) Riedl (1990)
- Arthopyrenia aloes Kainz, Aptroot & Triebel (2001)
- Arthopyrenia alpivaga Norman ex Keissl. (1923)
- Arthopyrenia amaura Zahlbr. (1930)
- Arthopyrenia amphilomatis Jatta (1889)
- Arthopyrenia analepta (Ach.) A.Massal. (1852)
- Arthopyrenia aphorisasa (Stirt.) A.L.Sm. (1911)
- Arthopyrenia arnoldii Zahlbr. (1901)
- Arthopyrenia atricolor Arnold (1891)
- Arthopyrenia atroalba Vain. (1890)
- Arthopyrenia betulicola R.C.Harris, E.A.Tripp & Lendemer (2013)
- Arthopyrenia biroi Szatala (1956)
- Arthopyrenia bispora (Makhija & Patw.) Kr.P.Singh & G.P.Sinha (2010)
- Arthopyrenia bukowinensis (Makar.) Tomin (1956)
- Arthopyrenia calcicola Werner (1966)
- Arthopyrenia callunae (De Not.) Aptroot (2006)
- Arthopyrenia carneobrunneola Coppins (1988)
- Arthopyrenia cerasi (Schrad.) A.Massal. (1852)
- Arthopyrenia ceylonensis (A.Massal. ex Leight.) Müll.Arg. (1883)
- Arthopyrenia cinereopruinosa (Schaer.) A.Massal. (1855)
- Arthopyrenia claviformis (Stirt.) D.Hawksw. (1985)
- Arthopyrenia colleta (Stirt.) A.L.Sm. (1911)
- Arthopyrenia contraria H.Magn. (1955)
- Arthopyrenia coppinsii Ravera (2006)
- Arthopyrenia degelii R.C.Harris (1995)
- Arthopyrenia desistens (Nyl.) A.L.Sm. (1911)
- Arthopyrenia dirumpens Müll.Arg. (1895)
- Arthopyrenia elachistotera (Nyl.) Riedl (1970)
- Arthopyrenia exasperata R.C.Harris (1995)
- Arthopyrenia fallacior Nyl. ex Müll.Arg. (1885)
- Arthopyrenia fallaciosa (Stizenb. ex Arnold) Thiyagaraja, Ertz, Lücking, Coppins & K.D.Hyde (2021)
- Arthopyrenia gravastella (Kremp.) Müll.Arg. (1882)
- Arthopyrenia grisea (Schleich. ex Schaer.) Körb. (1855)
- Arthopyrenia keralensis Upreti & G.Pant (1993)
- Arthopyrenia macquariensis C.W.Dodge (1970)
- Arthopyrenia maritima Øvstedal (1986)
- Arthopyrenia minor R.C.Harris (1980)
- Arthopyrenia naevia (Vain.) Riedl (1963)
- Arthopyrenia novae-guineae Szatala (1956)
- Arthopyrenia oblongens R.C.Harris (1995)
- Arthopyrenia pandanicola (Nyl.) H.Magn. (1955)
- Arthopyrenia picconii (De Not.) Aptroot (2001)
- Arthopyrenia platypyrenia (Nyl.) Arnold (1871)
- Arthopyrenia plumbaria (Stizenb.) R.C.Harris (1987)
- Arthopyrenia praetermissa D.C.Linds. (1975)
- Arthopyrenia salicis A.Massal. (1852)
- Arthopyrenia spilobola (Nyl.) Arnold (1891)
- Arthopyrenia stenotheca Müll. Arg. (1893)
- Arthopyrenia stigmatophora (J.Steiner) Riedl (1963)
- Arthopyrenia subcerasi (Vain.) Zahlbr. (1921)
- Arthopyrenia subfallaciosa M.Choisy (1954)
- Arthopyrenia subgregans (Müll. Arg.) D.Hawksw. (1985)
- Arthopyrenia subpomacea (Zahlbr.) Riedl (1963)
- Arthopyrenia subpunctiformis Müll.Arg. (1888)
- Arthopyrenia subvelata (Nyl.) R.C.Harris (1998)
- Arthopyrenia taxodii R.C.Harris (1995)
- Arthopyrenia texensis (Cooke) D.Hawksw. (1985)
- Arthopyrenia tuscanensis Coppins & Ravera (2006)
- Arthopyrenia welwitschii (A.L.Sm.) Aptroot (2006)
- Arthopyrenia zostra (C.Knight) Shirley (1889)

== See also ==
- List of former species of Arthopyrenia
