= Bathelium inspersomastoideum =

Scientific classification
- Kingdom: Fungi
- Division: Ascomycota
- Class: Dothideomycetes
- Order: Trypetheliales
- Family: Trypetheliaceae
- Genus: Bathelium
- Species: B. inspersomastoideum

Binomial name
- Bathelium inspersomastoideum Flakus & Aptroot (2016)

Species of lichen

Bathelium inspersomastoideum is a species of corticolous (bark-dwelling) lichen in the family Trypetheliaceae. Found in Bolivia, it was formally described as a new species in 2016 by lichenologists Adam Flakus and André Aptroot. The type specimen was collected from Plan de Manejo AISU in the Rios Blanco y Negro Wildlife Reserve (Guarayos Province, Santa Cruz Department) at an altitude of 242 m (794 ft); there, it was found growing on bark in a lowland Amazon forest. It is only known to occur in this and similar habitats in Bolivia. The species epithet refers to both its inspersed hamathecium (i.e., interpenetrated with granules) and its resemblance to B. mastoideum.
