= Trypethelium tolimense =

Scientific classification
- Kingdom: Fungi
- Division: Ascomycota
- Class: Dothideomycetes
- Order: Trypetheliales
- Family: Trypetheliaceae
- Genus: Trypethelium
- Species: T. tolimense

Binomial name
- Trypethelium tolimense Lücking, B.Moncada & M.C.Gut. (2016)
- Type locality: Vereda El Tambo, Colombia

Species of lichen-forming fungus

Trypethelium tolimense is a species of lichen-forming fungus in the family Trypetheliaceae. The lichen forms a light olive-coloured crust on tree bark with a smooth to uneven surface. Its reproductive structures are grouped together in rounded to irregular clusters covered by a contrasting brownish-white layer with whitish translucent openings. Both the lichen body and the clusters fluoresce yellow under ultraviolet light. The species is known from disturbed lowland forest remnants in Colombia and has also been recorded from central-western Brazil.

== Taxonomy ==
Trypethelium tolimense was described as a new species by Robert Lücking, Bibiana Moncada, and Martha Cecilia Gutiérrez. The type was collected in Colombia (Tolima Department, Purificación area) from disturbed forest remnants on a finca at about 300–350 m (980–1,150 ft) elevation.

The specific epithet refers to the geographic location of the type locality. The species has a typical Trypethelium growth form and spore type, but it can be separated from similar species by the combination of lichexanthone on the thallus and pseudostromata (UV+ yellow) and a pale yellow pigment within the pseudostromata that reacts K+ (yellow). It differs from T. xanthoplatystomum in lacking a yellow-orange pigment on the pseudostromata and in having a K+ yellow (rather than K+ red) medullary pigment.

Among other lichexanthone-containing species of Trypethelium, T. regnellii and T. luteolucidum differ by having an inspersed hamathecium and larger ascospores, and they lack a medullary pigment. In T. xanthoplatystomum, the pseudostromata are covered with a yellow-orange pigment and the internal pigment is orange and reacts K+ (red); in other Trypethelium species with internal pigments, the reaction is K+ (red or purple) rather than K+ (yellow).

== Description ==
The thallus is crustose and grows on bark, forming a continuous, light olive patch up to about 5 cm (2 in) across. Its surface is smooth to uneven. In section, it has a thick, cartilage-like cortex, a thick photobiont layer positioned near the surface, and a thin medulla that is immersed in the modified outer bark.

The perithecia (flask-shaped fruiting bodies) are usually grouped, with about 3–10 perithecia clustered in rounded to irregular pseudostromata. The pseudostromata are about (0.6–)1.0–3.0 mm in diameter, prominent, and up to about 0.5 mm high, and they are covered by a brownish-white layer that contrasts with the surrounding thallus. The ostioles are separate and apical, papilliform, and appear as whitish translucent points about 0.05–0.10 mm wide, each surrounded by a dark brown rim. Internally, the tissue between the perithecia contains light yellow pigment granules that react K+ (yellow) and, in section, bleed yellow. The excipulum is about 20–50 μm thick and carbonized except near the ostiole, with yellow pigment granules along its sides. The hamathecium consists of densely interwoven, net-like paraphyses in a clear gelatinous matrix (no colour staining reaction in Lugol's iodine, IKI−), and the ostiolar channel is also clear. Each ascus contains eight ascospores; these are narrowly fusiform, 11–15-septate with eusepta and angular lumina, 70–80 × 10–12 μm, hyaline, and iodine-negative (IKI−).

The thallus and pseudostromata contain lichexanthone and fluoresce yellow under ultraviolet light (UV+ yellow). The medulla of the pseudostromata contains a pale yellow pigment that bleeds yellow.

== Habitat and distribution ==
Trypethelium tolimense is known from low-elevation forest remnants in Colombia. The type collection was made in Tolima Department near Purificación, where it grew on bark in disturbed forest remnants on a finca at about 300–350 m (980–1,150 ft) elevation. It has also been recorded from the Brazilian states Mato Grosso and Mato Grosso do Sul.
