= Bathelium boliviense =

Scientific classification
- Kingdom: Fungi
- Division: Ascomycota
- Class: Dothideomycetes
- Order: Trypetheliales
- Family: Trypetheliaceae
- Genus: Bathelium
- Species: B. boliviense

Binomial name
- Bathelium boliviense Flakus & Aptroot (2016)

Species of lichen

Bathelium boliviense is a species of corticolous (bark-dwelling) lichen in the family Trypetheliaceae. Found in Bolivia, it was formally described as a new species in 2016 by lichenologists Adam Flakus and André Aptroot. The type specimen was collected from the Plan de Manejo AISU in the Ríos Blanco y Negro Wildlife Reserve (Guarayos Province, Santa Cruz Department), at an altitude of 242 m (794 ft); there, it was found growing on bark in a lowland Amazon rainforest. It is only known to occur in similar habitats near the type locality, and in islands of Amazon forest located within Beni savanna. The lichen is somewhat similar to Bathelium lineare, but unlike that species, B. boliviense contains isohypocrellin in its pseudostromata. This lichen product is quite rare in the family Trypetheliaceae, known to occur only in another two Bolivian Bathelium species.
