= Bathelium flavostiolatum =

Scientific classification
- Kingdom: Fungi
- Division: Ascomycota
- Class: Dothideomycetes
- Order: Trypetheliales
- Family: Trypetheliaceae
- Genus: Bathelium
- Species: B. flavostiolatum

Binomial name
- Bathelium flavostiolatum Flakus & Aptroot (2016)

Species of lichen

Bathelium flavostiolatum is a species of corticolous (bark-dwelling) lichen in the family Trypetheliaceae. Found in Bolivia, it was formally described as a new species in 2016 by lichenologists Adam Flakus and André Aptroot. The type specimen was collected from the Plan de Manejo AISU in the Ríos Blanco y Negro Wildlife Reserve (Guarayos Province, Santa Cruz Department at an altitude of 240 m (790 ft); there, it was found growing on bark in a lowland Amazon forest. It is only known to occur in similar habitats in Bolivia. The pseudostromata ostioles (pores) have nearby white spots that contain lichexanthone; this is a lichen product that causes these spots to fluoresce yellow when lit with a long-wavelength UV light. The species epithet flavostiolatum refers to this property.
