= Viridothelium tricolor =

Scientific classification
- Kingdom: Fungi
- Division: Ascomycota
- Class: Dothideomycetes
- Order: Trypetheliales
- Family: Trypetheliaceae
- Genus: Viridothelium
- Species: V. tricolor

Binomial name
- Viridothelium tricolor Lücking, M.P.Nelsen & N.Salazar (2016)
- Type locality: Altos de Campana National Park, Panama

Species of lichen-forming fungus

Viridothelium tricolor is a species of lichen-forming fungus in the family Trypetheliaceae. The lichen forms a reddish-brown to yellowish-brown crust on tree bark with a smooth to uneven surface texture. Its reproductive structures are grouped together in irregular to elongated white clusters that stand out conspicuously against the darker lichen body, with the black flask-shaped fruiting bodies embedded within and visible as blackish spots. The species is known from lower-elevation mountain forests and cloud forests in Panama and Venezuela, where it grows on bark of sun-exposed roadside trees.

== Taxonomy ==
Viridothelium tricolor was described as a new species by Robert Lücking, Matthew Nelsen, and Noris Salazar-Allen. The type was collected in Panama (Panamá Province) in Altos de Campana National Park west of Panama City, where it was found growing on bark of exposed roadside trees in lower-elevation montane rainforest at about 500–600 m (1,600–2,000 ft) elevation.

The specific epithet refers to the conspicuous contrast between the reddish- to yellowish-brown thallus and the white pseudostromata that contain the black perithecia. It is characterised by black perithecia with an eccentric to lateral ostiole, immersed in white pseudostromata that stand out strongly from the surrounding thallus, together with two-spored asci and large, muriform ascospores. The species was initially confused with Campylothelium puiggarii based on sparse material from Venezuela, but collections from Panama showed that it differs clearly, especially in the combination of black perithecia embedded in white pseudostromata. Although it shares several features with unrelated Astrothelium species such as A. campylocartilagineum and A. andamanicum, those species lack distinct pseudostromata; phylogenetic evidence places V. tricolor in the genus Viridothelium. A later multilocus phylogenetic study of Viridothelium (based on mtSSU and nrLSU ribosomal DNA sequences) included several accessions of V. tricolor from Panama and Venezuela. In that analysis, the V. tricolor sequences clustered together as a distinct lineage within the genus, supporting its treatment as a separate species. The closest sampled relatives in the dataset were V. vonkonratii and V. virens.

== Description ==
The thallus is crustose and grows on bark, forming a continuous patch up to about 7 cm (2.8 in) across. It is smooth to uneven in texture and ranges from reddish brown to yellowish brown. In section it is thinly corticate, with the photobiont layer embedded in the uppermost layers of the bark.

The perithecia (flask-shaped fruiting bodies) are solitary or, more commonly, grouped in irregular to elongate pseudostromata, usually with eccentric to lateral (rarely apical) ostioles. The pseudostromata are 1–10 mm long and 1–3 mm wide, immersed to erumpent and up to about 0.8 mm high; they are white and strongly contrasting with the surrounding thallus. Individual perithecia are usually completely immersed, but may sometimes show as gray-black bumps. The ostioles remain separate (not fused) and appear as blackish spots about 0.15–0.25 mm across. Individual perithecia are pear-shaped with a short ostiolar channel, about 0.5–0.7 mm wide and up to about 0.7 mm high. The excipulum is strongly carbonized and about 50–200 μm thick, and the narrow spaces between perithecia are filled with amorphous orange-brown tissue. The hamathecium consists of densely interwoven, net-like paraphyses embedded in a clear gelatinous matrix (IKI−, meaning it shows no colour staining reaction in Lugol's iodine), and the ostiolar channel is also clear.

Asci contain two ascospores. The ascospores are hyaline, oblong-ellipsoid, and richly muriform, with relatively thin eusepta, measuring about 120–150 × 30–40 μm (IKI−). No secondary metabolites were detected.

== Habitat and distribution ==
Viridothelium tricolor is known from Panama, where it occurs in submontane rainforest in Altos de Campana National Park. Collections there were made on bark of exposed roadside trees along an access gravel road, at about 500–600 m elevation.

The species has also been recorded from Venezuela (Aragua state) in Henri Pittier National Park, where it was collected in tropical cloud forest at about 1,100–1,200 m (3,600–3,900 ft). Based on available specimens, V. tricolor is known only from Panama and Venezuela.
