= Cruentotrema =

Scientific classification
- Kingdom: Fungi
- Division: Ascomycota
- Class: Lecanoromycetes
- Order: Graphidales
- Family: Graphidaceae
- Genus: Cruentotrema; Rivas Plata, Papong, Lumbsch & Lücking (2012)

Type species
- Cruentotrema cruentatum (Mont.) Rivas Plata, Lumbsch & Lücking (2012)

Species
- C. amazonum C. cruentatum C. kurandense C. lirelliforme C. puniceum C. siamense C. thailandicum

Genus of lichens

Cruentotrema is a genus of corticolous (bark-dwelling) lichens in the family Graphidaceae. It has seven species.

== Taxonomy ==
The genus was circumscribed in 2012 by Rivas Plata, Papong, H. Thorsten Lumbsch, and Robert Lücking, with Cruentotrema cruentatum assigned as the type species. This enigmatic lichen had previously been described three times under different names: as Stictis cruentata Mont. (1855), as Arthothelium puniceum Müll.Arg. (1893), and as Thelotrema rhododiscum Homchantara and Coppins (2002). Molecular phylogenetics revealed its true affinities in the subfamily Fissurinoideae of the family Graphidaceae. The genus name combines the species epithet of the type species with the suffix -trema. Three species were included in the original circumscription of the genus.

== Description ==
Characteristics of the genus include rounded, erumpent ascomata, a carbonised (blackened) excipulum, the absence of a columella, and inamyloid asci and hamathecium. The ascospores of Cruentotrema lichens number eight per ascus, and are colourless and ellipsoid with thick septa and diamond-shaped chambers (lumina) of the Trypethelium-type.

== Species ==
As of July 2024, Species Fungorum (in the Catalogue of Life) accepts seven species of Cruentotrema:

- Cruentotrema amazonum M.Cáceres, Aptroot & Lücking (2014)
- Cruentotrema cruentatum (Mont.) Rivas Plata, Lumbsch & Lücking (2012)
- Cruentotrema kurandense (Mangold) Rivas Plata, Lumbsch & Lücking (2012)
- Cruentotrema lirelliforme J.Kalb, Polyiam & Kalb (2016)
- Cruentotrema puniceum (Müll.Arg.) J.Kalb & Kalb (2016)
- Cruentotrema siamense Lücking & Kalb (2021)
- Cruentotrema thailandicum Rivas Plata, Papong & Lumbsch (2012)
