= Astrothelium stromatofluorescens =

Scientific classification
- Domain: Eukaryota
- Kingdom: Fungi
- Division: Ascomycota
- Class: Dothideomycetes
- Order: Trypetheliales
- Family: Trypetheliaceae
- Genus: Astrothelium
- Species: A. stromatofluorescens

Binomial name
- Astrothelium stromatofluorescens Aptroot & M.Cáceres (2016)

Species of lichen

Astrothelium stromatofluorescens is a species of corticolous (bark-dwelling) lichen in the family Trypetheliaceae. It is only known to occur in a few locations in Brazil and Bolivia.

== Taxonomy ==
The lichen was formally described as a new species in 2016 by lichenologists André Aptroot and Marcela Cáceres. The type specimen was collected by the authors from the Parque Natural Municipal de Porto Velho (Porto Velho, Rondônia), where it was found growing on tree bark in a primary rainforest. The species epithet stromatofluorescens refers to the fluorescent properties of its pseudostromata.

== Description ==
The lichen has a smooth, somewhat shiny, pale ochraceous-green thallus with a cortex surrounded by a thin (0.2 mm) black prothallus line. The ascomata are spherical, measuring 0.2–0.5 mm in diameter, and arranged in groups of 7 to 50 in pseudostromata (a stroma in which fungal cells and bits of host tissue are mixed). The ascospores, which number eight per ascus, are hyaline, spindle-shaped (fusiform) with rounded edges, and measure 20–23 by 7–9 μm. The spores have 3 transverse septa that form diamond-shaped cavities (lumina), and are ensheathed in a gelatinous layer up to 6 μm thick.

The pseudostromata contain lichexanthone, a lichen product that causes these structures to fluoresce a yellow colour when lit with a long-wavelength UV light. A similar species, Astrothelium phlyctaena, is distinguished by having lichexanthone in both the pseudostromata and the thallus.

== Habitat and distribution ==
Astrothelium stromatofluorescens is only known to occur in Brazil and Bolivia. In addition to the type locality in Rondônia, it has also been recorded in Amazonas. In Bolivia, it was found in the Ríos Blanco y Negro Wildlife Reserve (Santa Cruz).
