= Astrothelium subendochryseum =

Scientific classification
- Kingdom: Fungi
- Division: Ascomycota
- Class: Dothideomycetes
- Order: Trypetheliales
- Family: Trypetheliaceae
- Genus: Astrothelium
- Species: A. subendochryseum

Binomial name
- Astrothelium subendochryseum Lücking, M.P.Nelsen & Marcelli (2016)
- Type locality: Serra do Caraça, Brazil

Species of lichen-forming fungus

Astrothelium subendochryseum is a species of crustose lichen-forming fungus in the family Trypetheliaceae. The lichen forms an olive-green crust on tree bark with a distinctively blistered to strongly uneven surface. Its reproductive structures are grouped together in irregular clusters that are partially covered by greenish tissue on the sides while exposing dark gray-brown tops with small black dots. The species occurs in Atlantic Forest regions of Brazil and has also been recorded from Central America, including El Salvador and Costa Rica.

== Taxonomy ==
Astrothelium subendochryseum was described as a new species in 2016 by Robert Lücking, Matthew Nelsen, and Marcelo Marcelli. The type was collected in southeastern Brazil (Minas Gerais, Serra do Caraça, Santuário do Caraça) near Cascatinha Waterfall, where it was found on bark in disturbed remnants of gallery forest within Atlantic Forest at about 1,300–1,400 m (4,300–4,600 ft) elevation.

The specific epithet refers to its close relationship with Astrothelium endochryseum. The new species differs from A. endochryseum in lacking pigment in the pseudostromata (aggregated fruiting body structures) and in having the pseudostromata laterally covered by thallus tissue. Although it shows the kind of pseudostromata typical of taxa once placed in the genus Bathelium, it can be told apart by the distinct lateral thallus covering and by the absence of a medullary pigment in the pseudostromata. It also resembles members of the Astrothelium nitidiusculum complex in some anatomical features, but those species lack Bathelium-like pseudostromata and are not considered closely related. An additional specimen has been reported from El Salvador, indicating the species occurs beyond its Brazilian type locality.

== Description ==
The thallus is crustose and grows on bark, forming a continuous olive-green patch up to about 7 cm (2.8 in) across. Its surface is bullate (blistered to strongly uneven). In cross section, it has a thick, cartilage-like cortex, a distinct photobiont layer positioned near the surface, and a thick medulla.

The perithecia (flask-shaped fruiting bodies) are aggregated, with about 10–30 grouped into irregular pseudostromata (localized structures containing multiple perithecia). The pseudostromata are about 1–3 mm across, erumpent (pushing through and rupturing the surface) to prominent, and up to about 1 mm high. They are laterally covered by an olive-green layer of thallus tissue, while the upper portions expose the dark gray-brown perithecia. The ostioles are separate and apical, appearing from above as black dots about 0.05–0.10 mm wide. Individual perithecia are pear-shaped and small (about 0.25–0.35 mm wide and 0.3–0.5 mm high). The excipulum is carbonized and about 30–60 μm thick. The hamathecium consists of densely interwoven, net-like paraphyses in a clear gelatinous matrix and is iodine-negative (IKI-); the ostiolar channel is also clear. Each ascus contains eight hyaline, spindle-shaped ascospores that are three-septate, with distosepta and diamond-shaped lumina, measuring about 22–25 × 8–10 μm (IKI-). No secondary metabolites were detected.

== Habitat and distribution ==
Astrothelium subendochryseum is known from Atlantic rainforest in the Serra do Caraça of Minas Gerais, Brazil. The type collection was made near Cascatinha Waterfall in disturbed remnants of gallery forest, where it grew on bark at about 1,300–1,400 m elevation. The lichen has also been found in Pará. Outside Brazil, the species has been recorded from El Salvador (Suchitoto, Hacienda Colima), where it was collected at about 400–450 m (1,310–1,480 ft) elevation. It has also been recorded from Costa Rica, where it was found on the southwest slope of the Turrialba Volcano at 2,100 m (6,900 ft) elevation, growing in a pasture with relict trees of a cloud forest.
