= Trypethelium xanthoplatystomum =

Scientific classification
- Kingdom: Fungi
- Division: Ascomycota
- Class: Dothideomycetes
- Order: Trypetheliales
- Family: Trypetheliaceae
- Genus: Trypethelium
- Species: T. xanthoplatystomum

Binomial name
- Trypethelium xanthoplatystomum Flakus & Aptroot (2016)
- Holotype: Ríos Blanco y Negro Wildlife Reserve, Bolivia

Species of lichen

Trypethelium xanthoplatystomum is a species of corticolous (bark-dwelling) crustose lichen in the family Trypetheliaceae. This tropical lichen forms yellowish to greyish-green crusty patches on tree bark and is distinguished by its bright orange-yellow, raised, wart-like structures that contain clusters of small fruiting bodies. It can be identified by its yellow fluorescence under ultraviolet light, caused by the presence of lichexanthone in the lichen's tissues. It was described as new to science in 2016 by Adam Flakus and André Aptroot from material collected in lowland Bolivia.

== Taxonomy ==
The species was described from a type specimen collected in 2009 in Ríos Blanco y Negro Wildlife Reserve, Guarayos Province, Santa Cruz Department, Bolivia. Its name refers both to the presence of the compound lichexanthone in the thallus and to its close resemblance to Trypethelium platystomum. The two are distinguished by chemistry: T. xanthoplatystomum contains lichexanthone (thallus UV+ yellow), while T. platystomum lacks it (thallus UV−).

== Description ==
The thallus is corticate, with a cortex up to 60 μm thick. It is smooth to slightly swollen (bullate), somewhat shiny, continuous, yellowish to greyish green, and up to 4 cm across, about 0.3 mm thick. It does not cause swellings in the host bark and is not bordered by a black prothallus.

The pseudostromata are distinct from the thallus, raised, irregular in outline, and 1.0–1.5 × 1.5–3.0 mm and 0.9 mm high. They are orange-yellow, with almost vertical to basally constricted sides, and contain a granular yellow-orange pigment but no embedded bark tissue. The ascomata are pear-shaped (pyriform), 0.3–0.5 mm in diameter, aggregated within the pseudostromata. Their walls are greyish to fully carbonized, uniform, and up to 60 μm thick. Each ascoma has an apical, unfused pore (ostiole) that is flat and black. The hamathecium is clear. The asci contain eight spores each. The ascospores are colorless (hyaline), spindle-shaped (fusiform), with rounded ends, divided by 8–14 septa, and measure 45–65 × 9–12 μm. They usually have a thin gelatinous sheath up to 3 μm thick. Pycnidia have not been observed.

The thallus surface is UV+ yellow, consistent with lichexanthone, while the medulla is K−. The pseudostromata surface is UV+ (orange) and reacts K+ (purple), while the inner yellow-orange pigment reacts K+ (carmine red). Thin-layer chromatography confirmed the presence of lichexanthone (major) and parietin (major).

== Habitat and distribution ==
Trypethelium xanthoplatystomum grows on the smooth bark of trees in Amazon forest and Moxos savannah. As of its original publication, it was known to occur only from Bolivia, with collections from Santa Cruz Department.
