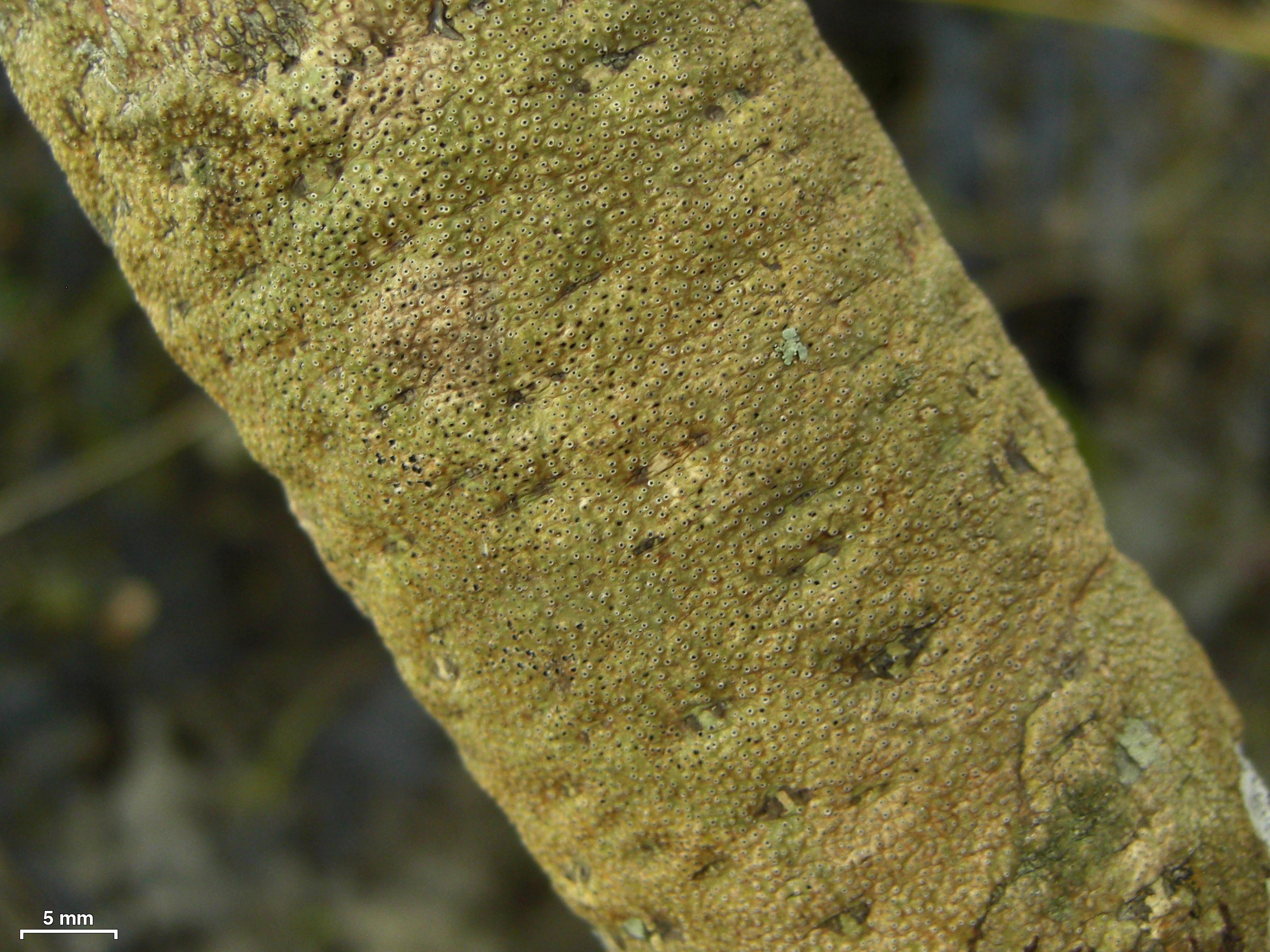

Scientific classification
- Kingdom: Fungi
- Division: Ascomycota
- Class: Dothideomycetes
- Order: Trypetheliales
- Family: Trypetheliaceae
- Genus: Astrothelium
- Species: A. marcidum

Binomial name
- Astrothelium marcidum (Fée) Aptroot & Lücking (2016)

Synonyms
- Pyrenula marcida Fée (1825); Verrucaria marcida (Fée) Spreng. (1827); Trypethelium marcidum (Fée) Müll.Arg. (1888)

= Astrothelium marcidum =

Species of lichen

Astrothelium marcidum is a species of crustose lichen in the family Trypetheliaceae. Known from the Neotropics, it has an olive-brown crust and compound, multi-chambered fruiting bodies, and it lacks detectable lichen substances. The species was originally described in 1824 from the bark of cinchona trees in South America.

== Taxonomy ==
The species was first described by Antoine Laurent Apollinaire Fée in 1824 as Pyrenula marcida, from material collected on the bark of cinchona in South America; the holotype is in the Geneva herbarium (G). Kurt Polycarp Joachim Sprengel's 1827 usage as Verrucaria marcida is a nomen nudum (a name published without a valid description). The taxon was later transferred to Trypethelium by Johannes Müller Argoviensis in 1888 as Trypethelium marcidum.

André Aptroot and Robert Lücking subsequently made the combination Astrothelium marcidum. In a previous discussion, Aptroot and colleagues proposed using the epithet marcidum instead of floridanum for this taxon because both entities match in thallus features, ascospore type, and absence of secondary substances. Re-examination of the Pyrenula marcida type, although abraded, showed that the fruiting body organization is astrothelioid (multi-locular with joined, often off-center pores), not trypethelioid as in Astrothelium floridanum: the remaining fruiting body bases are pear-shaped with their tips directed toward the center, a pattern characteristic of Astrothelium.

== Description ==
The thallus (the lichen body) is corticate (bearing a cortex) olive-brown, and smooth to uneven. The spore-producing structures (ascomata) are astrothelioid: several chambers are joined together and share fused, slightly off-center pores (ostioles). These joined ascomata form small pseudostromata (a compact tissue mass that houses the chambers) that are about 0.7–1.0 mm across, immersed in the thallus and becoming erumpent (breaking through the surface). They are covered either by the surrounding thallus or by a thin yellowish-white layer. The internal hyphal matrix (hamathecium) is clear. Each ascus contains eight colorless (hyaline), 3-septate, fusiform to ellipsoid ascospores measuring roughly 35–45 × 14–16 μm; the spores do not stain with iodine (IKI−). Standard spot tests are negative on both thallus and ascomata (UV−, K−), and thin-layer chromatography detects no lichen products.

== Habitat and distribution ==
Astrothelium marcidum is Neotropical. The type was collected from the bark of cinchona trees, and the species is corticolous (bark-dwelling).
