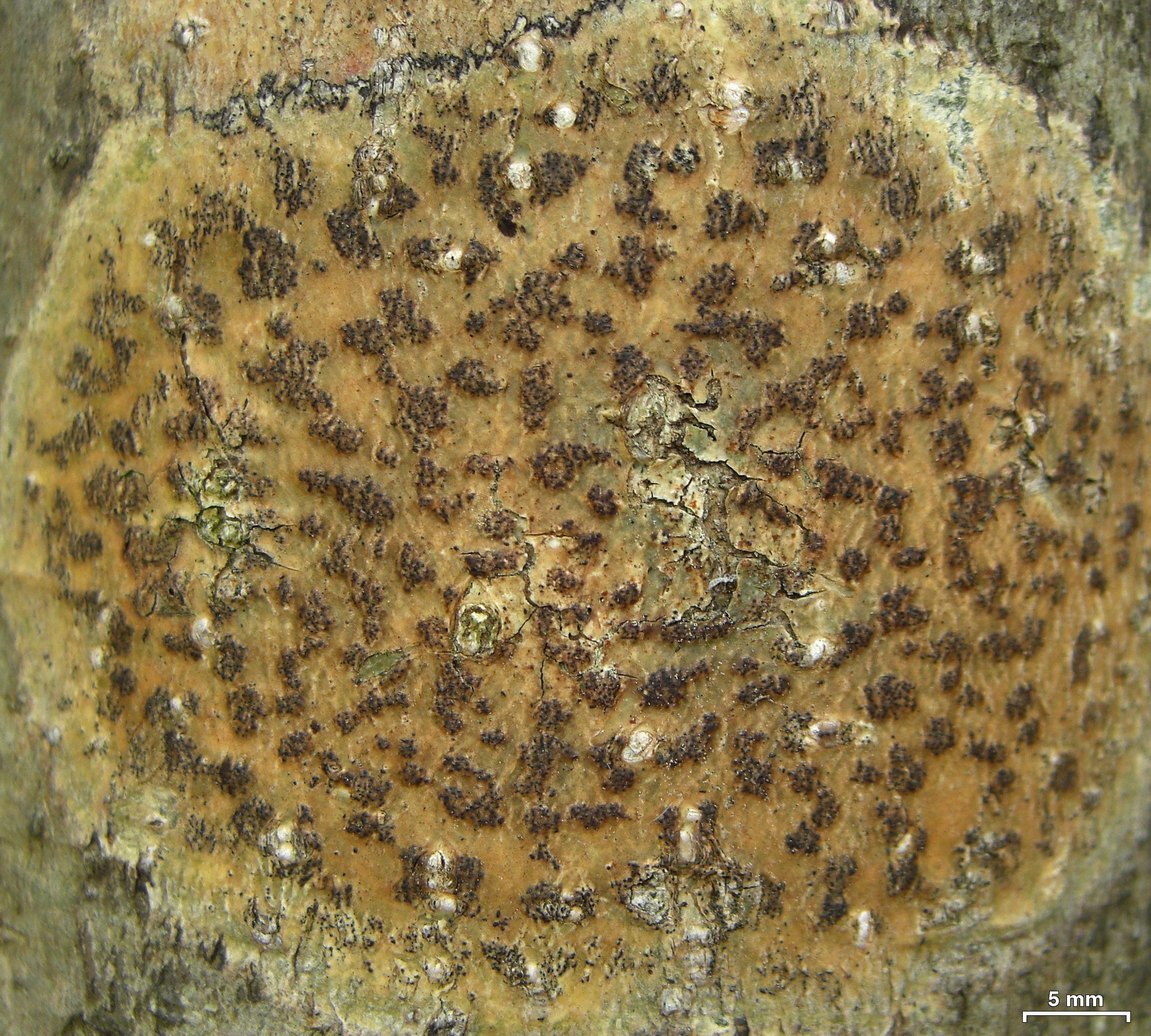
- Viridothelium virens

Scientific classification
- Kingdom: Fungi
- Division: Ascomycota
- Class: Dothideomycetes
- Order: Trypetheliales
- Family: Trypetheliaceae
- Genus: Viridothelium; Lücking, M.P.Nelsen & Aptroot (2016)

Type species
- Viridothelium virens (Tuck. ex Michener) Lücking, M.P.Nelsen & Aptroot (2016)

= Viridothelium =

Genus of lichens

Viridothelium is a genus of lichen-forming fungi in the family Trypetheliaceae. It comprises 11 species. Viridothelium species can be recognised as a warty, greenish crust whose spore-bearing bumps are more or less the same colour as the rest of the lichen, open by tiny pores, and produce clear multi-celled spores with only modest internal thickening.

== Taxonomy ==
The genus was circumscribed by Robert Lücking Matthew Nelsen, and André Aptroot in 2016 as part of a wide-ranging phylogenetic revision of the family Trypetheliaceae. The temperate North-American species Viridothelium virens was assigned as the type species. Lichens in this genus were previously assigned to genus Trypethelium, as part of the Trypethelium virens clade. Molecular analyses placed Viridothelium in a well-supported lineage next to Marcelaria and Trypethelium in the strict sense (sensu stricto), and statistical tests show that forcing it into either neighbour contradicts the sequence data.

== Description ==
The thallus of a Viridothelium lichen is a crust that carries a thin protective "skin" (cortex) and is often peppered with tiny warts, giving it a slightly rough surface. The colour of the crust and its outgrowths is uniform, so the fruiting parts rarely stand out against the thallus itself. Reproductive structures (ascomata) appear either on their own or in loose, slightly raised clusters called pseudostromata. Each ascoma releases spores through a pin-point pore (ostiole) that may sit at the top or off to one side and can fuse with neighbouring pores. The wall of the ascoma is built from densely interwoven, blackened fungal threads (hyphae), while the internal "packing" tissue (hamathecium) is a mesh of fine filaments that sometimes trap oil droplets.

Inside every spore sac (ascus) are colourless ascospores divided by a few cross-walls. The septa are only slightly thickened, a pattern termed sub-distoseptate—with very shallow internal partitions rather than the deep, diamond-shaped cavities seen in the related genus Astrothelium. The spores remain clear but may turn faint violet when stained with iodine, a weak amyloid reaction that helps distinguish the group.

Viridothelium bridges two better-known relatives: it differs from Astrothelium by its sub-distoseptate spores and from Trypethelium by lacking firm, tower-like pseudostromata. Minute flask-shaped pycnidia (structures that produce asexual spores) may also appear, though they are not always present.

== Species ==
As of June 2025, Species Fungorum (in the Catalogue of Life) accept 12 species of Viridothelium:

- Viridothelium cinereoglaucescens (Vain.) Lücking, M.P.Nelsen & Aptroot (2016)
- Viridothelium indutum (Stirt.) Aptroot & Lücking (2016)
- Viridothelium inspersum Aptroot (2016) – Papua New Guinea
- Viridothelium kinabaluense Aptroot (2016) – Borneo
- Viridothelium leptoseptatum Aptroot & M.Cáceres (2016) – Brazil
- Viridothelium megaspermum (Makhija & Patw.) Aptroot & Lücking (2016)
- Viridothelium sinuosogelatinosum Aptroot & M.Cáceres (2022) – Brazil
- Viridothelium solomonense Aptroot (2016) – Solomon Islands
- Viridothelium tricolor Lücking, M.P.Nelsen & N.Salazar (2016)
- Viridothelium ustulatum M.Cáceres & Aptroot (2017)
- Viridothelium virens (Tuck. ex Michener) Lücking, M.P.Nelsen & Aptroot (2016)
- Viridothelium vonkonratii Lücking, Naksuwankul & Lumbsch (2016)
