= El Puente Municipality =

El Puente Municipality may refer to:

- El Puente Municipality, Tarija, Eustaquio Méndez Province, Tarija Department, Bolivia
- El Puente Municipality, Santa Cruz, Guarayos Province, Santa Cruz Department, Bolivia
