= Trypethelium astroideum =

Scientific classification
- Kingdom: Fungi
- Division: Ascomycota
- Class: Dothideomycetes
- Order: Trypetheliales
- Family: Trypetheliaceae
- Genus: Trypethelium
- Species: T. astroideum

Binomial name
- Trypethelium astroideum Flakus & Aptroot (2016)
- Holotype: Noel Kempff Mercado National Park, Bolivia

Species of lichen

Trypethelium astroideum is a species of corticolous (bark-dwelling), crustose lichen in the family Trypetheliaceae. It was described as new to science by Adam Flakus and André Aptroot from material collected in lowland Bolivia.

== Taxonomy ==
The species was described from a type specimen collected in 2009 in Noel Kempff Mercado National Park, Santa Cruz Department, Bolivia, where it grew on trees in Moxos Savanna. Its name refers to the star-like appearance of its pseudostromata, created by the arrangement of the fruiting bodies. Trypethelium astroideum is most similar to T. subeluteriae but differs by having pseudostromata containing parietin (reacting K+ carmine red), an additional rust-red anthraquinone on the outside, partly fused ostioles, and larger, more septate ascospores.

== Description ==
The thallus is corticate, with a cortex 40–80 μm thick. It is smooth to somewhat swollen (bullate), continuous, somewhat shiny, olive-green, up to 7 cm across, and about 0.5 mm thick. It induces swellings of the host bark but is not surrounded by a black prothallus.

The pseudostromata are raised, irregular to star-like in outline, 1.0–1.5 × 1–3 mm and about 0.8 mm high, with sloping sides. Their surfaces are similar to or slightly paler than the thallus, bordered paler, and contain black ostiolar areas overlaid with rust-red pigment. Internally they contain orange granular pigment and parietin, embedded in bark tissue. The ascomata are pear-shaped (pyriform), 0.3–0.6 mm in diameter, aggregated within the pseudostromata. Their walls are fully carbonized, not layered, and up to 100 μm wide. Ostioles are mostly fused, eccentric to apical, convex, and black, each surrounded by a rust-red pigmented spot that often forms a star-shaped pattern. The hamathecium is clear. The asci contain eight spores each. The ascospores are colorless, spindle-shaped (fusiform), with rounded ends, divided by 12–22 septa, and measure 65–100 × 11–14 μm. They have rounded lumina and no gelatinous sheath. Pycnidia have not been observed.

The thallus surface is UV− and K−, and the medulla is K−. The pseudostromata surface is UV−, while the rust-red pigment near the ostioles reacts K+ purple (not dissolving). Inside the pseudostromata, the granular orange pigment reacts K+ carmine red (dissolving). Thin-layer chromatography detected parietin (minor) and an additional unidentified anthraquinone (trace).

== Habitat and distribution ==
Trypethelium astroideum grows on smooth bark of trees in lowland rainforest and in Moxos savannah. At the time of its original publication, it was known to occur only in Bolivia, where it has been collected in Santa Cruz and Pando Departments.
