= Viridothelium vonkonratii =

Scientific classification
- Kingdom: Fungi
- Division: Ascomycota
- Class: Dothideomycetes
- Order: Trypetheliales
- Family: Trypetheliaceae
- Genus: Viridothelium
- Species: V. vonkonratii

Binomial name
- Viridothelium vonkonratii Lücking, Naksuwankul & Lumbsch (2016)
- Type locality: Kadavu Island, Fiji

Species of lichen-forming fungus

Viridothelium vonkonratii is a species of corticolous (bark-dwelling) crustose lichen-forming fungus in the family Trypetheliaceae. The lichen forms a very pale olive-yellow crust on tree bark with an uneven to bumpy surface featuring gall-like swellings. Its reproductive structures are solitary or become crowded, almost completely hidden within the lichen body with only the upper portions sometimes breaking through as dark greyish areas, and each produces large ascospores divided into numerous horizontal segments. The species is known only from Kadavu Island in Fiji, where it was discovered during a field expedition in 2011.

== Taxonomy ==
Viridothelium vonkonratii was described as a new species by Robert Lücking, Kanokwan Naksuwankul, and H. Thorsten Lumbsch. The type material was collected in 2011 on Kadavu Island, Fiji, where it was found growing on bark. The species was named in honour of the bryologist Matt von Konrat, who organised the field trip during which the type was gathered. It is distinguished from the related V. virens by its larger ascospores, which also differ in their septation. The species has solitary to crowded fruiting bodies rather than forming pseudostromata, which further separates it from some comparable taxa.

The genus Viridothelium is morphologically very similar to Astrothelium, and the two cannot usually be told apart by external appearance alone. One commonly cited difference is that Viridothelium has relatively thin-walled ascospores (resembling those of Trypethelium), even though molecular evidence indicates that Viridothelium and Astrothelium are only distantly related. Species placed in Viridothelium may have either transversely septate or muriform ascospores; V. vonkonratii is among those with transversely septate spores.

In a later molecular analysis, Viridothelium vonkonratii was recovered as having a sister relationship with V. virens.

== Description ==
The thallus is crustose and grows on bark, forming a continuous patch up to about 10 cm (4 in) across. It is very pale olive-yellow and uneven to bumpy, with gall-like swellings. In cross section the thallus is corticate, and the photobiont layer lies deeply immersed within the modified outer bark.

The perithecia (flask-shaped fruiting bodies) are solitary or become crowded, and are almost completely immersed in the thallus. In some cases the upper portion breaks through the surface and appears dark greyish. They have separate, lateral ostioles and measure about 0.5–0.7 mm in diameter and up to about 1 mm high. The excipulum is 20–30 μm thick in section, weakly carbonised, and laterally covered by a thin layer of amorphous orange-brown tissue. The hamathecium consists of densely interwoven, net-like paraphyses embedded in a clear gelatinous matrix (IKI−), and the ostiolar channel is also clear.

Each ascus contains eight ascospores. The ascospores are hyaline, oblong-fusiform, and transversely septate, with about 15–21 septa; the septa are distinct distosepta and the lumina are diamond-shaped. Spores measure about 90–100 × 22–26 μm and are iodine-negative (IKI−). No secondary metabolites were detected.

== Habitat and distribution ==
Viridothelium vonkonratii is known from Fiji, where it was collected on Kadavu Island. The species grows on bark.
