= Viridothelium inspersum =

Scientific classification
- Kingdom: Fungi
- Division: Ascomycota
- Class: Dothideomycetes
- Order: Trypetheliales
- Family: Trypetheliaceae
- Genus: Viridothelium
- Species: V. inspersum

Binomial name
- Viridothelium inspersum Aptroot (2016)

Species of lichen

Viridothelium inspersum is a species of corticolous (bark-dwelling) crustose lichen in the family Trypetheliaceae. This tropical lichen forms smooth, olive-green crusty patches on tree bark in rainforests and is characterised for having its fruiting bodies buried deep within the bark rather than sitting on the surface. It can be distinguished from related species by the oil droplets that fill the internal structure of its fruiting bodies. It was described as new to science in 2016 by André Aptroot from material collected in Papua New Guinea.

== Taxonomy ==
The species was described from a type specimen collected in 1987 along the Hiritano Highway, about 50 km north-west of Port Moresby, near the Brown River. It is distinguished within the genus by its combination of solitary, deeply immersed fruiting bodies and an internal matrix filled with oil droplets (an inspersed hamathecium).

== Description ==
The thallus is corticate, smooth, somewhat shiny, and continuous, covering areas up to at least 7 cm in diameter. It is about 0.1 mm thick, olive-green in colour, and lacks both a visible prothallus and does not cause gall formation on the host bark.

The fruiting bodies (ascomata) are more or less psherical (globose), 0.5–0.8 mm in diameter, produced singly, and deeply immersed in the bark beneath the thallus. They do not form pseudostromata. Their walls are brown, sometimes only in part, and up to 50 micrometres (μm) thick. Each has a small apical pore (ostiole) that is convex and brownish grey. Internally, the hamathecium is filled with oil droplets (an inspersion). The asci contain eight spores each. The ascospores are colourless, spindle-shaped (fusiform), divided by 12–14 septa, measure 60–75 × 12–17 μm, have pointed ends and ellipsoid internal cavities (lumina), and lack any surrounding gelatinous sheath.

Both the thallus and the ascomata test negative under ultraviolet light (UV−) and potassium hydroxide solution (K−). Thin-layer chromatography detected no secondary metabolites.

== Habitat and distribution ==
Viridothelium inspersum grows on the smooth bark of trees in rainforest. It is known only from Papua New Guinea.
