= Viridothelium sinuosogelatinosum =

Scientific classification
- Kingdom: Fungi
- Division: Ascomycota
- Class: Dothideomycetes
- Order: Trypetheliales
- Family: Trypetheliaceae
- Genus: Viridothelium
- Species: V. sinuosogelatinosum

Binomial name
- Viridothelium sinuosogelatinosum Aptroot & M.Cáceres (2022)
- Holotype: Adolfo Ducke Forest Reserve, Brazil

Species of lichen

Viridothelium sinuosogelatinosum is a species of crustose lichen in the family Trypetheliaceae. This corticolous (tree bark-dwelling) lichen is characterised by its pale olivaceous-brown thallus and its unique ascospores, which are surrounded by a wavy gelatinous sheath. It was discovered in the Amazonas state of Brazil, within the Adolfo Ducke Forest Reserve near Manaus.

== Taxonomy ==
Viridothelium sinuosogelatinosum was formally described in 2022 by the lichenologists André Aptroot and Marcela Eugenia Cáceres, as part of a broader study aimed at cataloging the lichen biodiversity within a small area of the Amazon rainforest. The species epithet, sinuosogelatinosum, alludes to the distinctive wavy (sinuoso) gelatinous sheath that envelops the ascospores, highlighting one of its most distinguishing features.

== Description ==
The thallus of Viridothelium sinuosogelatinosum is crustose (crust-like), corticate, and has a dull pale olivaceous-brown colouration. It does not have a prothallus bordering it. The ascomata (fruiting bodies) are single, either globose or pear-shaped, measuring between 0.4 and 0.6 mm in diameter, and are black in colour. The ostioles are apical or slightly off-centre, dark brown with a pale dot in the centre, and concave.

The hamathecium (a tissue composed of filamentous hyphae) lacks any inspersed oil droplets. Ascospores are produced eight per ascus, are hyaline (transparent), and 3(–4)-septate. They measure 33–37 by 8–11 μm, and are long-ellipsoid in shape with rectangular lumina. Each spore is encased in a wavy gelatinous sheath up to 5 μm thick. No pycnidia (asexual fruiting bodies) have been observed to occur in this species.

Spot tests performed on the thallus show no reaction to ultraviolet light, and negative results for standard lichen substances reactions (C, K, KC, P).
