= Bathelium porinosporum =

Scientific classification
- Kingdom: Fungi
- Division: Ascomycota
- Class: Dothideomycetes
- Order: Trypetheliales
- Family: Trypetheliaceae
- Genus: Bathelium
- Species: B. porinosporum

Binomial name
- Bathelium porinosporum Lücking, M.P.Nelsen & Gueidan (2016)

Species of lichen-forming fungus

Bathelium porinosporum is a species of crustose lichen-forming fungus in the family Trypetheliaceae. The lichen forms a light olive-coloured crust on tree bark with a smooth to uneven surface. Its reproductive structures are solitary, dark reddish-brown, somewhat flattened fruiting bodies that sit directly on the lichen surface without being covered by tissue, and are unusual in the genus for producing spores with horizontal divisions rather than complex internal compartments. The species is known from Vietnam, China, and India, where it grows in tropical and subtropical forest regions.

== Taxonomy ==
Bathelium porinosporum was described as a new species by Robert Lücking, Matthew Nelsen, and Cécile Gueidan. The type was collected in Vietnam (Đồng Nai province) in Cát Tiên National Park in February 2012, where it was found growing on bark.

The species was distinguished from other members of Bathelium by its ascospores, which are divided by transverse cross-walls – chiefly three-septate – and euseptate, meaning the walls between the spore cells and the outer spore wall are relatively thin. This spore type is unusual in the genus and, if seen in isolation, can resemble the spores of the unrelated genus Porina; the epithet porinosporum refers to this resemblance. Although the species has typical Bathelium-like, sessile, dark perithecia, it is described as the only currently recognized member of the genus with transversely septate ascospores. In a later molecular phylogenetics analysis, it was recovered as sister to Bathelium madreporiforme.

== Description ==
The thallus is crustose and grows on bark, forming a continuous, light olive patch up to about 10 cm (4 in) across. The surface is smooth to uneven. In section the thallus has a thick, cartilaginous cortex, with an irregular photobiont layer that is immersed within the modified outer bark.

The perithecia (flask-shaped fruiting bodies) are solitary and sessile, with a constricted base and an apical ostiole, and they lack a thalline cover. They are somewhat flattened and nearly spherical, dark reddish brown, and measure about 0.4–0.5 mm wide by 0.25–0.30 mm high. The ostiolar area is flattened and appears as a grey-brown spot about 0.10–0.15 mm wide, often divided by a thin slit. The excipulum is carbonized (blackened) and about 30–50 μm thick in section, laterally covered by amorphous orange-brown tissue and what appears to be a carbonized cortex. The hamathecium consists of densely interwoven, net-like paraphyses embedded in a clear gelatinous matrix, and the ostiolar channel is also clear.

Asci contain eight hyaline, spindle-shaped ascospores that are transversely septate, with three to five eusepta, measuring about 20–30 × 6–7 μm (IKI−). The perithecial wall contains a thinly dispersed reddish-brown pigment that bleeds deep yellow at first and then deep orange to cinnabar red.

== Habitat and distribution ==
Bathelium porinosporum is known from southern Vietnam, where it occurs in and around Cát Tiên National Park in Đồng Nai province. Collections were made on bark in the Western Highlands region, including sites near ranger facilities, within plantations, and on planted Dipterocarpus trees along roadsides.

In addition to the type collection, several further specimens have been reported from nearby localities within the park area. It has also been recorded from China (Xishuangbanna Tropical Botanical Garden, Yunnan), and from India.
