= Ascensión de Guarayos Airport =

Ascención de Guarayos Airport
- IATA: ASC; ICAO: SLAS

Summary
- Airport type: Public
- Serves: Ascención de Guarayos, Bolivia
- Elevation AMSL: 807 ft / 246 m
- Coordinates: 15°55′55″S 63°09′22″W

Map
- Location of Ascención de Guarayos Airport in Bolivia

Runways
Direction	Length		Surface
Direction	m	ft	Surface
17/35	1,220	4,003	Grass
- Source: Landings.com Google Maps GCM

Ascención de Guarayos Airport (IATA: ASC, ICAO: SLAS) is an airport serving Ascención de Guarayos, a town in the Santa Cruz Department of Bolivia. The airport is 3 kilometres (1.9 mi) southeast of the town.

The Ascencion De Guarayos non-directional beacon (Ident: ASG) is located on the field.

== See also ==
- Transport in Bolivia
- List of airports in Bolivia
