= Trypethelium infraeluteriae =

Scientific classification
- Kingdom: Fungi
- Division: Ascomycota
- Class: Dothideomycetes
- Order: Trypetheliales
- Family: Trypetheliaceae
- Genus: Trypethelium
- Species: T. infraeluteriae

Binomial name
- Trypethelium infraeluteriae Aptroot & Gueidan (2016)

Species of lichen

Trypethelium infraeluteriae is a species of corticolous (bark-dwelling) crustose lichen in the family Trypetheliaceae. This tropical lichen forms smooth, olive-greenish grey crusty patches on tree bark and is distinguished by its distinctive orange, net-like raised areas that contain clusters of small fruiting bodies. It is known only from southern Vietnam, where it grows in plantations and along roadsides. The species was described as new to science in 2016 by André Aptroot and Cécile Gueidan.

== Taxonomy ==
The species was described from specimens collected in Cát Tiên National Park, Đồng Nai Province, Vietnam, in 2012. The holotype was found on bark in a tree plantation near a village gate, at an elevation typical of the western highlands. Molecular data were published with the description: the internal transcribed spacer (ITS) barcode sequence of the holotype was deposited in GenBank (KU179797), along with sequences from additional collections. Trypethelium infraeluteriae closely resembles T. subeluteriae in general appearance, but it differs by having lower, less prominent pseudostromata and smaller ascospores with fewer septa.

== Description ==
The thallus is corticate, smooth, somewhat shiny, and continuous, covering areas up to at least 5 cm in diameter and about 0.1 mm thick. It is olive-greenish grey and lacks both a visible prothallus and gall formation on the host bark.

The sexual fruiting bodies (ascomata) are more or less spherical (globose), 0.3–0.5 mm in diameter, and grouped in clusters of 6–15 within pseudostromata. These pseudostromata differ in appearance from the surrounding thallus, being slightly raised, irregular to linear in outline, sometimes forming a net-like structure, and orange in colour. The walls are dark brown, up to about 50 micrometres (μm) thick. Each ascoma has a small apical pore (ostiole) that is flat to concave and grey. Internally, the hamathecium is clear and colourless, without oil droplets. Asci contain eight spores each. The spores are colourless, spindle-shaped (fusiform), 7–9-septate, 37–42 × 9–11 μm, with pointed ends and ellipsoid internal cavities (lumina); they lack a gelatinous sheath.

The thallus does not fluoresce under ultraviolet light (UV−) and gives negative reactions with potassium hydroxide solution (K−). In contrast, the pseudostroma surface and interior react positively with potassium hydroxide (K+ red). Thin-layer chromatography detected the presence of parietin, emodin, and two related anthraquinone derivatives.

== Habitat and distribution ==
Trypethelium infraeluteriae grows on bark of trees, including in plantations and along roadsides. It is known only from Cát Tiên National Park in southern Vietnam.
