= Viridothelium kinabaluense =

Scientific classification
- Kingdom: Fungi
- Division: Ascomycota
- Class: Dothideomycetes
- Order: Trypetheliales
- Family: Trypetheliaceae
- Genus: Viridothelium
- Species: V. kinabaluense

Binomial name
- Viridothelium kinabaluense Aptroot (2016)

Species of lichen

Viridothelium kinabaluense is a species of corticolous (bark-dwelling), crustose lichen in the family Trypetheliaceae. It was described as new to science by André Aptroot in 2016 from material collected on Mount Kinabalu in Malaysian Borneo.

== Taxonomy ==
The species was described from a type specimen collected along the summit trail of Mount Kinabalu, Sabah, at an altitude of 2,800 m. It is closely related to Viridothelium indutum, but differs in having larger spores with more septa. While V. indutum has ascospores measuring 90–105 × 12–16 μm, V. kinabaluense develops markedly larger ascospores, 100–150 × 18–23 μm, divided by 17–25 cross-walls, sometimes with an additional longitudinal septum.

== Description ==
The thallus of V. indutum is corticate, smooth, somewhat shiny, continuous, and about 0.1 mm thick, covering areas up to at least 7 cm across. It is olive-brown in colour and bordered by a black prothallus line about 0.3 mm wide. It does not cause gall formation in the host bark.

The fruiting bodies (ascomata) are roughly spherical (globose), 0.6–1.0 mm in diameter, produced singly, and emerge from both the bark and the thallus, often becoming largely exposed. They are black, lack pseudostromata, and have walls up to 100 μm thick. Each has a concave apical pore (ostiole) that is brown. The hamathecium is clear and colourless, without oil droplets. The asci contain four spores each. The spores are colourless, spindle-shaped (fusiform), pointed at both ends, divided by 17–25 septa, and occasionally have a longitudinal division. They measure 100–150 × 18–23 μm, and their internal cavities (lumina) are ellipsoid. No gelatinous sheath surrounds them.

The thallus and fruiting bodies show negative reactions under ultraviolet light (UV−) and with potassium hydroxide solution (K−). Thin-layer chromatography revealed no secondary metabolites.

== Habitat and distribution ==
Viridothelium kinabaluense grows on the smooth bark of trees in mountain forest. It is known only from Mount Kinabalu, Sabah, Malaysia, where it has been collected multiple times along the summit trail.
