= Viridothelium ustulatum =

Scientific classification
- Kingdom: Fungi
- Division: Ascomycota
- Class: Dothideomycetes
- Order: Trypetheliales
- Family: Trypetheliaceae
- Genus: Viridothelium
- Species: V. ustulatum

Binomial name
- Viridothelium ustulatum M.Cáceres & Aptroot (2017)

Species of lichen

Viridothelium ustulatum is a species of corticolous (bark-dwelling) lichen in the family Trypetheliaceae. Found in Brazil, it was formally described as a new species in 2017 by Marcela Eugenia da Silva Cáceres and André Aptroot. The type specimen was collected by the authors along a trail near a field station in the Adolfo Ducke Forest Reserve (Manaus); here it was found growing on tree bark in old-growth rainforest. The thallus of the lichen is dull olive-green, and lacks a prothallus. The species epithet refers to the black pseudostromata (a stroma in which fungal cells and remnants of host tissue are mixed). Ascospores number eight per ascus, have three septa, and measure 17–20 by 6.5–7.5 μm. Viridothelium ustulatum does not react to any of the standard chemical spot tests, and a chemical analysis with thin-layer chromatography did not find any secondary chemicals.
