= Viridothelium solomonense =

Scientific classification
- Kingdom: Fungi
- Division: Ascomycota
- Class: Dothideomycetes
- Order: Trypetheliales
- Family: Trypetheliaceae
- Genus: Viridothelium
- Species: V. solomonense

Binomial name
- Viridothelium solomonense Aptroot (2016)

Species of lichen

Viridothelium solomonense is a species of corticolous (bark-dwelling) crustose lichen in the family Trypetheliaceae. It was described as new to science in 2016 by André Aptroot from material collected in the Solomon Islands.

== Taxonomy ==
The species was described from a type specimen collected in 1965 on Tanabuli Island, near Tatamba, Santa Isabel Island, Solomon Islands. It is unique within the genus for its partly fused fruiting bodies with lateral openings and a black clypeus (a carbonised shield-like covering). In overall appearance it resembles a Pyrenula species with lateral ostioles, but differs by having thin, branching (anastomosing) hamathecial filaments and colourless spores.

== Description ==
The thallus is thin, yellowish brown, smooth, and sometimes absent over large patches—likely abraded by exposure to strong sea winds. The fruiting bodies (ascomata) are usually produced singly, though some may occur in groups with fused openings (ostioles). They are roughly spherical (globose), emerge from the bark and the thallus, and often become fully exposed. While true pseudostromata are absent, the ascomata are covered by a carbonised clypeus. The walls are black and up to 80 micrometres (μm) thick. The ostioles are positioned on the sides (lateral). The hamathecium is clear and colourless, without oil droplets. The ascospores are colourless, spindle-shaped (fusiform), with pointed ends, and divided by 15–19 cross-walls. They measure 75–98 × 17–20 μm and have ellipsoid internal cavities (lumina).

The thallus is UV-negative and shows no reaction with potassium hydroxide solution (K−). Thin-layer chromatography detected no secondary metabolites.

== Habitat and distribution ==
Viridothelium solomonense grows on the smooth bark of trees in coastal rainforest. It is known only to occur in the Solomon Islands.
