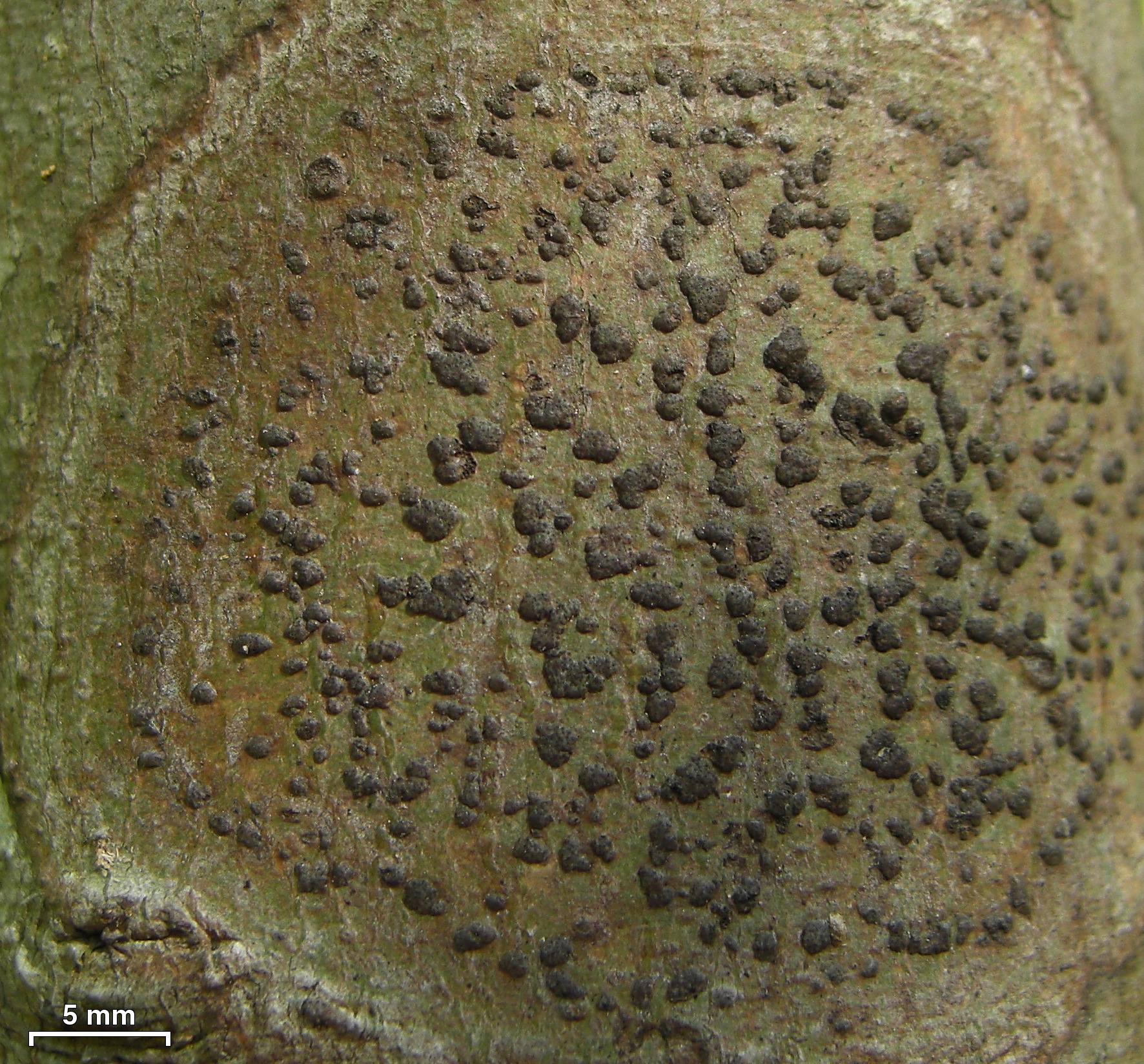

Scientific classification
- Kingdom: Fungi
- Division: Ascomycota
- Class: Dothideomycetes
- Order: Trypetheliales
- Family: Trypetheliaceae
- Genus: Bathelium
- Species: B. carolinianum

Binomial name
- Bathelium carolinianum (Tuck.) R.C.Harris (1995)

Synonyms
- Trypethelium carolinianum Tuck. (1858); Gyrophoropsis caroliniana (Tuck.) Elenkin & Savicz (1910)

= Bathelium carolinianum =

Species of lichen

Bathelium carolinianum is a species of crustose lichen in the family Trypetheliaceae. It is found in the eastern United States.

== Taxonomy ==
The lichen was first formally described as a new species in 1858 by American lichenologist Edward Tuckerman. His diagnosis of the new species was as follows (translated from Latin): "Trypethelium carolinianum, new species, with a crustaceous, smooth, and wax-like thallus turning from green to brownish, with warts that are depressed to somewhat hemispherical, confluent, of irregular shape, and somewhat anastomosing, turning deep brown to blackish, with a yellow stroma, perithecia that are ovoid, thin, and black, and ostioles that are papillate and black." The species epithet carolinianum refers to the type locality, in Santee Canal, South Carolina, where Henry William Ravenel found it growing on tree trunks in 1851. Richard Harris transferred the species to the genus Bathelium in 1995.

== Description ==
Bathelium carolinianum features a greenish-brown thallus. Its dark brown perithecia cluster in pseudostroma, which is rich in yellow pigment. This lichen commonly thrives on smooth-barked hardwoods, notably the American holly. It does not react with any of the standard chemical spot tests.

Trypethelium virens is somewhat similar in appearance, but its pseudostromata are the same color as the thallus, and its pseudostroma does not have yellow pigment.

== Species interactions ==
One of the main characteristics of the lichen Bacidia thiersiana, widespread throughout southeastern North America and described as new to science in 2020, is its frequent occurrence on and near the thalli of Bathelium carolinianum. Etayoa trypethelii is a lichenicolous fungus that has been documented to infect Bathelium carolinianum; it does not visibly damage the thallus of its host.
