= Cruentotrema amazonum =

Scientific classification
- Domain: Eukaryota
- Kingdom: Fungi
- Division: Ascomycota
- Class: Lecanoromycetes
- Order: Graphidales
- Family: Graphidaceae
- Genus: Cruentotrema
- Species: C. amazonum

Binomial name
- Cruentotrema amazonum M.Cáceres, Aptroot & Lücking (2014)

Species of lichen

Cruentotrema amazonum is a little-known species of script lichen in the family Graphidaceae. It is found in Brazil, Thailand, and Vietnam, where it grows in the understory of primary rainforests.

== Taxonomy ==
The lichen was formally described as a new species in 2014 by lichenologists Marcela Cáceres, André Aptroot, and Robert Lücking. The type specimen was collected by the first two authors from the Estação Ecológica de Cuniã at an altitude of 100 m (330 ft), where it was found in understory of a primary forest growing on tree bark. The taxon was placed in Graphidaceae genus Cruentotrema because of the morphology of its ascoma, and its astrothelioid, non-amyloid ascospores.

== Description ==
Cruentotrema amazonum is a corticolous (bark-dwelling) lichen that grows partially endoperidermal (i.e., beneath the surface of the substrate) and has a smooth to uneven dark olive-green surface. The thallus is up to 10 cm (4 in) in diameter and is continuous. The photobiont partner for this lichen is Trentepohlia (a genus of green algae), and the lichen lacks crystals between the cortex and photobiont layer. Ascomata are rounded to angular, erumpent, chroodiscoid, and have a complete thalline margin. The discs of the ascomata are partially exposed; they are light grey-brown and translucent. The proper margin is distinct and fissured-lobulate, visible as triangular lobules initially covering the disc, grey-brown, fused with inner portions of the thalline margin but splitting from outer portions. The excipulum is entire and brown or becoming carbonized in the upper half. asci have a fusiform to clavate shape, and the ascospores are ellipsoid, contains 3 septa, and measure 15–20 by 6–8 μm.

== Habitat and distribution ==
Cruentotrema amazonum was first described from primary rainforests in the state of Rondônia, Brazil, where it occurs in the shaded understory. In 2017, it was reported from Vietnam, and in 2022 from Thailand. The latter report was the first documented record of a Cruentotrema in Thailand.
