= Bathelium pruinosum =

Scientific classification
- Kingdom: Fungi
- Division: Ascomycota
- Class: Dothideomycetes
- Order: Trypetheliales
- Family: Trypetheliaceae
- Genus: Bathelium
- Species: B. pruinosum

Binomial name
- Bathelium pruinosum Flakus, Kukwa, & Aptroot (2016)

Species of lichen

Bathelium pruinosum is a species of corticolous (bark-dwelling) lichen in the family Trypetheliaceae. Found in Bolivia, it was formally described as a new species in 2016 by lichenologists Adam Flakus, Martin Kukwa, and André Aptroot. The type specimen was collected north of San Borja (José Ballivián Province, Beni Department)) at an altitude of 190 m (620 ft); there, the lichen was found growing on bark in a lowland Amazon forest surrounded by Beni savanna. It contains lichexanthone, a lichen product that causes it to fluoresce yellow when lit with a long-wavelength UV light. The species epithet refers to the pruina on both the thallus and pseudostromata.
