= Bathelium mirabile =

Scientific classification
- Kingdom: Fungi
- Division: Ascomycota
- Class: Dothideomycetes
- Order: Trypetheliales
- Family: Trypetheliaceae
- Genus: Bathelium
- Species: B. mirabile

Binomial name
- Bathelium mirabile Flakus, Kukwa & Aptroot (2016)

Species of lichen

Bathelium mirabile is a species of corticolous (bark-dwelling) lichen in the family Trypetheliaceae. Found in Bolivia, it was formally described as a new species in 2016 by lichenologists Adam Flakus, Martin Kukwa, and André Aptroot. The type specimen was collected near the biological station in the Beni Biological Station Biosphere Reserve (Yacuma Province, Beni Department) at an altitude of 175 m (574 ft); there, it was found growing on bark in an island of Amazon forest surrounded by Beni savanna. It is only known to occur in this and similar habitats in Bolivia. The species epithet mirabile makes reference to the "unusual combination of pigments in the pseudostromata".
