= Viridothelium leptoseptatum =

Scientific classification
- Domain: Eukaryota
- Kingdom: Fungi
- Division: Ascomycota
- Class: Dothideomycetes
- Order: Trypetheliales
- Family: Trypetheliaceae
- Genus: Viridothelium
- Species: V. leptoseptatum

Binomial name
- Viridothelium leptoseptatum Aptroot & M.Cáceres (2016)

Species of lichen

Viridothelium leptoseptatum is a species of corticolous (bark-dwelling), crustose lichen in the family Trypetheliaceae, first described in 2016. Found in Brazil, it resembles Astrothelium aeneum but differs in several key aspects, including the absence of pigment on the thallus and specific features of its ascospores.

== Taxonomy ==
Viridothelium leptoseptatum was formally described by the lichenologists André Aptroot and Marcela Cáceres in 2016. The type specimen was collected on the southern slope of the Serra de Itabaiana National Park, Sergipe, Brazil, at an elevation of approximately 400 m (1,300 ft), on the bark of a tree.

== Description ==
The thallus of Viridothelium leptoseptatum is corticate, smooth, somewhat shiny, and continuous, covering areas up to 5 cm (2 in) in diameter and approximately 0.2 mm thick. Pale olive-green in colour, the thallus is surrounded by a black prothallus approximately 1 mm wide. The presence of the lichen does not induce gall formation on the host bark. Ascomata (fruiting bodies) are spherical, measuring 0.3–0.5 mm in diameter. They are mostly aggregated in groups of 3–20, and are emergent from the thallus; they do not form distinct pseudostromata. The surface is not different from the thallus, covered by the thallus or not, and fully or partly free with visible carbonisation, and always at least partly covered by yellow pigment. The wall is black and up to 50 μm thick. Ostioles (openings) are apical, not fused, flat, and white. The hamathecium does not contain oil globules. Asci contain eight ascospores each. Ascospores are hyaline, 3-septate, fusiform, measuring 23–25 by 7–8 μm, and have rounded ends. The lumina are of similar shape to the ascospore cell walls, septa are thin, constricted at the septa, and are not surrounded by a gelatinous layer. Pycnidia were not observed to occur in this species.

The thallus surface of Viridothelium leptoseptatum is UV negative, and the thallus medulla does not react to a solution of potassium hydroxide (K−); the pseudostroma surface is UV+ (pink to orange), with pigmented parts reacting K+ (blood red) Thin-layer chromatography analysis indicates the presence of an anthraquinone substance, probably parietin.

== Habitat and distribution ==
This species is found on the smooth bark of trees in the Atlantic Forest and, at the time of its initial publication, was known only to occur in Brazil.
