= Trypethelium luteolucidum =

Scientific classification
- Domain: Eukaryota
- Kingdom: Fungi
- Division: Ascomycota
- Class: Dothideomycetes
- Order: Trypetheliales
- Family: Trypetheliaceae
- Genus: Trypethelium
- Species: T. luteolucidum

Binomial name
- Trypethelium luteolucidum Aptroot, Mendonça & M.Cáceres (2016)

Species of lichen

Trypethelium luteolucidum is a species of lichen in the family Trypetheliaceae, first formally described in 2016. Found in Brazil and Mexico, it is similar to Trypethelium regnellii, but differs by the presence of anthraquinone crystals in the pseudostromata.

== Taxonomy ==
Trypethelium luteolucidum was formally described by the lichenologists André Aptroot, Cléverton de Oliveira Mendonça, and Marcela Eugenia da Silva Cáceres in 2016. The type specimen was collected in Porto Velho, Rondônia, Brazil, at an elevation of about 100 m (330 ft), on the bark of Hevea brasiliensis in a plantation.

== Description ==
The thallus of Trypethelium luteolucidum is corticate, smooth to somewhat bullate, somewhat shiny, continuous, covering areas up to 10 cm in diameter and approximately 0.2 mm thick. The thallus is ochraceous in colour, not surrounded by a prothallus, and does not induce gall formation on the host bark. Ascomata are spherical, measuring 0.4–0.7 mm in diameter, mostly aggregated in groups of 2–7, and emergent from the thallus in pseudostromata with a decorticated upper surface different from the thallus. Pseudostromata are distinctly raised above the thallus, irregular in outline, sides almost vertical, up to 5 mm in diameter and 1 mm high, and the same colour as the thallus. The upper surface is whitish pruinose or grey to blackish due to the emergent ascomata, and contains crystals inside. The wall is carbonized and up to 60 μm thick. Ostioles are apical, not fused, flat, and brown. The hamathecium is inspersed with hyaline oil globules. Asci contain eight ascospores each. Ascospores are hyaline, contain between 11 and 21 septa, and have a long fusiform shape. They measure 60–110 by 12–15 μm, have rounded ends and diamond-shaped lumina, and are surrounded by a gelatinous layer up to 2 μm thick. Pycnidia were not observed to occur in this species.

The thallus surface of Trypethelium luteolucidum is mostly UV+ (yellow), and the medulla is K−. The pseudostroma is UV+ (yellow), and the crystals react K+ (yellow to red). Thin-layer chromatography analysis reveals the presence of lichexanthone and an unidentified anthraquinone.

== Habitat and distribution ==
This species is found on the smooth bark of trees in rainforests and is known from Brazil and Mexico.
