= El Puente Municipality, Santa Cruz =

Coordinates: 16.2767°S 62.9425°W

El Puente
- Municipality
- Interactive map of El Puente
- Country: Bolivia
- Department: Santa Cruz Department
- Province: Guarayos Province
- Time zone: UTC-4 (BST)

El Puente is a municipality in Bolivia. In 2009 it had an estimated population of 3032.

== Climate ==
Climate data for El Puente, elevation 2,345 m (7,694 ft)
Month	Jan	Feb	Mar	Apr	May	Jun	Jul	Aug	Sep	Oct	Nov	Dec	Year
Mean daily maximum °C (°F)	30.4 (86.7)	30.4 (86.7)	30.1 (86.2)	29.2 (84.6)	26.8 (80.2)	24.8 (76.6)	24.4 (75.9)	26.3 (79.3)	29.0 (84.2)	30.5 (86.9)	30.3 (86.5)	30.3 (86.5)	28.5 (83.4)
Daily mean °C (°F)	22.3 (72.1)	22.0 (71.6)	22.0 (71.6)	20.2 (68.4)	15.5 (59.9)	13.0 (55.4)	12.9 (55.2)	14.8 (58.6)	17.5 (63.5)	20.6 (69.1)	21.8 (71.2)	22.3 (72.1)	18.7 (65.7)
Mean daily minimum °C (°F)	14.1 (57.4)	13.8 (56.8)	14.0 (57.2)	11.2 (52.2)	4.2 (39.6)	1.2 (34.2)	1.4 (34.5)	3.4 (38.1)	6.1 (43.0)	10.7 (51.3)	13.2 (55.8)	14.3 (57.7)	9.0 (48.2)
Average precipitation mm (inches)	70.5 (2.78)	68.4 (2.69)	45.6 (1.80)	8.2 (0.32)	0.2 (0.01)	0.4 (0.02)	0.4 (0.02)	3.8 (0.15)	5.4 (0.21)	26.6 (1.05)	47.9 (1.89)	84.3 (3.32)	361.7 (14.26)
Average precipitation days	7.8	6.0	5.7	1.0	0.1	0.1	0.2	0.4	0.7	3.4	5.5	8.7	39.6
Average relative humidity (%)	53.9	54.7	55.8	54.0	49.4	50.0	48.4	51.1	49.7	51.3	51.9	49.0	51.6
Source: Servicio Nacional de Meteorología e Hidrología de Bolivia
