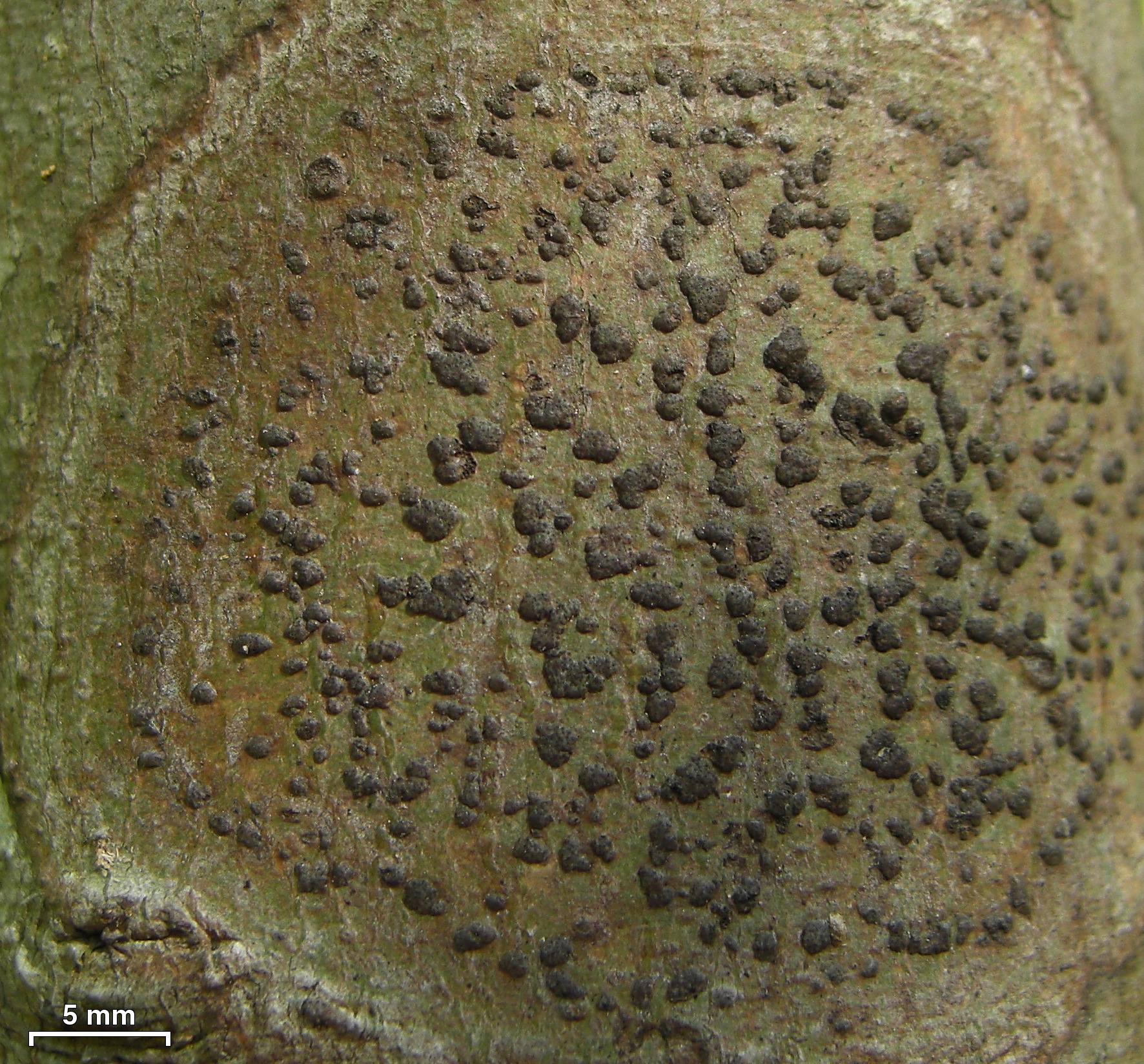
- Bathelium carolinianum in North Carolina, USA

Scientific classification
- Domain: Eukaryota
- Kingdom: Fungi
- Division: Ascomycota
- Class: Dothideomycetes
- Order: Trypetheliales
- Family: Trypetheliaceae
- Genus: Bathelium; Ach. (1803)

Type species
- Bathelium mastoideum Afzel. ex Ach. (1803)

= Bathelium =

Genus of lichens

Bathelium is a genus of lichen-forming fungi in the family Trypetheliaceae.

== Taxonomy ==
The genus was circumscribed in 1803 by Swedish lichenologist Erik Acharius, with Bathelium mastoideum assigned as the type species.

== Description ==
Genus Bathelium features a corticate thallus (a protective outer layer) usually with olive-green to brownish or greyish hues. This genus is distinguished by the form of its ascomata, the spore-producing structures, which possess apical ostioles (openings at the top). These ascomata can be found either singly or in groups, and often form pseudostromata, a stroma made of both thallus tissue and bits of host tissue. They are noticeable, ranging from prominent to sessile, and show a brown-black colouration, though in rare instances, they may have a whitish pruinose (powdery) appearance. This is complemented by a peripheral layer made up of tightly packed cells.

Within the ascomata, the hamathecium, a tissue layer containing filamentous structures, is clear and hyaline (translucent). It comprises thin, interconnecting filaments known as paraphysoids. The ascospores number from one to eight per ascus. They are transversely septate to muriform (divided into compartments by cross walls), with thin septa and more or less angular lumina. These spores are fusiform, meaning they have a spindle-like shape, with either acute (pointed) or rounded ends, and are not constricted at the median septum. They appear hyaline, do not react to iodine (IKI−), and are encased in a gelatinous sheath.

No conidiomata (structures responsible for asexual reproduction) have been identified in this genus. In terms of chemical properties, Bathelium frequently contains anthraquinones, compounds often present internally in pseudostromata. Lichexanthone, a fluorescent xanthone compound, is occasionally found within the genus.

== Species ==
- Bathelium albidoporum (Makhija & Patw.) R.C.Harris (1995)
- Bathelium austroafricanum (Zahlbr.) Aptroot & Lücking (2016)
- Bathelium boliviense Flakus & Aptroot (2016) – Bolivia
- Bathelium carolinianum (Tuck.) R.C.Harris (1995)
- Bathelium compositum (Vain.) C.W.Dodge (1953)
- Bathelium connivens (Nyl.) Trevis. (1861)
- Bathelium duplex (Fée) C.W.Dodge (1953)
- Bathelium flavostiolatum Flakus & Aptroot (2016) – Bolivia
- Bathelium inspersomastoideum Flakus & Aptroot (2016) – Bolivia
- Bathelium lineare (C.W.Dodge) R.C.Harris (1995)
- Bathelium madreporiforme (Eschw.) Trevis. (1852)
- Bathelium mastoideum Afzel. ex Ach. (1803)
- Bathelium megaleium Kremp. (1880)
- Bathelium meristosporum Mont. & Bosch (1861)
- Bathelium mirabile Flakus, Kukwa & Aptroot (2016) – Bolivia
- Bathelium nigroporum (Makhija & Patw.) Aptroot & Lücking (2016)
- Bathelium oligosporum (Mont. & Bosch) Trevis. (1861)
- Bathelium ostendatum (Kremp.) Müll.Arg. (1880)
- Bathelium phaeomelodes Müll.Arg. (1885)
- Bathelium porinosporum Lücking, M.P.Nelsen & Gueidan (2016)
- Bathelium pruinolucens Aptroot & Lücking (2016)
- Bathelium pruinosum Flakus, Kukwa & Aptroot (2016) – Bolivia
- Bathelium sphaericum (C.W.Dodge) R.C.Harris (1995)
- Bathelium subalbens (Nyl.) C.W.Dodge (1953)
- Bathelium sundaicum Müll.Arg. (1891)
- Bathelium tuberculosum (Makhija & Patw.) R.C.Harris (1995)
- Bathelium varium (Fée) Trevis. (1861)
- Bathelium velatum Müll.Arg. (1882)
