= Ascensión de Guarayos =

- Town
- Location within Bolivia
- Coordinates: 15°53′32″S 63°11′17″W
- Country: Bolivia
- Department: Santa Cruz Department
- Province: Guarayos Province
- Municipality: Ascensión de Guarayos Municipality
- Elevation: 827 ft (252 m)

Population (2010)
  - Total: 18,816
- Time zone: UTC-4 (BOT)
- Climate: Aw
- Website: https://web.archive.org/web/20101129173824/http://www.guarayos.gob.bo/

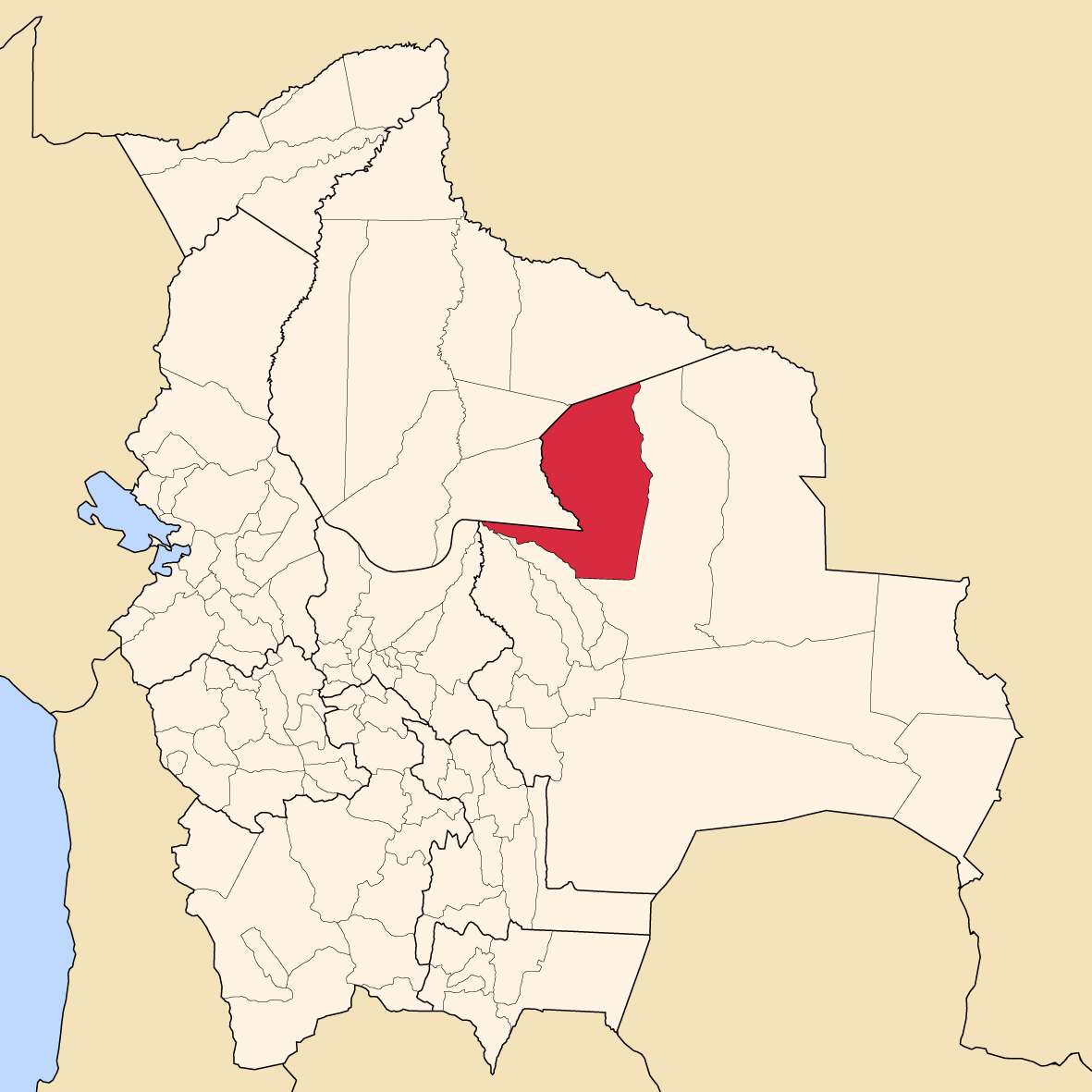
Map of Bolivia showing the Guarayos province, Santa Cruz

Ascensión de Guarayos is a town in Bolivia. In 2010 it had an estimated population of 18,816.

The town is served by Ascensión de Guarayos Airport.

== Climate ==
Climate data for Ascensión de Guarayos, elevation 247 m (810 ft)
Month	Jan	Feb	Mar	Apr	May	Jun	Jul	Aug	Sep	Oct	Nov	Dec	Year
Record high °C (°F)	36.8 (98.2)	36.7 (98.1)	36.5 (97.7)	36.4 (97.5)	36.8 (98.2)	33.9 (93.0)	35.1 (95.2)	38.4 (101.1)	40.6 (105.1)	40.4 (104.7)	38.8 (101.8)	39.5 (103.1)	40.6 (105.1)
Mean daily maximum °C (°F)	31.0 (87.8)	30.7 (87.3)	30.9 (87.6)	30.3 (86.5)	28.1 (82.6)	27.7 (81.9)	28.3 (82.9)	30.7 (87.3)	31.9 (89.4)	32.7 (90.9)	32.0 (89.6)	31.2 (88.2)	30.5 (86.8)
Daily mean °C (°F)	26.6 (79.9)	26.2 (79.2)	26.2 (79.2)	25.3 (77.5)	23.0 (73.4)	22.2 (72.0)	21.8 (71.2)	23.6 (74.5)	25.4 (77.7)	27.0 (80.6)	26.9 (80.4)	26.7 (80.1)	25.1 (77.1)
Mean daily minimum °C (°F)	22.2 (72.0)	21.8 (71.2)	21.5 (70.7)	20.2 (68.4)	18.0 (64.4)	16.6 (61.9)	15.3 (59.5)	16.6 (61.9)	18.9 (66.0)	21.2 (70.2)	21.8 (71.2)	22.2 (72.0)	19.7 (67.5)
Record low °C (°F)	13.6 (56.5)	14.5 (58.1)	10.2 (50.4)	10.7 (51.3)	6.0 (42.8)	4.7 (40.5)	4.5 (40.1)	4.0 (39.2)	7.8 (46.0)	12.7 (54.9)	11.4 (52.5)	13.4 (56.1)	4.0 (39.2)
Average precipitation mm (inches)	215.9 (8.50)	194.8 (7.67)	158.3 (6.23)	70.6 (2.78)	66.0 (2.60)	39.9 (1.57)	28.2 (1.11)	36.5 (1.44)	52.3 (2.06)	89.7 (3.53)	159.7 (6.29)	192.3 (7.57)	1,304.2 (51.35)
Average precipitation days	12.8	12.0	10.7	6.0	5.3	2.8	2.3	2.4	3.7	6.4	8.6	11.7	84.7
Average relative humidity (%)	84.6	85.8	85.4	83.3	81.8	81.1	74.9	69.2	65.7	74.8	77.3	84.0	79.0
Source: Servicio Nacional de Meteorología e Hidrología de Bolivia
