= Astrothelium campylocartilagineum =

Scientific classification
- Kingdom: Fungi
- Division: Ascomycota
- Class: Dothideomycetes
- Order: Trypetheliales
- Family: Trypetheliaceae
- Genus: Astrothelium
- Species: A. campylocartilagineum

Binomial name
- Astrothelium campylocartilagineum Aptroot & Lücking (2016)

Synonyms
- Campylothelium cartilagineum Vain. (1890)

Species of lichen-forming fungus

Astrothelium campylocartilagineum is a species of lichen in the family Trypetheliaceae. It forms olive-green patches with a distinctive bumpy, cartilage-like surface texture on tree bark in tropical forests. The species is characterized by solitary, dark fruiting bodies that are largely embedded within the lichen's thallus, each bearing separate spore-producing openings, and by exceptionally large spores divided into numerous compartments. It was formally established in 2016 when researchers assigned it a replacement scientific name to resolve a naming conflict, based on type material originally collected from southeastern Brazil in the nineteenth century.

== Taxonomy ==
Astrothelium campylocartilagineum was established as a new replacement name by André Aptroot and Robert Lücking to resolve a case of later homonymy involving Campylothelium cartilagineum, a species described by Edvard Vainio in 1890. The epithet cartilagineum had already been validly used earlier in Astrothelium, making a new name necessary when the species was transferred to that genus. The type material originates from southeastern Brazil (Minas Gerais), where it was collected by Vainio in 1885 and distributed in his Brazilian exsiccata Lichenes Brasilienses exsiccati 1891 (no. 1145). In earlier literature, this taxon was sometimes confused with other thick-thalline members of the Trypetheliaceae, but detailed examination of ascospore structure and hamathecial characters supports its recognition as a distinct species within Astrothelium.

== Description ==
The thallus of Astrothelium campylocartilagineum is corticate, olive-green in color, and distinctly uneven, with a warty to bullate surface that gives it a thickened, somewhat cartilaginous appearance. The ascomata are pleurothelioid and typically solitary, measuring about 0.7–1.0 mm in diameter. They are erumpent to prominent, mostly covered by thallus tissue, though the upper portions are often irregularly exposed and darkened. Each ascoma bears separate, eccentrically positioned ostioles.

Internally, the hamathecium is clear, lacking oil droplets or other inspersions. The asci contain two to four ascospores, which are large and densely muriform (multi-chambered), fusiform in shape, and hyaline. The spores measure approximately 120–175 μm in length and 38–50 μm in width and lack a distinctly thickened median septum. Standard spot tests are negative: the thallus and pseudostromata show no reactions under ultraviolet light or with potassium hydroxide solution, and thin-layer chromatography has not detected secondary metabolites.

== Habitat and distribution ==
The family Trypetheliaceae is almost exclusively tropical and largely epiphytic, with most species growing on bark and only a small minority occurring on other substrates. Within this family, Astrothelium campylocartilagineum has been reported from Brazil and Costa Rica.

In Trypetheliaceae more broadly, species are often encountered in (semi-)exposed settings such as the forest canopy as well as more open habitats, including savannas and dry forest, and these patterns have been compared with those of the similarly tropical family Graphidaceae.

== See also ==
- List of lichens of Brazil
