= Ríos Blanco y Negro Wildlife Reserve =

Protected area in Bolivia

Coordinates: 14°45′S 62°30′W

Rios Blanco y Negro Wildlife Reserve (Spanish: Reserva de Vida Silvestre Ríos Blanco y Negro, RVSRByN) is a departmental protected area in Ñuflo de Chávez and Guarayos provinces in the northern part of the Bolivian department of Santa Cruz. It covers portions of the municipalities of Concepción, Ascención de Guarayos, and Urubichá.

The reserve covers 1,400,000 hectares. As a wildlife reserve, according to the General Regulation on Protected Areas (Reglamento General de Áreas Protegidas), its purpose is "the protection, management, and sustainable use of wildlife."

Living in the vicinity of the protected area are the native Guarayo and Chiquitano peoples, who engage in such diverse traditional activities as berry picking, subsistence hunting and fishing, and farming. Their products are sold at the local market.

== Purpose ==
The reserve was created August 10, 1990, under Ministerial Resolution 139/90, with the purpose of "preserving biological diversity and promoting sustainable use of natural resources in an ecological and economically sustainable manner."

== Ecological characteristics ==
The reserve lies in a transition zone between the Chiquitano dry forests and the Madeira-Tapajós moist forests of the Amazon rainforest, with elements of both ecoregions, and it is of great conservational importance owing to its rich biodiversity. The San Pablo and Blanco Rivers are rich in nutrients and cause seasonal flooding in the areas closest to the plains, forming the so-called "Várzea forest", which regulate the rise and fall of the water levels.

The natural flood cycle in the reserve zone is essential to the maintenance of the Baures and Magdalena wetlands in Beni, in northern Bolivia.

Wood is extracted from the forest for construction, resins, fibers, fruit, and medicinal plants, which are of great important to the local population and for animals, such as the marayaú palm (Bactris major), the chontilla palm (Bactris gasipaes), Ampularia sp., big-leaf mahogany (Swietenia macrophylla), and the cusi palm (Attalea speciosa), among others.

== Threats ==
The primary threats to the integrity of the reserve are:

- illegal logging
- indiscriminate hunting and fishing
- agricultural advancement onto woodlands

The activities cause degradation of the forest's structure, leading to the loss of species of animal and plant life.
