= Urubichá =

Coordinates: 15°23′S 62°57′W

- Town
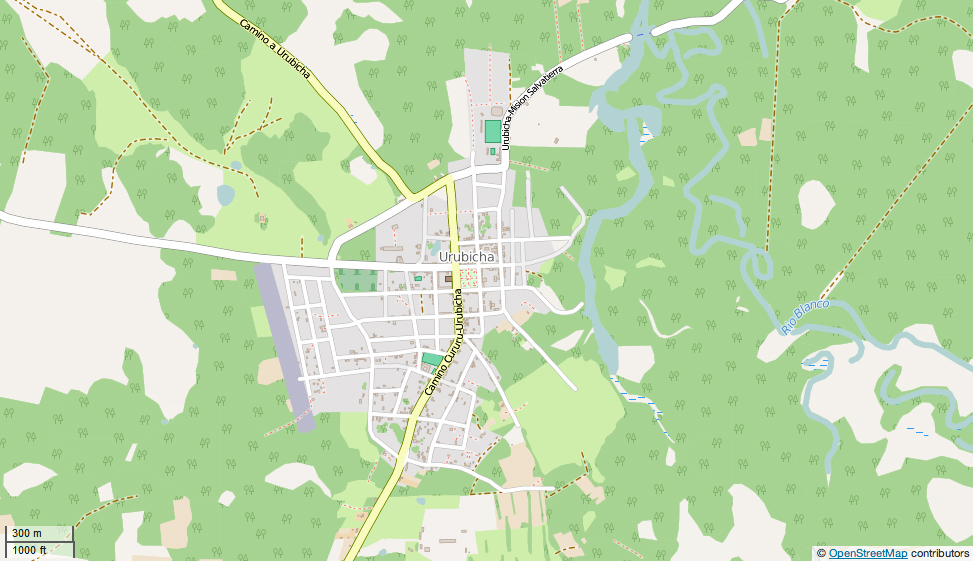
- Country: Bolivia
- Department: Santa Cruz
- Time zone: UTC-4 (BOT)
- Climate: Aw

Urubichá is a small town in Bolivia.
