= Guarayos Province =

Province in Bolivia

Provincia Guarayos
- Province
- Interactive map of Provincia Guarayos
- Coordinates: 15.333°S 63.500°W
- Country: Bolivia
- Department: Santa Cruz

Area
  - Total: 20,293 km^{2} (7,835 sq mi)

Population (2024)
  - Total: 57,744
  - Density: 2.8455/km^{2} (7.3698/sq mi)
- ISO 3166 code: BO.SC.GR

Guarayos is a province in the northwestern parts of the Bolivian Santa Cruz Department. Its capital is Ascención de Guarayos.

== Location ==
Guarayos is one of fifteen provinces in the Santa Cruz Department. It borders Beni Department in the north and northwest, Ichilo Province and Obispo Santistevan Province in the southwest, and Ñuflo de Chávez Province in the south and east.

The Province is situated between 13° 58' and 16° 30' south, and 62° 29' and 64° 44' west, its extension from east to west is up to 320 km, from north to west circa 380 km.

== Population ==
Part of the province is inhabited by an indigenous people, called Guarayos. The current indigenous inhabitants seem to have settled here beginning with the 16th century. The province's population went up from 17,697 (census 1992) to 31,577 (census 2001) and 38,448 (estimation 2005).

The latest census in Bolivia (2024) counted 57,744 people (53.200, aged 4 and over) in the province, out of which 1,507 were German-speaking Mennonites aged 4 and over or 2.8% of the entire population.

== Division ==
The province consists of three municipalities which are further subdivided into cantons.

Section	Municipality	Seat
1st	Ascención de Guarayos Municipality	Ascención de Guarayos
2nd	El Puente Municipality	El Puente
3rd	Urubichá Municipality	Urubichá

== See also ==
- San Jorge Lake
