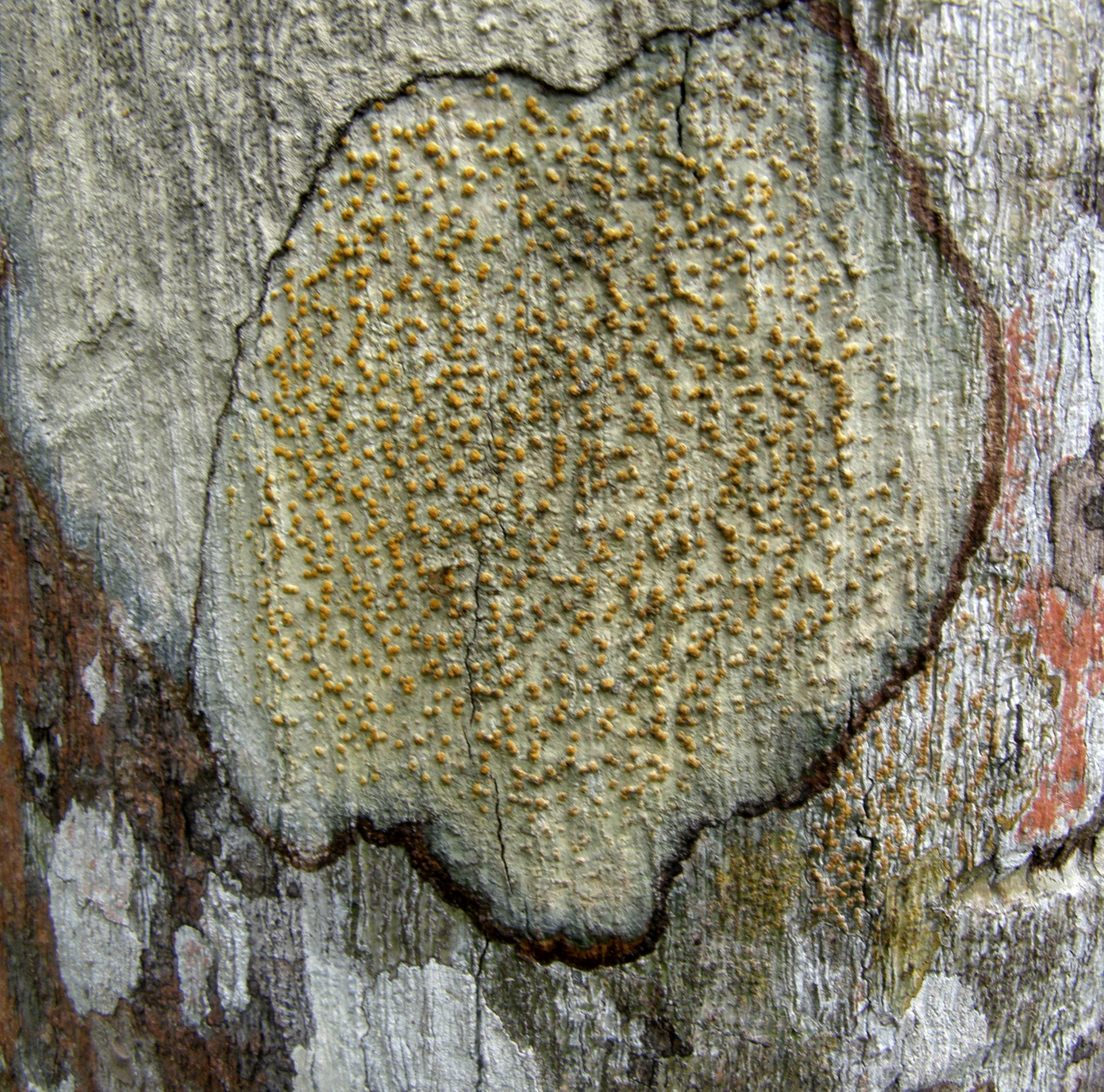

Scientific classification
- Kingdom: Fungi
- Division: Ascomycota
- Class: Dothideomycetes
- Order: Trypetheliales
- Family: Trypetheliaceae
- Genus: Trypethelium; Spreng. (1804)

Type species
- Trypethelium eluteriae Spreng. (1804)

Species
- See text

Synonyms
- Phyllothelium Trevis. (1861); Trypetheliomyces Cif. & Tomas. (1953)

= Trypethelium =

Genus of lichens

Trypethelium is a genus of lichenized fungi in the family Trypetheliaceae. The widespread genus contains about 50 species predominantly found in tropical areas. Trypethelium was circumscribed by German botanist Kurt Polycarp Joachim Sprengel in 1804.

== Species ==
- Trypethelium astroideum Flakus & Aptroot (2016) – Bolivia
- Trypethelium eluteriae Spreng. (1804)
- Trypethelium epileucodes Nyl. (1890)
- Trypethelium globolucidum Aptroot, L.I.Ferraro & M.Cáceres (2014)
- Trypethelium infraeluteriae Aptroot & Gueidan (2016)
- Trypethelium luteolucidum Aptroot, C.Mendonça & M.Cáceres (2016)
- Trypethelium medians Harm. (1911)
- Trypethelium muriforme Aptroot & M.F.Souza (2021) – Brazil
- Trypethelium papillosum Ach. (1814)
- Trypethelium tolimense Lücking, B.Moncada & M.C.Gut. (2016)
- Trypethelium variolosum Ach. (1814)
- Trypethelium xanthoplatystomum Flakus & Aptroot (2016) – Bolivia
