= List of lichens of Brazil =

Map of Brazil showing the states and the Federal District corresponding to the abbreviations used in this list: 1 AC (Acre), 2 AL (Alagoas), 3 AP (Amapá), 4 AM (Amazonas), 5 BA (Bahia), 6 CE (Ceará), 7 ES (Espírito Santo), 8 GO (Goiás), 9 MA (Maranhão), 10 MT (Mato Grosso), 11 MS (Mato Grosso do Sul), 12 MG (Minas Gerais), 13 PA (Pará), 14 PB (Paraíba), 15 PR (Paraná), 16 PE (Pernambuco), 17 PI (Piauí), 18 RJ (Rio de Janeiro), 19 RN (Rio Grande do Norte), 20 RS (Rio Grande do Sul), 21 RO (Rondônia), 22 RR (Roraima), 23 SC (Santa Catarina), 24 SP (São Paulo), 25 SE (Sergipe), 26 TO (Tocantins), and 27 DF (Federal District).

Brazil is recognised as having an exceptionally rich documented lichen biota. In 2025, a nationwide checklist by André Aptroot and co-authors accepted 4,828 Brazilian taxa, consisting of 4,799 species and 29 infraspecific taxa (that is, forms, varieties, and subspecies). This was about twice the number listed in the 2002 national checklist, a result of both intensified collecting in recent decades and renewed taxonomic scrutiny of previously reported names.

Brazilian lichen collecting has a long recorded history, but knowledge accumulated unevenly for much of that time. Early work was concentrated in a limited set of comparatively well-studied areas, especially Mato Grosso, Mato Grosso do Sul, São Paulo, Rio de Janeiro, and Rio Grande do Sul. The evidence assembled by Aptroot and colleagues suggests that roughly 10,000 specimens had been gathered by the beginning of the 20th century, much of them through the efforts of botanists such as Juan Ignacio Puiggari and Auguste François Marie Glaziou, followed later by important collections made by the lichenologists Gustaf Oskar Andersson Malme and Edvard August Vainio. Collection activity increased substantially during the 20th century, adding about 50,000 further specimens, and accelerated again in the 21st century as Brazilian specialists established research groups in different parts of the country and extended survey work much more widely.

Much of the recent rise in recorded diversity stems from the wider geographical coverage achieved over the last 15 years, as lichen surveys were extended across almost all Brazilian states. Aptroot and colleagues assembled their checklist from published records tied to specimens, drawing on older and newer literature, regional inventories, and postgraduate theses, rather than accepting names solely from online occurrence portals or herbarium databases. The work is focused on lichenized fungi, but it also includes a small number of closely related non-lichenized ascomycetes that have traditionally been treated by lichenologists; lichenicolous fungi (fungi that grow on lichens), which are often included in lichen checklists, were left outside its scope.

The present list is based on the accepted taxa treated by Aptroot et al. (2025), and additional reports published since then. The abbreviated codes following each species name show the Brazilian states from which that taxon has been reported, and in the source these acronyms are arranged by region in geographical sequence rather than alphabetically. A bolded "B" indicates that the name is based on original type material from Brazil. This list includes both fully accepted species and taxa treated as provisionally accepted. Where a name is marked "provisionally accepted", it is retained for practical use in the checklist even though its generic placement or final taxonomic treatment remains unsettled and may later be revised.

== A ==
- Absconditella sphagnorum – RJ
- Absconditella sychnogonoides – AL, BA, SP
- Absconditella termitariicola **B** – AP
- Absconditella viridithallina **B** – SP
- Acantholichen albomarginatus **B** – MG
- Acantholichen campestris **B** – SC
- Acanthothecis africana – RO
- Acanthothecis aggregata **B** – RO
- Acanthothecis albescens **B** – MG, SP
- Acanthothecis bicellulata **B** – MG
- Acanthothecis clavulifera **B** – MG
- Acanthothecis consocians – PB
- Acanthothecis corcovadensis **B** – AP, TO, PB, SE, BA, MS, RJ, SP, PR
- Acanthothecis farinosa **B** – AM, SE
- Acanthothecis hololeucoides – AP, SE, BA, MG, SP
- Acanthothecis kalbii **B** – PR
- Acanthothecis latispora **B** – RS
- Acanthothecis leucopepla – RO, AP, TO, MA, PB, PE, SE, BA, MT, MS, MG, SP
- Acanthothecis leucoxantha **B** – PE, MT, MS, SP
- Acanthothecis megalopora **B** – TO
- Acanthothecis mirabilis **B** – MG
- Acanthothecis mosquitensis **B** – PE
- Acanthothecis multiseptata **B** – SC
- Acanthothecis normuralis **B** – MS
- Acanthothecis norstictica **B** – TO
- Acanthothecis obscura **B** – MG
- Acanthothecis oryzoides **B** – RO
- Acanthothecis peplophora – AM
- Acanthothecis pruinocarpa **B** – PR
- Acanthothecis psoromica **B** – MS
- Acanthothecis rimosa **B** – AL
- Acanthothecis rosea – SC
- Acanthothecis roseola **B** – RS
- Acanthothecis sanguinoloba **B** – MT
- Acanthothecis sarcographoides **B** – SE
- Acanthothecis saxicola **B** – MA
- Acanthothecis silicicola – MT
- Acanthothecis subabaphoides **B** – RO, TO, CE, SE, BA, MT
- Acanthothecis subfarinosa **B** – PR, RS
- Acanthothecis submuriformis **B** – RO
- Acanthothecis tetraphora – MA, BA, SP
- Acanthotrema brasilianum **B** – AC, AM, RO, AL, SE, BA, MT, MS, GO, MG, ES, SP
- Acanthotrema minus **B** – MS
- Acanthotrema sorediatum **B** – MG
- Acarospora aggregata **B** – PE
- Acarospora chrysops – PE, MG, ES, RJ, RS
- Acarospora dissipata **B** – AL, RS
- Acarospora lavicola – MS
- Acarospora lorentzii – SP, RS
- Acarospora moenium – MT
- Acarospora obnubila – MS
- Acarospora oligyrophorica **B** – AL, MT, MG
- Acarospora privigna – PE
- Acarospora regnelliana **B** – RS
- Acarospora scabrida – SC
- Acarospora schleicheri – RS
- Acarospora scotica – RJ, SP, SC
- Acarospora smaragdula – MG, SC
- Acarospora terricola – RS
- Acarospora terrigena – MG, RS
- Acarospora veronensis – PR
- Aciculopsora cinerea **B** – AL
- Acrocordia endobrya **B** – SP
- Actinoplaca ampullifera – BA
- Actinoplaca strigulacea – AM, PA, AP, PB, PE, AL, MT, MS, ES, SP, SC
- Adelphomyces cochlearifer – AC, AM, RO, PE, AL, SE, SP
- Adelphomyces epithallina – RJ
- Aderkomyces carneoalbus **B** – RJ, SP
- Aderkomyces couepiae **B** – AM
- Aderkomyces microtrichus **B** – PE, RJ
- Aderkomyces papilliferus – AM, PE, BA, SC
- Aggregatorygma isidiata **B** – AP
- Aggregatorygma lichexanthonicum **B** – MT
- Aggregatorygma submuriforme **B** – MS
- Aggregatorygma triseptatum **B** – AM, RO, PA, TO, MT
- Agonimia allobata – MG, SP
- Agonimia octospora – MG
- Agonimia opuntiella – CE, AL, SE, BA, MS, MG, ES, PR, SC, RS
- Agonimia pacifica – SE, SP, SC
- Agonimia tenuiloba – AM, RO, SE, MT, MS, SP, PR, SC
- Agonimia tristicula – RO, PE, BA, MT, MS, MG, PR, RS
- Ainoa mooreana – MG, RJ, SP
- Allographa acharii – AC, AM, RO, AP, CE, PE, AL, SE, BA, MT, MS, GO, DF, MG, RJ, SP, PR, SC, RS
- Allographa adpressa **B** – MA, CE, MG, RS
- Allographa albotecta **B** – BA, SP, RS
- Allographa amazonica **B** – RO
- Allographa ancelina **B** – AP
- Allographa anguilliradians – MT, MS, ES, PR
- Allographa angustata **B** – AM, PA, PE, SE, BA, MT, MS, MG, RJ, SP, PR
- Allographa apertoinspersa – PR, RS
- Allographa apicalinspersa **B** – RS
- Allographa argentata – PA, PE, AL, SE, BA, MT, MS, MG, SP, PR, SC
- Allographa asterizans – RO
- Allographa atrocelata – MA
- Allographa balbisii – AC, AM, PB, SE, MT, ES, RJ, SP, SC, RS
- Allographa basaltica **B** – RJ
- Allographa brachylirellata **B** – AM, RO, PA, MT
- Allographa brevissima **B** – PE, BA, MG, ES, RJ, SP, SC, RS
- Allographa byrsonimae **B** – MT
- Allographa calcea – AM, PE, MT, MS, RJ, PR, SC, RS
- Allographa carassensis **B** – AL, BA, MG
- Allographa celata – SE
- Allographa cerradensis **B** – AL, SP
- Allographa chamelensis – ES
- Allographa chloroalba – BA
- Allographa chlorocarpa – PE, AL, SE, ES, SP, PR, SC, RS
- Allographa chrysocarpa **B** – AC, AM, PA, PE, SE, BA, MT, ES, RJ, SP, PR, SC, RS
- Allographa cinerea – PE, SE, RJ, SP, PR, SC
- Allographa cognata – SE
- Allographa comma – BA, MT, MS, RJ
- Allographa congesta **B** – AM
- Allographa consanguinea **B** – SE, BA, MT, MG, RJ, SP, PR, SC, RS
- Allographa contorta **B** – RJ, SC, RS
- Allographa cylindrospora **B** – PB
- Allographa dealbata **B** – PE, MG, ES, RJ, SP, PR, RS
- Allographa dispersa **B** – MT
- Allographa dolichographa – ES, RS
- Allographa elongata – RN, PE, MG, ES, RJ, SP, PR, SC, RS
- Allographa farinulenta – PR
- Allographa flavens – AM
- Allographa fournieri – SP
- Allographa frumentaria – MT, MG, RJ, SP
- Allographa funilina **B** – CE, PB, AL, MG, RS
- Allographa glauconigra – CE, AL, RS
- Allographa globosa – MG
- Allographa granulata – SE, RJ, RS
- Allographa heteroplaca **B** – SC
- Allographa hossei – PR, RS
- Allographa hypostictica **B** – MG
- Allographa illinata **B** – PA, MT, MG, RJ, SC
- Allographa ingarum – MA, CE, AL, BA, MS, ES, RS
- Allographa inturgescens **B** – MT, RJ
- Allographa invisibilis **B** – SP, PR, RS
- Allographa itatiaiensis **B** – MG
- Allographa laubertiana – AC, CE, AL, SE, MS, RJ
- Allographa leptospora – RJ
- Allographa lineatipruinosa **B** – AM
- Allographa longula **B** – AM, PE, AL, RJ, PR, RS
- Allographa lourdesina **B** – MG
- Allographa lumbricina **B** – PE, SE, BA
- Allographa malacodes – SE
- Allographa marginata **B** – PB, SE, RJ, SP
- Allographa medioinspersa **B** – MS
- Allographa mexicana – MG, SP
- Allographa miniata **B** – SE, BA, SP
- Allographa multisulcata **B** – SP
- Allographa nana – RO
- Allographa nuda – RJ
- Allographa nudiformis – SE
- Allographa obtectostriata **B** – MS, ES, RJ, SP, PR, RS
- Allographa ochracea – RS
- Allographa olivacea **B** – MT, RS
- Allographa oryzaeformis – PA, MA, BA, MG, SC
- Allographa ovata – RJ
- Allographa oxyspora – SC, RS
- Allographa pavoniana – PA, PB, PE, AL, SE, BA, MS, RJ, SP, SC, RS
- Allographa pedunculata – SE
- Allographa phaeospora **B** – BA, MG, RJ, SC, RS
- Allographa pilarensis **B** – RO, AL, SE
- Allographa pitmanii – AM, RO, AP, SE, BA, MT
- Allographa pittieri – PR
- Allographa platypoda **B** – SP
- Allographa plumbea – RS
- Allographa plurispora **B** – MT, PR, RS
- Allographa polystriata – PR
- Allographa pruinodisca **B** – MT
- Allographa pseudocinerea – PE, RS
- Allographa pseudoserpens – AP, PR, RS
- Allographa rhizicola – AM, PA, PE, SE, BA, MT, MS, MG, ES, RJ, SP, PR, SC, RS
- Allographa rimulosa – MA, RN, MT, MS, MG, SC, RS
- Allographa rufopallida – AM, TO, ES, RJ, RS
- Allographa ruiziana – MT, MG, RJ
- Allographa rustica – RO, SE
- Allographa sauroidea **B** – AM, PA, MT, GO, RJ
- Allographa sayeri – MA, SE, BA
- Allographa scaphella – State unknown
- Allographa seminuda – AL, PR
- Allographa sitiana **B** – AM, RO, CE, PB, SE, BA, MS, MG, ES, PR, RS
- Allographa striatula – AM, RO, AP, TO, RN, PB, PE, SE, BA, MT, MS, MG, ES, RJ, SP, PR, SC, RS
- Allographa subargentata **B** – PR, SC
- Allographa subdisserpens – CE, RS
- Allographa subflexibilis – PB, SE
- Allographa subimmersa – MG, PR
- Allographa subradiata – MS, MG, PR, SC
- Allographa subserpens **B** – MT, MG
- Allographa subturgidula – SE, RS
- Allographa superans – RS
- Allographa tetrinspersa **B** – MT
- Allographa triangularis **B** – SP
- Allographa tricolorata **B** – RS
- Allographa tumidula – RJ, SP, PR
- Allographa uruguayensis – PR
- Allographa variopruinata **B** – AM
- Allographa verminosa – MS
- Allographa vernicosa – RO, RJ
- Allographa vestita – PR
- Allographa vestitoides – AC, PB, PE, SE, MT, MS, SP, PR, RS
- Alyxoria cyanea **B** – MS
- Alyxoria fuscospora **B** – RO
- Alyxoria ochrocheila – SP
- Alyxoria varia – CE, RN, AL, BA, MS, RJ, SC, RS
- Amandinea brugierae – BA
- Amandinea diorista – CE, RN, SE, BA, MT
- Amandinea endachroa **B** – PE, GO, RJ, SP, SC, RS
- Amandinea errata **B** – CE, MG, SC, RS
- Amandinea extenuata – PA, CE, PB, PE, SE, BA, MT, MS, DF, MG, RJ, SC, RS
- Amandinea melaxanthella – RN, PB, AL, BA, GO
- Amandinea microsticta – MS, RJ, SP, SC
- Amandinea multispora – SE, BA, SP, RS
- Amandinea pelidna – SC
- Amandinea polyspora – MG, RJ, RS
- Amandinea subduplicata **B** – CE, PE, MS, MG, RJ, SP
- Amandinea submontana – BA, MS, ES, RS
- Amandinea turgescens – RN
- Amandinea xylographella – PE, MS, SP
- Amazonomyces sprucei **B** – AM, PA
- Amazonotrema nigrum **B** – AM, RO
- Ampliotrema amplius – AC, AM, RO, PA, AP, PE, SE, MT, SP
- Ampliotrema auratum – SE, RJ
- Ampliotrema dactylizum – AM, RO
- Ampliotrema lepadinoides **B** – AM, RO, PA, AP, BA
- Ampliotrema megalostomum **B** – AM, PA
- Ampliotrema palaeoamplius – AM, RO, MT
- Ampliotrema rimosum – AM
- Amygdalaria pelobotryon – MG
- Ancistrosporella psoromica – SC
- Andreiomyces obtusaticus **B** – PE, MT
- Anisomeridium adnexum **B** – SP, SC, RS
- Anisomeridium albisedum – RO, CE, PB, SE, MS, RS
- Anisomeridium americanum – AL, SE, BA, MG
- Anisomeridium anisolobum **B** – RN, SE, BA, MS, SP, SC, RS
- Anisomeridium biforme – SE, MS, RJ
- Anisomeridium biformoides – PE
- Anisomeridium consobrinum – RJ
- Anisomeridium distans – MS
- Anisomeridium excaecariae – BA, SP
- Anisomeridium excellens – SE
- Anisomeridium foliicola – AM, RO, PA, PB, PE, AL, SE, BA, MT, ES, SP, PR, SC
- Anisomeridium globosum **B** – SE, MS
- Anisomeridium guttuliferum – MS
- Anisomeridium lateriticum **B** – RO
- Anisomeridium leptospermum – AM, PE, SE, SP, RS
- Anisomeridium leucochlorum – SE
- Anisomeridium musaesporoides – AM, RO, PA
- Anisomeridium polycarpum – PE, AL
- Anisomeridium polypori – MA, AL, SE, BA
- Anisomeridium prolongatum – PE
- Anisomeridium subnectendum – BA, SP, SC, RS
- Anisomeridium subprostans – PE, AL, SE, MT, MS, RS
- Anisomeridium tamarindi – CE, PB, PE, SE, MS, RS
- Anisomeridium terminatum – PA, SE
- Anisomeridium triseptatum **B** – RO
- Anisomeridium truncatum **B** – SE, SP
- Anomomorpha aggregans – AC, PE
- Anomomorpha sordida **B** – AM, RO, BA, MT, MS, SP, PR
- Anomomorpha subtorquens – RO
- Anomomorpha turbulenta – AM, AP, PE, SE, MT, RJ, SP, PR
- Anthracothecium australiense – RN, SE
- Anthracothecium macrosporum – AL, SC
- Anthracothecium prasinum **B** – AC, AM, PA, RN, SE, BA, MT, MS, MG, SP, SC
- Aplanocalenia inconspicua **B** – SP
- Appressodiscus badius **B** – AM, MS
- Appressodiscus isidiobadius **B** – AM
- Aptrootidea amapensis **B** – AM, AP
- Aptrootidea atrofusca – PE, MG
- Aptrootidea marginata – PB, PE, AL, RJ
- Architrypethelium grande **B** – AM, RJ
- Architrypethelium hyalinum – PE
- Architrypethelium lauropaluanum **B** – BA, MG, SP, SC
- Architrypethelium nitens – SE, MG, RJ, SP
- Architrypethelium submuriforme **B** – MG
- Architrypethelium uberinum – PE, MG, RJ
- Arctomia fascicularis – MS, RS
- Arthonia abnormis – RJ
- Arthonia accolens **B** – AM, RO, PA, CE, PB, PE, BA, MT, RJ, SP, RS
- Arthonia acharii – State unknown
- Arthonia aciniformis **B** – AC, AM, RO, PA, PE, SE, BA, MT, RJ, SP
- Arthonia andamanica – PB, SE, BA
- Arthonia antillarum – AC, RO, AP, TO, CE, PB, PE, AL, SE, MT, MS, MG, RJ, RS
- Arthonia araucariae **B** – RO, SE, MG
- Arthonia atra – MG, RJ
- Arthonia biseptata **B** – RO, AP, MS, RJ
- Arthonia catillaria **B** – MG
- Arthonia cerei **B** – RJ
- Arthonia cinnamomea – MT
- Arthonia circumalbicans – PE
- Arthonia complanata – AM, RO, MA, PB, PE, AL, SE, BA, MS, MG, RJ, SC
- Arthonia consimilis **B** – MG
- Arthonia crystallifera – SC
- Arthonia cyanea **B** – AC, AM, RO, PA, PB, PE, BA, MT, MS, MG, ES, RJ, SP, SC
- Arthonia epidendri **B** – RO, RJ
- Arthonia farinosorediata **B** – SE
- Arthonia fissurinella **B** – RJ
- Arthonia flavidosanguinea **B** – RJ
- Arthonia gracilis **B** – PA, BA
- Arthonia hepatica – State unknown
- Arthonia interducta – RJ
- Arthonia interveniens – AL
- Arthonia lecythidicola **B** – PA, AP, PB, PE, BA, SP
- Arthonia leptosperma **B** – AM, RO, PA, PE, AL, SE, BA, MT, SP
- Arthonia mediella – AM
- Arthonia meissneri – AC, AM, RO, AP, BA, MT, MS, MG, SC
- Arthonia microsperma – AM, PE, AL, SE
- Arthonia minutella **B** – AP, RJ
- Arthonia mira – AM, PB, PE, BA, RJ, SP, RS
- Arthonia muelleri **B** – MG
- Arthonia nigratula **B** – SP
- Arthonia novella **B** – RJ
- Arthonia obesa **B** – AM
- Arthonia obscurata **B** – MG, RS
- Arthonia octolocularis **B** – MG
- Arthonia orbignyae – AC, AM, RO
- Arthonia palmulacea **B** – AC, AM, RO, PA, PE, BA, MT, SP
- Arthonia parantillarum – AC, AM, RO, AP, TO, MA, PI, CE, RN, PB, AL, SE, BA, MS, GO, ES, SC
- Arthonia pellucida **B** – BA
- Arthonia perpallens – PE, RJ
- Arthonia pinastri – SE
- Arthonia platygraphidea – PE, AL, SE, RJ, RS
- Arthonia pluriseptata **B** – MG, RS
- Arthonia polygramma – PE
- Arthonia polymorpha – BA, RJ
- Arthonia polymorphula **B** – SE, RJ
- Arthonia polystigmatea **B** – RJ
- Arthonia puiggarii **B** – SP
- Arthonia punctiformis – CE, SE
- Arthonia quatuorseptata **B** – MG, RJ, SP, RS
- Arthonia redingeri – RO, AL
- Arthonia rubella – PE, SP
- Arthonia rugosula **B** – AP, CE, SE, RJ
- Arthonia saxatilis **B** – MG
- Arthonia saxistellata **B** – BA
- Arthonia scitula **B** – AM, BA, RJ
- Arthonia sideralis – RJ
- Arthonia spadicea – PE, MS
- Arthonia stipitata **B** – CE
- Arthonia subconveniens – State unknown
- Arthonia subgrisea **B** – SC
- Arthonia submiserula **B** – RO, MG, RJ
- Arthonia subnovella **B** – SP
- Arthonia subvelata – PE
- Arthonia torulosa – RJ
- Arthonia trailii **B** – AM
- Arthonia trilocularis – AM, RO, PA, PE, AL, MT
- Arthonia xanthopycnidiata **B** – AM
- Arthopyrenia cinereopruinosa – SP
- Arthopyrenia meizospora – SP (provisionally accepted)
- Arthopyrenia minuscula **B** – SP (provisionally accepted)
- Arthotheliopsis corticola **B** – BA
- Arthotheliopsis hymenocarpoides – AM, PB
- Arthotheliopsis planicarpus – AM, PB, PE, BA, SP
- Arthotheliopsis serusiauxii – PE, MG
- Arthotheliopsis tricharioides **B** – PE, BA, SP, PR
- Arthothelium atropurpureum **B** – BA
- Arthothelium bessale – AM, RO, PB, PE, AL, SE, BA
- Arthothelium chiodectoides – AL, SE
- Arthothelium cinerascens **B** – RJ
- Arthothelium distentum – SE
- Arthothelium effusum **B** – MG, SC
- Arthothelium endoxanthum **B** – SP, SC
- Arthothelium fuscocinereum – State unknown
- Arthothelium hysterellum – State unknown
- Arthothelium macrothecum – AM, RO, SE, BA, SP, SC
- Arthothelium nobile **B** – SP
- Arthothelium nucis **B** – SP
- Arthothelium spectabile – PE, SE, SP
- Arthrorhaphis alpina – RS
- Arthrorhaphis citrinella – PE, BA, MG, SP
- Aspicilia cinerea – MG, RJ, SC
- Aspidothelium cinerascens **B** – AL, BA, MT, MS, MG, RJ, SP, PR, SC
- Aspidothelium cuyabensis **B** – MT, RS
- Aspidothelium fugiens **B** – AM, PA, PE, SE, MT, MS, MG, SP, SC
- Aspidothelium geminiparum – AC, AM, RO, PE, MS, SP, SC, RS
- Aspidothelium glabrum – RO, PA, SE, MS, SC
- Aspidothelium macrosporum **B** – RJ
- Aspidothelium ornatum – MT, SC
- Aspidothelium scutellicarpum – PA, PE, BA, MG, SP, RS
- Aspidothelium submuriforme – SE
- Aspidothelium trichothelioides – RO, BA
- Asteristion platycarpoides – RO, SE
- Asteristion platycarpum – SE, SP
- Asterothyrium anomalum **B** – MS, SP
- Asterothyrium argenteum **B** – PE, MS, SP, SC
- Asterothyrium aspidospermatis **B** – MG
- Asterothyrium decipiens **B** – PE, MS, RJ, SC
- Asterothyrium filiforme **B** – RJ
- Asterothyrium hedbergii **B** – PE, SP
- Asterothyrium leptosporum – RS
- Asterothyrium leucophthalmum – PE, MG, RJ, SP, RS
- Asterothyrium microsporum – PB, PE, SE, MS, ES, RJ, SP, PR, SC, RS
- Asterothyrium monosporum **B** – PE, MS, MG, SP, PR, SC
- Asterothyrium pernambucense **B** – PE
- Asterothyrium pittieri – PE, PR, SC
- Asterothyrium rondoniense **B** – AM, RO, PA
- Asterothyrium rotuliforme – AM, PA, PE, RJ, SP, RS
- Asterothyrium tetrasporum – PE
- Asterothyrium umbilicatum – MA, PE
- Asterothyrium uniseptatum – PE
- Astrochapsa asteroidea – AC, AM, PE, SE, BA
- Astrochapsa calathiformis – AM
- Astrochapsa graphidioides **B** – AM, RO, MT
- Astrochapsa inspersa **B** – PB, PE
- Astrochapsa meridensis – SC
- Astrochapsa platycarpella **B** – AM, RO, PA, AP, RN, PB, PE, AL, SE
- Astrochapsa pseudophlyctis – RO, BA, MT
- Astrochapsa stellata – PE
- Astrochapsa submuralis **B** – PB
- Astrochapsa zahlbruckneri **B** – MT, RJ, SP, RS
- Astrothelium aenascens – BA, MT, MS
- Astrothelium aeneoides **B** – AM, PA, PB, BA, MS, MG
- Astrothelium aeneum **B** – AC, AM, RO, PA, AP, TO, MA, CE, PB, PE, AL, SE, BA, MT, MS, GO, MG, ES, RJ, SP, PR, SC
- Astrothelium amazonum **B** – AM
- Astrothelium ambiguum **B** – MT, ES
- Astrothelium annulare – AM, MT, RJ
- Astrothelium astrolucidum **B** – AM, TO
- Astrothelium aurantioseptemseptatum **B** – AM
- Astrothelium auratum **B** – AC, SE
- Astrothelium aureoirregulare **B** – MG, ES, SC
- Astrothelium aureomaculatum **B** – AM, MG
- Astrothelium bicolor – AM, RO, PA, AP, MA, CE, RN, PE, AL, SE, BA, MT, MG, RJ, SP, SC, RS
- Astrothelium bivelum **B** – RO
- Astrothelium buckii **B** – AM, MT
- Astrothelium bulbosum **B** – AM
- Astrothelium bullatum – AP
- Astrothelium campylocartilagineum **B** – MG, ES, SP
- Astrothelium carassense **B** – MG
- Astrothelium cartilagineum – RO, AP, BA, MT, SP, SC
- Astrothelium cecidiogenum – RS
- Astrothelium ceratinum – AM, AP, AL, MG, SC
- Astrothelium chapadense **B** – AM, MT, RS
- Astrothelium cinereum – AC
- Astrothelium cinnamomeum **B** – AC, AM, PA, AP, TO, MA, PB, PE, SE, BA, MT, MS, MG, ES, SC
- Astrothelium citrisporum **B** – BA
- Astrothelium coloratum **B** – AM
- Astrothelium confluens **B** – RJ, SP, SC, RS
- Astrothelium consimile – AC, RO
- Astrothelium corallinum **B** – AM
- Astrothelium crassum – AM, RO, RR, PA, AP, SE, BA, MT, MG, SP, SC, RS
- Astrothelium croceum **B** – BA, MT, MG
- Astrothelium cryptolucens – AM
- Astrothelium curvatum **B** – SE
- Astrothelium curvisporum **B** – RO
- Astrothelium decemseptatum **B** – RO
- Astrothelium defossum – RO
- Astrothelium degenerans – PA, AP, MA, CE, SE, BA, SP, PR
- Astrothelium dimidioinspersum **B** – AM
- Astrothelium disjunctum **B** – AM, RO, BA, MT
- Astrothelium duplicatum **B** – RO, MT
- Astrothelium elixii – MT
- Astrothelium endochryseum **B** – MG, SP, SC
- Astrothelium eumultiseptatum **B** – RO, MT
- Astrothelium eustominspersum **B** – BA
- Astrothelium eustomum – AC, AM, RO, TO, RN, PB, PE, SE, BA, MT, ES, PR
- Astrothelium eustomurale **B** – AC, AM, RO, AP, MT
- Astrothelium feei – AM, PA, PE, SE
- Astrothelium fernandae **B** – MS
- Astrothelium ferrugineum – PA
- Astrothelium flavocrystallinum **B** – MG
- Astrothelium flavoduplex **B** – AM, RO, AP, AL, MT
- Astrothelium flavogigasporum **B** – BA
- Astrothelium flavoinspersum **B** – ES
- Astrothelium flavomeristoporum **B** – AM, AP
- Astrothelium flavomurisporum **B** – RO, PA, SP
- Astrothelium flavostromatum **B** – RO
- Astrothelium flavum **B** – RO
- Astrothelium floridanum – AM, PB, BA, MT, SC
- Astrothelium gigantosporum – AP
- Astrothelium gigasporum **B** – AM, RR
- Astrothelium globosum **B** – AM, SE, BA
- Astrothelium graphicum **B** – PA
- Astrothelium grossum – PB
- Astrothelium gyalostiolatum **B** – MT
- Astrothelium infravulcanum **B** – AC
- Astrothelium inspersaeneum **B** – AC, AM, RO, AP, MA, CE, PB, PE, SE, BA, MT, MS
- Astrothelium inspersonitidulum **B** – MG
- Astrothelium inspersonovemseptatum **B** – AM
- Astrothelium inspersotuberculosum – AC, AM
- Astrothelium insulare **B** – AM
- Astrothelium interjectum **B** – AM, RO, PB, SE, SC
- Astrothelium intermedium – AM
- Astrothelium introflavidum **B** – AM, PA
- Astrothelium irregulare **B** – SC
- Astrothelium isabellinum **B** – PA
- Astrothelium kunzei – AC, AM, PA, MA, AL, SE, MT, MS, MG, SP
- Astrothelium laevigatum **B** – MG, SP, SC
- Astrothelium laevithallinum **B** – BA, MT, MG, ES, SP
- Astrothelium laureroides **B** – AM
- Astrothelium leioplacum – PB, BA
- Astrothelium leucoconicum **B** – RJ
- Astrothelium leucosessile – AM, RN, PB, BA, MS, RS
- Astrothelium leucothelium – AC, PE, ES, SC
- Astrothelium lineatum **B** – AP
- Astrothelium longisporum **B** – SE
- Astrothelium macrocarpum – AC, AM, RO, PA, AP, PB, SE, BA, MT, MS, GO, MG, ES, PR, SC, RS
- Astrothelium macrostomoides **B** – MG, ES
- Astrothelium macrostomum **B** – MG
- Astrothelium macrostromaticum **B** – ES
- Astrothelium marcidum – SE, BA, PR
- Astrothelium marjoleinae **B** – AM
- Astrothelium meandratum **B** – AM
- Astrothelium medioincrassatum **B** – BA
- Astrothelium megaeneum – AM, BA
- Astrothelium megalophthalmum **B** – BA, SC
- Astrothelium megalostomum **B** – MG, RS
- Astrothelium megaspermum – PE, AL, SE, BA, MS, MG, ES, SP, PR, SC
- Astrothelium megeustomum **B** – MS, PR, SC, RS
- Astrothelium megeustomurale **B** – AM, RO, TO
- Astrothelium meiophorum – PB
- Astrothelium mesoduplex **B** – AC, AM, RO, AP, TO, MT
- Astrothelium miniannulare **B** – RJ
- Astrothelium multireflexum **B** – AM
- Astrothelium muriconicum **B** – MT
- Astrothelium myopicum **B** – AM
- Astrothelium neogalbineum **B** – AM, RO, PA, CE, PB, PE, PR
- Astrothelium neoinspersum – TO, PB, BA, MS, PR
- Astrothelium neovariolosum – AM, MT
- Astrothelium nicaraguense – AM
- Astrothelium nigratum – TO, MT, MG, SP
- Astrothelium nigricans **B** – AC, AM, MT
- Astrothelium nigrum **B** – RO
- Astrothelium nitidiusculum – AM, RO, PA, AP, TO, RN, PB, PE, AL, SE, BA, MT, MS, MG, SP, SC, RS
- Astrothelium norisianum – PA, MT
- Astrothelium novemseptatum **B** – AM, RO
- Astrothelium obscurum **B** – AM, RO, BA, MT, MG, ES, SP, PR, SC
- Astrothelium obtectum **B** – MG, ES
- Astrothelium ocellatum **B** – BA, MT, PR
- Astrothelium ochraceum **B** – MS
- Astrothelium ochroleucoides **B** – AM, RO, AP, MT
- Astrothelium ochrothelium – AC, AM, RO, PB, SE, BA, MT, MG
- Astrothelium octoseptatum **B** – RO
- Astrothelium octosporoides **B** – RJ, SC
- Astrothelium octosporum **B** – MG, SP, SC, RS
- Astrothelium pallidoflavum – AM
- Astrothelium papulosum – AM, AP, BA, SC
- Astrothelium parabathelium **B** – AM
- Astrothelium parathelioides **B** – MT
- Astrothelium phlyctaena – AC, AM, PA, AP, MA, PB, PE, AL, SE, BA, MT, MS, GO, MG, ES, RJ, PR, SC, RS
- Astrothelium pictum **B** – MG
- Astrothelium pleiostomum **B** – AM, RR
- Astrothelium porosum – RO, AP, CE, PB, PE, AL, SE, BA, MT, MG, RJ, SP, RS
- Astrothelium pseudocyphellatum **B** – AM
- Astrothelium pseudodermatodes **B** – MS
- Astrothelium pseudoplatystomum **B** – SP
- Astrothelium puiggarii **B** – AM, RO, SE, BA, RJ, SP, SC, RS
- Astrothelium pulcherrimum – PA, AP, TO, PE, MT, MG, SP
- Astrothelium punctulatum **B** – PA, AP, MT
- Astrothelium pupula – AM, AP, MT, MG
- Astrothelium purpurascens – RR
- Astrothelium pyrenastrosulphureum – AM, BA
- Astrothelium quasimamillanum **B** – RO
- Astrothelium quatuorseptatum **B** – RO, BA
- Astrothelium quintannulare **B** – MG
- Astrothelium quintosulphureum **B** – AM
- Astrothelium rhinothallinum **B** – RJ
- Astrothelium robustosporum **B** – RO, MG
- Astrothelium robustum – AC, AM
- Astrothelium rubrocrystallinum **B** – AC, AP, SE, BA
- Astrothelium rubrostiolatum **B** – AM
- Astrothelium rufescens – AC, AM, PA, AP, TO, PB, AL, BA, MT, MS, MG, SC
- Astrothelium sanguinarium **B** – BA, MT, MS
- Astrothelium sanguineoxanthum **B** – MT
- Astrothelium saxicola **B** – MT
- Astrothelium scoria – AM, AP, RN, PE, AL, SE, BA, MT, MS, RJ, PR, SC
- Astrothelium scorioides – AC, AM, RO, PE, SE, BA, MT
- Astrothelium scoriothelium **B** – AM, SC
- Astrothelium septiconicum **B** – MT, MS
- Astrothelium sepultum – AM, TO, SE, BA, MT, MG, RJ
- Astrothelium simplex **B** – MT, SC, RS
- Astrothelium sinuosum **B** – SC
- Astrothelium sipmanii – AM
- Astrothelium solitarium **B** – RO, BA
- Astrothelium sordithecium **B** – MG
- Astrothelium sphaerioides – AM, PE, BA
- Astrothelium squamosum **B** – MG
- Astrothelium stellare **B** – AM, MT
- Astrothelium stramineum **B** – MT
- Astrothelium stromatocinnamomeum **B** – MG
- Astrothelium stromatofluorescens **B** – AM, RO, BA, MT, MS
- Astrothelium studerae **B** – AL
- Astrothelium subaequans – PE
- Astrothelium subcatervarium **B** – MT
- Astrothelium subclandestinum **B** – AM, MS
- Astrothelium subdiscretum – RN, PB
- Astrothelium subdisjunctum – AM, SE, MT, RJ
- Astrothelium subendochryseum **B** – PA, MG
- Astrothelium subfuscum – AM, MG
- Astrothelium subinterjectum **B** – AC, MT, SP
- Astrothelium subscoria – AM, AP, TO, SE, BA, MT, MG, SP
- Astrothelium subvariolosum – PE
- Astrothelium sulphureum **B** – AM, PA
- Astrothelium supraclandestinum **B** – AM, RO, AP, MT
- Astrothelium suprainspersum **B** – AM
- Astrothelium tenue – SE
- Astrothelium testudineum **B** – AC, RO
- Astrothelium tetrasporum **B** – MG, ES, RJ, SP, RS
- Astrothelium thelotremoides – BA, MG
- Astrothelium trematum **B** – SP
- Astrothelium trypethelioides – AM
- Astrothelium tuberculosum – AC, AM, SE, BA, MT, SP
- Astrothelium unisporum **B** – AP, BA
- Astrothelium valsoides **B** – AM
- Astrothelium variolosum – AM, RO, RR, PA, PE, AL, SE, BA, MT, MS, MG, RJ, SP, RS
- Astrothelium versicolor – AM, RO, SE, MG, RS
- Astrothelium vulcanum – MT, MG
- Astrothelium xanthocavatum **B** – AM
- Astrothelium xanthopseudocyphellatum **B** – MS
- Astrothelium xanthosordithecium **B** – MG
- Astrothelium xanthosuperbum **B** – RO
- Astrothelium zebrinum – AM
- Aulaxina dictyospora **B** – PR
- Aulaxina intermedia – AM, RO, PB, PE, BA, MS, RJ, SP
- Aulaxina microphana – AM, RO, PA, PE, MS, SP, RS
- Aulaxina opegraphina – AM, PE, BA
- Aulaxina quadrangula **B** – AC, AM, RO, PA, PB, PE, AL, SE, BA, MT, MG, RJ, SP, PR, SC, RS
- Aulaxina submuralis **B** – PE, RJ, SP
- Aulaxinella corticola **B** – SP
- Aulaxinella minuta **B** – AM, RO, PA, PB, PE, BA, MT, MG, SP, PR
- Auriculora byssomorpha – AL, BA, MG, ES, RJ
- Austroparmelina conlabrosa – RS

== B ==
- Bacidia aggregatula **B** – MT
- Bacidia andita – RJ
- Bacidia arceutina – MA, BA, MT, MS, MG, ES, SP, SC, RS
- Bacidia asemanta **B** – MG
- Bacidia basalticola **B** – RS
- Bacidia brunneola **B** – RO, RS
- Bacidia campalea – MG, RJ, SP
- Bacidia carneolutea **B** – RS
- Bacidia chapadensis **B** – MT, MS, RS
- Bacidia chorisiae **B** – MS
- Bacidia cocoes **B** – RS
- Bacidia conferta **B** – MT
- Bacidia cuyabensis **B** – PB, MT, SP
- Bacidia deformis **B** – State unknown
- Bacidia fluminensis **B** – PE, BA
- Bacidia fraxinea – MG
- Bacidia fuliginea **B** – MT
- Bacidia fuscoviridis – MS, SP
- Bacidia hellbergii **B** – RS
- Bacidia heterochroa – AL, MS, MG, RJ, SP, SC, RS
- Bacidia horista – MT
- Bacidia hostheleoides – State unknown
- Bacidia hyalinella **B** – SP
- Bacidia igniarii – MS, RS
- Bacidia inamoena **B** – SP
- Bacidia laurocerasi – MS
- Bacidia lividofuscescens **B** – MG, RJ, SP
- Bacidia lutescens **B** – SP, RS
- Bacidia megapotamica **B** – CE, SP, RS
- Bacidia micraspis **B** – MG
- Bacidia millegrana – AM, PA, TO, MT, MS, MG, RJ, SP, SC, RS
- Bacidia multilocularis **B** – SP, RJ
- Bacidia mutabilis **B** – MT, SP
- Bacidia ochrocheila **B** – MG
- Bacidia paulensis **B** – SP
- Bacidia personata **B** – RS
- Bacidia phaeoloma **B** – SP
- Bacidia phaeomelana – State unknown
- Bacidia polychroa – MS, SP, RS
- Bacidia reagens **B** – RS
- Bacidia rebelliosa **B** – SP
- Bacidia rufella **B** – SP
- Bacidia rufinula **B** – RJ
- Bacidia rufocarnea **B** – MT
- Bacidia russeola **B** – PE, SE, BA, MT, MS, SP, SC, RS
- Bacidia schweinitzii – CE, MG, RS
- Bacidia segregata **B** – RS
- Bacidia serrana **B** – MT
- Bacidia sitiana **B** – MG
- Bacidia sororia **B** – MG, SP
- Bacidia spadicea – SP
- Bacidia spruceana **B** – AM
- Bacidia subinnata **B** – RS
- Bacidia subrudecta **B** – MG, SP
- Bacidia subtestacea **B** – MT, RJ, RS
- Bacidia termitophila **B** – RO, BA, MT, MS
- Bacidia testacea **B** – PE, SP, RS
- Bacidia tijucana **B** – RJ
- Bacidia vexans **B** – SP
- Bacidia xylophila **B** – RJ
- Bacidina adastra – MS
- Bacidina apiahica **B** – RO, PA, PB, PE, AL, SE, BA, MT, MS, ES, RJ, SP, PR, SC, RS
- Bacidina arnoldiana – SP
- Bacidina arvidssonii – AC, AL, MG, SC
- Bacidina defecta – PE, MT, MS, MG, SP
- Bacidina delicata – RO
- Bacidina digitalis – AL
- Bacidina hypophylla **B** – AM, PA
- Bacidina inundata – SP, RS
- Bacidina lacerata – AM, SC
- Bacidina medialis – RO, MA, CE, RN, PB, PE, AL, SE, MT, MS, MG, RJ, SP, RS
- Bacidina multiseptata **B** – PE
- Bacidina neosquamulosa – PA, AP, MA, SE
- Bacidina neotropica – AM, PA, AL, SE, BA, MT, MS, ES, PR
- Bacidina pallidocarnea **B** – PE, AL, RJ, SP, PR, SC, RS
- Bacidina phacodes – RO, MA, SE, BA, MG, RS
- Bacidina pseudohyphophorifera – AM, RO, PA, PE, MT, MS, SC
- Bacidina pseudoisidiatavan – AM, SE, SP
- Bacidina scutellifera – AM, PE, SP
- Bacidina squamellosa – MS
- Bacidina varia – PE, AL, RS
- Bacidiopsora microphyllina – AM, RO, SE, MG, RJ, SC, RS
- Bacidiopsora orizabana – SE
- Bacidiopsora psorina – MG
- Bacidiopsora silvicola **B** – AC, AM, RO, AP, AL, MT, SP, SC, RS
- Bacidiopsora squamulosula – RO, MG, RS
- Bacidiopsora tenuisecta **B** – MG
- Bactrospora angularis **B** – PE, SC
- Bactrospora denticulata – PE, AL, SE, BA
- Bactrospora intermedia – SE, ES
- Bactrospora jenikii – PI, CE, RN, PB, PE, SE, BA, SC, RS
- Bactrospora lamprospora – PE, AL, SE
- Bactrospora myriadea – RN, PE, SE, RJ, RS
- Baculifera cinereocincta – BA, MS, RS
- Baculifera entochlora **B** – CE, PE, AL, MG, RJ, SP, RS
- Baculifera epiviolascens **B** – PE, MG
- Baculifera imshaugiana – SE
- Baculifera intermedioides **B** – PB, BA, MT, MS, GO, SP, RS
- Baculifera longispora – SE
- Baculifera micromera – CE, PE, BA, MS, MG, RS
- Baculifera pseudomicromera **B** – PE, AL, SE, BA, GO, MG, SP
- Baculifera remensa – PE, SE, MG
- Baculifera tobleri – MG
- Baculifera xylophila **B** – AL, MT, MG, SP
- Badimia corticola **B** – BA, SP
- Badimia dimidiata **B** – AM, RO, PA, PE, MT, RJ
- Badimia leioplacella **B** – AM
- Badimia montoyana – PE, SP
- Badimia pallidula – AM, RO, PA, MT
- Badimia tuckermanii – AM, PA
- Badimia vezdana – RO, PA
- Baeomyces puiggarii **B** – SP
- Baeomyces rufus – RJ
- Bahianora poeltii **B** – BA
- Bapalmuia callichroa **B** – MG, RJ, SP, SC
- Bapalmuia confusa **B** – PE, AL, SE, BA, MS, DF, MG, RJ, SP, SC, RS
- Bapalmuia consanguinea **B** – PE, MG, RJ, SP
- Bapalmuia halleana – AL, BA, ES
- Bapalmuia juliae **B** – SP
- Bapalmuia lafayetteana **B** – AL, BA, MG, SP, RS
- Bapalmuia lineata – AM, RO, PA, MT
- Bapalmuia nigrescens **B** – AM, PA, PE, AL, BA, MG, RJ, SP
- Bapalmuia pallescens **B** – AM, PA
- Bapalmuia palmularis **B** – AM, PA, PE, BA, MT, RJ, SP, SC
- Bapalmuia verrucosa **B** – AM, PA
- Bathelium inspersomastoideum – MA
- Bathelium lineare – PB, MT
- Bathelium madreporiforme **B** – AC, AM, RO, PA, AP, TO, MA, CE, PB, PE, AL, SE, BA, MT, MS, GO, DF, SP
- Bathelium mastoideum – AM, MA, CE, PE, AL, MT, MS
- Bathelium mirabile – MT
- Bathelium pruinolucens **B** – MT, MS
- Bathelium pruinosum – MS
- Batistomyces hyalinus **B** – AM, RO, BA, MT, SP
- Bezerroplaca fusconitida – PE
- Bezerroplaca lucernifera – PE, SE, BA, RJ
- Bezerroplaca pachyparaphysata **B** – MT
- Biatora canoumbrina – AC, AM, PA, SC
- Biatora kalbii **B** – AC, RO, PE, AL, SE, MT, MS
- Biatorella brasiliensis – MT, SP, SC
- Bilimbia corcovadensis **B** – RJ, SP, SC, RS
- Bilimbia poliocheila **B** – MG, RJ
- Blastenia melanantha **B** – SP
- Bogoriella complexoluminata **B** – MS
- Bogoriella decipiens – MT, SP
- Bogoriella megaspora – AC, AM, RO, SE, MS
- Bogoriella modesta – PB, AL
- Bogoriella obovata – MT
- Bogoriella oleosa – AM, RO, PA, CE, PB, PE, SE, MT, MS
- Bogoriella pachytheca – MS, RS
- Bogoriella thelena – BA, MG, SP, RS
- Bogoriella xantholateralis **B** – SC
- Botryolepraria neotropica – AL, MS, SP, SC, RS
- Brasilicia brasiliensis **B** – AM, RO, PA, PE, AL, BA, MT, MG, RJ, SP, PR, SC, RS
- Brianaria lutulata – PE, AL
- Brianaria sylvicola – MG
- Brigantiaea leucoxantha – PE, AL, SE, BA, DF, MG, ES, RJ, SP, PR, SC, RS
- Bryostigma lapidicola – RO, MS, SC
- Buellia aeruginascens – MG, SP, SC
- Buellia aethalea – MA, AL, MT, MG, ES, RJ, SP, SC
- Buellia alboatrior – MT
- Buellia anatolodia – RJ
- Buellia anatolodioides **B** – MT, RS
- Buellia auriculata **B** – MG
- Buellia bahiana **B** – RN, PB, PE, AL, SE, BA, MT, MS, SP, SC, RS
- Buellia chapadensis **B** – MT
- Buellia concava – MG
- Buellia contiguella **B** – MT, RJ, RS
- Buellia curatellae **B** – TO, MA, PI, PE, AL, SE, BA, MT, MS, GO, DF, MG, SP
- Buellia dejungens – CE, BA, MG, RS
- Buellia demutans – PE, AL, SE, SC, RS
- Buellia deplanata **B** – RJ
- Buellia desertica – CE, PB, AL
- Buellia diploloma **B** – RJ
- Buellia diplotommoides **B** – RS
- Buellia dispersa – MG
- Buellia dissa – PB, RS
- Buellia epiphaeoides **B** – RJ
- Buellia flavovirens **B** – SP
- Buellia fraudans **B** – BA, GO, DF, RS
- Buellia fuscella **B** – SP
- Buellia glaucescens **B** – MT
- Buellia glomerulosa **B** – MT
- Buellia griseovirens – SE, MT, MS, SP, PR, SC, RS
- Buellia halonia – CE, PE, SE, BA, MS, MG, ES, SP, SC
- Buellia homocarpa **B** – SP
- Buellia hypomelaena **B** – MG, RJ, RS
- Buellia insulina **B** – SP
- Buellia jaraguensis **B** – RJ
- Buellia lactea – RS
- Buellia lichexanthonica **B** – MA, MG, ES
- Buellia mamillana – CE, PE, AL, SE, BA, MT, MS, MG, ES, RJ, SP, SC, RS
- Buellia mattogrossensis **B** – MT
- Buellia microscopica **B** – MG, SP
- Buellia minima **B** – MT
- Buellia mutata **B** – RS
- Buellia nortetrapla **B** – AL
- Buellia ocellata – SE, SC
- Buellia papillosa **B** – SP
- Buellia parachroa **B** – RJ
- Buellia parastata – PB, PE, SE
- Buellia paulensis **B** – SP
- Buellia pleiotera **B** – PB, AL, MT
- Buellia pruinocalcarea **B** – MS
- Buellia pruinohafellia – RN, SE, SP
- Buellia punctatula **B** – RS
- Buellia recepta **B** – RJ, SP
- Buellia recipienda **B** – MG, ES
- Buellia rhombispora **B** – AL, MG
- Buellia rimulosa **B** – SP
- Buellia rubroreagens **B** – MS, GO, SP
- Buellia sequax – CE, SE
- Buellia serotina **B** – MT
- Buellia stellulata – CE, MS, MG, SC, RS
- Buellia subareolata **B** – MS, RJ
- Buellia subdisciformis – SE, MT, MG, RJ, SC
- Buellia subisabellina **B** – RS
- Buellia subnexa – SE
- Buellia subtabacina **B** – AM, MA, PE, BA, MT, MS, MG, ES, SP, PR
- Buellia sulphurea **B** – MT, SC
- Buellia tabacina **B** – RS
- Buellia termitophila **B** – MT, RS
- Buellia termitum **B** – MG
- Buellia testacea **B** – RS
- Buellia tetrapla – SC, RS
- Buellia tombadorensis **B** – BA
- Buellia trachyspora – AL, SE, MG, ES
- Buellia umbrina **B** – MT
- Buellia violascens **B** – MG, SP
- Buellia xanthinula **B** – MA, PE, BA, MT, MS, MG, SP, SC, RS
- Buellia xantholepis **B** – SP
- Buellia yaucoensis – PB, AL
- Bulbothrix amazonensis – PA
- Bulbothrix apophysata – PA, BA, MT, GO, DF, SP, RS
- Bulbothrix bicornuta **B** – PA, MG, RJ
- Bulbothrix bulbillosa – RS
- Bulbothrix bulbochaeta – DF
- Bulbothrix caribensis – BA
- Bulbothrix cassa **B** – SP
- Bulbothrix cinerea **B** – BA, MG, SP
- Bulbothrix continua **B** – MA, PE, MT, SP
- Bulbothrix coronata – PA, MT, MS, GO, DF
- Bulbothrix fungicola **B** – AM, PA, MA, MT, MS, GO, DF, MG, SP, RS
- Bulbothrix goebelii – GO, MG
- Bulbothrix hypocraea – TO, PE, MT, DF, MG, SP, PR, RS
- Bulbothrix isidiza – PA, CE, PE, BA, MT, MS, DF, MG, RJ, SP, PR, RS
- Bulbothrix klementii – SP
- Bulbothrix laevigatula – PE, AL, BA, MT, ES, RJ, SP
- Bulbothrix laeviuscula – SE, RS
- Bulbothrix leprieurii – SE, BA, SP
- Bulbothrix linteolocarpa **B** – MT, DF, SP
- Bulbothrix lyngei **B** – AM, PA, AL, SE, SP
- Bulbothrix meizospora – PE, SP
- Bulbothrix oliveirae **B** – PA, AL, MT, SP
- Bulbothrix papyrina – MT, MG, SP
- Bulbothrix pigmentacea – MT
- Bulbothrix pseudocoronata – MA, MT, MS, SP
- Bulbothrix pseudofungicola **B** – PA, SP
- Bulbothrix regnelliana **B** – MA, MS, GO, MG, SP, RS
- Bulbothrix schiffneri **B** – PA, SP
- Bulbothrix scortella – MT, MG, SP, RS
- Bulbothrix semilunata **B** – MT, MS, MG, RS
- Bulbothrix sensibilis **B** – DF, SP
- Bulbothrix silicisrea – DF
- Bulbothrix sipmanii – MA
- Bulbothrix subcoronata – PA, MT, GO, MG, RJ, SP, PR, RS
- Bulbothrix subdissecta – MA, AL, SE, BA, MT, MS, GO, SP, SC
- Bulbothrix subklementii **B** – MS, MG
- Bulbothrix suffixa – PA, MS, DF, SP, PR, RS
- Bulbothrix tabacina – AC, PE, SE, MT, GO, DF, MG, ES, SP, RS
- Bulbothrix thomasiana **B** – BA, MT
- Bulbothrix ventricosa – PA, PE, SE, BA, MG, ES, SP, PR, SC, RS
- Bulbothrix viatica **B** – GO, MG, RJ, SP, RS
- Bulbothrix viridescens **B** – PA, MT, MS, MG
- Bullatina aspidota – AC, PE, SE, ES, SP
- Bunodophoron australe – SP, SC
- Bunodophoron melanocarpum – MG, RJ, SC
- Byssolecania deplanata **B** – AM, PA, RJ
- Byssolecania fumosonigricans **B** – AC, AM, RO, PE, MT, SP, PR, RS
- Byssolecania hymenocarpa **B** – AM, PA, PB, PE, SE, BA, MT, MG, RJ, SP
- Byssolecania variabilis – AC, PA, PE, RJ, SP
- Byssolecania vezdae **B** – RO, PE, RJ, SP
- Byssoloma absconditum – AM, PA, PE, RJ, SP
- Byssoloma amazonicum **B** – AC, AM, MT
- Byssoloma anomalum **B** – AM
- Byssoloma aurantiacum **B** – AM, PA, PE, BA, MT, MG, SP
- Byssoloma catarinense **B** – SC
- Byssoloma catillariosporum **B** – SE
- Byssoloma chlorinum – AM, RO, PA, CE, PE, AL, SE, BA, MT, MS, MG, SP, PR, SC, RS
- Byssoloma citricola – AM, RJ
- Byssoloma discordans – RO, PE, SE, MG, SP, PR
- Byssoloma fadenii – PE, BA, RJ, SP, PR, SC, RS
- Byssoloma farkasii – AM
- Byssoloma guttiferae **B** – AM, PA, MT
- Byssoloma humboldtianum **B** – AM, PA, MT
- Byssoloma hypophyllum **B** – AM, PA
- Byssoloma leucoblepharum – AC, AM, RO, PA, CE, PB, PE, AL, SE, BA, MT, MS, GO, MG, ES, RJ, SP, PR, SC, RS
- Byssoloma meadii – CE, PE
- Byssoloma minutissimum **B** – AM, PA, PE, AL, MT, RJ, SP
- Byssoloma multipunctatum – RO
- Byssoloma polychromum **B** – AM, PE, BA, MG, RJ, SP, PR
- Byssoloma rubrireagens – MT, GO
- Byssoloma sprucei **B** – AM, PA, PE
- Byssoloma subdiscordans – AM, RO, PA, CE, PB, PE, AL, SE, BA, MT, GO, DF, MG, RJ, SP, PR, SC, RS
- Byssoloma subpolychromum – PE, MS, SP
- Byssoloma syzygii – SP
- Byssoloma tricholomum – AM, PA, CE, PB, PE, SE, MT, MG, RJ, SP, SC, RS
- Byssoloma vanderystii – PE, AL
- Byssotrema mirabile **B** – RO

== C ==
- Calenia atlantica **B** – PE, AL
- Calenia bullatinoides – PE, BA
- Calenia depressa **B** – PE, MT, SP, RS
- Calenia dictyospora – AC, SE
- Calenia graphidea – PE, BA, MT
- Calenia pernambucensis **B** – PE
- Calenia phyllogena – AM, PA, PE, SP
- Calenia submuralis – SE
- Caleniella triseptata **B** – AM, PA, PE, SP
- Caleniopsis laevigata **B** – AM, RS
- Calicium glaucellum – SP
- Calicium hyperelloides – AL, BA, MT, MS, MG, ES, RJ, SP, PR, SC, RS
- Calicium lenticulare – MG, RJ, SP, SC, RS
- Calicium leucochlorum – SP
- Calicium lutescens **B** – SP
- Calicium salicinum – AC, MT, MS, GO, MG, SP, SC, RS
- Calicium tricolor – MG
- Calopadia bonitensis **B** – PE
- Calopadia chacoensis **B** – MT, MS, GO, MG, ES, RJ, SP
- Calopadia editiae – PA, TO, PE, SE, BA, MT, RS
- Calopadia erythrocephala – SP
- Calopadia foliicola **B** – PA, PB, PE, AL, SE, BA, MT, MS, GO, RJ, SP, SC, RS
- Calopadia fusca **B** – AM, RO, PB, PE, SE, BA, MT, MS, MG, ES, SP, PR, SC, RS
- Calopadia granulosa **B** – RO
- Calopadia isidiosa **B** – MT
- Calopadia lecanorella – MT, MG, RJ, SP
- Calopadia perpallida – AC, RO, PA, PE, MT, RJ, SP, SC, RS
- Calopadia phyllogena **B** – AM, RO, PE, MT, RJ, SP, PR, RS
- Calopadia psoromoides **B** – MT
- Calopadia puiggarii **B** – AC, RO, PA, PE, SE, BA, MT, MS, MG, RJ, SP, PR, SC, RS
- Calopadia saxicola **B** – MT, SC
- Calopadia subcoerulescens – AM, PE, AL, SE, BA, MT, MS, MG, SP, PR, SC, RS
- Calopadia subfusca – RO, SE, SP, SC
- Caloplaca aggesta – State unknown
- Caloplaca aphanotripta – PE
- Caloplaca araguana – CE
- Caloplaca arenaria – PE, MG, ES
- Caloplaca atroflava – MS
- Caloplaca austromaritima **B** – PR, SC, RS
- Caloplaca bassiae – RO, RN, PE, AL, SE, BA, MS, MG
- Caloplaca baueri – AM, BA, MS, RJ, SP
- Caloplaca blastidiomaritima **B** – PR, SC
- Caloplaca boergesenii – SE
- Caloplaca brasiliensis **B** – MS, SP
- Caloplaca brebissonii – SP
- Caloplaca brittonii – PE
- Caloplaca brouardii – AL, SC
- Caloplaca byrsonimae **B** – MT
- Caloplaca cerina – RJ
- Caloplaca chlorina – MS
- Caloplaca chrysophthalma – SE, SP
- Caloplaca cinereosquamosa **B** – MT
- Caloplaca cinnabarina – CE, PE, SE, BA, MT, MS, MG, RJ, SP, SC, RS
- Caloplaca cirrochroa – RJ
- Caloplaca citrina – MG
- Caloplaca conjungens – State unknown
- Caloplaca conversa – MT, MG
- Caloplaca coronata – MG
- Caloplaca crenularia – PE, SC, RS
- Caloplaca crenulatella – MG
- Caloplaca crocea **B** – MS, ES, RJ, SP, SC, RS
- Caloplaca crocina **B** – BA, MT, MS, SP, RS
- Caloplaca cupulifera – CE, PE, SE, MS
- Caloplaca cuyabensis **B** – MT
- Caloplaca decipioides – PE, MS
- Caloplaca diducenda **B** – RJ
- Caloplaca diplacia – CE, AL, SE, BA, MT, MS, RJ, SP, SC, RS
- Caloplaca dissimilis **B** – MT
- Caloplaca erythrantha – AL, BA, MT, MS, MG, ES, RJ, SP, PR, SC, RS
- Caloplaca erythrantoides **B** – RJ
- Caloplaca fernandeziana **B** – MT
- Caloplaca ferruginea – RS
- Caloplaca flavida **B** – MT
- Caloplaca flavorubescens – MS
- Caloplaca flavovirescens – MS, RJ
- Caloplaca floridana – RJ
- Caloplaca fulvella **B** – MT
- Caloplaca fuscospora **B** – BA
- Caloplaca granularis – PE, MT, MS, GO, MG, ES, SP, SC, RS
- Caloplaca holocarpa – MS, RS
- Caloplaca inconnexa – RJ
- Caloplaca isidiosa **B** – CE, PE, AL, BA, ES, RJ, SC
- Caloplaca lecanorocarpa **B** – CE, PE, SE, BA, MT, MS
- Caloplaca lecapustulata **B** – AM, CE, PE, MT
- Caloplaca leptozona – CE, PE, SE, MT
- Caloplaca malmeana **B** – MG
- Caloplaca marginireflectans **B** – ES
- Caloplaca melanocheila **B** – MT
- Caloplaca microphyllina – RS
- Caloplaca obscurella – CE
- Caloplaca oxfordensis – MA
- Caloplaca peragrata – RJ
- Caloplaca puiggarii **B** – SP, RS
- Caloplaca pyracea – RS
- Caloplaca quadrilocularis – MG, SP
- Caloplaca scabrida – RS
- Caloplaca serenior **B** – RJ
- Caloplaca simulans **B** – SC
- Caloplaca stenospora **B** – MT
- Caloplaca subaurantiaca – RJ, SP, RS
- Caloplaca subrubelliana **B** – MG
- Caloplaca subsoluta – CE, PE, SE, MT, MS, MG, ES, RJ, SP, RS
- Caloplaca subvitellina **B** – SE, MT, MS, SC, RS
- Caloplaca wrightii – RO, SE, RS
- Caloplaca xanthobola **B** – MG, RJ, RS
- Calotrichopsis granulosa **B** – MT
- Calotrichopsis insignis **B** – MG
- Calvitimela aglaea – BA, RJ
- Candelaria concolor – CE, PE, BA, MT, MS, GO, MG, ES, SP, PR, SC, RS
- Candelaria fibrosa – MT, MS, MG, RS
- Candelaria pacifica – RJ, SP
- Candelariella efflorescens – MG, SP
- Candelariella reflexa – MG, ES, RJ
- Candelariella rosulans – PE
- Candelariella vitellina – RJ
- Canoparmelia albomaculata **B** – MG
- Canoparmelia caroliniana – AM, PE, AL, BA, MT, MS, GO, DF, MG, ES, RJ, SP, PR, SC, RS
- Canoparmelia consanguinea **B** – PE, RS
- Canoparmelia cryptochlorophaea – MA, CE, PE, AL, SE, BA, MT, MS, MG, RJ, SP, PR, SC, RS
- Canoparmelia ecaperata – BA, MS, ES, SP
- Canoparmelia martinicana – MA, SE, BA, MS
- Canoparmelia nashii **B** – SP
- Canoparmelia pseudoecaperata **B** – MS, SP
- Canoparmelia pustulifera **B** – RJ, SP, RS
- Canoparmelia roseoreagens **B** – RS
- Canoparmelia rupicola **B** – PR, SC, RS
- Canoparmelia sanguinea **B** – SP, RS
- Canoparmelia subroseoreagens **B** – RS
- Canoparmelia texana – MA, CE, PE, SE, BA, MT, MS, GO, DF, MG, ES, RJ, SP, PR, SC, RS
- Caprettia amazonensis **B** – AM, RO, PA, PE, ES, PR
- Caprettia lichexanthotricha **B** – RO, AL, PR
- Caprettia neotropica – AL
- Carassea connexa **B** – BA, MG, RJ
- Carbacanthographis brasiliensis **B** – MG, SP
- Carbacanthographis candidata **B** – AM, RO, PA, TO, CE, MA, PB, AL, SE, BA, MT, SP, PR
- Carbacanthographis chionophora **B** – AM, RO, PA, TO, MA, RN, PB, SE, BA, MT, ES
- Carbacanthographis chionophoroides – SE, SP
- Carbacanthographis clandestinospora **B** – PA
- Carbacanthographis coccospora **B** – MG
- Carbacanthographis crassa **B** – PE, SE, BA, MG, RJ, SP, PR
- Carbacanthographis cristata **B** – MT
- Carbacanthographis inspersa **B** – AM, SP
- Carbacanthographis inspersomarcescens **B** – AP
- Carbacanthographis latispora – AM
- Carbacanthographis marcescens – AM, RO, PA, AP, RN, PB, PE, AL, SE, BA, MT, MG, RJ, SP, PR
- Carbacanthographis megalospora **B** – MG, ES
- Carbacanthographis nematoides – RS
- Carbacanthographis nitida **B** – RO
- Carbacanthographis spongiosa **B** – SE
- Carbacanthographis stictica **B** – AC, AM, RO, PA, AP, TO, MA, SE, BA, MT
- Carbacanthographis subalbotecta **B** – AC, RO, PA, AP, PB, BA, MT
- Carbacanthographis subchionophora – AM, SE
- Carbacanthographis violaceospora – PB
- Carbonea montevidensis – RS
- Catillaria amaurosa **B** – AM (provisionally accepted)
- Catillaria ammophila **B** – MG (provisionally accepted)
- Catillaria carassensis **B** – MG (provisionally accepted)
- Catillaria cereicola **B** – SP (provisionally accepted)
- Catillaria chalybaeoides **B** – RS (provisionally accepted)
- Catillaria chalybeia – PE, RS
- Catillaria constrictula **B** – AM (provisionally accepted)
- Catillaria depauperata **B** – MT, SP (provisionally accepted)
- Catillaria efflorescens **B** – MT (provisionally accepted)
- Catillaria irrorata **B** – MT (provisionally accepted)
- Catillaria isidiata **B** – MT (provisionally accepted)
- Catillaria itacolumitica **B** – MT (provisionally accepted)
- Catillaria leptoplaca **B** – MG (provisionally accepted)
- Catillaria macrozona – RJ, SP (provisionally accepted)
- Catillaria melanobotrys **B** – MG, SP (provisionally accepted)
- Catillaria picila – MG
- Catillaria subviridis – ES
- Catillaria testaceorufescens **B** – MG (provisionally accepted)
- Catillaria tristissima **B** – MG (provisionally accepted)
- Catillochroma anaglypticum **B** – MG, SP, SC
- Catillochroma endochromum – BA, MT, MG, RJ, SP, SC, RS
- Catillochroma flavosorediatum **B** – MG, SC
- Catillochroma intermiscens – RJ, SP
- Catillochroma leptocheilum – BA, MG, SP, RS
- Catinaria atropurpurea – MT, MS, RS
- Catinaria microcarpa – SP
- Celothelium aciculiferum – PE, MG
- Celothelium burchellii – State unknown
- Celothelium cinchonarum – SE, BA, MG
- Celothelium dominicanum – RO, CE, BA, MG
- Chaenotheca brunneola – MT, MG, RJ, SP
- Chaenotheca chlorella – MG, RJ, SP, SC
- Chaenotheca confusa **B** – SP
- Chaenotheca furfuracea – SP, SC
- Chaenotheca olivaceorufa **B** – MG, SP, SC
- Chaenothecopsis kalbii **B** – BA, MS
- Chaenothecopsis pilosa – AM, MT, MG
- Chaenothecopsis pusilla – SP
- Chaenothecopsis rubina – SP
- Chapsa albida – AP, SP
- Chapsa alborosella – AC, AM, AP, RN, PB, AL, SE, BA, MT, ES, RJ, SP
- Chapsa amazonica **B** – AM
- Chapsa angustispora **B** – PB
- Chapsa chionostoma – AM, PB, PE, SE, SP, RS
- Chapsa cinchonarum – BA, SP, RS
- Chapsa constrictospora **B** – BA
- Chapsa defecta – AP
- Chapsa defectosorediata – AC, AM, RO, PE, SE, BA
- Chapsa diorygmoides **B** – AP
- Chapsa diploschistoides – SE, BA
- Chapsa discoides – AC, RO, AP, CE, PB, PE, AL, SE, MT, MS, GO, DF, ES, SC
- Chapsa dissuta – AM, PA, AP, AL
- Chapsa eitenii – MG
- Chapsa elabens **B** – SE, BA
- Chapsa farinosa – SE
- Chapsa flavens – CE
- Chapsa granulifera **B** – AM
- Chapsa indica – PE, AL, BA, MT
- Chapsa inspersa **B** – PE
- Chapsa leprocarpa – AM, RO, PA, TO, PB, PE, SE, BA, MT, MS, MG, ES, SP, SC
- Chapsa leprocarpoides – PE, AL, SE
- Chapsa lichexanthonica **B** – AP
- Chapsa microspora **B** – AM
- Chapsa neei – BA, MT
- Chapsa pallidella **B** – RJ
- Chapsa patens – PB, AL, SE, BA
- Chapsa perdissuta – GO
- Chapsa phlyctidioides – AM, MT
- Chapsa rivas-platae – AP, SP
- Chapsa scabiomarginata – BA
- Chapsa sorediata **B** – AP, SP
- Chapsa sublilacina – AC, AP, PB, PE, SE, BA
- Chapsa subpatens – PB
- Chapsa thallotrema – AC, AM, RO, PA, AP, CE, SE, BA, MS, ES, SP, RS
- Chiodecton complexum **B** – AM, RO, AP, CE, SE, BA, MT, SC
- Chiodecton graphidastroides **B** – RJ
- Chiodecton lichexanthonicum **B** – AM, MS
- Chiodecton malmei **B** – AM, CE, PB, AL, SE, BA, MT, MG, SP, SC, RS
- Chiodecton panduriforme **B** – AM (provisionally accepted)
- Chiodecton sphaerale – AC, AM, CE, SE, BA, MT, MG, ES, RJ, SP, SC, RS
- Chiodecton xanthonosorediatum **B** – MS
- Chrismofulvea rubifaciens – SP
- Chroodiscus argillaceus – PA
- Chroodiscus australiensis – AM, PB, PE, SP
- Chroodiscus coccineus **B** – AC, AM, RO, PA, PE, AL, SE, BA, MT, MS, MG, RJ, SP, PR, SC, RS
- Chroodiscus graphideus **B** – AM, PA
- Chroodiscus neotropicus **B** – RO, PA, PB, PE, MG, SP
- Chrysothrix candelaris – SE, MS, DF, MG, ES, SP, SC, RS
- Chrysothrix chlorina – AL, SE, BA, MT, RJ, SP, SC
- Chrysothrix citrinella **B** – MA, BA, MT, MS, RJ
- Chrysothrix granulosa – MS
- Chrysothrix occidentalis – RO, MS
- Chrysothrix placodioides **B** – BA, MT, MG
- Chrysothrix xanthina – AC, AM, RO, AP, TO, MA, CE, PB, PE, AL, SE, BA, MT, MS, GO, MG, ES, SP, PR, RS
- Cladia aggregata – PE, AL, SE, BA, GO, MG, ES, RJ, SP, PR, SC, RS
- Cladonia acuminata – MG, RJ
- Cladonia ahtii **B** – BA, MG, SP, SC, RS
- Cladonia albofuscescens **B** – MG, RJ, PR
- Cladonia anaemica **B** – AL, MG, SP
- Cladonia andesita – MG, RJ, RS
- Cladonia arcuata – AM, BA, MG, RJ, RS
- Cladonia bahiana **B** – SE, BA, MG
- Cladonia brasiliensis **B** – AM, PA, BA
- Cladonia caespiticia – RS
- Cladonia calycanthoides **B** – MG, ES, PR, RS
- Cladonia carassensis **B** – MG
- Cladonia cariosa – SC
- Cladonia cartilaginea – AM, PB, PE, MS, MG, ES, RJ, SP, PR, RS
- Cladonia ceratophylla – PA, MA, PE, AL, BA, MT, MG, ES, RJ, SP, PR, SC, RS
- Cladonia chlorophaea – RJ, SP, PR, RS
- Cladonia chondrotypa **B** – MG, RJ, SP, PR, SC, RS
- Cladonia clathrata **B** – PB, PE, SE, BA, MG, ES, SP, PR
- Cladonia coccifera – BA, MG, ES, RJ, SP, RS
- Cladonia confusa – AM, RR, AL, SE, BA, MG, ES, RJ, SP, PR, SC, RS
- Cladonia consimilis **B** – MG, ES, SP, PR
- Cladonia corallifera – AM, RO, RR, PA, BA, MS, MG, ES
- Cladonia corniculata – SE, MG, RJ, SP, SC, RS
- Cladonia crassiuscula **B** – PA
- Cladonia crispatula – SE, BA, MG, ES, RJ, SP, PR, SC, RS
- Cladonia crustacea **B** – BA, MG, ES, RJ, SP
- Cladonia curta **B** – DF, SP
- Cladonia dactylota **B** – MG, RJ, SC, RS
- Cladonia dendroides **B** – PB, PE, BA, ES, RJ, PR, SC
- Cladonia densissima – AM, RR
- Cladonia didyma – AM, RO, RR, PA, RN, PE, AL, SE, BA, DF, MG, ES, RJ, SP, PR, SC, RS
- Cladonia dimorpha – MG
- Cladonia dimorphoclada – SC
- Cladonia dissecta **B** – BA
- Cladonia divaricata **B** – BA, MG, PR
- Cladonia dunensis **B** – SC
- Cladonia farinophylla **B** – MG, ES, RJ, SP, RS
- Cladonia fissidens **B** – MG, ES, RJ, PR, RS
- Cladonia flagellaris **B** – PB, MG, ES, RJ, SP, SC
- Cladonia fleigiae **B** – MG
- Cladonia friabilis **B** – BA, MG, RJ
- Cladonia furfuracea **B** – PB, PE, SE, BA, MT, MS, ES, RJ, SP, PR, SC, RS
- Cladonia furfuraceoides – AM, RR, MG
- Cladonia grayi – MG, RJ, SP, PR, SC, RS
- Cladonia guianensis – RR
- Cladonia gumboskii **B** – SE, BA, MT, MS, MG, RJ, SP, PR, SC, RS
- Cladonia humilis – BA, MG, ES
- Cladonia hypomelaena **B** – MG
- Cladonia hypoxanthoides **B** – PA, MT, MG
- Cladonia ibitipocae **B** – MG
- Cladonia imperialis **B** – MG, RJ, SP, PR
- Cladonia inflata **B** – BA
- Cladonia itatiaiae **B** – MG, RJ
- Cladonia kalbii **B** – AL, SE, BA, MG, ES, RJ, PR
- Cladonia kriegeri **B** – MG
- Cladonia latiloba **B** – RJ, SP, PR, SC, RS
- Cladonia lichexanthonica **B** – SE, BA, MG, RJ, PR
- Cladonia litoralis **B** – SC
- Cladonia lopezii – MG
- Cladonia macilenta – BA, MT, MS, MG, ES, RJ, SP, PR, SC, RS
- Cladonia macilentoides **B** – MG, RJ, SP, RS
- Cladonia maculata **B** – SC
- Cladonia marcellii **B** – GO, MG
- Cladonia megafurcata **B** – PE, BA, DF, MG, RJ, SP, SC, RS
- Cladonia megaphylla **B** – SE, DF, MG, SP, PR
- Cladonia meridionalis **B** – SP, PR
- Cladonia merochlorophaea – PR, SC, RS
- Cladonia metaminiata **B** – BA, MG
- Cladonia minarum **B** – MG, RJ
- Cladonia miniata – RR, SE, BA, MG, ES, RJ, SP, PR, SC, RS
- Cladonia minisaxicola **B** – BA
- Cladonia mollis – AM, PA
- Cladonia multiformis – PR, SC
- Cladonia mutabilis **B** – MG, RJ
- Cladonia nana **B** – AM, RR, PA, BA, MG, ES, RJ, SP, SC, RS
- Cladonia novochlorophaea – MG
- Cladonia obscurata **B** – BA, MG
- Cladonia obtecta **B** – MG
- Cladonia ochracea **B** – SE, MS, MG, ES, RJ, SP, PR, SC, RS
- Cladonia ochrochlora – BA, DF, MG, RJ, SP, PR, SC, RS
- Cladonia palmicola **B** – RS, SC
- Cladonia paranaensis **B** – PR
- Cladonia parvipes **B** – SE, BA, MG, ES, SC
- Cladonia peltastica **B** – AM, RO, RR, PA, AP, MG
- Cladonia penicillata **B** – BA, GO, MG, ES, RJ, SP, PR, RS
- Cladonia perfilata – MG, RJ
- Cladonia perfoliata **B** – BA, MG, RJ
- Cladonia peziziformis – PE, RJ, SP, SC, RS
- Cladonia piedadensis **B** – MG
- Cladonia pityrophylla **B** – RR, PA, CE, PB, PE, AL, SE, BA, MT, DF, MG, ES, RJ, SP, PR, SC, RS
- Cladonia pleurota – MG, SC
- Cladonia polyscypha **B** – AM, RO, CE, PB, PE, AL, SE, BA, ES, RJ, SP, PR, SC
- Cladonia polystomata **B** – AM, SE, MG, ES, RJ, SP, PR, SC
- Cladonia polytypa **B** – MG
- Cladonia prancei **B** – AM, RO, PA, MT, DF
- Cladonia pumila **B** – MG, PR
- Cladonia pyxidata – BA, MG, ES, RJ, PR, SC, RS
- Cladonia quiririensis **B** – PR, SC
- Cladonia ramulosa – AM, RR, PA, PE, DF, MG, RJ, SP, PR, SC, RS
- Cladonia rappii – MG, ES, RJ, SP, PR, SC, RS
- Cladonia rhodoleuca **B** – PB, PE, BA, MG
- Cladonia robbinsii – AL, RS
- Cladonia rotundata – AM
- Cladonia rugicaulis **B** – CE, PB, AL, SE, MG, ES
- Cladonia salmonea **B** – BA, MG, RJ, RS
- Cladonia salzmannii **B** – PB, PE, SE, BA, ES
- Cladonia secundana **B** – AM, RR, PA, PB, PE, BA, MG, ES, RJ, SC
- Cladonia signata **B** – AM, PA, BA, MT, MG, ES, RJ, SP, PR, SC
- Cladonia solida **B** – MG, RJ, SP, PR, SC, RS
- Cladonia sphacelata **B** – PB, PE, SE, MG, ES, RJ, SP, PR, SC
- Cladonia spinea **B** – RR, PA, ES
- Cladonia sprucei **B** – AM, RR, PA, TO, MG, ES
- Cladonia squamosa – PA, RJ, SP, PR, SC
- Cladonia stenroosiae **B** – MG, ES
- Cladonia sticticocrustosa **B** – RJ
- Cladonia strepsilis – BA, MG, SP, PR, RS
- Cladonia subcariosa – MG, PR, SC, RS
- Cladonia subdelicatula **B** – AM, AL, SE, MG, RJ, SP, PR, SC, RS
- Cladonia subminiata **B** – PB, PE, SE, ES
- Cladonia subradiata **B** – AC, AM, RO, RR, PA, MA, PB, PE, AL, SE, BA, MT, MS, DF, MG, ES, RJ, SP, PR, SC, RS
- Cladonia subreticulata **B** – BA, MG, SP
- Cladonia subsquamosa **B** – PB, PE, SE, BA, GO, MG, ES, RJ, SP, PR, SC, RS
- Cladonia substellata **B** – PB, PE, SE, BA, MG, ES, RJ, SC
- Cladonia symphycarpa – RS
- Cladonia testaceopallens **B** – DF, MG, RJ, SP, PR
- Cladonia turgidior **B** – BA, MG, ES, RJ, SC
- Cladonia verticillaris **B** – PB, PE, BA, GO, MG, ES, RJ, PR, SC
- Cladonia xanthozebrina **B** – SP
- Cladonia zebrathallina **B** – MS
- Clandestinotrema caloplacosporum **B** – BA
- Clandestinotrema clandestinum – PA, SP
- Clandestinotrema erumpens – State unknown
- Clandestinotrema leucomelaenum – AM, MG
- Clandestinotrema minutum – MS
- Clandestinotrema pauperius – SE
- Clandestinotrema stylothecium **B** – SP
- Clavascidium antillarum – PE, SP
- Cliostomum griffithii – SP
- Cliostomum subplebejum **B** – MG
- Cliostomum variicolor **B** – RO, RS
- Coccocarpia adnata – MT
- Coccocarpia dissecta – SE, MS
- Coccocarpia domingensis – PA, PE, BA, DF, MG, ES, SP, PR, RS
- Coccocarpia epiphylla – AM, PA, SE, BA, MS, MG, RJ, SP, PR
- Coccocarpia erythrocardia **B** – AM, DF
- Coccocarpia erythroxyli – AC, AM, RO, PA, AP, MA, PE, SE, BA, MT, MS, DF, MG, ES, RJ, SP, PR, SC, RS
- Coccocarpia filiformis – AM, PA, AL, BA, MS, ES, SP, SC
- Coccocarpia imbricascens – RO, PA, DF
- Coccocarpia microphyllina – AL, SE, MS, PR
- Coccocarpia neglecta – CE
- Coccocarpia palmicola – AM, PA, AP, MA, PE, AL, SE, BA, MT, MS, MG, ES, RJ, SP, PR, SC, RS
- Coccocarpia pellita – AM, RO, PA, AP, PE, AL, BA, MT, MS, MG, ES, RJ, SP, PR, SC, RS
- Coccocarpia prostrata – AM, RO, AP, CE, AL, BA, MS, MG, SP, PR, SC, RS
- Coccocarpia stellata – AM, PA, PE, MT, DF, MG, RJ, SP, RS
- Coccocarpia tenuissima – AM, AP, ES
- Coenogonium acrocephalum **B** – SP
- Coenogonium atroluteum **B** – RJ, SP, RS
- Coenogonium bacilliferum **B** – RS
- Coenogonium barbatellum – AM, SE
- Coenogonium barbatum – AC, AM, RO, CE, AL, BA, MT, MS, SP, PR
- Coenogonium carassense **B** – MG
- Coenogonium chloroticum **B** – AM, AP, MA, CE, PB, AL, SE, MS, SP
- Coenogonium ciliatum **B** – AM, RO, PA, PE, MT
- Coenogonium confervoides – AC, AM, PA, AP, PE, AL, BA, MT, ES, SP
- Coenogonium congense – PR
- Coenogonium coppinsii **B** – AM, RO, AP, SE, BA, MS
- Coenogonium curvulum – PE
- Coenogonium deplanatum – RJ
- Coenogonium dilucidum – RO, PE, AL, BA, MT, MS, RJ, SP, SC, RS
- Coenogonium disjunctum – PE, SE, SC, RS
- Coenogonium fallaciosum **B** – AM, PA, MT, MS, SP
- Coenogonium flavoviride **B** – RO, PE, BA
- Coenogonium flavum – PE, MT
- Coenogonium geralense **B** – AM, PA, CE, PB, PE, AL, SE, BA, MS, ES, SP, SC, RS
- Coenogonium hypophyllum – AM, RO, PA, PE, AL, BA, MT, SP, SC
- Coenogonium implexum – SP, SC, RS
- Coenogonium interplexum – AC, AM, PA, PB, PE, AL, SE, SP, RS
- Coenogonium interpositum – AM, RO, PA, MT, PR, RS
- Coenogonium isidiatum – SE
- Coenogonium isidiiferum – SP
- Coenogonium isidiigerum – RS
- Coenogonium isidiosum – AC, PB, PE, AL, SE, MS
- Coenogonium itabaianense **B** – SE
- Coenogonium linkii **B** – AC, AM, RO, PA, AP, MA, PB, PE, AL, SE, BA, MT, MG, RJ, SP, PR, SC, RS
- Coenogonium luteocitrinum – CE, PB, PE, AL, SE
- Coenogonium luteum – PE, SE, BA, MT, MS, MG, RJ, SC, RS
- Coenogonium magdalenae – MG, SP
- Coenogonium minidenticulatum **B** – AP
- Coenogonium moniliforme – CE, PE, AL, SE, BA, MT, MS
- Coenogonium nepalense – RO, MA, CE, PB, PE, AL, BA, RS
- Coenogonium pannosum **B** – SP
- Coenogonium persistens **B** – MT
- Coenogonium pilosum **B** – BA
- Coenogonium pineti – PE, AL, RJ, RS
- Coenogonium pulchrum **B** – SP
- Coenogonium pusillum – MS, SP
- Coenogonium pyrophthalmum – PE, SE, BA, MT, MS, SP, RS
- Coenogonium riparium – MG, RJ
- Coenogonium roumeguerianum – MT, MS
- Coenogonium saepincola – PB
- Coenogonium stenosporum **B** – RS
- Coenogonium strigosum – AM, PA, AP, PE, AL, SE, BA, MT, MS, ES, SP, PR, RS
- Coenogonium subdentatum – AM, PA, CE, PB, PE, AL, SE, BA, MT, MS, ES, PR, SC, RS
- Coenogonium subdilutum **B** – RO, AP, TO, CE, PE, AL, SE, BA, MT, MS, SP, RS
- Coenogonium subfallaciosum – PB, PE
- Coenogonium subimplexum **B** – MG
- Coenogonium subluteum – AC, AM, RO, PA, PB, PE, AL, SE, BA, MT, MS, MG, ES, RJ, SP, PR, SC, RS
- Coenogonium subzonatum – AC, CE, PB, PE, AL, BA, MT, MS, SP
- Coenogonium upretianum **B** – MT, MS, SC, RS
- Coenogonium vezdanum – PE
- Coenogonium zonatum – RO, AP, PE, AL, BA, MS, RS
- Collema furfuraceum – MT, MS, MG, SC
- Collema glaucophthalmum – PE, MT, MS, MG, SP, RS
- Collema leptaleum – SE, MT, MS, MG, RJ, SP
- Collema nigrescens – MG, SC
- Collema oblique-peltatum **B** – AM
- Collema pulcellum – PA, BA
- Collema pustulatum – MT, MS
- Collema redundans – SP, RS
- Collema rugosum – TO
- Collema texanum – MA, CE, SE, MS
- Collema venustum **B** – State unknown (provisionally accepted)
- Collemopsidium argilospilum – PE
- Collemopsidium atlanticum – MS
- Collemopsidium ceuthocarpoides **B** – SP
- Collemopsidium crassostreicola **B** – BA, SC
- Collemopsidium sublitorale – SP
- Collemopsidium zonatum **B** – SP
- Coniarthonia aurata **B** – PE, MS
- Coniarthonia echinospora **B** – MT
- Coniarthonia gregarina – MS
- Coniarthonia haematodea **B** – BA
- Coniarthonia megaspora **B** – AM, SE, BA
- Coniarthonia micromuralis **B** – AM
- Coniarthonia pulcherrima – AM, RO, PA, CE
- Coniarthonia pyrrhula – MG, SP
- Coniarthonia rosea **B** – AM, RO, AP
- Coniarthonia wilmsiana – BA, SP
- Coniocarpon cinnabarinum – AC, RO, PA, MA, CE, PE, AL, SE, BA, MT, MS, MG, ES, RJ, SP, PR, SC, RS
- Coniocarpon foliicola **B** – MT
- Coniocarpon piccolioides **B** – BA
- Coniocarpon rubrocinctum – AM, RO, BA
- Constrictolumina cinchonae – CE, RN, PB, PE, AL, SE, BA, MT, MS, GO, DF, MG, ES, RJ, SP, PR, RS
- Constrictolumina esenbeckiana – SE
- Constrictolumina fusca **B** – MS
- Constrictolumina planorbis – PE, SE, MT, MS, SP, SC
- Constrictolumina porospora – SE
- Cora campestris **B** – ES, PR
- Cora caraana **B** – RS
- Cora hawksworthiana – MG
- Cora itabaiana **B** – AL, SE
- Cora pavonia – AM, PA, PE, MG, ES, RJ, SP, PR, SC, RS
- Cora reticulifera **B** – MG, ES, SC
- Cora soredavidia **B** – MG
- Cora trindadensis **B** – ES
- Corella brasiliensis **B** – AM, BA, MG, SP, PR
- Corella zahlbruckneri **B** – SP
- Corticorygma stellatum **B** – AC, RO, MT, PR
- Cratiria aggrediens – BA, MG, RJ, SP, SC
- Cratiria americana **B** – CE, AL, MT, MS, MG, RJ, SP, RS
- Cratiria amphorea – PE, AL, SP, RS
- Cratiria chloraceus – ES
- Cratiria lauricassiae – AM, PE, SE, BA, MT, MS, RJ, SP, PR, RS
- Cratiria megaobscurior – SE, ES
- Cratiria melanochlora **B** – MS, RJ, SP, SC, RS
- Cratiria obscurior – MA, CE, PB, PE, AL, SE, BA, MT, MS, GO, MG, ES, RJ, SP, SC, RS
- Cratiria rutilans **B** – MG, RJ, SP
- Cratiria saltensis – MS, RS
- Cratiria vioxanthina – MA, AL, SE, MT, MS, ES, SP, SC
- Crespoa carneopruinata **B** – CE, PE, BA, MT, MS, DF, MG, ES, RJ, SP, PR, RS
- Crespoa crozalsiana – MA, AL, SE, BA, MT, MS, GO, DF, MG, ES, SP, PR, RS
- Crespoa roystoneae **B** – PE
- Crespoa scrobicularis **B** – CE, MS, MG, ES, SP, PR, RS
- Cresponea endosulphurea **B** – CE
- Cresponea flava – RN, MT, MS
- Cresponea flavosorediata **B** – AM, RO, MT
- Cresponea leprieurii – CE, PE, MT, MS, MG, RJ, SP, RS
- Cresponea lichenicola **B** – RO, SE
- Cresponea melanocheiloides – AC, RN, AL, BA, SC, RS
- Cresponea plurilocularis – MT, MS
- Cresponea proximata – TO, RN, SE, MT, MS, GO, RS
- Cresponea quinqueseptata **B** – SE
- Crocodia aurata – AM, PE, AL, BA, MG, ES, RJ, SP, PR, SC, RS
- Crocodia aurora – PA, RJ, SP, SC, RS
- Crocodia clathrata – BA, MS, MG, ES, RJ, SP, PR, SC, RS
- Crocynia sanguinolenta **B** – RS (provisionally accepted)
- Cruentotrema amazonum **B** – AM, RO, AP
- Cruentotrema cruentatum – PB, PE, AL, SE
- Crustospathula amazonica **B** – AC, AM, RO, AL
- Crustospathula humboldtii – AM, MT
- Crypthonia albida – AC, AM, PA, AP, PE, AL, SE, BA, MT, MS, DF, ES, RJ, PR
- Crypthonia brevispora – MT, RS
- Crypthonia corticorygmoides **B** – AM, PA, AP
- Crypthonia irregularis **B** – SE
- Crypthonia lichexanthonica **B** – CE
- Crypthonia mycelioides – MT
- Crypthonia olivacea – AP, SP
- Crypthonia pseudisidiata **B** – RO, SE
- Crypthonia pustulata **B** – AM, PA
- Crypthonia stromatica **B** – PA, SE
- Crypthonia submuriformis **B** – CE, SE, MT, MS
- Cryptodiscus similis **B** – SP
- Cryptophaea constrictopseudisidiata **B** – BA
- Cryptophaea lichexanthopseudisidiata **B** – RO, BA, SC
- Cryptophaea lichexanthosorediata – BA
- Cryptoschizotrema cryptotrema – AC, AM, RN, PB, AL, BA, MT, MG, RJ
- Cryptoschizotrema minus **B** – AP, PB, AL
- Cryptothecia albomaculata – SE
- Cryptothecia aleurocarpa – AC, AM, MT, MG
- Cryptothecia demethylconfluentica **B** – SE
- Cryptothecia duplofluorescens **B** – PR
- Cryptothecia effusa – AM, PE, AL, MT, MS, ES, RJ, PR
- Cryptothecia fabispora **B** – AC, AM, RO, PA, TO, PE, SE, BA, MT, SP
- Cryptothecia faveolata – MS
- Cryptothecia inexspectata – AM, MT, SP, PR
- Cryptothecia isidioxantha **B** – MA, PE, MT, MS, SP
- Cryptothecia lecanorosorediata **B** – RO, AP, SE
- Cryptothecia lichexanthonica **B** – AC, AM, RO, AP, TO, PE, SE, BA, MT, ES, SP, SC
- Cryptothecia macrocephala **B** – AM, CE, PE, SE, MT
- Cryptothecia malmei **B** – MT, MS, GO, MG
- Cryptothecia methylperlatolica **B** – RO
- Cryptothecia paramacrocephala **B** – BA
- Cryptothecia parvopsoromica **B** – MT
- Cryptothecia punctosorediata – RO, AP, PE, AL, SE, BA, MS
- Cryptothecia reagens **B** – RO
- Cryptothecia rhizophora **B** – AP, MT, MS
- Cryptothecia striata – AM, RO, PA, AP, TO, RN, PE, AL, SE, BA, MT, MS, MG, ES, SC, RS
- Cyphellostereum nitidum – PE
- Cyphellostereum phyllogenum – AM, RJ, SC
- Cyphellostereum pusiolum **B** – MG, ES, RJ, PR, SC
- Cystocoleus ebeneus – MG

== D ==
- Dendrographa austrosorediata **B** – PE, BA, MT, MS, MG, SP, SC
- Dermatocarpon australe **B** – MS
- Dermatocarpon carassense **B** – MG
- Dibaeis absoluta – MT, MG, RJ, SP, SC, RS
- Dibaeis fungoides – MG, SP
- Dibaeis globulifera **B** – MG, RJ, SP
- Dibaeis sorediata – AL, MG, ES, SP, SC, RS
- Dichoporis bermudana – MS
- Dichoporis phaea – AC, AM, AP, CE, PB, PE, AL, SE, BA, MT, MS, SP
- Dichoporis taylorii – MS
- Dichoporis tenuis – RO, SE
- Dichoporis viridiseda – PE
- Dichoporis wilsonii – MT
- Dichoporis ziziphi – AL, SE
- Dichosporidium fibrosum **B** – SP
- Dichosporidium lanosum **B** – SP
- Dichosporidium nigrocinctum – AC, AM, PE, AL, SE, BA, MT, GO, MG, RJ, SP, RS
- Dichosporidium sorediatum – AM, AP, BA
- Dictyomeridium amylosporum **B** – AP, PB, PE, SE, BA, MT, MS, RJ, SP, RS
- Dictyomeridium immersum **B** – AM, RO, CE
- Dictyomeridium isohypocrellinum **B** – AP, TO, CE, PB, SE
- Dictyomeridium paraproponens **B** – RO, PB, PE, SE
- Dictyomeridium proponens – AM, TO, MA, CE, PB, PE, AL, SE, BA, MT, MS, MG, SP, SC
- Dictyonema caespitosum **B** – MG, PR
- Dictyonema obscuratum **B** – SP
- Dictyonema phyllophilum – AC, AM, SP, PR
- Dictyonema schenckianum **B** – SC
- Dictyonema sericeum – AM, PA, PE, SE, MG, ES, RJ, SP, PR, SC, RS
- Dimelaena mayrhoferiana – BA, MT
- Dimelaena oreina – SE
- Dimelaena tenuis – MA, AL, SE, BA, MT, MS, MG, RJ, SP, RS
- Dimidiographa longissima – PE
- Diorygma africanum – PE, MS, ES
- Diorygma alagoense **B** – AM, PB, PE, AL, ES
- Diorygma album **B** – RJ
- Diorygma antillarum – AC, AM, AL, MT, MS, MG, ES, RJ, SP, SC, RS
- Diorygma circumfusum – SE, MS
- Diorygma confluens – AC, AM, RO, PA, AP, TO, CE, PE, AL, BA, MT, MS, ES, RJ, SP, SC
- Diorygma defectoisidiatum **B** – PA, TO
- Diorygma epiglaucum – RO, PE, SE, ES, RJ, SP
- Diorygma erythrellum – TO, AL, SE
- Diorygma fissuroxanthonicum **B** – AM, RO
- Diorygma gyrosum **B** – RO
- Diorygma hieroglyphicum – AC, AM, AP, PE, AL, SE, BA, MT, MS, GO, ES, RJ, SP, PR, SC, RS
- Diorygma incantatum **B** – TO, BA, PR
- Diorygma intermedium – PE, SP
- Diorygma isidiolichexanthonicum **B** – MS
- Diorygma junghuhnii – AM, RO, SE, MT, MS, MG, SC
- Diorygma lichexanthonicum **B** – AP
- Diorygma longisporum **B** – PE
- Diorygma microsporum **B** – PE, SE
- Diorygma minisporum – CE, PE, SE, BA
- Diorygma monophorum – SP
- Diorygma norsubmuriforme **B** – AP
- Diorygma pauciseptatum **B** – TO, SC
- Diorygma poitaei – AC, AM, RO, PA, AP, PB, PE, AL, SE, BA, MT, MS, GO, ES, RJ, SP, PR, RS
- Diorygma pruinosum **B** – PE, SE, BA, ES, SP, RS
- Diorygma reniforme – AM, AP, PE, AL, SE, BA, MT, MS, ES, SP, PR
- Diorygma salxanthonicum **B** – BA
- Diorygma sipmanii – PE, BA
- Diorygma sophianum **B** – PE
- Diorygma tibellii – PE, SP
- Diorygma tinctorium **B** – BA, RJ
- Diorygma tocantinense **B** – TO
- Diorygma toensbergianum **B** – BA
- Diploschistella urceolata – SE
- Diploschistes actinostomus – AM, PE, AL, SE, MT, MS, MG, ES, SP, PR, SC, RS
- Diploschistes aeneus – RJ, RS
- Diploschistes caesioplumbeus – SP
- Diploschistes cinereocaesius – RJ, RS
- Diploschistes conceptionis – RS
- Diploschistes diacapsis – SE, SC, RS
- Diploschistes euganeus – AL, SC
- Diploschistes hypoleucus **B** – SE, BA, MT, MS, MG, ES, RJ, PR, SC, RS
- Diploschistes ochraceus – RS
- Diploschistes scruposus – RJ, SP
- Dirina approximata – CE, PE, AL
- Dirinaria aegialita – RO, PA, TO, MA, MT, MS, GO, MG, SP, SC, RS
- Dirinaria africana – MS
- Dirinaria applanata – RO, PA, TO, MA, CE, RN, AL, BA, MT, MS, MG, RJ, SP, PR, SC
- Dirinaria aspera – MT, MG, SP, RS
- Dirinaria confluens – AM, PA, MA, CE, PB, PE, AL, SE, BA, MT, MS, MG, ES, RJ, RS
- Dirinaria confusa – PE, BA, MT, MG, RJ
- Dirinaria consimilis – BA, MT, MS, GO, RJ, SP
- Dirinaria endocrocea **B** – RJ
- Dirinaria leopoldii – TO, CE, PB, PE, AL, SE, BA, MS, ES
- Dirinaria melanocarpa – AM, PA, BA, MT, MS, SP, PR
- Dirinaria papillulifera – AM, RO, MS
- Dirinaria picta – AM, RO, AP, TO, MA, CE, RN, PE, AL, SE, BA, MT, MS, GO, DF, MG, ES, RJ, SP, PR, RS
- Dirinaria pruinosa **B** – PI, MS
- Dirinaria purpurascens – RO, TO, MA, CE, PE, BA, MT, MS, ES, SP, RS
- Dirinaria rhodocladonica **B** – MG, MS
- Dirinaria sekikaica – PE, BA, MT, MS, GO, RJ, SP
- Distopyrenis composita – SE, RS
- Dyplolabia afzelii – AC, AM, RO, PA, AP, TO, MA, CE, RN, PB, PE, AL, SE, BA, MT, MS, GO, ES, RJ, SP, PR, SC
- Dyplolabia oryzoides **B** – AM, PA, TO, MA, AL, SE, ES, SP

== E ==
- Echinoplaca bispora – AM, PE, MT, MS, SP
- Echinoplaca campanulata **B** – PB, AL, PE, SE, SP
- Echinoplaca caruaruensis **B** – PE
- Echinoplaca diffluens **B** – AM, RO, PE, AL, BA, MT, RS
- Echinoplaca epiphylla – AC, AM, RO, AP, PB, PE, AL, SE, BA, MT, ES, SP, SC, RS
- Echinoplaca epiphylloides – PE
- Echinoplaca handelii – PE, SE, SP
- Echinoplaca intercedens – PE, SE, BA
- Echinoplaca pellicula **B** – AC, PB, PE, AL, BA, MT, MS, RJ, SP, PR
- Echinoplaca pernambucensis **B** – PB, PE, SE, BA
- Echinoplaca similis – PE, AL, BA, MT, PR
- Echinoplaca tetrapla – RJ
- Efflorellia efflorescens – AC, AM, CE, RN, PB, PE, AL, SE, BA, MS, SC, RS
- Emmanuelia americana **B** – MG
- Emmanuelia conformis – MG, PR, RS
- Emmanuelia cuprea – MS, SC, RS
- Emmanuelia elaeodes **B** – MT, ES, RJ
- Emmanuelia erosa **B** – MS, MG, RJ, SP, PR, SC, RS
- Emmanuelia ornata **B** – MG, RJ, SP, SC, RS
- Emmanuelia patinifera **B** – MT, MS, RJ, SP, PR, SC, RS
- Emmanuelia pseudolivacea **B** – MS, MG, SP, PR, RS
- Emmanuelia ravenelii – MG
- Emmanuelia tenuis **B** – AL, MS, MG, ES, RJ, SP, PR, SC, RS
- Encephalographa anthracothecii – SE, SC
- Enchylium chacoense **B** – MS
- Enchylium conglomeratum – MT, MS, MG, RJ, SP, RS
- Enchylium tenax – MS, SC, RS
- Endocarpon malmeanum **B** – MS
- Endocarpon megapotamicum **B** – RS
- Endocarpon muelleri **B** – SP
- Endocarpon pallidulum – AM, RO, MA, CE, PE, AL, SE, BA, MT, MS, MG, ES, SP, SC, RS
- Endocarpon pusillum – MG, SP, RS
- Endocarpon riparium **B** – AP
- Endohyalina circumpallida – AL, MT, MS, SP
- Endohyalina rappii – SP
- Enterographa albopuncta – AP
- Enterographa angustissima – AM, RO
- Enterographa batistae **B** – PE, BA
- Enterographa byssoidea – AL
- Enterographa chiodectonoides **B** – PE, AL, SE, BA
- Enterographa compunctula – CE, PB, AL, SE, BA, RS
- Enterographa epiphylla – PE
- Enterographa glaucotremoides **B** – BA
- Enterographa kalbii **B** – GO
- Enterographa leucolyta – MG, SP, SC
- Enterographa lichexanthonica **B** – AM, AL, SC
- Enterographa multilocularis – AL, SP
- Enterographa pallidella – CE, RN, PB, PE, AL, SE, BA, SP
- Enterographa perez-higaredae – SE
- Enterographa quassiicola – PE, AL, SE, BA, MG, RJ, SP, SC, RS
- Enterographa rotundata **B** – CE, PE, BA
- Enterographa sipmanii – AP, CE, PB, PE, SE, BA
- Enterographa subquassiicola **B** – CE, PE, SE, BA, MS
- Enterographa subserialis – AM, MA, CE, PB, SE, SC
- Enterographa tropica – BA, MS, SP, SC
- Enterographa zephyri – RO
- Ephebe brasiliensis **B** – AM, MG, ES, RJ, SP, SC, RS
- Eremithallus marusae – PB, AL, SP
- Eremothecella calamicola – AC, AM, RO, PA, MA, PE, BA, MS, SP, PR, SC
- Eremothecella helicella **B** – RO
- Erioderma granulosum – SP
- Erioderma groendalianum – MG, RJ, SP
- Erioderma leylandii – MG, ES, RJ, SP, RS
- Erioderma marcellii – RJ
- Erioderma mollissimum – MG, RJ, PR, RS
- Erioderma sorediatum – MG, RJ, SP, SC
- Erioderma unguigerum – SP
- Erioderma velligerum – SP, PR
- Erioderma verruculosum – SP, PR
- Erioderma wrightii – RJ, SP, PR, SC
- Erythrodecton granulatum – AC, AM, RO, AP, PE, AL, SE, MT
- Eschatogonia angustiloba – AM, AP, BA
- Eschatogonia dissecta – AM, PA, AP, PE, AL, SE, MT, MS, GO
- Eschatogonia granulosorediata **B** – CE
- Eschatogonia minuta – AC, AM, RO, AP, BA, SC
- Eschatogonia prolifera – AC, AM, RO, PA, AP, BA, MT
- Eugeniella atrichoides **B** – RO, MT
- Eugeniella corallifera – PE
- Eugeniella leucocheila – AM, PA, PE, SE, MS, RJ, SP
- Eugeniella nigrodisca **B** – SE
- Eugeniella ortizii – MT
- Eugeniella psychotriae **B** – AM, RO, PA, MT
- Exiliseptum ocellatum **B** – AM

== F ==
- Fellhanera antennophora **B** – MG
- Fellhanera aurantiaca – SP
- Fellhanera badimioides – AM
- Fellhanera baeomycoides **B** – AM
- Fellhanera bouteillei – AM, CE, PE, AL, BA, MT, MS, RJ, SP, PR, SC, RS
- Fellhanera carnea – RO
- Fellhanera dictyospora – SP
- Fellhanera dispersa – AM, PE
- Fellhanera elliottii – SP, RS
- Fellhanera emarginata – AM, PE, RJ, SP
- Fellhanera fuscatula – AC, AM, RO, PE, SE, MT, MS, MG, RJ, SP, PR, SC
- Fellhanera laeticolor **B** – RS
- Fellhanera lambinonii – PE
- Fellhanera lisowskii – AM, PE, MG
- Fellhanera longispora – PE, SP
- Fellhanera microdiscus – AL, MS
- Fellhanera misionensis – PE, ES, SP
- Fellhanera montana – MT
- Fellhanera muhlei – AM, RO, MG, SP
- Fellhanera naevia – AM, PE, RJ, SP
- Fellhanera obscurata – SP
- Fellhanera ochracea – MS
- Fellhanera paradoxa – PE, SP, PR, SC
- Fellhanera parvula – RO, PE, RJ, SP
- Fellhanera pauciseptata – PE, SP
- Fellhanera pilomarginata – MS
- Fellhanera punctata **B** – AM, RO, PA
- Fellhanera rhaphidophylli – AC, AM, RO, PE, AL, MT, MS, RJ, SP, SC
- Fellhanera rubida **B** – AM, RO, PE, SE, MT, SP
- Fellhanera santessonii – PA, PE
- Fellhanera semecarpi – PE, SC, RS
- Fellhanera stanhopeae – AM, PA, PE, AL, MT, MG, RJ, SP, PR
- Fellhanera subfuscatula – PA, PE, MS, ES, SP, SC
- Fellhanera sublecanorina – AM, PA, CE, PE, AL, MT, MG, RJ, SP, SC
- Fellhanera submicrommata – RO
- Fellhanera substanhopeae **B** – PA, MT
- Fellhanera subternella – AM, RO, PE, MT, SP, RS
- Fellhanera termitophila **B** – AM, RO, PA, AP, MA, SE, MT, MS, MG
- Fellhanera tricharioides – AM, PE
- Fellhanera vandenberghenii – SP
- Fellhanera viridis – MT, MS
- Fellhanera viridisorediata – RO, MT, MS
- Fellhanera vulgata **B** – MT, MS, RS
- Fellhaneropsis vezdae – MT
- Fibrillithecis confusa **B** – BA, RJ, SP
- Fibrillithecis dehiscens **B** – AM
- Fibrillithecis insignis – RJ, SP
- Fibrillithecis sprucei **B** – AM, RO, BA
- Fissurina adscribens – PB
- Fissurina adscripturiens – MS
- Fissurina aggregata **B** – SP
- Fissurina aggregatula – RO, PB, SE
- Fissurina alboscripta – PB
- Fissurina alligatorensis – RO
- Fissurina amazonica **B** – AM, RO, PA, TO, MA, AL, MT
- Fissurina amyloidea **B** – RO, MS
- Fissurina analphabetica – MT
- Fissurina atlantica **B** – SE
- Fissurina babingtonii – AC, MT
- Fissurina bispora **B** – RO
- Fissurina bothynocarpa **B** – SE, MT, SP
- Fissurina carassensis **B** – MG
- Fissurina chapsoides – MT
- Fissurina chrysocarpa **B** – RO
- Fissurina cingalina – RO, MS
- Fissurina colliculosa – BA
- Fissurina columbina – SP, PR, SC, RS
- Fissurina comparilis – AC, RO, SE, MT, PR
- Fissurina comparimuralis **B** – SE, MS, RJ, PR
- Fissurina crystallifera – MS
- Fissurina diamantica – AM
- Fissurina dumastii – AC, AM, PA, PB, PE, AL, SE, BA, MT, MS, GO, DF, MG, RJ, SP, PR, RS
- Fissurina dumastioides – PE
- Fissurina duplicans **B** – RO
- Fissurina egena – RO, PE, SE
- Fissurina egenella **B** – MT, SP
- Fissurina endothallina **B** – AP
- Fissurina excavatisorediosa **B** – MS
- Fissurina globulifica – BA, RJ, SP
- Fissurina homichlodes **B** – RO, MT, SP, SC
- Fissurina hyalinella – RO
- Fissurina inabensis – RO
- Fissurina incondita – AM, MT
- Fissurina incrustans **B** – PA, PB, PE, AL, SE, MT, MG, SP, RS
- Fissurina insculpta **B** – PA, MT
- Fissurina instabilis – RO, AL, SE, BA, MT, SP, RS
- Fissurina irradians **B** – RJ
- Fissurina isohypocrellina **B** – AC
- Fissurina leuconephela – MG, RJ
- Fissurina lirelloreagens **B** – AM
- Fissurina macrospora **B** – RO
- Fissurina mexicana – SE, MS
- Fissurina muelleri **B** – SP
- Fissurina nigrolabiata – RN, AL
- Fissurina nitida **B** – BA, RJ
- Fissurina nitidescens – PE, MT, RJ, SP
- Fissurina pseudostromatica – AC, AM, RO, PA, AP, TO, MA, CE, RN, PB, PE, AL, SE, BA, MT, MS, GO, DF, MG, ES, PR, RS
- Fissurina radiata – AC, CE, PE, AL, SE, BA, MT, MS, SC, RS
- Fissurina reticulolirellina **B** – AP
- Fissurina rubiginosa – RO, PA, RJ, SP, RS
- Fissurina rufula – RN
- Fissurina scolecitis – AC, AM
- Fissurina subfurfuracea **B** – RO
- Fissurina subnitidula – MT
- Fissurina tachygrapha – CE, SE, RS
- Fissurina tectigera **B** – PA, BA, MS
- Fissurina varieseptata – MS
- Fissurina vermiculus **B** – RJ
- Flabelloporina squamulifera – AC, PE, ES
- Flagellostrigula laureriformis – CE, RN
- Flagellostrigula pyrenuloides **B** – MS
- Flakea papillata – AM, RO, CE, PE, BA, MT, MS, SP, SC, RS
- Flavobathelium epiphyllum – AM, PA, MT, SP
- Flavoparmelia caperata – MT, SP, PR
- Flavoparmelia exornata – PE, MG, PR, RS
- Flavoparmelia leucoxantha – PE, MT, SP
- Flavoparmelia papillosa – PR, SC, RS
- Flavoparmelia plicata **B** – RO
- Flavoparmelia rutidota – PE, RS
- Flavoparmelia soredians – SE, PR
- Flavoparmelia subamplexa – DF, SP, PR
- Flegographa leprieurii – AM, RO, PA, AP, SE, MT, MS
- Fluctua megapotamica **B** – BA, MT, RJ, SP, PR, SC, RS
- Fouragea filicina – AM, PA, CE, PB, PE, AL, SE, BA, MT, MG, ES, RJ, SP, SC, RS
- Fouragea puiggarii **B** – PE, BA, MG, ES, SP, SC
- Fuscidea kochiana – MG
- Fuscidea lightfootii – MG
- Fuscidea lobata **B** – SP
- Fuscidea tropicavan – MG, ES, RJ
- Fuscidea umbricolor – MG, RJ, PR

== G ==
- Gassicurtia acidobaeomyceta **B** – BA, SP, SC
- Gassicurtia caririensis **B** – TO, CE, SE, BA
- Gassicurtia catasema – CE, RN, AL, SE, BA, MT, GO, RJ, SP, SC
- Gassicurtia coccifera **B** – MT
- Gassicurtia coccinea – AC, AM, RO, MA, CE, RN, AL, SE, BA, MT, MS, MG, SP, RS
- Gassicurtia coccinoides **B** – MT, GO
- Gassicurtia elizae **B** – SE
- Gassicurtia endococcinea **B** – MA, MG
- Gassicurtia ferruginascens **B** – CE, AL, MT
- Gassicurtia lopesiana **B** – MT
- Gassicurtia manguensia **B** – SP
- Gassicurtia pruinosa **B** – MT
- Gassicurtia restingiana **B** – BA, MT
- Gassicurtia rhizocarpoides **B** – BA, MT
- Gassicurtia rubromarginata **B** – CE
- Gassicurtia rufofuscescens **B** – CE, AL, MG, SP
- Gassicurtia subpulchella – SE, BA, MS, SP
- Gassicurtia vernicoma – AL
- Glaucotrema bahianum **B** – BA
- Glaucotrema costaricense – PB, AL, MT
- Glaucotrema glaucophaenum – AC, AM, RO, PA, AP, PB, PE, SE, BA, MT, MS, SP
- Glaucotrema inspersum **B** – RO
- Glaucotrema negativum **B** – AM
- Glaucotrema stegoboloides **B** – RO, BA
- Glomerulophoron confluentisorediatum **B** – AM, MA, SC
- Glyphis atrofusca – MS
- Glyphis cicatricosa – AC, RO, AP, TO, MA, CE, RN, PB, PE, AL, SE, BA, MT, MS, GO, DF, MG, ES, RJ, SP, PR, SC, RS
- Glyphis conglomerata **B** – MT
- Glyphis scyphulifera – PA, AP, TO, MA, CE, RN, PB, PE, AL, SE, BA, MT, MS, GO, MG, RJ, SP, RS
- Glyphis substriatula – CE, RN, AL, SE, MS, RJ, SP
- Glyphis triseptata **B** – BA, MT, MG, SP, RS
- Gomphillus hyalinus – SP, SC, RS
- Granulopyrenis hymnothora **B** – AM
- Granulopyrenis portoricensis – PE
- Graphina chlamydospora **B** – MT (provisionally accepted)
- Graphis adpressa – PR
- Graphis alba **B** – SE
- Graphis albissima – PB
- Graphis alboglaucescens – SE
- Graphis analoga – MS, MG, SP
- Graphis anfractuosa **B** – AM, RO, PA, CE, RN, PB, PE, AL, SE, BA, ES, RJ, SP, PR, RS
- Graphis antillarum – MT, MG
- Graphis apertella – SP
- Graphis appendiculata – MS, SP
- Graphis arbusculiformis – RO, PB, PE, AL
- Graphis archeri **B** – PR, RS
- Graphis arecae – SE
- Graphis assimilis – PE, BA, MT, MS, MG, RJ, RS
- Graphis aurita **B** – AC, PA, CE, PB, SE, MT, MS
- Graphis bipartita – MS, ES, RS
- Graphis borealis – SE
- Graphis brachycarpoides **B** – MG (provisionally accepted)
- Graphis brahmanensis **B** – PE, AL, SE
- Graphis bungartzii – SE
- Graphis caesiella – AC, RO, TO, MA, CE, RN, PE, AL, SE, BA, MT, MS, MG, RJ, SP, PR, RS
- Graphis caesiocarpa **B** – AC, PE, SE, MT, MS, RS
- Graphis cervinonigra – PR
- Graphis chamelensis – ES, PR
- Graphis chlorotica – PE, AL
- Graphis cincta – RO, CE, PB, PE, AL, SE, BA, MS, ES, PR, RS
- Graphis componens – MS, SP, SC
- Graphis conferta – TO, CE, PB, PE, SE, BA, GO, RJ, SP, PR
- Graphis copelandii – RO, AP, TO, MA
- Graphis crassilabra – SE
- Graphis crebra – CE, PE, MT, MS, SP, PR, RS
- Graphis cremicolor – AM, AP, MG
- Graphis cupei – AM, CE, SE, PR, SC
- Graphis cycasicola – AP
- Graphis decussata **B** – RJ (provisionally accepted)
- Graphis dendrogramma – RO, AP, PE, SE, MS, RS
- Graphis descissa – SE
- Graphis deserpens – TO
- Graphis desquamescens – AL, SE, RJ, SP, PR
- Graphis dichotoma **B** – MT, SP
- Graphis dimidiata **B** – RO, MT, MG
- Graphis disserpens – SE, BA
- Graphis dracaenae – AC, PB, PE, SE, MT, MG, ES, PR, RS
- Graphis dupaxana – RO, CE, PE, SE, MT, RJ, SP, PR, RS
- Graphis duplicata – TO, RN, PE, AL, SE, BA, MT, MG, RJ, SP, PR, SC, RS
- Graphis duplicatoinspersa – PB, PE, SE, RJ, RS
- Graphis dussii – SP
- Graphis elegans – SE, RS
- Graphis emersa – PE, PR
- Graphis erythrocardia – RN, MS
- Graphis evirescens **B** – AC, SP, RS
- Graphis exalbata – MT
- Graphis farinulenta – MT, MS
- Graphis fasciata **B** – BA
- Graphis ferruginea – RN
- Graphis flavovirens – SE
- Graphis flexuosa – RJ (provisionally accepted)
- Graphis fumosa – AM
- Graphis furcata – TO, MA, CE, PB, PE, AL, SE, BA, MS, MG, ES, SP, PR, RS
- Graphis geraensis – PE, MS, RS
- Graphis glaucescens – AC, AM, RO, PA, AP, TO, MA, CE, RN, PB, PE, AL, SE, BA, MT, MS, MG, RJ, SP
- Graphis gloriosensis – RS
- Graphis gonimica – RO, PB, PE
- Graphis gracillima – RJ, SP
- Graphis granulocarpa **B** – SP, RS
- Graphis haleana – PB, AL, SE, BA, MT
- Graphis halonata **B** – MG
- Graphis handelii – PB, AL, SE, MT, MS, MG, ES, PR, RS
- Graphis hatschbachii **B** – PR
- Graphis hiascens – MA
- Graphis hordeiformis **B** – AM (provisionally accepted)
- Graphis hyphosa **B** – CE, SE, BA, MT, MS, SP
- Graphis immersella – PE, SE, RS
- Graphis immersicans – AM, CE, PE, SE
- Graphis implicata **B** – AC, SE, MT, RJ, PR
- Graphis inopinata **B** – PR
- Graphis inspersonorstictica **B** – AL
- Graphis inspersoradians – SE, BA, MT
- Graphis intermedians – PR, RS
- Graphis intermediella – SE
- Graphis intricata – RO, PE, SE, MT, MS, SP, PR, RS
- Graphis inversa – MT, RS
- Graphis irradians – RJ
- Graphis jeanmuelleri – SP
- Graphis jejuensis – PR, RS
- Graphis kelungana – PB
- Graphis lapidicola – RO, RJ, SP
- Graphis leptocarpa – PB, PE, AL, SE, BA, MS, RJ, SP, PR, RS
- Graphis leptoclada – CE, RN, PE, SE, BA, MT, PR, RS
- Graphis librata – AC, MA, PI, PB, PE, AL, SE, BA, MS, RJ, SP, PR, RS
- Graphis lineola – AM, TO, MA, CE, PB, PE, AL, SE, BA, MT, MS, MG, RJ, SP, PR, RS
- Graphis litoralis – PR, RS
- Graphis longispora – RS
- Graphis lucifica – AL, MT, PR
- Graphis lueckingii **B** – PR, RS
- Graphis macrocarpa – RS
- Graphis marusae – RS
- Graphis mellis-insulae **B** – PR
- Graphis microsperma – AM
- Graphis modesta – AP, CE, AL, SE
- Graphis myrtacea **B** – MT, MS, SP, PR, SC
- Graphis nanodes – RO, MA, SE, BA, RS
- Graphis negrosina – SE, BA
- Graphis neoelongata **B** – MT, MG
- Graphis nilgiriensis – PB
- Graphis norsorediata **B** – MS
- Graphis norstictica – MA, SE
- Graphis novopalmicola – MG
- Graphis oxyclada – RO, CE, PB, PE, SE, MS, RS
- Graphis palmicola – SE
- Graphis palmyrensis – PE, SE
- Graphis paradisserpens – SE, BA
- Graphis paralleloides – AC, PE, AL, SE, BA, MT, MS, RS
- Graphis paranaensis **B** – PR, RS
- Graphis paraserpens – PE, RS
- Graphis parilis **B** – MT, MS, RJ, RS
- Graphis pernambucoradians **B** – AM, RO, PA, AP, PE, AL, SE, BA, MT, GO, DF, ES, SC, RS
- Graphis pinicola – AM, PB, PE, AL, SE, BA, MT, MS, PR, RS
- Graphis platycarpa **B** – PA, MS, RJ, SP, SC, RS
- Graphis plumierae – SE, MS
- Graphis polyclades – RO
- Graphis polystriatosubmuriformis **B** – AP
- Graphis proserpens **B** – MG, RJ
- Graphis prunicola – MA, PE, PR
- Graphis puiggarii **B** – AM, BA, MT, MS, RJ, SP, RS
- Graphis pustulosa **B** – RO
- Graphis pyrrhocheiloides – RO, AP, SE, BA, MS, PR
- Graphis redingeriana **B** – MT, SP
- Graphis renschiana – MT
- Graphis rondoniana **B** – RO
- Graphis rosae-emiliae – RS
- Graphis rosalbinana – MS
- Graphis schiffneri – PE, RS
- Graphis schroederi – RS
- Graphis scripta – TO, CE, PB, PE, AL, SE, RJ, SP, SC, RS
- Graphis seminuda – MS
- Graphis slendrae – SE
- Graphis stenograpta **B** – SP (provisionally accepted)
- Graphis stellata **B** – AM, RO, AL, SE, BA
- Graphis stipitata – AM, CE, SE
- Graphis striata – AM (provisionally accepted)
- Graphis streblocarpa – AL, MG, SP
- Graphis streimannii – SE, RS
- Graphis subaltamirensis – SE
- Graphis subcontorta – MS
- Graphis subcupei **B** – PR
- Graphis subfiliformis **B** – PE
- Graphis subhiascens – AM, PE, MG
- Graphis submarginata – CE, PB, PE, AL, SE, MS, ES, RS
- Graphis subserpentina – RO, PA, MA, RJ
- Graphis subtecta – AM, RO, PA, MT, ES, SP, RS
- Graphis subtenella – SE, MS
- Graphis subtracta – RJ
- Graphis subvirginea **B** – AM, SE, RJ
- Graphis sundarbarensis – SE
- Graphis supracola – SE, RJ
- Graphis suzanae **B** – RS
- Graphis symplecta – MT, MS
- Graphis syzygii – AM
- Graphis tenella – PA, MA, RN, PE, AL, SE, BA, MT, DF, MG, RJ, PR, RS
- Graphis tenoriensis – PE
- Graphis tenuirima – SE, MS
- Graphis tetralocularis – RO
- Graphis tricolor **B** – MS
- Graphis urandrae – AP, MA, CE, SE, PR, RS
- Graphis valvulescens – RJ (provisionally accepted)
- Graphis verrucariiformis – State unknown (provisionally accepted)
- Graphis verrucoserpens – PB
- Graphis viridithallina **B** – SE
- Graphis xylophaga – AL, RS
- Gyalecta carneoluteola – CE, PE, MT, MS, SP
- Gyalecta coralloidea **B** – MG
- Gyalecta geoicoides **B** – MT, MS, MG
- Gyalecta nana – PE, AL, MS, RS
- Gyalecta perithecioidea **B** – MS
- Gyalecta saxatilis – MS
- Gyalecta uniseptata **B** – MS
- Gyalectidium areolatum – PE, SE, SP
- Gyalectidium aurelii **B** – MT
- Gyalectidium batistianum **B** – PE
- Gyalectidium catenulatum **B** – AM, RO, PB, PE, MS, SP, PR, SC, RS
- Gyalectidium caucasicum – PE, SE, BA, ES, RJ, SP, PR, SC, RS
- Gyalectidium ciliatum – RS
- Gyalectidium denticulatum – PE, SE, RJ
- Gyalectidium eskuchei **B** – RS
- Gyalectidium filicinum **B** – AC, AM, PA, PB, PE, AL, SE, BA, MT, MS, MG, ES, RJ, SP, PR, SC, RS
- Gyalectidium fuscum – PE
- Gyalectidium imperfectum – PB, PE, SE, BA, MT, MG, RJ, PR, SC, RS
- Gyalectidium laciniatum – PB
- Gyalectidium maracae – SP
- Gyalectidium puntilloi – SE
- Gyalidea concava **B** – SE, BA
- Gyalidea mexicana – AL, MT, SC
- Gyalideopsis aequatoriana – CE, SE
- Gyalideopsis altamirensis – CE, SC
- Gyalideopsis applanata – MS, RJ
- Gyalideopsis aptrootii **B** – BA, SC
- Gyalideopsis argentea – MG
- Gyalideopsis brevipilosa – SC
- Gyalideopsis confluens **B** – RO, SE, BA, MT, MS, GO, ES, SP, RS
- Gyalideopsis crenata **B** – SC
- Gyalideopsis ellipsoidea **B** – CE
- Gyalideopsis giganteoides – MT, RS
- Gyalideopsis glauca – SP
- Gyalideopsis haliotidiformis **B** – MT, MS, SP
- Gyalideopsis hyalinocoronata **B** – RO
- Gyalideopsis intermedia – PE
- Gyalideopsis kalbii **B** – MS, SP
- Gyalideopsis lambinonii – AP, SE, BA, MT, MS, GO, MG, SP
- Gyalideopsis lecideina **B** – MG
- Gyalideopsis macarthurii – SC
- Gyalideopsis marcellii **B** – BA, SP
- Gyalideopsis palmata **B** – SE, BA, MT
- Gyalideopsis poeltii **B** – SP
- Gyalideopsis robusta **B** – SP
- Gyalideopsis rostrata **B** – AP, MS, RS
- Gyalideopsis rubescens – PE, SP
- Gyalideopsis rubrofusca **B** – SE, MG, SP
- Gyalideopsis vainioi **B** – AL, BA, MS, GO, MG, SP
- Gyalideopsis verruculosa – PE
- Gyalideopsis vezdae **B** – MT
- Gymnographa medusulina **B** – BA
- Gyrotrema album **B** – AM, RO
- Gyrotrema flavum **B** – AM, RO
- Gyrotrema sinuosum – AM, RO

== H ==
- Haematomma accolens – BA, MS
- Haematomma africanum – SE, BA, MG, RJ, SP, SC, RS
- Haematomma collatum – MG, ES, RS
- Haematomma fenzlianum – RS
- Haematomma flexuosum – CE, PE, AL, MT, MS, GO, MG, RJ, SP, SC, RS
- Haematomma fluorescens **B** – PE, MG, RJ, SP
- Haematomma infuscum – SE
- Haematomma leprarioides **B** – AL, SE, RJ, RS
- Haematomma matogrossense **B** – SE, BA, MT, MS, MG, ES
- Haematomma persoonii – CE, PB, PE, AL, SE, BA, MS, ES, RJ, SC, RS
- Haematomma rufidulum – BA, MG, RJ, SP
- Haematomma sorediatum – MT, SP
- Haematomma subinnatum **B** – MS
- Haematomma sulphureum **B** – BA, MG, ES, RJ, SP, SC
- Halecania subsquamosa **B** – SP
- Halegrapha redonographoides **B** – TO, SE
- Heiomasia hypostictica **B** – AM
- Helminthocarpon leprevostii – PE, AL, SE, RJ, SP
- Heppia despreauxii – CE, MS
- Heppia fuscata **B** – RJ
- Heppia murorum **B** – RJ
- Herpothallon adnatum – AM, RO, BA
- Herpothallon aurantiacoflavum – AC, AM, RO, PA, AP, PE, AL, SE, BA, MT, RS
- Herpothallon brialmonticum – MT
- Herpothallon cinereum – SP
- Herpothallon echinatum – RO, MS, RS
- Herpothallon fertile – PA, MS
- Herpothallon minimum – AM, RO, RS
- Herpothallon nigroisidiatum – AM, RO, RS
- Herpothallon philippinum – PA, MT
- Herpothallon psorpseudisidiatum **B** – SE, SC
- Herpothallon purpureum **B** – SP, PR
- Herpothallon pustulatum – AC, MG, SP, SC, RS
- Herpothallon roseocinctum **B** – AM, RO, PA, AP, PE, AL, SE, MT, MS, MG, ES, SP, PR, SC, RS
- Herpothallon rubrocinctum **B** – AM, RO, PE, AL, SE, BA, MG, ES, RJ, SP, PR, SC, RS
- Herpothallon rubromaculatum – AM, RO, PA
- Herpothallon tricolor **B** – AC, BA, ES, SC
- Heterocyphelium leucampyx – PA, TO, SE, BA, MT, MS, RS
- Heterocyphelium triseptatum **B** – AC, TO, MT
- Heterodermia africana – SP
- Heterodermia albicans – PE, AL, SE, MT, MS, MG, RJ, SP, PR, SC, RS
- Heterodermia allardii – MT, MG, SP
- Heterodermia amphilacinulata **B** – SP
- Heterodermia apicalis **B** – MT
- Heterodermia appendiculata – MG
- Heterodermia barbifera – SP
- Heterodermia borphyllidiata **B** – MG
- Heterodermia boryi – BA, MT, MG, ES, RJ, SP, PR, SC, RS
- Heterodermia caneziae **B** – GO, ES, RS
- Heterodermia casarettiana – PA, PE, MT, MG, ES, RJ, SP, PR, RS
- Heterodermia circinalis – MG, RJ, SP
- Heterodermia comosa – PA, BA, MT, GO, DF, MG, ES, RJ, SP, SC, RS
- Heterodermia corallophora – MG, RJ, SP, PR, SC, RS
- Heterodermia corcovadensis – MG, RJ, RS
- Heterodermia crocea – PE, SC
- Heterodermia cubensis – MG
- Heterodermia dactyliza – PA, BA, MG, ES, RJ
- Heterodermia delicatula **B** – SP
- Heterodermia dendritica – GO, MG, RJ, SP, RS
- Heterodermia diademata – PA, MT, MS, GO, DF, MG, ES, RJ, SP, RS
- Heterodermia dissecta – PE, AL
- Heterodermia dissecticodiademata **B** – SC, RS
- Heterodermia dissecticoflabellata **B** – MS, MG
- Heterodermia fertilis – MG
- Heterodermia flabellata – PA, PE, MT, MS, GO, MG, ES, RJ, SP, PR, SC, RS
- Heterodermia flavodactyliza **B** – MG
- Heterodermia flavosquamosa – MS, SP, PR, SC, RS
- Heterodermia flavulifera **B** – RS
- Heterodermia galactophylla – PA, SE, MT, MG, RJ, SP, PR, SC, RS
- Heterodermia hypocaesia – MS, MG
- Heterodermia hypochraea – SP, PR, RS
- Heterodermia hypoleuca – MT, GO, MG, RJ, SC, RS
- Heterodermia isidiophora – RJ, SP, SC, RS
- Heterodermia japonica – PE, AL, SE, BA, MT, GO, MG, ES, RJ, SP, PR, SC, RS
- Heterodermia labiata **B** – SP
- Heterodermia lamelligera – MS, RJ
- Heterodermia lepidota – SP
- Heterodermia leucomelos – PA, PE, AL, MG, ES, RJ, SP, PR, SC, RS
- Heterodermia loriformis – MS
- Heterodermia lutescens – AL, GO, MG, RJ, SP, PR, SC, RS
- Heterodermia macrosoraliata **B** – SP, SC
- Heterodermia magellanica – RJ, SP, PR, SC, RS
- Heterodermia major – MG, RS
- Heterodermia microphylla – BA, MS, MG, RJ, SP, RS
- Heterodermia minor **B** – MT
- Heterodermia mobergiana – MT, MG, PR, SC, RS
- Heterodermia namaquana – SP
- Heterodermia neocomosa – MS
- Heterodermia neocrocea **B** – SC
- Heterodermia nigromarginata **B** – BA, MG, RJ
- Heterodermia obscurata – RO, PA, CE, PE, AL, SE, BA, MT, MS, GO, DF, MG, ES, RJ, SP, PR, SC, RS
- Heterodermia palpebrata – State not indicated
- Heterodermia phyllalbicans **B** – MS
- Heterodermia podocarpa – PA, PE, MT, GO, MG, RJ, SP, SC, RS
- Heterodermia propagulifera – MT, DF, MG, ES, SP, PR, SC, RS
- Heterodermia pseudospeciosa – MT, MS, MG, RJ, SP, SC, RS
- Heterodermia rugulosa – SP
- Heterodermia sorediosa – AL, MS
- Heterodermia spathulifera – MG, SP
- Heterodermia speciosa – PA, CE, PE, AL, BA, MT, MS, DF, MG, ES, RJ, SP, SC, RS
- Heterodermia spielmannii **B** – RS
- Heterodermia spinigera – RS
- Heterodermia squamulosa – MT, SP, PR, SC, RS
- Heterodermia stellata – MG, SP, SC
- Heterodermia subcitrina – RS
- Heterodermia sublinearis **B** – SP
- Heterodermia togashii – ES
- Heterodermia tremulans – AP, CE, PE, AL, BA, MT, MS, DF, MG, ES, RJ, SP, PR, SC, RS
- Heterodermia trichophora – RJ, SP, PR, RS
- Heterodermia vulgaris – MS, DF, MG, ES, RJ, SP, PR, SC, RS
- Heteromyces rubescens **B** – SP
- Hondaria leptosporum **B** – MT, MS
- Hymenelia ceracea – SC, RS
- Hymenelia epulotica – MT
- Hymenelia prevostii – MS
- Hyperphyscia adglutinata – RO, CE, PE, SE, BA, MT, MS, GO, PR, SC, RS
- Hyperphyscia carassensis **B** – BA, MG, RS
- Hyperphyscia cochlearis – RO, CE, SE, MT, MS, SP, PR, RS
- Hyperphyscia coralloidea **B** – RS
- Hyperphyscia endochrysea – MS
- Hyperphyscia granulata – AL, BA, MS, GO, MG, SP, SC
- Hyperphyscia isidiata – MS, SP
- Hyperphyscia minor – MS, ES, RJ, SP, RS
- Hyperphyscia mobergii – PE, BA, MS, ES, PR
- Hyperphyscia pandani – MS, SP
- Hyperphyscia pseudocoralloides – MS, SP, PR
- Hyperphyscia pyrithrocardia – RO
- Hyperphyscia syncolla – MT, MS, MG, RJ, SP, PR, RS
- Hyperphyscia tuckermanii **B** – MS, ES, RJ, SP, RS
- Hyperphyscia variabilis – SE, RS
- Hyperphyscia viridissima – MT, MS, ES, RS
- Hypoflavia velloziae **B** – PE, BA, MG
- Hypotrachyna adaffinis – MG, SP
- Hypotrachyna alectorialorum **B** – MG, SC
- Hypotrachyna aspera **B** – MS, MG, PR
- Hypotrachyna aurantiacoreagens **B** – RJ
- Hypotrachyna bahiana **B** – RR, PE, AL, SE, BA, MT, MG, ES, RJ, SP, PR, SC, RS
- Hypotrachyna brasiliana **B** – BA, GO, MG, RJ, SP, PR, SC
- Hypotrachyna brueggeri **B** – MG, SP, SC
- Hypotrachyna cauliflora **B** – RJ
- Hypotrachyna cerradensis **B** – CE, GO, PR
- Hypotrachyna chlorina **B** – MG, ES, RJ, SP, PR, RS
- Hypotrachyna cirrhata – MG, RJ, SP, PR, RS
- Hypotrachyna contradicta **B** – BA, MG, ES, RJ, SC, RS
- Hypotrachyna croceopustulata – BA, RJ, SP, RS
- Hypotrachyna cryptochlora – BA, RS
- Hypotrachyna cunhaensis **B** – RJ
- Hypotrachyna dactylifera **B** – MS, MG, RJ, SP, SC, RS
- Hypotrachyna damaziana **B** – MG, RJ, SP, PR
- Hypotrachyna degelii – PA, BA, MT, MS, GO, DF, MG, ES, RJ, SP, PR, SC, RS
- Hypotrachyna dentella – CE, MT, GO, MG, RJ, SP, PR, RS
- Hypotrachyna divaricatica **B** – GO
- Hypotrachyna ducalis – DF, RS
- Hypotrachyna eitenii **B** – BA, MT, MG, ES, RJ, PR, RS
- Hypotrachyna enderythraea – MG
- Hypotrachyna endochlora – RJ, SP, PR, SC, RS
- Hypotrachyna erythrodes **B** – PE, MG, RJ, SC
- Hypotrachyna everniiformis **B** – RJ
- Hypotrachyna exsplendens – MT
- Hypotrachyna flavida **B** – AL, BA, GO, MG, ES, RJ, SP, PR, SC
- Hypotrachyna fletcheri **B** – MG, RJ, SP
- Hypotrachyna goiasii **B** – GO
- Hypotrachyna gracilescens **B** – BA, MG, SC
- Hypotrachyna heteroloba **B** – ES, RJ, RS
- Hypotrachyna horrescens – BA, MT, GO, DF, MG, ES, RJ, SP, PR, SC, RS
- Hypotrachyna hypoalectorialica **B** – MG, RJ, PR
- Hypotrachyna imbricatula **B** – AM, AL, BA, MT, DF, MG, RJ, SP, PR, SC, RS
- Hypotrachyna immaculata – MG, RJ
- Hypotrachyna intercalanda **B** – MT, MG, ES, RJ, SP, PR, SC, RS
- Hypotrachyna isidiocera – MG, RJ
- Hypotrachyna jamesii – MT, DF
- Hypotrachyna kalbii **B** – AL, SP
- Hypotrachyna klauskalbii **B** – SP
- Hypotrachyna kriegeri **B** – MG, SP
- Hypotrachyna laevigata – MG, RJ, SC, RS
- Hypotrachyna livida – BA, MT, MS, MG, RJ, SP, PR, SC, RS
- Hypotrachyna lividescens – SC, RS
- Hypotrachyna maculata **B** – BA
- Hypotrachyna malmei **B** – MA, MT, MS, MG, SP, PR, RS
- Hypotrachyna mattickiana **B** – MG, RJ, SP, PR, SC, RS
- Hypotrachyna meridensis – RR, PA, MG, ES, RJ, SC
- Hypotrachyna microblasta **B** – GO, MG, ES, PR
- Hypotrachyna minarum **B** – AM, PE, AL, SE, BA, MT, GO, DF, MG, ES, SP, PR, SC, RS
- Hypotrachyna minuscula **B** – MG
- Hypotrachyna mirabilis **B** – SP
- Hypotrachyna nana **B** – CE, MG
- Hypotrachyna neocrenata – PE, MG
- Hypotrachyna neodissecta – BA, PR, RS
- Hypotrachyna neohorrescens **B** – MG, SP
- Hypotrachyna novella **B** – BA, MT, MS, DF, MG, RJ, SP, RS
- Hypotrachyna obscurella **B** – BA, MG, RJ, SP
- Hypotrachyna osorioi – RS
- Hypotrachyna osseoalba – PA, AL, BA, MS, MG, ES, RJ, SP, PR, SC, RS
- Hypotrachyna osteoleuca – MT, RJ, SC
- Hypotrachyna peruviana – MG, RJ, SC, RS
- Hypotrachyna physcioides – PA, MT, MG, ES, SP
- Hypotrachyna pluriformis **B** – MG, RJ, SP, PR, RS
- Hypotrachyna polydactyla – MS, MG, ES, RJ, SP, PR, RS
- Hypotrachyna prolongata – RJ
- Hypotrachyna protenta – BA, MT, MG, ES, RJ, SP, PR, SC, RS
- Hypotrachyna protochlorina **B** – SE, MG, RJ, SP
- Hypotrachyna protoformosana – AL, BA, MT, MG, SP
- Hypotrachyna pseudosinuosa – BA, MG, RJ, SP, RS
- Hypotrachyna punoensis – RS
- Hypotrachyna pustulifera – MS, PR, RS
- Hypotrachyna revoluta – MG, RJ, RS
- Hypotrachyna rhabdiformis – SE
- Hypotrachyna rockii – SE, MG, RJ, SP, PR, RS
- Hypotrachyna salreducens **B** – GO, MG
- Hypotrachyna schindleri **B** – BA, MG, ES, RJ, SP, PR, SC, RS
- Hypotrachyna silvatica **B** – AM, PA, MT, MS, DF, MG, SP, PR
- Hypotrachyna singularis – MG, SP
- Hypotrachyna sordidella **B** – MG, RJ
- Hypotrachyna spathulata – MG, SP, RS
- Hypotrachyna spumosa – AL, MT, MS, RJ, SP, PR, SC, RS
- Hypotrachyna steyermarkii – MG, SP, RS
- Hypotrachyna subaffinis – DF, MG
- Hypotrachyna subfatiscens – AL, BA, MT, MS, DF, ES, SP, PR, RS
- Hypotrachyna subformosana **B** – PA, PE, BA, DF, MG, ES, SP
- Hypotrachyna sublaevigata – MG, SP, RS
- Hypotrachyna subpustulifera – MS, MG, RJ, SP
- Hypotrachyna tibellii – MG
- Hypotrachyna tombadorensis **B** – BA
- Hypotrachyna vainioi **B** – MG
- Hypotrachyna velloziae **B** – DF, MG
- Hypotrachyna vexans – MG, RJ, SP, PR, SC, RS
- Hypotrachyna virensica **B** – BA, MG, SP, SC
- Hypotrachyna zahlbruckneri **B** – PA, MT, MS, GO, MG, SP, PR, SC, RS

== I ==
- Imshaugia pyxiniformis **B** – PA
- Inoderma subabietinum – SP
- Ionaspis lacustris – MG, RJ, SP, SC

== J ==
- Jamesiella chaverriae – MS, SC
- Jamesiella clavata **B** – BA
- Jamesiella elongata **B** – SC
- Jenmania goebelii – RS
- Jenmania osorioi – AL, BA, MS, RS
- Julella geminella – MS
- Julella lactea – CE, PE
- Julella sublactea – MS
- Julella vitrispora – CE, BA, MS, GO

== K ==
- Kalbiana brasiliensis **B** – BA
- Kalbographa cabbalistica – MG
- Koerberiella wimmeriana – MG
- Krogia antillarum – PA
- Lecidea acuti **B** – RS (provisionally accepted)
- Lecidea aequalibis **B** – MT (provisionally accepted)
- Lecidea angolensis – RS (provisionally accepted)
- Lecidea araucariae **B** – SP (provisionally accepted)
- Lecidea caesiella **B** – SP (provisionally accepted)
- Lecidea centralis **B** – MT, MG (provisionally accepted)
- Lecidea chapadensis **B** – MT (provisionally accepted)
- Lecidea chondroides **B** – AM (provisionally accepted)
- Lecidea coelopa **B** – AM (provisionally accepted)
- Lecidea diploella **B** – AM (provisionally accepted)
- Lecidea erumpens **B** – SP (provisionally accepted)
- Lecidea eubuelliana **B** – MG (provisionally accepted)
- Lecidea inolascens – MG (provisionally accepted)
- Lecidea irrigata **B** – MT (provisionally accepted)
- Lecidea leucina **B** – SP (provisionally accepted)
- Lecidea lunulans – RJ (provisionally accepted)
- Lecidea luridescens – MG (provisionally accepted)
- Lecidea mattogrossensis **B** – MT (provisionally accepted)
- Lecidea microlepidea **B** – SP (provisionally accepted)
- Lecidea minarum **B** – MG (provisionally accepted)
- Lecidea mutabilis – RJ (provisionally accepted)
- Lecidea myriotrema **B** – SP (provisionally accepted)
- Lecidea nigrificata **B** – MG (provisionally accepted)
- Lecidea pernigrata **B** – MG (provisionally accepted)
- Lecidea pseudosema **B** – SP (provisionally accepted)
- Lecidea pteridophila **B** – SP (provisionally accepted)
- Lecidea rebelliosa **B** – RS (provisionally accepted)
- Lecidea rigida **B** – MG (provisionally accepted)
- Lecidea rinodina **B** – RJ (provisionally accepted)
- Lecidea sinapisperma **B** – RJ (provisionally accepted)
- Lecidea sororiella – RJ (provisionally accepted)
- Lecidea sphaerospora **B** – RS (provisionally accepted)
- Lecidea translucida – MG (provisionally accepted)
- Lecidea urotheca **B** – SP (provisionally accepted)
- Lecidea wawreana **B** – State unknown (provisionally accepted)
- Lopadium castaneum – AM (provisionally accepted)
- Lopadium murinum **B** – MG (provisionally accepted)

== L ==
- Lambiella insularis – MG
- Lasioloma arachnoideum – AM, PA, PE, SE, BA, MT, MG, SP
- Lasioloma stephanellum – PE, SE
- Lasioloma trichophorum – MA
- Lathagrium cristatum – MS
- Lecanactis abietina – SP
- Lecanactis caesia **B** – SP
- Lecanactis elaeocarpa – RO, PE, SE, BA, MT, MS, SP, SC
- Lecanactis epileuca – PE, AL, SE, BA, MG, ES, RJ, SP, PR, SC
- Lecanactis inferior **B** – RJ
- Lecanactis malmideoides **B** – SP
- Lecanactis rufoatra **B** – SP
- Lecania adplicita **B** – RJ (provisionally accepted)
- Lecania coarctatula **B** – SP (provisionally accepted)
- Lecania nigrella **B** – SP (provisionally accepted)
- Lecania sulphurella **B** – SP (provisionally accepted)
- Lecania variocolorata **B** – AM
- Lecanographa farinulenta **B** – RJ, SC
- Lecanographa illecebrosula – PE, BA
- Lecanographa lynceoides – RO, MS
- Lecanographa subcaesia **B** – BA, MT
- Lecanographa subcaesioides – MA
- Lecanora acervulata **B** – RJ (provisionally accepted)
- Lecanora achroa – TO, CE, PB, PE, AL, SE, BA, MS, ES, RJ, SP, PR, RS
- Lecanora achrooides **B** – MG
- Lecanora ahtii **B** – RJ
- Lecanora albellula – MS, SC
- Lecanora alboflavida – SC
- Lecanora argentata – BA, MT, MS, DF, MG, ES, RJ, SP, RS
- Lecanora arthothelinella – BA
- Lecanora atroflavens **B** – BA, RJ
- Lecanora blanda – MG, RJ, RS
- Lecanora brasiliana **B** – AM, MA, AL, MT, MS, MG, RJ, RS
- Lecanora casuarinophila – SE, SP, RS
- Lecanora cerradoensis – MT, MS, RS
- Lecanora chlaronella – MG, RS
- Lecanora chlarotera – MG
- Lecanora concilianda **B** – PE, AL, BA, MS, MG, RJ, SP, RS
- Lecanora concilians – AL, SE, MG, SP
- Lecanora conformata **B** – MG
- Lecanora coralloidea – RJ (provisionally accepted)
- Lecanora coronulans – CE, PE, SE, BA, MT, GO, MG, ES, RJ, SP, SC, RS
- Lecanora diamartiza **B** – MG
- Lecanora elapheia – RS
- Lecanora entypta **B** – RJ (provisionally accepted)
- Lecanora epirhoda **B** – MG
- Lecanora expallens – SE, MT, MG, SP, SC
- Lecanora farinacea – MG, RJ, RS
- Lecanora faxinensis **B** – SP (provisionally accepted)
- Lecanora feeana – MS
- Lecanora flavidofusca – GO
- Lecanora flavidomarginata – MS, GO, DF, RJ
- Lecanora flavidula – SP
- Lecanora flavocaesia **B** – PE, SE, BA
- Lecanora fluorosaxicola **B** – PE, BA
- Lecanora fluoroxylina **B** – MT, MS, GO, ES, SP, PR
- Lecanora frustulosa – AL, MT, RJ, SP, RS
- Lecanora fulvastra **B** – MG, SP, RS
- Lecanora fusca **B** – RS
- Lecanora galactiniza – CE, SE, MT, ES, RJ, RS
- Lecanora glaucodea – ES
- Lecanora glaucomodes – PE, SE, MT, MG
- Lecanora granuligerans **B** – SP (provisionally accepted)
- Lecanora helva – MA, PI, CE, RN, PB, PE, AL, SE, BA, MT, MS, GO, MG, ES, SP, SC, RS
- Lecanora hensseniae **B** – BA, RJ
- Lecanora hypocrocina – PB, PE, AL, SE, BA, MT, GO, SP, RS
- Lecanora hypofusca **B** – BA, MT, MS
- Lecanora hypopsilota **B** – MG
- Lecanora immersocalcarea **B** – MS
- Lecanora irregularicrocea **B** – RJ
- Lecanora itatiayae **B** – RJ (provisionally accepted)
- Lecanora jamesii – TO
- Lecanora kalbiana **B** – PE, AL, BA, MT, MS, ES, SP
- Lecanora leproplaca – AM, TO, MA, CE, RN, PB, PE, AL, SE, BA, MT, MS, DF, ES, RJ, PR, SC
- Lecanora leprosa **B** – CE, RN, PE, AL, SE, BA, MT, MS, GO, DF, MG, ES, RJ, SP, SC, RS
- Lecanora leptaspis – State unknown (provisionally accepted)
- Lecanora lichexanthona **B** – MA, MT, MS
- Lecanora lichexanthoxylina **B** – MS
- Lecanora livescens **B** – RJ
- Lecanora lobata **B** – RJ (provisionally accepted)
- Lecanora macrescens **B** – MG, RS
- Lecanora mesoxanthoides **B** – MG
- Lecanora minarum **B** – PR, RS
- Lecanora myriocarpa **B** – MG, ES, RJ, RS
- Lecanora myriocarpoides **B** – DF, MG
- Lecanora neohelva **B** – MG, SP
- Lecanora neomerrillii – CE, PE, AL, SE, BA, MT, MS, GO, MG, ES, RJ, SP, RS
- Lecanora neonashii – RJ
- Lecanora nigrilobulata **B** – MG
- Lecanora notatica **B** – RJ, SP
- Lecanora notatictria **B** – PB, PE, BA, SP
- Lecanora ochroleucodes **B** – SP
- Lecanora oreinoides – MA, PE, AL, BA, MS, MG, ES, RJ, SP, SC, RS
- Lecanora orosthea – MG
- Lecanora pallidachroa **B** – PE, AL
- Lecanora pallidiflava **B** – State unknown (provisionally accepted)
- Lecanora parachroa **B** – PE, SE
- Lecanora parahelva **B** – PE, SE, BA, SP
- Lecanora plumosa – PE, SE, MS, MG, ES, RJ, SC, RS
- Lecanora polytropa – MT
- Lecanora praeferenda – PE, MG, ES
- Lecanora pseudatra **B** – SP (provisionally accepted)
- Lecanora pseudistera – PE, AL, SE, BA, MT, MS, ES, RS
- Lecanora rabdota **B** – MG
- Lecanora rabdotoides **B** – BA, MG, SP
- Lecanora saepiphila **B** – AL
- Lecanora stramineoalbida – AL, BA, MT, SP
- Lecanora strobisorella **B** – MG, SP
- Lecanora subalbellina **B** – MS, MG, RJ, RS
- Lecanora subaureoides – PR
- Lecanora subcarnea – MG, PR
- Lecanora subcrenulata **B** – SE, MT, MS, ES, RJ
- Lecanora subgranulata – SC (provisionally accepted)
- Lecanora subimmergens – CE, SE, BA, MS, GO, RJ
- Lecanora subimmersa – MA, PE, AL, SE, BA, MT, MS, MG, ES, RJ, SP, RS
- Lecanora sublivida **B** – MS (provisionally accepted)
- Lecanora sulfurescens **B** – CE, PE, SE, MT, MS, MG, RJ, SP, SC, RS
- Lecanora symmicta – PE, SE, MG, RS
- Lecanora symmictella **B** – MG, SP, RS
- Lecanora thysanophora – MT, MS, ES, RS
- Lecanora tropica – AM, PA, TO, MA, CE, PB, PE, AL, SE, BA, MT, MS, GO, DF, MG, RJ, SP, SC, RS
- Lecanora umbilicatimmersa **B** – SP, SC, RS
- Lecanora vainioi **B** – PE, AL, BA, RJ, SP, SC
- Lecanora wainioana **B** – MG
- Lecanora wilsonii – MT, SC
- Lecanora wirthii – BA
- Lecanora xanthomelaniza **B** – SP (provisionally accepted)
- Lecanora xanthoplumosa – PE, MT
- Lecanora xanthoverrucosa **B** – AL, SE, BA
- Lecidea grisella – RS
- Lecidea haerjedalica – SE
- Lecidea lithophila – MG
- Lecidea meiococca – SE
- Lecidea melanococca **B** – MG
- Lecidea nylanderi – SC
- Lecidea plana – RJ
- Lecidea promiscua – MG
- Lecidea sarcogynoides – RS
- Lecidea soredioatrobrunnea – RJ
- Lecidea variegatula – MG
- Lecidella asema – MG, SC, RS
- Lecidella buelliastrum – AL, MT, SC, RS
- Lecidella carpathica – MS, ES, PR, SC, RS
- Lecidella chodati – AL, RJ, PR, SC
- Lecidella enteroleucella – PE, AL, MS, MG, ES, SP
- Lecidella fuliginea **B** – MG
- Lecidella fuscelliformis **B** – RS
- Lecidella patavina – MG
- Lecidella punctuliformis – PE, BA, MT, MS, SP, RS
- Lecidella stigmatea – MG
- Lecidella violaceofuliginea **B** – MG, RJ
- Leioderma glabrum – MG
- Leiorreuma exaltatum – PE, BA, MG, PR
- Leiorreuma patellulum – RJ
- Leiorreuma sericeum **B** – BA, MT, MS, SP
- Lepidocollema brisbanense – MG, SP, SC
- Lepidocollema carassense **B** – MG
- Lepidocollema imbricatulum **B** – ES, SP, SC
- Lepidocollema marianum – RJ, SP, RS
- Lepidocollema stylophorum **B** – AL, ES, SP, SC
- Lepidostroma winklerianum – AL
- Lepra commutata – MS, MG, SC, RS
- Lepra excludens – MG
- Lepra lacerans – SP
- Lepra lichexanthonorstictica **B** – SC
- Lepra lichexanthoverrucosa – BA, MT, RJ
- Lepra muricata – CE, MG
- Lepra ornatula **B** – RJ
- Lepra subventosa **B** – MA, AL, SE, BA, MT, MG, RJ, SP, PR, SC, RS
- Lepra superans **B** – MT, MS, SP, RS
- Lepra tropica – AM, PA, MA, PE, AL, SE, BA, MT, MS, RJ, SP, PR, SC, RS
- Lepra variolosa – MG, RJ
- Lepra ventosa **B** – CE, PE, AL, SE, MG, SC, RS
- Lepra xantholeucoides **B** – MG
- Lepraria albicans – RS
- Lepraria arbuscula – BA, MG, SP, PR
- Lepraria brasiliensis **B** – MG, RS
- Lepraria finkii – PE, MS, MG, SP
- Lepraria membranacea – MG
- Lepraria multiacida **B** – MG
- Lepraria neglecta – MG
- Lepraria pallida – MS, MG, SP, RS
- Lepraria sipmaniana – PE, BA, MS, MG, ES, RJ, SP, SC, RS
- Leprocollema americanum **B** – MS, RJ
- Leprocollema nova-caledonianum – SE
- Leptogidium dendriscum – AL, MT, MG, SP, PR, SC, RS
- Leptogium adpressum **B** – PB, SC
- Leptogium atlanticum **B** – AL, SP, SC, RS
- Leptogium austroamericanum **B** – AC, PA, TO, AL, SE, BA, MT, MS, MG, ES, RJ, SP, PR, SC, RS
- Leptogium azureum – AM, PA, MT, MG, RJ, SP, SC, RS
- Leptogium brebissonii – MT, MS, RS
- Leptogium caespitosum – SP
- Leptogium chloromelum – MT, MS, RS
- Leptogium cochleatum – AP, AL, MS, MG, ES, SP, SC, RS
- Leptogium coralloideum – AM, RO, PE, AL, SE, MT, MS, MG, RJ, PR, RS
- Leptogium corrugatulum – RJ
- Leptogium corticola – AC, AM, AP, CE, AL, SE, BA, MS, ES, SP, PR, SC, RS
- Leptogium cyanescens – AC, AM, CE, PE, AL, SE, BA, MT, MS, MG, ES, RJ, SP, PR, RS
- Leptogium cyanizum – MS
- Leptogium daedaleum – MT
- Leptogium decipiens – SP
- Leptogium denticulatum – AL, BA, MT, MG, SP, RS
- Leptogium diaphanum – MS, SP, SC, RS
- Leptogium dimorphum **B** – SP
- Leptogium exaratum **B** – RS
- Leptogium foveolatum – RJ, SP, SC
- Leptogium fusisporum – MS, SP
- Leptogium hibernicum – MG, RS
- Leptogium hondae **B** – MS
- Leptogium inflexum – MG, SC
- Leptogium involutum **B** – MG, RS
- Leptogium isidiosellum – PA, AP, AL, SE, BA, MT, MS, GO, MG, ES, SP, PR, SC, RS
- Leptogium javanicum – ES, RJ, SP, SC, RS
- Leptogium kalbii **B** – SP
- Leptogium laceroides – SP
- Leptogium lafayetteanum **B** – MG
- Leptogium leptophyllinum – RJ
- Leptogium mantiqueirense **B** – MG, SP
- Leptogium marginatum – SP
- Leptogium marginellum – PA, PE, AL, SE, MT, MS, DF, MG, ES, RJ, SP, PR, SC, RS
- Leptogium mattogrossense **B** – MT
- Leptogium megapotamicum **B** – RS
- Leptogium microcarpum **B** – MS
- Leptogium milligranum – MT, MS, SP, RS
- Leptogium moluccanum – AM, PE, BA, MT, MG, RJ, SP, SC, RS
- Leptogium olivaceum – PE, AL, MG, RJ, SC
- Leptogium pachycheilum **B** – MG
- Leptogium phyllocarpum – AC, RO, BA, MT, MS, DF, MG, ES, RJ, SP, PR, SC, RS
- Leptogium pichneum – RS
- Leptogium propaguliferum **B** – MG
- Leptogium puiggarii **B** – RJ, SP, RS
- Leptogium punctulatum – MG, RJ
- Leptogium quilombensis **B** – MS
- Leptogium reticulatum – AL, BA, RJ, SP
- Leptogium schiffneri – SP
- Leptogium sessile – SP, RS
- Leptogium sphinctrinum – MG
- Leptogium stipitatum – PR
- Leptogium subbullatum **B** – RJ
- Leptogium subjuressianum **B** – RS
- Leptogium tuckermanii – MS, PR, RS
- Leptogium ulvaceum – MT, SP, RS
- Leptogium vesiculosum – MT, MG, SC, RS
- Letrouitia aureola – SP
- Letrouitia domingensis – AC, PE, AL, SE, BA, MT, MS, MG, ES, RJ, SP, PR, SC, RS
- Letrouitia flavidula – MT, SC
- Letrouitia flavocrocea – TO, MS, RJ
- Letrouitia leprolyta – PE, SE, BA, MT
- Letrouitia subvulpina – AC, RO, TO, PE, AL, MT, GO
- Letrouitia transgressa **B** – RS
- Letrouitia vulpina – AC, RO, PA, AP, TO, RN, PE, AL, BA, MT, MS, SP
- Leucodecton aurantiacum **B** – AM
- Leucodecton compunctellum – PB, SE, BA
- Leucodecton compunctum – AM
- Leucodecton desquamescens – MS
- Leucodecton expallescens – AM, PB
- Leucodecton fissurinum – SE, MT
- Leucodecton glaucescens – RR, PA, MT, MS
- Leucodecton isidiatum **B** – AP
- Leucodecton occultum **B** – AM, CE, RN, PB, PE, AL, SE, BA, MT, MS, RJ
- Leucodecton oxysporum **B** – AM, MT
- Leucodecton sordidescens **B** – PB, SE, RJ
- Leucodecton subcompunctum – AM, SE, MT
- Leucodecton uatumense – AM
- Lichinella applanata **B** – MT
- Lichinella iodopulchra – SE
- Lithocalla ecorticata – RS
- Lithogyalideopsis aterrima – MG, SC
- Lithothelium cubanum – MS
- Lithothelium decumbens – MT
- Lithothelium grossum – MS
- Lithothelium illotum – PE, SE, SP, RS
- Lithothelium immersum **B** – AM, RO
- Lithothelium obtectum – AC, AM, AP, RN, PB, PE, SE, MT, MS, DF
- Lithothelium paraguayense – MS, SC
- Lobariella crenulata – MG, RJ, SP, RS
- Lobariella exornata – MG, ES, RS
- Lobariella faxinensis **B** – MG, SP
- Lobariella pallida – RJ
- Lobariella stenroosiae **B** – MG, RJ
- Lobariella subexornata – MG, RJ, SC
- Loflammia epiphylla – AM, RO, PE, SP, RS
- Loflammia gabrielis **B** – AM, PE
- Loflammiopsis brasiliensis **B** – AM
- Logilvia gilva **B** – PE, RJ, SP, PR, SC, RS
- Lopadium hepaticicola – BA
- Lopadium subcoralloideum **B** – RJ
- Lopezaria versicolor – PE, BA, MT, DF, MG, ES, RJ, SP, SC, RS
- Lyromma confusum – AM, RO, MS
- Lyromma dolichobellum **B** – RR, PA, MA
- Lyromma nectandrae **B** – AM, PE, SE, RJ
- Lyromma ornatum **B** – RO, PE, SP
- Lyromma palmae **B** – AM, MA, MS

== M ==
- Macroconstrictolumina lyrata – PE, SE, MS, SP
- Macroconstrictolumina majuscula – CE, SE, MS
- Macroconstrictolumina malaccitula – MA, AL
- Macroconstrictolumina megalateralis **B** – AC, MT, MS
- Macroconstrictolumina porospora – ES
- Malmidea allobakeri **B** – PE, AL, SE, BA
- Malmidea amazonica **B** – AM, RO, PA, MT, GO, SC
- Malmidea atlantica **B** – SE
- Malmidea atlanticoides **B** – SE
- Malmidea aurigera – PB, MT, GO, MG
- Malmidea badimioides – PB, PE, AL, SE
- Malmidea bakeri – AM, AL, MT
- Malmidea ceylanica – AC, RO, SE
- Malmidea cineracea – RO
- Malmidea cinereonigrella – SE
- Malmidea coralliformis – AM, AP
- Malmidea corallophora – RS
- Malmidea densisidiata **B** – RO, MT
- Malmidea fellhaneroides – MT, MS
- Malmidea fulva **B** – RO, PE, BA, MG, SP
- Malmidea furfurosa – AM, RO, PA, RN, PB, PE, SE, MS, SC
- Malmidea fuscella **B** – RO, CE, PB, PE, AL, SE, BA, MS, DF, SP, PR, SC, RS
- Malmidea granifera – AM, RO, AP, CE, RN, PB, PE, AL, SE, BA, MT, MS, RJ
- Malmidea gyalectoides – RO, PB, PE, AL, SE, MS, MG, RS
- Malmidea hypomela – PE, AL, MG, ES, RJ, SP, PR, RS
- Malmidea incrassata – AL, RJ, SP, SC
- Malmidea isidiifera **B** – RJ
- Malmidea leptoloma **B** – AC, AM, RO, PA, CE, PB, PE, AL, SE, MT, MS, RJ, SP, RS
- Malmidea leucogranifera **B** – PA, AP
- Malmidea leucopiperis **B** – PE, SE, RJ, SP
- Malmidea nigra **B** – AM, MT
- Malmidea nigromarginata – BA, RJ, SP, RS
- Malmidea pallens **B** – SP
- Malmidea pallidoatlantica **B** – SE, ES
- Malmidea papillosa – AM, AP, TO, AL, BA
- Malmidea perisidiata **B** – AC, AL, RS
- Malmidea perplexa – SP
- Malmidea piae – AM
- Malmidea piperina – AC, AM, RO, PA, AP, TO, AL, BA, MT, MS
- Malmidea piperis – AC, AM, PA, CE, RN, PB, PE, AL, SE, BA, MT, MS, MG, ES, RJ, SP, PR, SC, RS
- Malmidea polisensis – AP
- Malmidea polycampia – AC, AM, RO, AP, TO, CE, PE, AL, BA, MT, MS, ES, SP, PR, SC, RS
- Malmidea psychotrioides – AM, RO, PA, AP, TO, MA, RN, PB, PE, AL, SE, BA, MT, MS, SP
- Malmidea puiggarii **B** – SP
- Malmidea rhodopisoides **B** – SP
- Malmidea rhodopsis – State unknown
- Malmidea subatlantica **B** – RO, PB, AL, BA
- Malmidea subaurigera – AC
- Malmidea sulphureosorediata **B** – CE, PE, AL, SE, BA, ES, SP
- Malmidea trailiana **B** – AM, RO, PA
- Malmidea tratiana – AM, PA, AP
- Malmidea vinosa **B** – AC, AM, PA, AP, TO, CE, RN, PB, PE, AL, SE, BA, MT, MS, GO, DF, MG, ES, RJ, SP, PR, SC, RS
- Malmidea volcaniana – PE
- Malmographina plicosa – AC, AM, RO, MA, SE, BA, MT
- Mangoldia lecideicarpa **B** – SP
- Mangoldia thallolomoides **B** – AP
- Marcelaria purpurina **B** – AM, PA, TO, MA, MT, MS
- Maronea apiahica **B** – MG, SP, RS (provisionally accepted)
- Maronea horizoides **B** – MT (provisionally accepted)
- Maronea malmei **B** – MT (provisionally accepted)
- Maronea rubiginosa **B** – MT, MG, SP (provisionally accepted)
- Maronora cyanosora **B** – BA, MT, MS, SP, RS
- Mazaediothecium serendipiticum **B** – MS
- Mazaediothecium uniseptatum – ES
- Mazosia bambusae – AM, RO, PE, MT, MG, SP
- Mazosia carnea – AM, AP, MA, RN, PB, PE, AL, SE, BA, MG, RJ, SP, SC
- Mazosia conica – PE, SP
- Mazosia dispersa – AM, RO, PA, PB, PE, SE, BA, MT, MG, SP, SC
- Mazosia endonigra **B** – MA, PI, CE, PE, AL, BA, MT
- Mazosia flavida **B** – MT
- Mazosia longispora – AM, PA, PE
- Mazosia melanophthalma **B** – AC, AM, RO, PA, AP, PB, PE, AL, SE, BA, MT, MS, MG, RJ, SP, SC, RS
- Mazosia paupercula **B** – AM, PA, PE, RJ, SP, SC, RS
- Mazosia phyllosema – AC, AM, RO, PA, AP, PB, PE, AL, SE, BA, MT, MS, MG, ES, RJ, SP, SC, RS
- Mazosia pilosa **B** – AC, AM, RO, PA, PE, AL, SE, BA, MT
- Mazosia praemorsa **B** – AM, PA, PE, MT, SP
- Mazosia pseudobambusae **B** – AM, RO, PA, PE, MT, SP
- Mazosia rotula **B** – AC, AM, RO, PA, PB, PE, AL, SE, BA, MT, MS, MG, ES, RJ, SP, PR, SC, RS
- Mazosia rubropunctata **B** – AC, AM, RO, PA, PE, AL, BA, MT, SP
- Mazosia sorediifera – BA
- Mazosia tenuissima – AM, RO, PB, MT
- Mazosia tumidula **B** – AC, AM, RO, RR, PA, PE, BA, MT, SC, RS
- Mazosia viridescens – AC, MA, PB, AL, SE, BA
- Megalaria bengalensis – AC, MA, CE, AL, SE, BA, MT, RJ
- Megalospora admixta – RJ
- Megalospora pachycheila – AL, ES, RJ, SP, RS
- Megalospora sulphurata – AL, SE, MT, MG, ES, RJ, SP, PR, SC, RS
- Megalospora tuberculosa – AM, PA, AL, SE, BA, MT, MS, DF, MG, ES, RJ, SP, PR, SC, RS
- Megalotremis flavovulcana – AL, SE
- Megalotremis nemorosa – AP
- Megalotremis pustulata – MT, DF
- Megalotremis verrucosa – AP, SE
- Melanophloea pacifica – AL
- Melanotrema astrolucens – AM, PA
- Melanotrema columellatum – SP
- Melanotrema endomelaenum – BA
- Melanotrema lirelliforme – AM, MT, SP
- Melanotrema lynceodes – AP
- Melanotrema meiospermum – AP, PB, SE, MG, SP
- Melanotrema platystomum – AM, RR, AP, PB, PE, AL, SE, BA, MT, MS, MG, ES, SP
- Melaspilea arthoniodes – AC, RJ
- Melaspilea brasiliensis **B** – RJ
- Melaspilea conglomerans **B** – SC
- Melaspilea diffracta – RN, RJ
- Melaspilea gemella **B** – BA
- Melaspilea heterocarpa **B** – AM
- Melaspilea hysteriospora **B** – AM
- Melaspilea interalbicans – AM, BA, RJ
- Melaspilea maculosa – AM
- Melaspilea microspilota – AC, RO, SP
- Melaspileopsis diplasiospora – PE, MG, SC
- Metamelanea caesiella – MS
- Micarea adnata – AM
- Micarea americana **B** – MS, RS
- Micarea bacillospora **B** – AM, RO, PA, PE, AL, SE
- Micarea botryoides – AM, SC
- Micarea corallothallina **B** – AM, PA, AP, BA, MT, MG
- Micarea denigrata – AM, SC
- Micarea isidiothallina **B** – AM, RO, PA, AP, AL, SE, BA, MG, SC
- Micarea leprosula – RJ, PR
- Micarea lignaria – RJ, SP, SC
- Micarea lithinella – AM, ES
- Micarea melaena – RO, MA
- Micarea micrococca – RO, PA, MG, RJ
- Micarea misella – MG, ES, SC
- Micarea nigrata **B** – MG, SP
- Micarea peliocarpa – AM, AP, MG, PR
- Micarea prasina – AM, AP, MG, SP, SC, RS
- Micarea pycnidiophora – PE, SE
- Micarea squamulosa **B** – PE, SE, BA, MT, MS
- Micarea stipitata – AM, PE, SE, SC
- Micarea subgranulans **B** – MG
- Micarea subternaria **B** – MG
- Micarea termitophila **B** – RO, SE, BA
- Micarea viridileprosa – AP
- Microtheliopsis uleana **B** – AC, AM, RO, PA, PE, AL, BA, MT, MS, ES, RJ, SP, PR, RS
- Microtheliopsis uniseptata – PB
- Microxyphiomyces lancicarpus **B** – PB, PE, RJ, SP
- Microxyphiomyces santessonianus **B** – AM
- Microxyphiomyces similis – RO, AP, ES
- Microxyphiomyces vainioi – AM, RO, PB, PE, AL, SE, BA, RJ, SP, PR
- Milospium graphideorum – AM
- Monerolechia badia – CE, MS
- Monocalenia monospora – PE, SE, MS, RS
- Multisporidea conidiophora **B** – AM, MT
- Mycobilimbia diplotypa **B** – MG
- Mycocalicium albonigrum – BA, MT, MS, GO, MG, SP
- Mycocalicium americanum – MS, RS
- Mycocalicium enterographicola **B** – SE, MS
- Mycoporum acervatum – AL, MT, MS, MG
- Mycoporum brasilianum **B** – AM
- Mycoporum compositum – AM, TO, CE, PE, AL, SE, BA, MT, MS, GO, MG, ES, RJ, PR
- Mycoporum eschweileri **B** – AM, RO, PA, MA, PB, PE, AL, SE, BA, MS, MG, SP, SC, RS
- Mycoporum granulatum **B** – SP
- Mycoporum lacteum – AM, PE, AL, SE, MS, MG, RJ, SP, SC
- Mycoporum pycnocarpoides – PE, BA
- Mycoporum sparsellum – AP, RN, SE, BA, MS, RJ, PR
- Myelochroa aurulenta – MS, MG, ES, SP, SC, RS
- Myelochroa immiscens – MS
- Myelochroa supraflava **B** – RS
- Myeloconis fecunda – AM, PA, AP, MG
- Myeloconis guyanensis – AC, AM, RO, RR, PA, PE, SE, BA, ES
- Myeloconis parva – AM, RO
- Myriochapsa negativa **B** – AM
- Myriochapsa psoromica **B** – RO
- Myriochapsa triseptata **B** – RO
- Myriospora rufescens – RJ, SP
- Myriostigma filicinum – AC, AM, RO, PA, CE, BA, MT
- Myriostigma miniatum – AC, AM, TO, AL, SE, BA, MS, SP
- Myriostigma minisorediatum **B** – RO, TO
- Myriostigma subcandidum **B** – AM, PA, PE, AL, SE, MT, MG
- Myriostigma xanthominiatum **B** – AM, MT, GO, SP, PR
- Myriostigma xanthonicum **B** – BA, MS
- Myriotrema aggregans – BA
- Myriotrema album – AM, RO, PE, MT, MG, RJ, SP
- Myriotrema arimense – BA
- Myriotrema clandestinoides – PB
- Myriotrema clandestinum – AM, RO, MT, SP
- Myriotrema concretum – MG, RJ, SP
- Myriotrema congestum – AL
- Myriotrema defectofrondosum **B** – TO, MG, SP
- Myriotrema foliaceum **B** – AC, RO, MG
- Myriotrema frondosolucens – AM, BA
- Myriotrema frondosum – MA, BA, MT, RS
- Myriotrema glauculum – AC, RR, PA, BA, MT
- Myriotrema hartii – AM, AL, SE
- Myriotrema immersum – PA
- Myriotrema inspersosticticum **B** – AP
- Myriotrema inspersum **B** – RO
- Myriotrema leucohymenium **B** – SP
- Myriotrema microporum – AM, AL, SE, RJ
- Myriotrema multicavum – SP
- Myriotrema myrioporoides – AM, AL, SE, BA, MG, ES, SP
- Myriotrema myrioporum – AM, MT, MS, RJ, SP
- Myriotrema myriotremoides – MG
- Myriotrema neofrondosum – AC, AM, RO, PA, SE, BA, MT, PR
- Myriotrema olivaceum – AM, RO, AP, PE, SE, RJ, SP
- Myriotrema psormuriforme **B** – AM
- Myriotrema reticulatum **B** – AP
- Myriotrema robertianum **B** – SP
- Myriotrema roseum **B** – RO, AP
- Myriotrema sphinctrinellum – MG
- Myriotrema subclandestinum **B** – AM, RO, PA, MA, SE, MT
- Myriotrema subconforme – AM, AP, SE, SC
- Myriotrema subzollingeri **B** – RJ
- Myriotrema uniseptataum – AC
- Myriotrema viride – AC, AM, BA
- Myriotrema viridialbum **B** – AM, BA, RJ
- Myriotrema xanthonicum **B** – AP

== N ==
- Nadvornikia hawaiensis – AM, AL, MT, MG
- Naetrocymbe quassiicola – MS
- Naetrocymbe saxicola – MG
- Neoprotoparmelia brasilisidiata **B** – AC, TO, MA, PE, AL, SE, BA, MT, MS, MG, RJ, SC, RS
- Neoprotoparmelia camptotheca – PB, PE, RJ, RS
- Neoprotoparmelia capitata – CE, PE, BA, MS, GO, MG, ES, SP, RS
- Neoprotoparmelia multifera – CE, PE, SE, BA, MT, MS, DF, MG, RJ, SP, SC, RS
- Neoprotoparmelia nigra **B** – SE, MG, ES, RS
- Neoprotoparmelia paramultifera **B** – PE, MT
- Neoprotoparmelia plurisporibadia **B** – SC, RS
- Neoprotoparmelia pseudomultifera **B** – PE, GO, DF, MG, ES, SP
- Neoprotoparmelia purpurea **B** – PB, PE, ES
- Neoprotoparmelia saxicola **B** – PE, BA, MT, MG, RJ, SP, PR
- Neoprotoparmelia sexdecimspora **B** – PE, MT, MS, GO
- Neosergipea aurata **B** – SE
- Neosergipea bicolor **B** – BA, SC
- Neosergipea hyphosa **B** – RO, AP
- Neosergipea rubrosorediata **B** – RO, MS
- Neosergipea septoconidiata **B** – AC, AM, PA, AP, AL, BA, MT
- Nigrovothelium inspersotropicum – PE, AL, BA, MT, MS, GO, DF, ES, SP
- Nigrovothelium tropicum – AM, RO, PA, AP, MA, CE, PB, PE, AL, SE, BA, MT, MS, MG, ES, RJ, SP, SC
- Nitidochapsa aggregata – PA, CE, PE, AL, SE, MG
- Nitidochapsa leprieurii – AC, PE, SE, BA, SP, RS
- Normandina pulchella – AL, SE, BA, MT, DF, MG, ES, RJ, SP, PR, SC, RS
- Nyungwea anguinella – AP, TO, MA, PI, CE, RN, PB, PE, AL, SE, MS, MG, SP, SC
- Nyungwea pycnidiata **B** – AP, BA, MT

== O ==
- Ocellularia albula – MG, RJ, SP
- Ocellularia allospora – SE, BA
- Ocellularia antillensis – AM, BA, MT
- Ocellularia ascidioidea – AM, PA, AP, SE, ES
- Ocellularia auberianoides – AC, AL, SE, BA, MT, MS, ES, RJ, SP, PR
- Ocellularia aurulenta – AM, BA
- Ocellularia bahiana **B** – AM, MA, RN, AL, SE, BA, SP
- Ocellularia barroensis – AM, RO, AP, BA, MT
- Ocellularia boarucensis – RO, SP
- Ocellularia brasiliensis **B** – RO, MG
- Ocellularia buckii – AM, BA
- Ocellularia bullata – PA
- Ocellularia calvescens – AC, RO
- Ocellularia carassensis **B** – AL, BA, MG, SP
- Ocellularia cavata – AC, AM, RO, PA, CE, PB, PE, SE, BA, MT, MG, ES, RJ, SP, PR, SC
- Ocellularia chiriquensis – MG, SP
- Ocellularia chonestoma **B** – PA, TO, SE
- Ocellularia cicra – AM, PA, AP
- Ocellularia cipoensis **B** – SE
- Ocellularia comparabilis – SE
- Ocellularia conformalis **B** – PA
- Ocellularia conformis – RJ, SP
- Ocellularia coronatoverrucosa **B** – AM
- Ocellularia crocea – AM, PB, PE, SE, BA
- Ocellularia croceoisidiata – RO, MG
- Ocellularia cryptica – MT
- Ocellularia cryptotrema – SP
- Ocellularia daniana – MT
- Ocellularia decolorata – PA, AP, SE
- Ocellularia diminuta **B** – RO
- Ocellularia dolichotata – AC, AM, RO, SE, BA, MT, SP, SC
- Ocellularia domingensis – PE, RJ, SP
- Ocellularia ecorticata – BA
- Ocellularia endocrocea **B** – SP
- Ocellularia eumorpha – SP
- Ocellularia excavata – AM
- Ocellularia exigua **B** – AM, MT, SP
- Ocellularia fecunda – AP, PE, MG, PR
- Ocellularia fenestrata – AC
- Ocellularia flaviradiata **B** – AM
- Ocellularia flavoperforata – RO
- Ocellularia flavostroma **B** – RO
- Ocellularia fuscescens **B** – PE, RJ, SP
- Ocellularia fuscolichexanthonica **B** – AM
- Ocellularia fuscosubmuriformis **B** – BA
- Ocellularia garoana – RO, SE, MS, SP
- Ocellularia gibberulosa **B** – SP
- Ocellularia gracilis **B** – PE, BA, SP
- Ocellularia griseosorediata **B** – AM
- Ocellularia halei **B** – RO
- Ocellularia immersocarpa **B** – RO
- Ocellularia inspersata – AM
- Ocellularia inspersipallens – RO
- Ocellularia inspersomuriformis **B** – AM
- Ocellularia inspersula **B** – AM, RO, AL, BA
- Ocellularia inspersulascens **B** – RO
- Ocellularia interposita – AC, BA, PR
- Ocellularia inturgescens – SP
- Ocellularia jutaratiae – AP, SP
- Ocellularia lacerata **B** – RO, PA
- Ocellularia laeviuscula – SE
- Ocellularia laeviusculoides – AM, PA, PE, MT, SP
- Ocellularia landronii – AC, AM, RO, PA, AL, SE, MS
- Ocellularia lathraea – SC
- Ocellularia leucotrema – MG, SP
- Ocellularia lichexanthocavata **B** – AM
- Ocellularia lithophila **B** – MT
- Ocellularia margaritacea **B** – RO
- Ocellularia marmorata – AC, AM
- Ocellularia mauritiana – AM, AP, PE, SE, BA, PR
- Ocellularia maxima – PE
- Ocellularia melanostoma **B** – RJ, SP
- Ocellularia microschizidiata **B** – MA
- Ocellularia minarum **B** – MG
- Ocellularia minutula – RO, PE, BA
- Ocellularia myriotrema **B** – RO
- Ocellularia natashae – AM, PA
- Ocellularia norsorediata **B** – PA
- Ocellularia obturascens – PB, SE
- Ocellularia ornata **B** – RO, PA
- Ocellularia pallidocolumellata **B** – AM
- Ocellularia papillata – AC, RO, RN, PE, AL, SE, BA, MT, MS, MG
- Ocellularia papillifera – PA
- Ocellularia parvidisca – AM, AP
- Ocellularia pedicellata **B** – AM
- Ocellularia percolumellata – AC, AM, RO, PA, PE, BA, MT, MS, SC
- Ocellularia perforata **B** – AC, AM, RO, SE, BA, MG, ES, SP
- Ocellularia pertusella **B** – TO
- Ocellularia piperis **B** – PE, AL, SE, MG, SP
- Ocellularia pluripora – AM, MS
- Ocellularia pluriporoides – AM, MT
- Ocellularia polydisca **B** – AC, AM, RO, PA, MT, GO, DF
- Ocellularia postposita – MG, RJ, SP
- Ocellularia praestans **B** – AC, PE, AL, SE, BA, ES, RJ, SP
- Ocellularia praestantoides – AP
- Ocellularia protocetrarica – AM, AP
- Ocellularia protoinspersa – MT
- Ocellularia pseudochapsa **B** – AM, RO
- Ocellularia pseudocyphellata **B** – AM
- Ocellularia pseudopapillata – RO, BA
- Ocellularia pseudopyrenuloides – AM, PB
- Ocellularia pseudostromatica **B** – RO
- Ocellularia psorbarroensis – AC, RO, PA, SE
- Ocellularia psorinspersa **B** – SE
- Ocellularia psorirregularis **B** – BA
- Ocellularia psorsorediata **B** – AM
- Ocellularia pulverulenta – AC, AM, AP, TO, AL, BA, MT, MS, SP
- Ocellularia punctulata **B** – PA, AP
- Ocellularia referta – AM, PA, AP, SE, MT
- Ocellularia rhabdospora – RJ
- Ocellularia rhodostroma – AM, AP
- Ocellularia ripleyi – MG
- Ocellularia rondoniana **B** – AM, RO, PB, PE, AL, BA
- Ocellularia roseoisidiata **B** – AM
- Ocellularia rubropolydiscus **B** – AM, RO
- Ocellularia rudior **B** – SE
- Ocellularia rugosothallina – AC, AM
- Ocellularia sanfordiana – RJ, SP
- Ocellularia soralifera **B** – AM
- Ocellularia soredica **B** – AM
- Ocellularia sorediigera **B** – BA
- Ocellularia sorediopseudochapsa **B** – AM, RO
- Ocellularia sosma **B** – SE
- Ocellularia stictans – RJ, SP
- Ocellularia submordenii – SE, BA
- Ocellularia subnatashae **B** – MT
- Ocellularia subperforata – AC, AM, RO, PA
- Ocellularia subpyrenuloides – RO, MT
- Ocellularia suprafricana **B** – MG
- Ocellularia terebrata – AM, RO, PA, PE, SE, MT, MG, RJ, SP, PR, RS
- Ocellularia thryptica – AC, BA, MT, MS
- Ocellularia triglyphica – SP
- Ocellularia umbilicata – MT
- Ocellularia uniseptatoides **B** – SE
- Ocellularia urceolaris – AP
- Ocellularia usnicolor – AM, RO, PE, AL, SP
- Ocellularia verruciinspersa **B** – RO
- Ocellularia violacea – AC, MA, AL, BA, MT
- Ocellularia viridipallens – AC, AM, RO, AP, TO, PB, PE, SE
- Ocellularia vulcanica **B** – AP
- Ocellularia wirthiotremoides **B** – AP
- Ocellularia xantholeuca – RO
- Ocellularia xanthostroma – PE
- Ocellularia xanthostromiza – AM, RO
- Ochrolechia africana – PA, PE, AL, SE, BA, MT, GO, DF, MG, ES, RJ, SC, RS
- Ochrolechia isidiata **B** – MT, MS, SP
- Ochrolechia osorioana – SC, RS
- Ochrolechia subpallescens – MS, RS
- Opegrapha agelaea – BA, RS
- Opegrapha agelaeotera – SE
- Opegrapha aperiens **B** – PB, PE, AL, SE, MT, MS, MG, RJ, RS
- Opegrapha arengae – PE, AL, SE
- Opegrapha arthrospora **B** – MG, RJ
- Opegrapha astraea – AL, SE, BA, MT, MS, DF, SP, SC, RS
- Opegrapha atratula **B** – PE, AL, SE, MT, SP, RS
- Opegrapha atrorufescens **B** – MG
- Opegrapha atroviridis **B** – RJ
- Opegrapha aurantiaca – PE, SE
- Opegrapha brachycarpa – SE, RJ, SP
- Opegrapha candida – PE
- Opegrapha chionoplaca **B** – MA, MS
- Opegrapha chlorographoides **B** – RJ
- Opegrapha cinereovirens **B** – RJ
- Opegrapha contracta **B** – AM, RN, PB, PE, AL, SE, BA, MG, RJ
- Opegrapha corumbensis **B** – MS
- Opegrapha curvula **B** – BA, MT, RJ, SP, RS
- Opegrapha cylindrica – AC, AM, RO, AP, TO, MA, CE, RN, PB, PE, AL, SE, BA, MT, MS, MG, ES, RJ, SP
- Opegrapha dekeselii – RO
- Opegrapha dicarpigera **B** – MT
- Opegrapha duckei **B** – AM
- Opegrapha fuscothallina – MT
- Opegrapha fuscula **B** – RS
- Opegrapha heliobravoa – MS
- Opegrapha inaequalis – RJ
- Opegrapha lambinonii – AM, PA
- Opegrapha linguata **B** – MT, RS
- Opegrapha lithyrga – SC
- Opegrapha lithyrgiza **B** – PE, MT, MG, RJ, SC
- Opegrapha malmei – AM
- Opegrapha melanogramma **B** – MT, RJ, RS
- Opegrapha microsperma **B** – SC
- Opegrapha millegrana **B** – PE, MT
- Opegrapha multiseptata **B** – AM, TO, BA, MS, SP, RS
- Opegrapha obscurata **B** – RS
- Opegrapha ochroplaca **B** – MS
- Opegrapha prolificans **B** – MS
- Opegrapha quinqueseptata **B** – MG
- Opegrapha quintana **B** – PE, SE, RS
- Opegrapha ramisorediata **B** – AM, AP, BA, MT, MS, RS
- Opegrapha regnellii **B** – AP, MT, RS
- Opegrapha riograndensis **B** – TO, SE, RS
- Opegrapha rionegrensis **B** – SE, RS
- Opegrapha rissoensis – MS
- Opegrapha rufidula **B** – RJ
- Opegrapha serusiauxii – AM, RO
- Opegrapha subdictyospora **B** – CE, PE, SE, BA, ES, RS
- Opegrapha subrimulosa – PA, AP, RS
- Opegrapha subvulgata – BA
- Opegrapha tartarea **B** – BA
- Opegrapha trilocularis **B** – AM, AP, SP
- Opegrapha urosperma – AC, AM, RO, AP, PE, AL, SE, BA, MT, RJ, SC
- Opegrapha vegae – AM, MT
- Opegrapha vestita **B** – SP, SC
- Opegrapha viridula **B** – RS
- Opegrapha vulgata – PA
- Opegrapha xanthonica **B** – SC
- Orcularia insperata – CE, MS, MG, SP, RS
- Orcularia placodiomorpha **B** – MS, RJ, SP, RS
- Oropogon bicolor – RJ
- Orphniospora atrata – MT

== P ==
- Pachnolepia longipseudisidiata **B** – BA
- Pallidogramme chapadana **B** – AM, TO, MA, MT, MS, GO
- Pallidogramme chlorocarpoides – AM, AL, SE
- Pallidogramme chrysenteron – PB, PE, SE, BA, MG, RJ, SP, PR, SC, RS
- Pannaria coeruleonigricans – SP
- Pannaria lurida – SE, SP
- Pannaria malmei **B** – MG, RJ, SP, SC, RS
- Pannaria mosenii **B** – RJ, SP, SC
- Papilionovela albothallina – AC, SE, MT
- Parallopsora labriformis – AC, AM, RO, BA, MT, MG
- Parallopsora leucophyllina – AC, AM, RO, AL, MT, MS
- Paraporpidia neotropica **B** – SE
- Parmeliella conopleioides **B** – MG, PR, SC
- Parmeliella nigrata – AM, MG
- Parmeliella nigrocincta – PA, PE, AL, MG, ES, RJ, SP, SC, RS
- Parmeliella pannosa – MG, PR
- Parmelinella amazonica **B** – AM, RO, PA, AP, TO, MA, PE, SE, MT, MS, GO, DF, MG, ES, SP, PR
- Parmelinella cinerascens **B** – RO, TO, PE, SE, BA, MG, SP, RS
- Parmelinella lindmanii **B** – MS, SP, PR, RS
- Parmelinella mutata **B** – GO, MG, RJ, SP, SC
- Parmelinella salacinifera – PA, TO, MA, CE, PE, MT, MG, SP, PR, SC, RS
- Parmelinella versiformis – DF, MG, RJ, SP, PR, SC
- Parmelinella wallichiana – MA, BA, DF, SP, PR, SC, RS
- Parmotrema aberrans **B** – PE, MT, MG, RJ, SP, RS
- Parmotrema abnuens **B** – PA, MG, SP, SC, RS
- Parmotrema acanthifolium **B** – MG, RJ
- Parmotrema affluens – PA, MA, MT
- Parmotrema alectoronicum **B** – MG
- Parmotrema alidactylatum – RS
- Parmotrema amaniense – MG, SP, PR, RS
- Parmotrema anchietanum **B** – SP, PR, SC
- Parmotrema andinum – PE, MT, MG
- Parmotrema appendiculatum – MT
- Parmotrema applanatum **B** – SP
- Parmotrema araucariarum **B** – SP, PR
- Parmotrema argentinum – CE, MT, MS, MG, RJ, SP, PR, SC, RS
- Parmotrema asperum **B** – GO, SP
- Parmotrema aurantiacoparvum – TO, MG, SP, PR, SC
- Parmotrema austromaculatum **B** – RS
- Parmotrema austrosinense – PE, SE, MS, MG, SP, PR, RS
- Parmotrema bangii – ES, SP, RS
- Parmotrema bifidum **B** – MT
- Parmotrema blanchetianum **B** – BA, MT, MG
- Parmotrema brasiliense **B** – MG
- Parmotrema breviciliatum – MT, GO
- Parmotrema cachimboense **B** – PA
- Parmotrema catarinae **B** – ES, SP, PR, SC, RS
- Parmotrema cetratum – BA, MT, MS, MG, ES, RJ, SP, PR, SC, RS
- Parmotrema ciliiferum **B** – PA, BA, MT, SP
- Parmotrema clavuliferum – PE, AL, SE, BA, MT, MS, GO, MG, ES, RJ, SP, PR, SC, RS
- Parmotrema clercianum **B** – MS
- Parmotrema commensuratum – PR, RS
- Parmotrema concurrens **B** – PE
- Parmotrema conferendum – MG, PR, SC, RS
- Parmotrema conformatum **B** – MT, MG, ES, SP, SC, RS
- Parmotrema confusum **B** – MT, MS
- Parmotrema conidioarcuatum **B** – SP
- Parmotrema conjunctum – RS
- Parmotrema consors **B** – MT, MS, MG, RJ, SP, PR, SC, RS
- Parmotrema coralliforme – SP, RS
- Parmotrema cornigerum – MA
- Parmotrema cornutum **B** – MT, MS
- Parmotrema crassescens **B** – AM, PA, MA, MS, MG
- Parmotrema crinitum – AC, PE, AL, BA, MT, MS, RJ, SP, PR, SC, RS
- Parmotrema cristatum – TO, MA, MT, MS
- Parmotrema cristiferum – AC, AM, PA, AP, MA, AL, SE, BA, MT, MG, SP, PR
- Parmotrema cristobaliae – MS
- Parmotrema cryptoxanthoides **B** – SP, PR
- Parmotrema dactylosum **B** – SC, RS
- Parmotrema delicatulum **B** – AL, MS, MG, RJ, SP, PR, RS
- Parmotrema diffractaicum – MG, PR, SC, RS
- Parmotrema dilatatum **B** – AM, RO, PA, TO, MA, PE, AL, SE, MS, DF, MG, ES, RJ, SP, PR, SC, RS
- Parmotrema disparile – PA
- Parmotrema dissimile **B** – PR, RS
- Parmotrema dominicanum – SE
- Parmotrema eborinum – PA
- Parmotrema eciliatum – PE, MG, RJ, SP, PR, SC, RS
- Parmotrema eitenii **B** – SP, RS
- Parmotrema elacinulatum – MA, SP
- Parmotrema eliasaroanum **B** – SP
- Parmotrema endosulphureum – AC, PA, TO, MA, AL, BA, MT, MS, RJ, SP, PR, SC, RS
- Parmotrema epicladum – SP, RS
- Parmotrema erubescens – State unknown
- Parmotrema eurysacum – MG, PR, RS
- Parmotrema expansum – MG, SP
- Parmotrema fasciculatum – PA, MT, SP
- Parmotrema flavescens **B** – PE, AL, MS, MG, RJ, SP, PR, SC, RS
- Parmotrema flavomedullosum **B** – MS, SP, PR, SC, RS
- Parmotrema flavotinctum – PA
- Parmotrema fleigiae **B** – RS
- Parmotrema friabile **B** – MG, SC
- Parmotrema fumarprotocetraricum **B** – BA, ES, SP, PR, SC, RS
- Parmotrema gardneri **B** – AM, PA, TO, MA, CE, PE, SE, BA, MT, DF, MG, ES, SP, PR, SC, RS
- Parmotrema gibberosum **B** – PR
- Parmotrema gradsteinii – MA
- Parmotrema graniticum **B** – SP
- Parmotrema hababianum – MA
- Parmotrema haitiense – PE, RS
- Parmotrema herrei – RS
- Parmotrema homotomum **B** – MG, PR, RS
- Parmotrema horridum **B** – PE, RS
- Parmotrema hydrium **B** – PE, SP
- Parmotrema hyperlaciniatulum **B** – PE, SP
- Parmotrema hypermaculatum **B** – SP, PR, SC
- Parmotrema hypomiltoides **B** – MG, SP, PR, SC, RS
- Parmotrema indicum – SP, RS
- Parmotrema internexum **B** – PE, MG, SP, PR, SC, RS
- Parmotrema laciniellum – SP, SC
- Parmotrema lacteum **B** – MT, SP, RS
- Parmotrema laongii **B** – MT, SP
- Parmotrema latissimum – AM, PA, TO, MA, PE, MT, MS, MG, SC
- Parmotrema leonis – PR
- Parmotrema leucosemothetum – MS, MG, SP, PR, RS
- Parmotrema lichexanthonicum **B** – MT, MG, ES, SP
- Parmotrema lobulatum **B** – SP
- Parmotrema lobuliferum **B** – MG, RS
- Parmotrema louisianae – MA, PE
- Parmotrema lyngeanum **B** – MT
- Parmotrema macrocarpum – PE, GO, MG, RJ, SP, PR, RS
- Parmotrema madilynae **B** – MG, SP, PR, SC, RS
- Parmotrema magnum **B** – AL, BA, MG, ES, RJ
- Parmotrema mantiqueirense **B** – MG, ES, PR, RS
- Parmotrema maraense **B** – ES, SP, PR, SC
- Parmotrema marcellianum – PR
- Parmotrema marcellii **B** – SC
- Parmotrema margaritatum – AL, SC, RS
- Parmotrema masonii – MT, MS, SP, RS
- Parmotrema melanochaetum – MA, PE, MT, MS, GO, SP
- Parmotrema melanothrix **B** – MA, MT, MS, MG, ES, RJ, SP, PR, SC, RS
- Parmotrema mellissii – AM, RO, PE, AL, SE, BA, MT, DF, MG, ES, RJ, SP, PR, SC, RS
- Parmotrema merrillii – MT, SP
- Parmotrema mesogenes – MA
- Parmotrema mesotropum – MA, BA, MT, MS, GO, SP, PR, RS
- Parmotrema michauxianum – SP
- Parmotrema milanezii **B** – SP
- Parmotrema mirandum – PE, MS, MG, SP, PR
- Parmotrema mordenii – TO, MA, PE, AL, BA, MT, MS, MG, SP, PR, SC, RS
- Parmotrema muelleri **B** – MS, MG, SP, PR, RS
- Parmotrema myelochroum – MG, SP
- Parmotrema neosubcrinitum **B** – MG, SP, PR, RS
- Parmotrema neotropicum – PA, PE, AL, BA, GO, MG, ES, RJ, SP, PR, RS
- Parmotrema nilgherrense – PR
- Parmotrema nyasensis – CE, PE, MT, MG, ES, SP, PR, SC, RS
- Parmotrema nylanderi **B** – PE, BA, MT, DF, MG, SP
- Parmotrema ochroglaucum – RS
- Parmotrema overeemii – RO
- Parmotrema pachydermum – RS
- Parmotrema paraense **B** – PA, BA
- Parmotrema paulense **B** – SP
- Parmotrema pectinatum **B** – SP
- Parmotrema peralbidum – SP, RS
- Parmotrema perlatum – AM, MG, RJ, SP, PR, SC, RS
- Parmotrema permutatum – PE, MG, SP, PR, RS
- Parmotrema petropoliense **B** – RJ
- Parmotrema pigmentosum **B** – PA
- Parmotrema pilosum – SP, PR, RS
- Parmotrema pontagrossense **B** – MG, PR, RS
- Parmotrema praeisidiosum **B** – CE, PE, BA, PR
- Parmotrema praesorediosum – AC, AM, RO, PA, TO, MA, CE, RN, PE, AL, SE, BA, MT, MS, MG, RJ, SP, PR, SC, RS
- Parmotrema progenes **B** – AM, PA, BA
- Parmotrema protolobulatum **B** – MG
- Parmotrema pseudocrintum – MG
- Parmotrema pseudonilgherrense – RS
- Parmotrema pseudoreticulatum – RS
- Parmotrema pseudotinctorum – RS
- Parmotrema pycnidiocarpum **B** – SP
- Parmotrema rampoddense – PE, BA, MG, SP, PR, RS
- Parmotrema ramusculum – AM, PA
- Parmotrema recipiendum **B** – MT, ES, SP, PR, RS
- Parmotrema reitzii **B** – SC, RS
- Parmotrema reparatum – MG, RS
- Parmotrema restingense **B** – SP
- Parmotrema reticulatum – CE, PE, AL, SE, BA, MT, MS, GO, DF, MG, ES, RJ, SP, PR, SC, RS
- Parmotrema rigidum **B** – SC, RS
- Parmotrema robustum – AP, AL, SE, BA, MT, MG, SP, PR, SC, RS
- Parmotrema rubifaciens – AM, TO, MA, MS, MG, SP
- Parmotrema ruptum – RS
- Parmotrema sanctae-candidae **B** – PR
- Parmotrema sancti-angeli **B** – PE, MT, GO, MG, ES, RJ, SP, PR, SC, RS
- Parmotrema schindleri **B** – ES, PR, RS
- Parmotrema screminiae **B** – MS
- Parmotrema simulans **B** – MG, ES, SP, PR, SC, RS
- Parmotrema soredioaliphaticum – MS, RS
- Parmotrema sorediosulphuratum **B** – SP, PR
- Parmotrema spinibarbe **B** – MA, RJ, SP, PR, SC, RS
- Parmotrema stuppeum – MA
- Parmotrema subarnoldii – SP, PR, RS
- Parmotrema subcaperatum **B** – MT, MS, DF, MG, RJ, SP, PR, SC, RS
- Parmotrema subisidiosum – SE, BA, DF, SP, SC, RS
- Parmotrema submarginale – SP
- Parmotrema subochraceum **B** – PA, MA, PE, AL, SP, PR, SC
- Parmotrema subreparatum **B** – SP
- Parmotrema subrugatum **B** – PA, BA, MG, RJ, SP, PR, SC, RS
- Parmotrema subsumptum **B** – MT, MS, DF, MG, ES, RJ, SP, PR, SC, RS
- Parmotrema subtinctorium – PE, AL, BA, MT, MS, MG, PR, RS
- Parmotrema succinreticulatum **B** – PR, RS
- Parmotrema sulphuratum – AM, PA, AP, PE, AL, SE, BA, MT, MS, RJ, SP, PR
- Parmotrema superaguiense **B** – PR
- Parmotrema tinctorum – AM, PA, TO, MA, CE, PE, AL, SE, BA, MT, MS, GO, DF, MG, ES, RJ, SP, PR, SC, RS
- Parmotrema ultralucens – MG, SP, SC, RS
- Parmotrema uruguense – MG, SP, RS
- Parmotrema wainoi **B** – PE, MT, MG, ES, RJ, SP, PR, SC, RS
- Parmotrema warmingii **B** – AL, BA, MT, MG, ES, SP
- Parmotrema wrightii **B** – TO, MS, SP
- Parmotrema yodae – RS
- Parmotrema zicoi **B** – MG, SP
- Parmotrema zollingeri – AC, AM, PA, MA, PE, AL, MT, ES
- Parmotremopsis antillensis – MA, PE, MG, SP, RS
- Paulia cubana – MS
- Paulia gibbosa – MS
- Paulia stipitata – MS
- Paulia tessellata – MS
- Peltigera austroamericana **B** – MG, ES, RJ, SP, PR, SC, RS
- Peltigera didactyla – RS
- Peltigera dolichorhiza – MG, RJ, SC
- Peltigera horizontalis – RJ
- Peltigera itatiaiae **B** – MG
- Peltigera kukwae **B** – MG
- Peltigera laciniata – ES, SP, PR, SC
- Peltigera massonii **B** – MG
- Peltigera pulverulenta – MG, RJ
- Peltigera rufescens – MG
- Peltigera spuriella **B** – MG
- Peltigera ulcerata – MG, ES, RJ, SP, PR, SC
- Peltula anthracina **B** – MS
- Peltula auriculata – RR, MS, RS
- Peltula bolanderi – RJ, SC, RS
- Peltula boletiformis – BA
- Peltula brasiliensis **B** – AM, AP, MT, MG, SP, SC, RS
- Peltula clavata **B** – AL, MT, MS, ES, RJ, SC, RS
- Peltula congregata – PE, MG, ES, RS
- Peltula corticola – RO, CE, SE, MS
- Peltula euploca – CE, PE, AL, SE, BA, MS, MG, RJ, RS
- Peltula farinosa – SE, BA, RS
- Peltula impressa – CE, PE, BA
- Peltula koflerae – RS
- Peltula leptophylla **B** – MS, RJ
- Peltula lingulata – AM, MT, MS, RS
- Peltula nigrotestudinea **B** – SE
- Peltula obscurans – TO, CE, PE, SE, MT, MS, RS
- Peltula omphaliza – MS
- Peltula patellata – SE, MS
- Peltula placodizans – PE, SE, MS
- Peltula rodriguesii – SE, RS
- Peltula tenuis – RS
- Peltula tortuosa – RR, PE, MS, MG, ES, RJ, RS
- Pertusaria achroiza – SP
- Pertusaria acromelana **B** – SP
- Pertusaria aggregata **B** – SP
- Pertusaria amazonica **B** – AM
- Pertusaria ampliata **B** – RJ, SP
- Pertusaria anisospora **B** – RJ, SC
- Pertusaria araucariae **B** – SP
- Pertusaria bonariensis **B** – RS
- Pertusaria brasiliana **B** – SP
- Pertusaria carneoalbida **B** – SP
- Pertusaria carneola **B** – PA, PE, AL, SE, BA, MS, RS
- Pertusaria cerussata **B** – MT, RS
- Pertusaria colorans **B** – RS
- Pertusaria consanguinea **B** – SP, RS
- Pertusaria corrugata **B** – MT, RJ, SP, SC
- Pertusaria cryptocarpoides **B** – SP
- Pertusaria cryptostoma **B** – MG
- Pertusaria curatellae **B** – MT, MS
- Pertusaria dealbata – RJ
- Pertusaria dehiscens **B** – CE, PB, PE, AL, SE, MS, MG, RJ, SP, PR, SC
- Pertusaria delicatula **B** – RJ
- Pertusaria depressa – MT, RJ, SP, RS
- Pertusaria dilatata **B** – RJ, SP
- Pertusaria elizabethae **B** – DF, RJ
- Pertusaria ferax **B** – RJ
- Pertusaria flavens – CE, RN, PB, PE, AL, SE, BA, MT, MS, GO, MG, RJ, SP, SC, RS
- Pertusaria flavicans – MG
- Pertusaria flavoisidiata – SE, BA
- Pertusaria glaziovii **B** – MT, RJ
- Pertusaria hypoxantha **B** – MT
- Pertusaria impallescens – MT
- Pertusaria leioplacella – MT, MG, RJ, SP, RS
- Pertusaria leucoplaca **B** – SP
- Pertusaria lichexanthofarinosa **B** – BA, DF, MG, SC
- Pertusaria lichexanthoimmersa **B** – BA, MG, RS
- Pertusaria lignicola **B** – RS
- Pertusaria lutescens **B** – BA, RJ
- Pertusaria malmei **B** – MT
- Pertusaria marcellii **B** – SP
- Pertusaria mattogrossensis **B** – MT
- Pertusaria mundula **B** – SP
- Pertusaria nigrata **B** – RJ, SP
- Pertusaria oblongata **B** – SP
- Pertusaria ochrostoma **B** – RJ, SP
- Pertusaria ochrotheliza – RJ, SP
- Pertusaria ostiolata – RS
- Pertusaria paraensis **B** – PA, MT
- Pertusaria peliostoma – RJ
- Pertusaria pertusella **B** – RJ, SC
- Pertusaria phaeostoma **B** – SP
- Pertusaria platystoma **B** – MS
- Pertusaria polycarpa **B** – RJ
- Pertusaria purpurascens **B** – RJ, SP
- Pertusaria pycnophora – RJ, RS
- Pertusaria pycnotheliodes **B** – RJ
- Pertusaria quassiae – CE, PB, PE, AL, SE, BA, MT, MS, RJ, RS
- Pertusaria rarotongensis – SP
- Pertusaria reagens **B** – ES, RJ
- Pertusaria rhodiza – SP
- Pertusaria rhodostomoides **B** – MG
- Pertusaria rudecta **B** – SP
- Pertusaria saxatilis **B** – MG
- Pertusaria scutellaris **B** – SP
- Pertusaria simulans **B** – MT
- Pertusaria subcorallina **B** – RJ, SP
- Pertusaria subcoronata **B** – SP
- Pertusaria subirregularis **B** – MT, MG, RJ, SP
- Pertusaria subrigida **B** – RJ, SP
- Pertusaria syngenetica **B** – SP
- Pertusaria tenella **B** – SP
- Pertusaria tesselaria – MT, RJ
- Pertusaria tetrathalamia **B** – PE, AL, SE, MT, MS, MG, RJ, SP, SC, RS
- Pertusaria texana – AL, MG
- Pertusaria thiospoda – RS
- Pertusaria torquatella **B** – MG
- Pertusaria trypetheliiformis – RJ
- Pertusaria tuberculifera – MG, RJ, SP
- Pertusaria velloziae **B** – MG, RJ, SP
- Pertusaria verruculifera **B** – MG, SP
- Pertusaria wulfenioides – PE, AL, SE, BA, MG, RS
- Phaeographina mosenii **B** – SP (provisionally accepted)
- Phaeographis adspersa **B** – PA, PR
- Phaeographis alcicornis **B** – MT, SP
- Phaeographis apex – RJ (provisionally accepted)
- Phaeographis arthonioides – RS
- Phaeographis atrolabiata **B** – MT
- Phaeographis aureopruinosa **B** – RO
- Phaeographis brasiliensis **B** – AC, AM, RO, PA, AP, TO, MA, CE, RN, PB, PE, AL, SE, BA, MT, MS, GO, DF, MG, RJ, SP, PR, SC, RS
- Phaeographis caesiodisca **B** – AM, CE, PE, SE, MT, MS, SP
- Phaeographis caesioradians – BA, MT
- Phaeographis cascarillae – RJ
- Phaeographis cheilomegas **B** – State unknown
- Phaeographis chondrina **B** – RJ (provisionally accepted)
- Phaeographis cinnabarina – SP
- Phaeographis coccinea **B** – RO
- Phaeographis coriaria **B** – RO
- Phaeographis crassa – RJ
- Phaeographis cymbegrapha **B** – AM, PB, BA
- Phaeographis dendritica – AC, AM, CE, RN, PB, PE, SE, BA, MS, MG, ES, RJ, SP, PR, SC, RS
- Phaeographis diversa – PA
- Phaeographis elliptica – PB, SE
- Phaeographis epruinosa **B** – AP, TO, AL, BA, MT, SP
- Phaeographis erumpens – State unknown
- Phaeographis extrusa – State unknown
- Phaeographis flavescens **B** – TO, MA, ES, PR, RS
- Phaeographis fulgurans **B** – AM, AP, BA, SP
- Phaeographis fusca **B** – PE, AL, SE, SP
- Phaeographis fuscobilabiata **B** – AM
- Phaeographis haematites – AC, AM, RO, PA, AP, TO, MA, CE, PB, PE, AL, SE, BA, MT, MS, MG, ES, RJ, SP, PR, SC
- Phaeographis inconspicua – RO, CE, MS, GO, SP
- Phaeographis instrata **B** – RN
- Phaeographis intricans – RO, TO, MA, CE, PB, PE, SE, BA, MT, MS, MG, ES, RJ, SP, RS
- Phaeographis inusta – RO, CE, SE, BA, RJ, SP, SC
- Phaeographis inustula – RO
- Phaeographis kalbii **B** – PE, AL, BA, MG, RJ, SP, SC, RS
- Phaeographis leiogrammodes **B** – AC, AM, PA, TO, MA, PB, PE, SE, BA, MT, MS, MG, RJ, SP, PR, SC
- Phaeographis leucocheila – RO
- Phaeographis lindigiana – AM, SE, MT, SP
- Phaeographis lobata **B** – RN, PE, AL, SE, BA, MT, ES, RJ, SP, PR, SC, RS
- Phaeographis macrocephalica **B** – AM
- Phaeographis major **B** – TO, RJ
- Phaeographis medusiformis **B** – BA, MS, MG, RJ, PR, RS
- Phaeographis neotricosa **B** – AM, CE, PB, PE, SE, BA, MT, MS, SP, RS
- Phaeographis norscalpturata **B** – AP
- Phaeographis nylanderi – AM, PA, AP, RN, PB, PE, SE, BA, MT
- Phaeographis oxalifera **B** – MT
- Phaeographis pallidoxanthonica **B** – RO
- Phaeographis pezizoidea – RS
- Phaeographis platycarpa – SE, BA, MS, RJ, SP, RS
- Phaeographis punctiformis **B** – CE, PE, AL, SE, BA, MS, SC, RS
- Phaeographis quadrifera – RO, TO, PE
- Phaeographis radiatoramosa **B** – SP, RS
- Phaeographis rubrostroma **B** – PE, SE
- Phaeographis sangrensis – MT, RS
- Phaeographis scalpturata – AC, AM, RO, PA, TO, PB, PE, AL, SE, BA, MT, MS, MG, ES, RJ, SP, PR, SC
- Phaeographis schizoloma **B** – SE, MT, SP, PR, RS
- Phaeographis scriptitata – RO
- Phaeographis smithii – PR
- Phaeographis spondaica – CE, PE, BA, MG, ES, RJ, SP, PR, SC, RS
- Phaeographis subbifida – AM, AP
- Phaeographis subintricata – PE, MG
- Phaeographis subtigrina – RS
- Phaeographis tortuosa – AM, RO, PB, PE, AL, SE
- Phaeographis vestigioides – RO
- Phaeographis vulcanica **B** – BA
- Phaeographis xantholirellinata **B** – AM
- Phaeographis xanthonica **B** – MG, RJ
- Phaeophyscia endococcinodes – State unknown
- Phaeophyscia hispidula – AL, MG, SP, SC, RS
- Phlyctis andensis – RJ
- Phlyctis brasiliensis **B** – RN, PE, MT, MS, DF, MG, ES, RJ, SP, PR, SC, RS
- Phlyctis calyptica **B** – RJ
- Phlyctis offula **B** – MT
- Phlyctis pulveracea – MS, RS
- Phlyctis sorediiformis **B** – RJ
- Phlyctis subcalyptica **B** – MT
- Phylliscidium monophyllum **B** – RJ
- Phylliscum vermiformis – AM, MT, MG
- Phyllobaeis erythrella – MG, RJ, PR, SC, RS
- Phyllobaeis rhodochroa **B** – MG, RJ
- Phyllobaeis rubescens **B** – MG, SP, PR, SC
- Phyllobathelium anomalum – PB, PE
- Phyllobathelium chlorogastricum **B** – AC, AM, PA, PE, AL, MT, MS, MG, ES, RJ, SP, SC, RS
- Phyllobathelium firmum **B** – AM, PE, BA, RJ, SP, SC, RS
- Phyllobathelium leguminosae **B** – AC, RO, PE, SP, PR
- Phylloblastia amazonica **B** – AM, RO, PA, PR
- Phylloblastia borhidii – PE, SP
- Phylloblastia inconspicua – AM
- Phylloblastia septemseptata – PE, SP
- Phyllocharis orbicularis – AM, PE, ES, RJ, RS
- Phyllogyalidea epiphylla – AM, RO, PA, CE, PE, MT, RJ, SP
- Phylloporis cinefaciens – AM, PA, SP
- Phylloporis obducta **B** – AM, PA, PE, MT, RJ, SP
- Phylloporis palmae **B** – AM, AP
- Phylloporis phyllogena **B** – AC, AM, RO, PA, PE, AL, BA, MT, ES, RJ, SP, PR, SC, RS
- Phylloporis platypoda **B** – AC, AM, RO, PA, PE, BA, MT, MS, RJ, SP
- Phylloporis viridis – PB, PE, PR
- Phylloporis vulgaris **B** – PB, PE, BA, RJ, SP, PR
- Phyllopsora amazonica **B** – PA
- Phyllopsora atrocarpa – AC, RO
- Phyllopsora breviuscula – AP, SE, BA, MT, MG, SP, SC, RS
- Phyllopsora buettneri – AM, RO, PA, AP, PE, AL, SE, BA, MS, MG, RJ, SP, PR, SC, RS
- Phyllopsora byssigera **B** – SP
- Phyllopsora chlorophaea **B** – RO, AP, PE, AL, BA, MS, MG, SP, RS
- Phyllopsora chodatinica – AM, AP
- Phyllopsora cinchonarum – AC, AM, RO, PA, AP, TO, MA, AL, SE, BA, MT, MS, MG, RJ, SP, RS
- Phyllopsora cognata – SE, SP
- Phyllopsora concinna – RJ
- Phyllopsora confusa – AM, PA, AP, MA, SE, MT, MS, MG, RJ, SP, PR, SC, RS
- Phyllopsora corallina **B** – AC, RO, AP, SE, BA, MT, MS, MG, RJ, SP, SC, RS
- Phyllopsora curatellae **B** – MT
- Phyllopsora cuyabensis **B** – AM, RR, MT, MS, RS
- Phyllopsora fendleri – AM, SP
- Phyllopsora furfuracea – AC, AM, RO, RR, PA, AP, PB, PE, AL, SE, BA, MT, MS, MG, ES, RJ, SP, PR, SC, RS
- Phyllopsora furfurella – RJ
- Phyllopsora glabella – MT
- Phyllopsora glaucella **B** – ES, SP
- Phyllopsora glaucescens – MT
- Phyllopsora gossypina – AC, AM, RO, AP, AL, SE, MT, MS, GO, ES, RJ, SP
- Phyllopsora granulatofurfuracea **B** – RJ
- Phyllopsora haemophaea – PR
- Phyllopsora isidiosa – MS, SP
- Phyllopsora isidiotyla **B** – RO, AL, SE, MS, MG, RJ, RS
- Phyllopsora lividocarpa – RO, RS
- Phyllopsora longiuscula – AC, AM, RO, PA, PE, AL, SE, MT, MS, SP, SC
- Phyllopsora microphyllina – AM
- Phyllopsora neotinica – ES, RJ, SP, PR
- Phyllopsora nigrocincta – AC, AM, RO, PA, AP, MT, MS
- Phyllopsora ochroxantha – AM, RO, RR, PA, AP, BA, GO, MG, RJ, SP, PR, SC, RS
- Phyllopsora parvifolia **B** – AM, PA, AL, BA, MT, MS, MG, ES, RJ, SP, PR, SC, RS
- Phyllopsora parvifoliella – AM, RO, PE, BA, MG
- Phyllopsora pyrrhomelaena – AC, AM, AP, PE, BA, MT, MS, SP, PR, SC
- Phyllopsora pyxinoides – AC, AM, RO, AP, CE, AL, SE, BA, MT, MS, GO, MG, ES, RJ, SP, PR, SC, RS
- Phyllopsora santensis – AC, AM, RO, PA, AP, TO, MA, AL, BA, MT, MS, SP, PR
- Phyllopsora soralifera – AM, RO, AL, SE, MT, MS, PR
- Phyllopsora sorediata – AP
- Phyllopsora stylophora **B** – MT
- Phyllopsora subcrustacea – PE, BA
- Phyllopsora swinscowii – AM, RO, PA, AP
- Phyllopsora thaleriza – MT, MS, SP, RS
- Physcia aipolia – CE, PE, MT, MS, SP, RS
- Physcia alba – CE, MT, MS, GO, MG, ES, RJ, SP, SC, RS
- Physcia atrostriata – AC, RO, AP, MA, PE, AL, SE, BA, MT, MS, DF, MG, ES, SP, PR, SC, RS
- Physcia caesia – CE, RJ, RS
- Physcia convexa – SE, BA, MS, MG, ES, RJ, SP, SC, RS
- Physcia crispa – CE, MS, RJ, SP, RS
- Physcia decorticata – RJ
- Physcia erumpens – AP, MS, RJ, SP, PR, SC, RS
- Physcia integrata – MT, MS, MG, ES, RJ, SP, PR, SC, RS
- Physcia kalbii **B** – MS, RJ, SP, PR, SC, RS
- Physcia krogiae – RO, MA, AL, SE, MT, MS, GO, MG, ES, RJ, SP, PR, SC, RS
- Physcia lacinulata – MS, RS
- Physcia lopezii – SP
- Physcia manuelii – MS
- Physcia microphylla **B** – MS, ES, RJ
- Physcia mobergii – SP
- Physcia ochroleuca **B** – SP, RS
- Physcia pachyphylla **B** – MT, MS, SP, PR
- Physcia phaeocarpa **B** – MT, MS, MG, ES, SP, PR, SC, RS
- Physcia poncinsii – RO, PE, SE, BA, MT, MS, ES, SP, PR, SC, RS
- Physcia rolfii – CE, PE, SE, MT, MS, RJ, SP, RS
- Physcia sinuosa **B** – CE, PE, BA, MT, MS, MG, SP, RS
- Physcia sorediiconvexa **B** – PE, AL, BA, SP
- Physcia sorediosa **B** – AC, AP, MA, CE, PE, AL, SE, BA, MT, MS, GO, MG, ES, RJ, SP, PR, SC, RS
- Physcia sublactea **B** – SP
- Physcia tenuis **B** – RJ, SP, RS
- Physcia tribacia – RJ, RS
- Physcia tribacioides – BA, SP, PR, RS
- Physcia undulata – CE, SP, PR, RS
- Physciella chloantha – MG, RS
- Physcidia carassensis **B** – MG, SP
- Physcidia mattogrossensis **B** – MT
- Physcidia neotropica **B** – SP
- Physcidia squamulosa – AM, PA, MG, RJ, SP
- Physcidia striata **B** – AC, AM, RO, PA, AP, MT, MS
- Physcidia wrightii – PA, MT, SP
- Physciella neotropica **B** – MS, PR
- Physma byrsaeum – PA, BA, ES, RJ, SP, SC
- Piccolia conspersa – SE, BA, MT, MS, GO, MG, ES, RJ, SP, SC, RS
- Piccolia wrightii – RS
- Placidiopsis hypothallina **B** – MT, MS, MG, RJ, SC
- Placidium corticola – SE, MS, RS
- Placidium lacinulatum – RS
- Placynthiella dasaea – SC
- Placynthiella icmalea – AC, AL, MG, ES, SP, PR
- Placynthiella oligotropha – BA
- Placynthiella termitophila **B** – MT, RS
- Placynthiella uliginosa – AM, RS
- Platygramme arechavaletae – RS
- Platygramme caesiopruinosa – AC, AM, RO, AP, CE, PE, SE, BA, MT, MS, GO, MG, ES, RJ, SP, PR, SC, RS
- Platygramme colubrosa – AL, SE, MT, MG
- Platygramme computata – MA
- Platygramme discurrens – AM, RO, BA
- Platygramme muelleri – PR
- Platygramme norstictica – BA, MG
- Platygramme pachyspora **B** – PA, MT
- Platygramme reticulata **B** – BA, RJ, SP, PR, RS
- Platygramme unirana **B** – RO
- Platythecium acutisporum **B** – RO, AP, MT, MG, SP
- Platythecium allosporellum **B** – AM, RO, PE, SE, BA, MT, MG, ES, RJ, SP, PR
- Platythecium annonaceum **B** – MT
- Platythecium biseptatum **B** – AM, RO
- Platythecium colliculosum – AM, PA, TO, AL, SE, BA, SC
- Platythecium dimorphodes – AC, TO, PE, AL, SE
- Platythecium grammitis – AC, AM, PA, AP, TO, SE, BA, MT, MG, RJ, SP, SC, RS
- Platythecium inspersum **B** – SP
- Platythecium leiogramma – AC, AM, AP, SE, BA, MT, MS, MG, ES, RJ, SP, PR
- Platythecium serpentinellum – TO, CE
- Platythecium sphaerosporellum **B** – PA, PE, MT, RJ, RS
- Platythecium suberythrellum – TO
- Plectocarpon syncesioides **B** – AL
- Podostictina encoensis – RS
- Podostictina flavicans – RJ, SP
- Polyblastia fuscoargillacea – MS
- Polyblastia philaea – SE
- Polyblastiopsis caesiella **B** – SP (provisionally accepted)
- Polyblastiopsis verruculosa **B** – SP (provisionally accepted)
- Polycauliona candelaria – RJ
- Polymeridium albidoreagens **B** – PA, CE, SE, BA
- Polymeridium albidovarians – AM, BA
- Polymeridium albidum **B** – AM, RR, MA, CE, SE, BA, ES, PR
- Polymeridium albocinereum **B** – MA, CE, PE, AL, SE, MT, ES, RJ, SC
- Polymeridium alboflavescens – RO, TO, CE, BA, MT, MS
- Polymeridium albopruinosum – AM, PA, CE, PE
- Polymeridium amyloideum **B** – AM, RR, PA, CE
- Polymeridium bengoanum – CE, PE
- Polymeridium biloculare **B** – RR
- Polymeridium catapastoides – CE, BA
- Polymeridium catapastum – RR, PA, MA, CE, PB, PE, AL, SE, BA, MT, MG, SP
- Polymeridium chioneum – AM, CE
- Polymeridium cinereonigricans **B** – PE, SE, MT, MS, MG
- Polymeridium contendens – CE, SE, MG, ES
- Polymeridium corticatum **B** – CE, PE
- Polymeridium costaricense – TO, CE, MT
- Polymeridium dithecium – AM, CE, PE
- Polymeridium endocrocinum – AM
- Polymeridium endoflavens **B** – SE
- Polymeridium inspersum – CE, SE, BA, ES
- Polymeridium jordanii – AM, CE, PE, AL, SE, BA, ES
- Polymeridium julelloides **B** – PI, CE, PE, BA, MT, MS
- Polymeridium longiflavens **B** – SE, BA
- Polymeridium microsporum – CE, BA
- Polymeridium multiforme – AM, PA, CE, BA
- Polymeridium multiseptatum **B** – CE
- Polymeridium neblinae – PB, SE
- Polymeridium pleiomerellum – MA, CE, PE, SE, BA, MT, MS
- Polymeridium pyrenuloides – CE, SP
- Polymeridium quinqueseptatum – PA, CE, PB, PE, AL, BA
- Polymeridium siamense – AP, CE, PB, SE
- Polymeridium simulans – AM, CE, BA
- Polymeridium stramineoatrum **B** – PB, PE, MG
- Polymeridium stromatocorticatum **B** – SE
- Polymeridium subcinereum – PA, MA, CE, PB, PE, AL, SE, BA, SP
- Polymeridium subvirescens **B** – AM, RO, PA, MA, CE, MT, MS
- Polymeridium suffusum – RO, CE, PB, SE
- Polymeridium tribulationis – CE
- Polymeridium xanthoreagens – SE
- Polystroma fernandezii – AM
- Porina adflata **B** – AL, MG, SP
- Porina aenea – RO, SE
- Porina africana – RO, PE, AL, SE, MT, MS, RJ, RS
- Porina alba – AM, RO, PA, AP, PB, PE, SE, BA, MT, MS, SP, SC
- Porina albotomentosa **B** – MS
- Porina alineata **B** – RS
- Porina ambigua **B** – CE, PE, RS
- Porina americana – AM, PA, AP, MT, RS
- Porina andreana – PE, SP
- Porina applanata – AM
- Porina atlantica – RO, AP, PE, BA, SP, RS
- Porina atriceps – AM, PA, PE, RS
- Porina atrocoerulea **B** – PE, ES, SP, PR, SC, RS
- Porina atropunctata – PA, PE, SP, PR, RS
- Porina borreri – SP
- Porina cestrensis – PE, AL, SE, MS, RS
- Porina chlorotica – AM, MA, CE, SE, BA, MT, MS, MG, SC
- Porina conica – AC
- Porina conspersa **B** – AM, RO, PA, TO, CE, PB, PE, AL, SE, MT, MS, SP, PR, RS
- Porina coralloidea – TO, AL, MS
- Porina cryptostoma **B** – PA, PB, SE, MT, MS
- Porina cubana – AM, PE, MT, MS, MG, SP, RS
- Porina deremensis – SP
- Porina desquamescens – AM, BA, RJ, SP, RS
- Porina distans – AC, AM, RO, AP, RN, PB, PE, AL, SE, BA, MT, MS, MG, ES, SP, PR, SC, RS
- Porina dolichophora – RO, RJ, RS
- Porina elegans **B** – MT
- Porina eminentior – AM, MT, RJ, RS
- Porina epilucida – PE, SE
- Porina epiphylla – AC, AM, RO, PA, AP, PB, PE, AL, SE, BA, MT, MS, MG, ES, RJ, SP, PR, SC, RS
- Porina epiphylloides – AM, MT, ES
- Porina exasperatula **B** – PB
- Porina exserta **B** – RJ, SP, RS
- Porina farinosa – PA, AP, CE, PE, AL, SE, BA, MT, MG, RJ, SC
- Porina fulvella **B** – AM, CE, PB, PE, BA, MT, MS, MG, ES, RJ, SP, PR, SC, RS
- Porina fusca – AM, RO, PA, PE, SE, MT, SP
- Porina gracilis **B** – MT
- Porina guentheri – RO, SE, MT, MG, SC, RS
- Porina guianensis – AC, AM, RO, PA, AP, MA, SE, MT, SP
- Porina hemisphaerica **B** – PA
- Porina hibernica – TO
- Porina imitatrix **B** – AC, AM, RO, PA, PB, PE, AL, SE, BA, MT, ES, RJ, SP, SC, RS
- Porina interjungens – AM
- Porina internigrans – AM, RO, PA, AP, PB, PE, AL, SE, MT, GO, ES
- Porina intrusula **B** – AM
- Porina isidioambigua **B** – AC, AM, RO, AP, CE, AL, SE, BA, MT, MS, SP, SC
- Porina kameruniensis – RO
- Porina karnatakensis – RO, PA, AP, PE, SP, PR, SC, RS
- Porina lateralis **B** – ES
- Porina lectissima – SE
- Porina leptalea – RO, MA, CE, PE, AL, MS, MG
- Porina leptosperma **B** – AM, PE, BA, RJ, SP, RS
- Porina leptospermoides **B** – AM, RO, PA, PB, PE, BA, RJ, SP, SC
- Porina limbulata – AM, PA, PE, SE, BA, MT, MG, RJ, SP, PR, SC, RS
- Porina limitata – AL
- Porina linearispora **B** – RO, AP
- Porina lucida – AM, RO, PA, PE, MS, SP
- Porina malmei **B** – MS, RS
- Porina mastoidea – AC, AM, RO, PA, AP, TO, RN, PB, PE, AL, SE, BA, MT, MS, GO, MG, ES, RJ, SP, PR, SC, RS
- Porina maxispora **B** – AM, RO, PA, AP
- Porina melanops **B** – AM, PA, MA, AL, SE, BA, MT, MS
- Porina mendax **B** – SP (provisionally accepted)
- Porina moralesiae – AC, MT
- Porina muelleri **B** – RJ
- Porina muralisidiata **B** – RS
- Porina nanella **B** – RS
- Porina nigrofusca **B** – MT, MS, MG, SP, RS
- Porina nitidula **B** – AM, PA, CE, PE, SE, MS, ES, RJ, SP, PR, SC, RS
- Porina novemseptatoides **B** – RO, MS
- Porina nucula – AM, AP, TO, MA, CE, PB, PE, AL, SE, BA, MT, MS, DF, MG, RJ, SP, RS
- Porina nuculastrum – RO, PE, AL, SE
- Porina ocellata **B** – AM, MT
- Porina ochraceocarpa **B** – PE
- Porina octomera **B** – AM, PA, CE, PB, PE, BA, MT, MG, ES, RJ, SP, SC, RS
- Porina papillifera **B** – AM, MS, ES
- Porina paulensis **B** – SP
- Porina pelochroa **B** – SP, RS
- Porina pertensa **B** – AM
- Porina pichinchensis – PE
- Porina pilifera – RO
- Porina podocycla **B** – RS
- Porina polita **B** – RS
- Porina pseudoapplanata **B** – AM, RO, PA, AP, PB, PE, SE, MT, SP
- Porina pungens **B** – SC
- Porina purpurata **B** – PE
- Porina radiata **B** – AM, PA, AP, MT, SP
- Porina ramiisidiata **B** – AM
- Porina rapiformis **B** – RJ
- Porina repanda **B** – AM, RO
- Porina rhaphidosperma – MG, SP
- Porina rubentior **B** – AC, AM, RO, PA, CE, PB, PE, AL, SE, BA, MG, ES, RJ, SP, SC, RS
- Porina rubescens – PA, PB, PE, MS
- Porina rubrosphaera – RO, PE
- Porina rudiuscula – AP, PE, AL, BA, MT, SP, SC
- Porina rufula – AC, AM, PA, PE, AL, SE, BA, MT, MS, MG, RJ, SP, PR, SC, RS
- Porina scabrida – RO, PE, AL
- Porina septemseptata **B** – RJ, SP, RS
- Porina simulans **B** – AC, PB, AL, MT, MS, SC, RS
- Porina sordidula **B** – PE, RJ
- Porina sorediata **B** – AC, AM, AL, MT, MS
- Porina subcarpinea **B** – MT, MS
- Porina subepiphylla – AM, PA, AP, PB, PE, SP
- Porina subinterstes – AC, AM, RO, AP, MA, CE, PB, PE, AL, SE, BA, MT, MS, ES, RJ, SP
- Porina submundula **B** – SP (provisionally accepted)
- Porina subnucula – TO, PB
- Porina subolivacea **B** – SP, RS
- Porina subpungens **B** – PB, SE, BA
- Porina subrudiuscula **B** – SP, RS
- Porina taperinhae **B** – AM
- Porina termitophila **B** – RO
- Porina tetracerae – AM, RO, PA, AP, MA, CE, RN, PB, PE, AL, SE, BA, MT, MG, ES, RJ, SP, RS
- Porina tetralocularis – RO, BA
- Porina tetramera **B** – AM, PE, SE, MG, RJ, SP, PR, SC, RS
- Porina thaxteri – PE, SP
- Porina tijucana **B** – RJ, SP
- Porina verruculosa **B** – PE, RJ, SP, RS
- Porina vezdae – PE, SE, MS, MG, SP
- Porocyphus dimorphus – SE, MS, SC
- Porothelium rufofuscum **B** – State not indicated (provisionally accepted)
- Porpidia cinereoatra – SC
- Porpidia crustulata – MT
- Porpidia macrocarpa – SP
- Porpidia melinodes – RJ
- Porpidia platycarpoides – MG
- Porpidia tuberculosa – SP
- Protoparmelia badia – MG, SP, RS
- Psammina tropica **B** – RO, AP
- Psathyromyces heterellus **B** – AM, RO, PA, AP, CE, PE, BA, MT, SP, PR
- Pseudobogoriella annonacea – AL
- Pseudobogoriella captiosa **B** – MS, RJ, RS
- Pseudobogoriella confluens – SE, MS
- Pseudobogoriella exigua – AM, CE
- Pseudobogoriella fumosula – MS
- Pseudobogoriella hemispherica – AC, RO, CE, PE, SE, BA, MT, MS, RS
- Pseudobogoriella miculiformis – CE, PB, PE, SE, BA, MS
- Pseudobogoriella punctata – AC, MS, MG
- Pseudobogoriella subfallens – AM, CE, SE, GO, DF, RJ
- Pseudochapsa albomaculata – AC, AM, RO, PI, BA
- Pseudochapsa amylospora **B** – RO
- Pseudochapsa aptrootiana **B** – SE
- Pseudochapsa crispata **B** – RJ
- Pseudochapsa dilatata **B** – AC, AM, RO, PA, PI, PE, AL, SE, BA, MT, MG, ES, RJ, SP, RS
- Pseudochapsa esslingeri – SE
- Pseudochapsa lueckingii **B** – SP
- Pseudochapsa phlyctidioides – AC, AM, MS
- Pseudochapsa rhizophorae **B** – SP
- Pseudochapsa rivas-platae **B** – MT
- Pseudochapsa sipmanii **B** – RJ
- Pseudochapsa subdactylifera – AM, PA, AP, SP
- Pseudocyphellaria albocyphellata **B** – RS
- Pseudocyphellaria argyracea – SC, RS
- Pseudocyphellaria citrina – SP
- Pseudocyphellaria insculpta – MG
- Pseudocyphellaria intricata – SP, PR, RS
- Pseudocyphellaria kalbii **B** – RJ, SP, PR, RS
- Pseudocyphellaria sandwicensis – SP, RJ, RS
- Pseudocyphellaria subrubella – RS
- Pseudocyphellaria xanthosticta – RS
- Pseudoparmelia arida **B** – PE, MT, GO, MG, PR
- Pseudoparmelia brakoana **B** – MG, PR
- Pseudoparmelia buckiana **B** – MT, GO
- Pseudoparmelia chapadensis **B** – AM, PA, MT, MS, GO
- Pseudoparmelia cubensis – PA, PE, MT, MG, SP, PR, SC
- Pseudoparmelia cyphellata **B** – CE, MT
- Pseudoparmelia harrisiana **B** – PE, GO, MG
- Pseudoparmelia hypomilta – MA, PE, AL, SE, MT, MG
- Pseudoparmelia kalbiana **B** – MA, MT, MS, GO
- Pseudoparmelia regnellii **B** – MT, MS, GO, MG
- Pseudoparmelia uleana **B** – AC, PA, MA, AL, SE, BA, MT, MS, MG, ES, RJ, SP, SC, RS
- Pseudopyrenula americana – AM, PE, BA
- Pseudopyrenula cerei **B** – PB, RJ, SC
- Pseudopyrenula connexa **B** – AM
- Pseudopyrenula diluta – AC, AM, MA, AL, SE, MT, MG, ES, RJ, SP, PR, SC, RS
- Pseudopyrenula dubia – SC
- Pseudopyrenula endoxanthoides – SE
- Pseudopyrenula flavoreagens **B** – AM, RO, MT, MG
- Pseudopyrenula gelatinosa **B** – BA, MG
- Pseudopyrenula guianensis – MT
- Pseudopyrenula media – AL, BA, MT, SC
- Pseudopyrenula miniflavida **B** – SE
- Pseudopyrenula muriformis **B** – SP
- Pseudopyrenula saxicola **B** – MT, MG
- Pseudopyrenula subgregaria – AC, AM, RO, MA, PB, AL, SE, BA, MT, MG, ES, RS
- Pseudopyrenula subnudata **B** – AM, RO, TO, MA, PE, AL, SE, BA, MG, RJ, SP, RS
- Pseudopyrenula superans – MS
- Pseudotopeliopsis scabiocarpa – RO
- Pseudotopeliopsis scabiomarginata – SE
- Psilolechia lucida – RJ
- Psora icterica – RS
- Psorinia cyanea **B** – MT
- Psoroglaena costaricensis – MG, SP
- Psoroglaena cubensis – AP, MS, SP, SC, RS
- Psoroglaena epiphylla – SP
- Psoroglaena ornata – MT
- Psoroglaena stigonemoides – PE, RS
- Psorotheciopsis albomaculans **B** – AM, PE, MT, SP, SC
- Psorotheciopsis patellarioides **B** – PE, RJ, SP, RS
- Psorotheciopsis philippinensis – SE, SC, RS
- Psorotheciopsis premneella **B** – PA, PE, SP
- Psorotichia americana – CE, RN, SE, MS
- Psorotichia murorum – PE, MS, SC
- Psorotichia polyspora – RR
- Psorotichia schaereri – MS
- Psorula rufonigra – RS
- Pterygiopsis atra **B** – RR, AL, SE, BA, MT, MS, MG, ES, RJ, SP, RS
- Pterygiopsis densisidiata **B** – AM, MA, AL
- Pterygiopsis guyanensis – AM, AL, SE, BA, MT, MS, ES
- Puiggariella hypothelia – State unknown
- Puiggariella nemathora – AC, AM, RO, PA, CE, PB, PE, AL, SE, BA, MT, MS, MG, ES, RJ, SP, SC, RS
- Punctelia borrerina **B** – MG, ES, SP, PR, RS
- Punctelia canaliculata **B** – RS
- Punctelia colombiana – MG, ES, SP, RS
- Punctelia constantimontium – MS, PR, SC, RS
- Punctelia crispa **B** – SP, RS
- Punctelia dictyoidea **B** – RJ, RS
- Punctelia digitata **B** – SP
- Punctelia fimbriata **B** – ES, RS
- Punctelia hypoleucites – MS, MG, SP, RS
- Punctelia imbricata **B** – SP
- Punctelia involuta **B** – MG, SP
- Punctelia jujuensis – MG, SP
- Punctelia marcellii **B** – SP
- Punctelia microsticta **B** – RJ, SP, PR, SC, RS
- Punctelia missouriensis – MS, SP
- Punctelia osorioi **B** – ES, RS
- Punctelia punctilla – SP
- Punctelia purpurascens **B** – RS
- Punctelia riograndensis **B** – MS, MG, SP, PR, RS
- Punctelia roseola **B** – RJ, SP
- Punctelia ruderata – MG, RJ, SP
- Punctelia stictica – MG
- Punctelia subpraesignis – PR, RS
- Punctelia subrudecta – BA, SP, PR, RS
- Pycnothelia papillaria – RS
- Pycnotrema pycnoporellum – AM, SE
- Pyrenopsis brasiliensis **B** – RJ
- Pyrenopsis carassensis **B** – AM, AL, MG, SC, RS
- Pyrenopsis cylindrophora **B** – AM, MA, MG
- Pyrenopsis monilifera **B** – MA, MG
- Pyrenopsis olivacea **B** – AM, MA, SE, MG, RJ
- Pyrenopsis portoricensis – CE, MS
- Pyrenula abditicarpa **B** – SE
- Pyrenula acutalis – AP, GO, DF, PR, RS
- Pyrenula acutispora – AM, MA, RN, PE, SE, BA, MT, MS, SC, RS
- Pyrenula adacta – MT, MS, MG
- Pyrenula aggregata – AC, CE, PE, AL, SE, BA, MT, MS
- Pyrenula aggregataspistea **B** – AC, AM, RO, PA, AP, MA, RN, SE, BA, MT
- Pyrenula albonigra **B** – SE
- Pyrenula albothallina – AP
- Pyrenula anomala – AC, AM, RO, PA, AP, TO, MA, CE, RN, PB, PE, AL, SE, BA, MT, MS, ES, SP
- Pyrenula approximans – MT, RJ
- Pyrenula aptrootianum **B** – AM
- Pyrenula arthoniotheca – AM, RO, AP, CE, SE, BA
- Pyrenula aspistea – AC, RO, TO, CE, RN, PB, PE, AL, SE, BA, MT, MS, GO, MG, PR
- Pyrenula astroidea – PE, SE, BA
- Pyrenula atropurpurea **B** – AC, PA
- Pyrenula aurantiacorubra **B** – AP, SE
- Pyrenula aurantiothallina **B** – BA
- Pyrenula bahiana **B** – RN, PE, AL, SE, BA, MS, SP
- Pyrenula balia – AC, AM, AP, PE, SE, RJ
- Pyrenula biseptata **B** – PA, BA
- Pyrenula bispora **B** – RO
- Pyrenula breutelii – CE, PE
- Pyrenula brunnea – AM, TO, PB, PE, RS
- Pyrenula caracasana – RS
- Pyrenula castanea **B** – PA, MT, SP, RS
- Pyrenula cayennensis – AP, MT
- Pyrenula celaticarpa **B** – SE
- Pyrenula cerina – PI, RN, PB, PE, AL, SE, BA, MG, ES, RJ, SP, SC
- Pyrenula cinnabarina **B** – PE
- Pyrenula circumfiniens – AC, MA, RN, PB, PE, AL, BA, MS, SP, SC
- Pyrenula coccinea **B** – BA
- Pyrenula cocoes – BA
- Pyrenula complanata – AL, BA, SE
- Pyrenula confinis – RO, AP, CE, PB, PE, AL, SE, BA, MS
- Pyrenula cornutispora **B** – AM
- Pyrenula crassiuscula **B** – MT, MS, SP
- Pyrenula cruenta – RN, PB, AL, SE, BA, MT, MG, ES, RJ, RS
- Pyrenula cruentata – AL, ES
- Pyrenula cryptostoma – MT
- Pyrenula cryptothelia – AC, MS
- Pyrenula cubana – AC, TO, MT, MS, ES, SC
- Pyrenula cuyabensis **B** – SE, MT, MS, RS
- Pyrenula dermatodes – RN, AL, SP, SC
- Pyrenula diamantinensis **B** – BA
- Pyrenula dissimulans – CE, PE, MS, RS
- Pyrenula duplicans – PE, SE, MT, MS, MG, ES, SP, SC
- Pyrenula elliptica – RN
- Pyrenula erumpens – RS
- Pyrenula fetivica – PE, SE, MT, RJ, RS
- Pyrenula fusispora **B** – MA, MS
- Pyrenula fusoluminata **B** – MG
- Pyrenula gahavisukana – SE, MG
- Pyrenula globifera **B** – PA, MA, MT, MS, MG, SC
- Pyrenula guianensis – PE
- Pyrenula hoehneliana – RJ
- Pyrenula immissa – AL
- Pyrenula infraleucotrypa **B** – AC, AM, RO, AP, TO, MA, CE, PB, PE, AL, SE, BA, MT, MS
- Pyrenula inframamillana **B** – AC, AM, RO, AP, PB, PE, BA, MT, MS, GO, SP
- Pyrenula inspersaspistea **B** – RO
- Pyrenula inspersicollaris **B** – SE, BA
- Pyrenula laetior – AC, AM, RO, CE, PB, PE, MT, MS
- Pyrenula leptaleoides **B** – RO
- Pyrenula leucostoma – SE, MS, RJ, PR, RS
- Pyrenula leucotrypa – RO
- Pyrenula lilaceoreagens **B** – MS
- Pyrenula lilacina **B** – BA
- Pyrenula lineatostroma – AM, RO, TO, AL, BA, MT
- Pyrenula luteopruinosa – AL
- Pyrenula lyonii – SC
- Pyrenula mamillana – AC, AM, RO, PA, AP, TO, CE, RN, PB, PE, AL, SE, BA, MT, MS, GO, DF, MG, RJ, SP, PR, SC, RS
- Pyrenula massariospora – RO, AP, BA, PR, RS
- Pyrenula mastophora – BA, MS, MG, RJ, SP, SC, RS
- Pyrenula mastophoroides – AL
- Pyrenula mattickiana **B** – RJ
- Pyrenula media – MT
- Pyrenula micheneri – RO, MS
- Pyrenula microcarpa – BA, MS, PR
- Pyrenula micromma – AC, PE, AL
- Pyrenula microtheca – AP, RN, AL, SE, SC
- Pyrenula minarum **B** – MG, RS
- Pyrenula minor – AC, AM, RO, AP, CE, SE, BA, MT, SP
- Pyrenula minutispora **B** – AM, RO
- Pyrenula monospora – AM, SP, PR
- Pyrenula montagnei – SP
- Pyrenula montocensis – ES, SP, RS
- Pyrenula musaespora **B** – SE
- Pyrenula neosandwicensis – SP, PR
- Pyrenula nitidula – RO, PA, CE, PE, AL, SE, RJ, SC
- Pyrenula obvoluta – AM
- Pyrenula ochraceoflava – MA, PI, CE, RN, PE, AL, SE, BA, ES, RJ
- Pyrenula oleosa – ES
- Pyrenula papillifera – SE, BA, MS, RJ, RS
- Pyrenula papilligera **B** – MT, SP
- Pyrenula paraminarum **B** – RO, MT
- Pyrenula parvinuclea – PI, CE, PB, PE, BA
- Pyrenula platystoma – RN, MG, SP, RS
- Pyrenula pleiomera – CE
- Pyrenula praelucida – PE
- Pyrenula prorecta **B** – MG
- Pyrenula pseudobufonia – MT
- Pyrenula psoriformis – RO, BA, MS, SC
- Pyrenula punctella – MS, MG, RJ
- Pyrenula pyrenuloides – AM, PB, PE, AL, SE, MS, SP, SC, RS
- Pyrenula quartzitica **B** – MG
- Pyrenula quassiicola – AC, TO, CE, RN, PB, PE, AL, SE, BA, MT, MS, GO, DF, MG, RJ, SP, PR
- Pyrenula ravenelii – MT, MS
- Pyrenula reginae **B** – PE
- Pyrenula rhomboidea **B** – RO
- Pyrenula rubroacutispora **B** – MS
- Pyrenula rubrolateralis **B** – SE, BA
- Pyrenula rubromamillana **B** – AM, PE, AL, BA, MT, MS
- Pyrenula rubronitidula **B** – AM, RO, AP
- Pyrenula rubrostigma **B** – RO, PA, AL, SE, BA, MS
- Pyrenula salmonea **B** – BA
- Pyrenula sanguinea **B** – RO
- Pyrenula sanguineoastroidea **B** – BA
- Pyrenula schiffneri – MT, MS, SC
- Pyrenula septicollaris **B** – AC, AP, PB, PE, AL, SE, BA, MT, MS, MG, ES, SC
- Pyrenula sexlocularis – BA
- Pyrenula spissitunicata **B** – SE
- Pyrenula subducta – RO, PE, MT, MS, GO, MG
- Pyrenula subglabrata – PB
- Pyrenula subgregantula – SE, MS, MG
- Pyrenula sublaevigata – PE, BA, MS
- Pyrenula subpraelucida **B** – AP
- Pyrenula supralaetior **B** – BA
- Pyrenula thelomorpha – PI, CE, AL, MS
- Pyrenula tristissima – SE
- Pyrenula vernicosa – MT, SP
- Pyrenula violaceoastroidea **B** – PB, BA
- Pyrenula viridipyrgilla **B** – RO
- Pyrenula wheeleri – PE
- Pyrenula xanthinspersa **B** – AM
- Pyrenula xanthoglobulifera **B** – CE, MS
- Pyrgidium montellicum – RO, RJ, SP
- Pyrgillus aurantiacus **B** – TO
- Pyrgillus indicus – AC
- Pyrgillus javanicus – AM, AL, SE, BA, MT, MG, SP
- Pyrgillus rufus **B** – PA
- Pyrrhospora palmicola – SE, MT
- Pyrrhospora quernea – SE
- Pyrrhospora varians – SE, MS, RS
- Pyxine albovirens – PE, AL, SE, BA, MS, MG, ES, RJ, SP, PR, SC, RS
- Pyxine astipitata **B** – MS, SP
- Pyxine astridiana **B** – SP
- Pyxine berteriana – PA, PB, PE, AL, SE, MT, MS, GO, MG, ES, RJ, SP, PR, RS
- Pyxine caesiopruinosa – SE, MG, ES, SP, SC, RS
- Pyxine coccifera – PA, MA, MT, MS
- Pyxine cocoes – AM, RO, TO, AP, PI, CE, RN, PB, PE, SE, BA, MT, MS, MG, ES, RJ, SP, SC, RS
- Pyxine cognata – SE, MT, MS, GO, ES, SP, RS
- Pyxine convexior – SC
- Pyxine coralligera **B** – AC, AM, PA, PE, BA, MT, MS, GO, MG, SP, PR, SC, RS
- Pyxine daedalea – MA, PI, MT, MS, DF, MG, ES, SP, PR, SC, RS
- Pyxine endolutea – CE, SE, BA, MG
- Pyxine eschweileri – AC, TO, CE, AL, SE, DF, MT, MS, GO, MG, SP, PR, RS
- Pyxine exoalbida **B** – MS, SP
- Pyxine fallax – MT, MS, SP, RS
- Pyxine jolyana **B** – MG, SP
- Pyxine katendei – GO, SP, SC, RS
- Pyxine mantiqueirensis **B** – PE, MS, MG, SP
- Pyxine microspora – CE, MT, SC, RS
- Pyxine nana **B** – MS, SP
- Pyxine obscurascens **B** – MA, PE, SE, BA, MT, MS, MG, SP, PR
- Pyxine petricola – CE, PB, BA, MT, MS, MG, ES, SP, RS
- Pyxine physciiformis **B** – MT, MS, DF, SP, RS
- Pyxine primaria **B** – MT, MS, SC
- Pyxine pungens – PA, BA, MT, MS, DF, MG, SP
- Pyxine pustulata **B** – MS, SP
- Pyxine pyxinoides **B** – CE, MT, MS, RJ, SP, SC, RS
- Pyxine retirugella – AC, MA, MG
- Pyxine rhizophorae **B** – RJ, SP, SC, RS
- Pyxine rhodesiaca – MT, MS, DF, SP
- Pyxine schechingeri **B** – BA, MT, MS, GO, MG
- Pyxine simulans **B** – PE, MS, SP
- Pyxine subcinerea – RN, PE, AL, SE, BA, MT, MS, GO, DF, MG, ES, RJ, SP, RS

== R ==
- Raciborskiella janeirensis **B** – AM, RO, PA, PE, BA, MT, MS, RJ, SP, SC
- Racoleus trichophorus – BA, MT
- Racoplaca maculata **B** – AM, PE, SE, MG, RJ, SP, RS
- Racoplaca melanobapha – AC, AM, RO, PA, PE, AL, BA, MT, ES, SP, PR, SC, RS
- Racoplaca subtilissima – AM, PA, PB, PE, BA, RJ, SP, RS
- Racoplaca tremens **B** – SP
- Ramalea coilophylla – ES, SP, RS
- Ramalina anceps – ES, RJ, SP, PR, SC, RS
- Ramalina asahinae – MG, SP, SC
- Ramalina aspera – PE, AL, SE, BA, MS, MG, RJ, SP, SC, RS
- Ramalina calcarata – MG, ES, SP, PR, RS
- Ramalina camptospora – MG, ES, RJ, SP, PR, SC, RS
- Ramalina canalicularis – PR
- Ramalina celastri – PE, MT, MS, GO, MG, ES, SP, PR, SC, RS
- Ramalina cochlearis **B** – AL, SE, BA, ES, RS
- Ramalina complanata – PE, SE, BA, MS, MG, ES, RJ, SP, PR, SC, RS
- Ramalina continentalis **B** – MT, MS, RS
- Ramalina dendriscoides – PE, AL, RJ, SP, PR, SC, RS
- Ramalina dendroides – MG, RJ, SP, PR, SC
- Ramalina exiguella – SC
- Ramalina fleigiae **B** – RS
- Ramalina gallowayi – MG
- Ramalina gracilis **B** – PB, BA, DF, MG, ES, RJ, SP, PR, SC, RS
- Ramalina grumosa – MG, SP, RS
- Ramalina lacera – RS
- Ramalina laevigata – BA, MT, SC, RS
- Ramalina peruviana – PE, AL, SE, BA, MS, MG, ES, RJ, SP, PR, SC, RS
- Ramalina prolifera – SP, PR, SC, RS
- Ramalina puiggarii **B** – MG, RJ, SP, SC, RS
- Ramalina pusiola – BA, MG, ES, RJ, SP, PR, SC, RS
- Ramalina rectangularis **B** – BA
- Ramalina rigida – RJ, PR
- Ramalina sorediosa – PE, AL, SE, BA, ES, RJ, SP, PR, SC
- Ramalina sprengelii – RR, MG, SP, PR, SC, RS
- Ramalina subpollinaria – PE, SE, RJ, SP, SC
- Ramalina usnea – PE, AL, BA, ES, RJ, SP, PR, SC, RS
- Ramboldia blochiana **B** – BA, SP, SC
- Ramboldia haematites **B** – AM, RO, MA, CE, PB, PE, AL, SE, BA, ES, RJ, SP, SC, RS
- Ramboldia heterocarpa **B** – PE, MT, MG, RJ, SP, SC, RS
- Ramboldia russula – PA, CE, PE, AL, SE, BA, MT, MS, GO, DF, MG, RJ, SP, SC, RS
- Ramonia cupellina – CE, SP
- Ramonia intermedia **B** – PB, MS, MG, SP
- Ramonia kandleri **B** – MA, RN, PE, AL, MS
- Ramonia longispora **B** – SC
- Ramonia malmei **B** – RN, SP, RS
- Ramonia microspora **B** – PB, SE, MS, ES, SP, RS
- Ramonia valenzueliana – MA, MS, RS
- Ramonia variespora **B** – TO, PE
- Ramonia xylophila **B** – MS
- Redingeria glaucoglyphica – AM, AP, ES
- Redingeria glyphica – AM, RJ, SP
- Redingeria krempelhuberi **B** – MT, MG, RJ, SP
- Redingeria leiostoma – MT, MG, SP
- Redingeria microspora **B** – AC, PA, AP, MT, RJ
- Redingeria uniseptata **B** – MT
- Reimnitzia santensis – AL, MT, MS, MG, SP, RS
- Relicina abstrusa – RO, PA, AP, TO, MA, PE, AL, SE, BA, MT, MS, MG, ES, RJ, SP, PR, SC, RS
- Relicina incongrua – BA, MT
- Relicina relicinella – AM, PA
- Relicina subabstrusa – AM, PA, TO, MA, CE, PE, MT, MG, RS
- Relicina xanthoparmeliiformis **B** – MG
- Remototrachyna consimilis **B** – GO, MG, RJ, SP, RS
- Remototrachyna costaricensis – PA, MT, GO, MG, RJ, SP, PR, SC, RS
- Remototrachyna rhabdiformis – SE, MG, RJ, SP
- Rhabdodiscus anamorphoides **B** – AC, AM, RR, RJ, SC
- Rhabdodiscus auberianus – AM, RO, RR, PA, PE, SE, BA, MG, RJ, SP, PR
- Rhabdodiscus crassoides **B** – RO
- Rhabdodiscus emersellus **B** – SE, BA, SP
- Rhabdodiscus emersus **B** – BA, RJ, SP
- Rhabdodiscus fissus – RJ, SP
- Rhabdodiscus granulosus – MG, ES, RJ, SP
- Rhabdodiscus inspersus **B** – RO
- Rhabdodiscus isidiifer – AM, RO
- Rhabdodiscus jamaicanus – SE, BA
- Rhabdodiscus lankaensis – AM
- Rhabdodiscus latilaber – AM
- Rhabdodiscus lineatus **B** – PA
- Rhabdodiscus metaphoricus – MT, MG, RJ, SP
- Rhabdodiscus planus **B** – RO
- Rhabdodiscus reconditus **B** – AM, RO, MT, RJ, SP
- Rhabdodiscus schizostomus – MG
- Rhabdodiscus subcavatus – RO, PA, MT
- Rhabdodiscus subemersus – AM, RO, PA, RN, AL, SE, BA, SP
- Rhizocarpon geographicum – RJ
- Rhizocarpon megapotamicum **B** – RJ, SP, PR, RS
- Rhizocarpon sipmanianum **B** – RJ, RS
- Rhizocarpon sorediosubmuriforme **B** – RJ
- Ricasolia adscripta – RJ
- Ricasolia glaberrima – MG, RJ, SP, PR, SC, RS
- Ricasolia intermedia – RS
- Rinodina atrocinerea – RJ, SC
- Rinodina atroumbrina **B** – MG
- Rinodina australis **B** – SP
- Rinodina brasiliensis **B** – RJ, SP
- Rinodina colobinoides – MS
- Rinodina colorans **B** – SP, SC, RS
- Rinodina connectens **B** – RS
- Rinodina conradii – RS
- Rinodina conspersa **B** – MT, MS, RS
- Rinodina deminuta **B** – MT, RS
- Rinodina densisidiata **B** – MT
- Rinodina disjuncta – SE
- Rinodina dispersa **B** – MS
- Rinodina dolichospora **B** – MT, RJ, SP, RS
- Rinodina ferruginosa **B** – MG
- Rinodina griseosquamosa **B** – RJ, RS
- Rinodina guianensis – PE, BA, MS, GO, MG
- Rinodina gyalectoides **B** – MT
- Rinodina homobola – RS
- Rinodina homoboloides **B** – RJ
- Rinodina hypomelaenoides **B** – MG
- Rinodina intrusa **B** – MT, MS, RJ, SC, RS
- Rinodina lepida – MT, MS, MG, SP
- Rinodina maculans – CE, PE, SE, MS, SP, SC, RS
- Rinodina malmeana **B** – RS
- Rinodina megapotamica **B** – MT, MS, RS
- Rinodina melanotropa **B** – RJ
- Rinodina mniaroea – MG
- Rinodina oleae – SC
- Rinodina ornata **B** – SP
- Rinodina oxydata – SE, MS, SP, SC, RS
- Rinodina parasitica – MG
- Rinodina placynthielloides – BA
- Rinodina pyrenodesmoides **B** – SP
- Rinodina pyxinoides – MG
- Rinodina regnelli **B** – ES, RS
- Rinodina saulensis – MS
- Rinodina sipmanii – CE, PE, AL, SE, MS, ES, SC
- Rinodina steineri **B** – SP
- Rinodina subsororia **B** – RJ
- Rinodina subtilis **B** – SP
- Rinodina teichophila – MS
- Rinodina theioplacoides **B** – RJ
- Rinodina viridis **B** – SP
- Roccellina leptothalla **B** – PE, SE, RJ
- Roccellographa circumscripta – BA, SC
- Rolueckia aggregata – AM
- Rolueckia conspersa **B** – AM, RO, PA, AP, PE, MT, MG, SP, SC
- Roselviria purulhensis – SE, BA, SP, PR
- Rostania callibotrys – PE, SP, RS
- Rubrotricha subhelminthospora – AM, PA, AP, BA

== S ==
- Sagenidiopsis undulata – AM, RO, AP, PE, AL, SE, BA, MT, GO, MG, ES, RJ
- Sanguinotrema wightii – AP, SE, BA, MT, MS, MG, SP, PR, RS
- Santricharia farinosa **B** – PE, BA, RJ, SP, PR, RS
- Sarcographa atlantica **B** – PE
- Sarcographa aurantiaca **B** – SP
- Sarcographa cinchonarum – TO, MA, MT, MS
- Sarcographa convexa **B** – RJ
- Sarcographa cuyabensis **B** – MT
- Sarcographa dilatata **B** – SC
- Sarcographa feei – SP
- Sarcographa fenicis – CE, AL, BA, MS
- Sarcographa fissurinoides **B** – CE, AL, BA
- Sarcographa heteroclita – PA, AP, BA
- Sarcographa labyrinthica – AC, AM, RO, PA, AP, PB, PE, AL, SE, BA, MS, SC
- Sarcographa meduselloides – State unknown
- Sarcographa medusulina – SE, BA, MS
- Sarcographa megistocarpa – PA
- Sarcographa ramificans – PE, BA
- Sarcographa stramineoalbida **B** – BA
- Sarcographa subtricosa – MT
- Sarcographa tricosa – AC, MA, CE, RN, PE, AL, SE, BA, MS, MG, ES, RJ, PR
- Sarcogyne hypophaea – SP
- Sarcogyne privigna – SC
- Sarcogyne terrena **B** – RS
- Sarcopyrenia cylindrospora – SE
- Saxiloba pruinosa **B** – MT
- Schadonia subobscurata **B** – MT, MG, SP, SC
- Schaereria cinereorufa – RJ
- Schismatomma graphidioides – SP
- Schistophoron indicum – MS
- Schistophoron tenue – MS
- Schizotrema zebrinum – AM
- Sclerophora sanguinea – SP
- Sclerophyton elegans **B** – AC, AM, PA, PB, PE, AL, SE, MT, SP
- Sclerophyton extenuatum – BA
- Sclerophyton fluorescens – AM, SE, MT
- Sclerophyton muriforme – PE
- Sclerophyton perithecioideum **B** – AM, PA
- Sclerophyton seriale – SE, BA
- Sclerophyton stigmaticum – SP, PR
- Scoliciosporum camptosporum **B** – MT, MS, MG, ES, RJ, SP, SC, RS
- Scoliciosporum intrusum – BA, MT, RJ, SP, SC
- Scoliciosporum umbrinum – BA, SC
- Sculptolumina japonica – BA, MT, MS, MG, RJ, SP, RS
- Sculptolumina serotina **B** – PI, PE, BA, MT, MS, MG, ES
- Scytinium californicum – AL, MG, ES
- Scytinium fragrans – PE
- Scytinium gelatinosum – RJ, SP
- Septotrapelia glauca – MT, MS, MG, ES, SP, SC
- Septotrapelia triseptata – MS
- Septotrapelia usnica – BA, MT, MS, MG, ES, SP, PR, SC, RS
- Siphula carassana **B** – MG
- Siphula decumbens – BA, MG
- Siphula fastigiata – BA, MG
- Siphula pteruloides – MG
- Sipmanidea neotropica – AM, PA, BA, MT, RJ, SP
- Sphaerophoropsis stereocauloides **B** – MG, RJ, SP, SC
- Spilonema paradoxum – MT, MS
- Spinomyces aggregatus – BA
- Spinomyces albostrigosus – PE, BA, ES, RS
- Sporocybomyces leucomuralis **B** – PB, AL, SE, SP
- Sporocybomyces leucotrichoides – RO, PA, AP, PB, PE, AL, SE, BA, MT, MS, ES, RJ, SP, PR, SC, RS
- Sporopodium aeruginescens – RO
- Sporopodium antonionanum – AM, RO, PA, PE, SE, SP
- Sporopodium aurantiacum **B** – PE, SP
- Sporopodium citrinum – AM, PA, PE, BA, MT, SP
- Sporopodium leprieurii – AC, AM, PA, PE, AL, BA, MT, ES, SP, PR, RS
- Sporopodium marginatum – SE
- Sporopodium phyllocharis – AC, PA, PB, PE, SE, BA, SP, SC, RS
- Sporopodium pilocarpoides **B** – SP
- Sporopodium soredioflavescens **B** – MT, SP
- Sporopodium subflavescens – SE, SP
- Sporopodium xantholeucum **B** – AM, RO, PE, AL, SP, PR, RS
- Sprucidea granulosa **B** – AM, RO, AL, BA, MG, SP
- Sprucidea gymnopiperis **B** – AM, RO, AL, BA, MG, SP
- Sprucidea penicillata **B** – AC, AM, PE, AL, MT
- Sprucidea rubropenicillata **B** – AM, RO
- Sprucidea squamulosa **B** – AM
- Squamulea muelleri **B** – RJ, RS
- Staurolemma lineare **B** – AL
- Staurothele arenaria – MA
- Staurothele pachystroma **B** – SP
- Stegobolus actinotus – AC, AM, MT
- Stegobolus amazonus **B** – RO
- Stegobolus anamorphus – AC, AM, RO, PA, PE, AL, SE, MT, MS, MG
- Stegobolus berkeleyanus – AC, AM, RO, PA, ES
- Stegobolus columellatus – SP
- Stegobolus guianensis – AM, RO, PA, SP
- Stegobolus montagnei – AM
- Stegobolus negativus **B** – AM
- Stegobolus radians **B** – AM, RO, SE, BA, MT, MG, RJ, SP
- Stegobolus schizostomus – AM, MT, ES, RJ, SP
- Stegobolus subwrightii – MG
- Stegobolus trachodes – RO, RJ
- Stegobolus wrightii – PA, AL, SE, MT
- Stenocybe tropica **B** – SP
- Stereocaulon microcarpum **B** – MG, ES, RJ, SP, PR, SC, RS
- Stereocaulon pileatum – MG
- Stereocaulon ramulosum – MG, ES, RJ, PR, SC, RS
- Stereocaulon strictum – RJ, SP
- Stereocaulon vesuvianum – MG
- Sticta andina – MG, RJ
- Sticta aemulans **B** – SP
- Sticta aongstroemii **B** – ES, SP, SC
- Sticta cerradensis **B** – MS
- Sticta dactyloticarpa **B** – RJ
- Sticta diluta **B** – RJ
- Sticta fuliginosa – MG, SP, RJ, PR, SC, RS
- Sticta glomeruligera – RJ
- Sticta laevis – MG
- Sticta leucoblephara **B** – SC
- Sticta lherminieri – PA
- Sticta maculofuliginosa – RS
- Sticta megapotamica **B** – RS
- Sticta papyracea – PR
- Sticta paulensis **B** – SP
- Sticta peruviana – MT, MG, SC, RS
- Sticta porella **B** – MS
- Sticta scabrosa – PA, PE, SE, BA, MT, MS, MG, ES, RJ, SP, PR, SC, RS
- Sticta sublaciniata **B** – RJ, PR, SC, RS
- Sticta subsinuosa **B** – RJ
- Sticta tomentella – SP, SC
- Sticta weigelii – MG, PA, SC, RS
- Sticta xanthotropa **B** – AL, RJ, PR, RS
- Stictis urceolata – SE
- Stigmatochroma adauctum **B** – MT, MS
- Stigmatochroma epiflavium **B** – MS, SP
- Stigmatochroma epimartum – TO, CE, RN, AL, MT, MS, MG, SP
- Stigmatochroma gerontoides – TO, PI, CE, RN, PE, AL, SE, BA, MT, MS, RJ, SP, SC
- Stigmatochroma glaucothecum – MT
- Stigmatochroma kryptoviolascens **B** – MT, MS, GO, MG, SP
- Stigmatochroma metaleptodes – RR, MA, CE, PE, AL, BA, MT, MS, MG, ES, SP
- Stigmidium marinum – SC
- Stirtonia amazonica **B** – PA (provisionally accepted)
- Stirtonia curvata – RJ
- Stirtonia ibirapuitensis **B** – SE, RS
- Stirtonia juaensis **B** – BA
- Stirtonia lucida **B** – CE, MS
- Stirtonia macrocarpa **B** – RO, CE, SE, MT, MS, SC
- Stirtonia microspora **B** – CE, PB, MS
- Stirtonia neotropica – RO
- Stirtonia nitida **B** – AC, AP, PB, SE, RS
- Stirtonia nivea **B** – AM, PB, BA, MS
- Stirtonia obvallata – SE
- Stirtonia ochracea **B** – CE, SE
- Stirtonia psoromica – PE, MS
- Stirtonia soaresi **B** – PE
- Stirtonia viridis – MS
- Strigula antillarum – AM, PB, PE, SE, MS, SP, RS
- Strigula concreta – PA, CE, PB, PE, SE, MT, MS, RJ, SP, SC
- Strigula macrocarpa – AM, RO
- Strigula microspora – CE, PE, SE, BA, SP
- Strigula nitidula – AC, AM, RO, PA, PB, PE, SE, BA, MS, MG, ES, RJ, SP, RS
- Strigula prasina **B** – AM, PE, AL, BA, MS, SP
- Strigula schizospora – AM, PA, CE, PE, SE, BA, ES, SP, SC, RS
- Strigula smaragdula – AC, AM, RO, PA, PB, PE, AL, SE, BA, MT, MS, MG, ES, RJ, SP, PR, SC, RS
- Strigula subelegans – RO, CE, PE, RS
- Stromatella bermudana – PE
- Sulcopyrenula canellae-albae – PA
- Sulcopyrenula cruciata **B** – MG
- Sulzbacheromyces caatingae **B** – PI, CE, PB, PE, SE, MS
- Sulzbacheromyces leucodontius – AC
- Sulzbacheromyces neofossicola **B** – AM, RO, PE, RJ
- Swinscowia affinis – MS
- Swinscowia amphora – MS
- Swinscowia decipiens **B** – RS
- Swinscowia griseonitens – SE
- Swinscowia muriconidiata – MS, RS
- Swinscowia obtecta **B** – PE, MG, RJ, RS
- Swinscowia stigmatella – PE, AL
- Synalissa mattogrossensis **B** – CE, AL, SE, MT, MS, RS
- Synarthonia ferruginea **B** – PE, SE, MG, RJ
- Synarthonia inconspicua – AM, RO, PE, AL, SE, BA, MT, MS
- Synarthonia josephiana – AM
- Synarthonia lopingensis – AL, MS
- Synarthonia pilosella – AM, AL, BA
- Synarthonia sarcographoides **B** – CE, PE, MS, DF, PR
- Synarthonia xanthonica **B** – MT
- Synarthonia xanthosarcographoides **B** – AM, MT, MS, GO
- Synarthothelium cerebriforme – AM, PA, TO, RN, MT, MS
- Syncesia albiseda – SE
- Syncesia byssina **B** – MG, SP
- Syncesia byssolomoides **B** – CE, PE, SE, BA
- Syncesia decussans – MG, SP
- Syncesia depressa – PE
- Syncesia effusa – AL, BA, SP
- Syncesia farinacea – SE, BA, MG, RJ, SP
- Syncesia glyphysoides – BA
- Syncesia graphica – RJ, SP
- Syncesia leprobola – SE, RJ
- Syncesia rhizomorpha **B** – PE, AL, SE, BA, MG, ES, SP, PR, SC
- Syncesia sulphurea **B** – MG

== T ==
- Tapellaria bilimbioides – PB, PE, PR
- Tapellaria corticola **B** – SP, SC
- Tapellaria epiphylla **B** – PA, CE, PE, SE, BA, MT, MG, SP, SC, RS
- Tapellaria leonorae **B** – PE
- Tapellaria malmei **B** – PA, PE, SE, MT, RS
- Tapellaria molleri – PE, SE, SP, PR, SC, RS
- Tapellaria nana **B** – PA, CE, PB, PE, AL, SE, BA, MG, RJ, SP, SC, RS
- Tapellaria nigrata **B** – PE, MT, MG, RJ, SP, SC
- Tapellaria phyllophila – PE, RJ, SP, SC, RS
- Tapellaria puiggarii **B** – RO, PA, PE, BA, SP
- Tapellaria saxicola – MG, ES
- Tapellaria schindleri – MT
- Tapellariopsis octomera – PE, PR
- Teloschistes chrysophthalmus – RJ, SP, PR, SC, RS
- Teloschistes cymbalifer **B** – RS
- Teloschistes exilis – PE, AL, MS, MG, ES, RJ, PR, SC, RS
- Teloschistes flavicans – PA, PB, PE, AL, SE, BA, MS, MG, ES, RJ, SP, PR, SC, RS
- Tephromela alectoronica – BA, MT, MS, GO, MG, RJ, RS
- Tephromela americana – MT, MG, RJ, SP, RS
- Tephromela atra – PA, BA, MT, MS, MG, ES, RJ, SP, PR, SC, RS
- Tephromela buelliana **B** – MG, RJ
- Tephromela campestricola – SC
- Tephromela carassensis **B** – MG
- Tephromela colensoica – BA, RJ, SC
- Tephromela epichlorina **B** – MG
- Tephromela immersa **B** – BA, SP, RS
- Tephromela mattogrossensis **B** – AL, MS, MG, RJ, SC, RS
- Tephromela multireflexa **B** – MT
- Tephromela obesimarginata **B** – MG
- Tephromela rhizophorae **B** – SP
- Tephromela velloziae **B** – BA
- Tephromela vinacea **B** – PE, MS
- Tephromela xanthonica – MG
- Tetramelas regiomontanus – RJ
- Thalloidima ioen – MS
- Thalloidima massatum – MA, CE, RS
- Thalloloma anguinum – RO, MS, PR
- Thalloloma astroideum – RO, PB, PE, AL, SE, BA, MT
- Thalloloma buriticum **B** – PB, BA, MT
- Thalloloma cinnabarinum – PA, PB, PE, SE, MS, MG, RS
- Thalloloma halonatum **B** – MT
- Thalloloma hypoleptum – AM, SE, BA, MG, ES, RJ, SP, PR, RS
- Thalloloma janeirense **B** – SE, BA, RJ
- Thalloloma pontalense **B** – PR, RS
- Thalloloma rhodastrum **B** – AP, TO, SE, BA, SC, RS
- Thalloloma scribillans – AM, BA, MG
- Thalloloma uniseptatum **B** – MT
- Thalloloma xanthohypoleptum **B** – ES
- Thecaria quassiicola – SP, SC
- Thecographa prosiliens – SP
- Thelenella brasiliensis **B** – CE, BA, MT, MS, ES, SP, SC
- Thelenella lateralis **B** – SE
- Thelenella luridella – AL, SE, BA, MT, MS, MG, RJ, PR, SC, RS
- Thelenella monospora **B** – AP
- Thelenella paraguayensis – AL, SE, MS, RS
- Thelidium brasiliense **B** – MT, MS, SP, RS
- Thelidium methorium – MG
- Thelidium minutulum – MS, SP, SC
- Thelidium mucosoides **B** – SP
- Thelocarpon epibolum – ES
- Thelocarpon triseptatum **B** – AP
- Thelopsis cruciata **B** – SE
- Thelopsis flavosorediata **B** – MS, SC
- Thelopsis rubella – PE
- Thelopsis spinulosa **B** – MS
- Thelotrema adjectum – AM, AP
- Thelotrema defectum – PB
- Thelotrema defossum – CE, PB
- Thelotrema diplotrema – SE
- Thelotrema lacteum – MG, SP
- Thelotrema lepadinum – SC, RS
- Thelotrema lepadodes – BA, ES, SP, SC
- Thelotrema marginatum **B** – PA (provisionally accepted)
- Thelotrema pachysporoides **B** – SE
- Thelotrema pachysporum – SE, SP
- Thelotrema polythecium – CE
- Thelotrema santense – MT
- Thelotrema saxicola **B** – MG
- Thelotrema sitianum **B** – MG
- Thelotrema subtile – AM, PB, SE
- Thelotrema suecicum – AM
- Thelotrema viride **B** – PA (provisionally accepted)
- Thelotrema wilsoniorum – AP
- Thermutis velutina – PE
- Thyrea confusa – MS
- Thyrea pachyphylla – ES
- Thyrea porphyrella **B** – ES
- Thyrea pulverulenta **B** – MS
- Tingiopsidium tropicum **B** – MG
- Tomasellia acumulata **B** – PA (provisionally accepted)
- Tomasellia brasiliensis **B** – RJ (provisionally accepted)
- Toninia cinereovirens – MT, RS
- Toninia himalayana – MT
- Toninia mesoidea – MS
- Toninia submexicana – MS
- Toninia tristis – RS
- Topelia tetraspora **B** – SE
- Trapelia coarctata – CE, AL, SE, MT, MG, RJ, SP, SC, RS
- Trapelia glebulosa – AL, SE, RS
- Trapelia placodioides – SC
- Trapeliopsis flexuosa – AL, SE, MS, MG, ES, SP, PR, SC, RS
- Trapeliopsis glaucoplaca **B** – MG
- Trapeliopsis granulosa – SE, MS, MG, RJ, SC, RS
- Trapeliopsis pseudogranulosa – MT
- Trapeliopsis studerae **B** – AL, MG, ES
- Traponora asterella – TO, CE, RN, AL, SE, MT, MS, MG, RS
- Traponora fusca – MS
- Traponora globosa – MS, MG
- Tricharia amazonum – PB, PE, SE, BA, SP, RS
- Tricharia aulaxiniformis **B** – PE, BA, ES, SP
- Tricharia aulaxinoides **B** – PE, MG, SP, PR, RS
- Tricharia brevipilosa **B** – MT
- Tricharia carnea **B** – AM, PE, SE, BA, MT, MS, RJ, SP, SC, RS
- Tricharia fumosa **B** – MT
- Tricharia longispora **B** – AM, PA, AP, AL, SP
- Tricharia melanothrix – AC, AM, PA, SE, BA, MT, RJ
- Tricharia paraguayensis – PB, PE, SE, BA
- Tricharia pseudosantessonii – SP
- Tricharia subplana **B** – GO, SP
- Tricharia testacea **B** – SP
- Tricharia triseptata **B** – AM, RS
- Tricharia umbrosa **B** – SP
- Tricharia urceolata **B** – AC, RO, PB, PE, AL, SE, BA, MG, ES, SP, PR, RS
- Trichothelium africanum – PE
- Trichothelium ake-assii – MT
- Trichothelium alboatrum – RO, PB, BA, MS, PR
- Trichothelium angustisporum **B** – CE, PE, RS
- Trichothelium annulatum **B** – AM, PA, PE, MT, MG, SP, PR, SC, RS
- Trichothelium argenteum – AC, RO, PE, SE, MT, SP, PR, SC
- Trichothelium bipindense – AC, AM, RO, PA, PB, PE, BA, MT, SP, PR, SC, RS
- Trichothelium brasiliense **B** – AM, SP
- Trichothelium epiphyllum – AM, RO, PA, AP, PB, PE, AL, SE, BA, MT, MG, ES, RJ, SP, PR, SC, RS
- Trichothelium horridulum **B** – AM, RO, PE, BA, MT, MG, RJ, SP, PR, RS
- Trichothelium intermedium – AM, PE, BA
- Trichothelium juruense **B** – AM, PA, MT
- Trichothelium minus – PE, SE, MT, RJ, SP, SC
- Trichothelium minutum – AM, RO, PE, MT, SP, SC
- Trichothelium mirum – AM, PA, MT
- Trichothelium montanum – PE, MG, PR
- Trichothelium pallescens **B** – RO, PA, BA, RS
- Trichothelium pallidisetum – MT
- Trichothelium pauciseptatum – AC, SP
- Trichothelium porinoides – PE
- Trichothelium sipmanii – RO, PA, MA, PE, SE, MT, MS
- Trichothelium ulei – AM, RO, PA, PE, SE, BA, MT, SP, SC
- Trimmatothele perquisita – MS
- Trinathotrema stictideum – AC, AL
- Trypetheliopsis epiphylla – PE
- Trypetheliopsis gigas – SE
- Trypetheliopsis kalbii – AM, PE
- Trypethelium astroideum – AP, PB, BA
- Trypethelium aureornatum **B** – MS
- Trypethelium eluteriae – AC, AM, RO, PA, AP, TO, MA, CE, RN, PB, PE, AL, SE, BA, MT, MS, GO, MG, RJ, SC
- Trypethelium endoflavum **B** – MS
- Trypethelium foveolatum **B** – AP, TO, SE, MT, MS, RJ
- Trypethelium krempelhuberi – AM, PB, BA, MT, MS
- Trypethelium luteolucidum **B** – RO, SE, MS, PR
- Trypethelium muriforme **B** – MS
- Trypethelium ornatum – MS
- Trypethelium platystomum – AC, AM, RO, PA, AP, TO, MA, SE, BA, MT, MS, ES
- Trypethelium regnellii **B** – SE, MT, MS
- Trypethelium subeluteriae – AC, PA, TO, MA, CE, PB, PE, AL, SE, BA, MT, MS, GO
- Trypethelium tolimense – MT, MS
- Trypethelium xanthoplatystomum – MS
- Trypethelium xanthostiolornatum **B** – MS
- Tylophoron hibernicum – AC, AM, AL, SE, BA, MT, MS, ES, SP, PR, SC
- Tylophoron moderatum – AC, AM, PE, AL, SE, MT, MS, GO, MG, ES, SP, PR
- Tylophoron protrudens – BA, MT, MG, RJ, SP, SC, RS
- Tylophoron rufescens **B** – MT, SP, PR

== U ==
- Umbilicaria africana – MG, RJ
- Usnea alata **B** – MS, MG, ES, RJ, SP, PR, SC, RS
- Usnea amblyoclada – PE, MG, ES, RJ, PR, RS
- Usnea amplissima – MG, SP
- Usnea angulata – AL, MG, RJ, SP, PR, SC, RS
- Usnea arianae – MG, SC
- Usnea arthroclada **B** – MG, RJ, SP, PR, SC, RS
- Usnea aspera **B** – AL, BA, MG, RJ, SP, SC
- Usnea aurantiaciparvula **B** – CE, PE, BA, MT, MS, MG
- Usnea australis – MG, SP
- Usnea baileyi – MT, MG, RJ, SP, SC, RS
- Usnea bicolorata – SP
- Usnea boomiana – MG, SP, SC
- Usnea brasiliensis **B** – PE, MG, SP, PR, SC, RS
- Usnea ceratina – MG, SP, PR, RS
- Usnea chilensis – PR, SC, RS
- Usnea chlorocarpa – SC
- Usnea cinchonae – RJ, SC
- Usnea cirrosa – MG, RJ, SP, PR, SC, RS
- Usnea cladocarpa **B** – BA, MG, RJ, SP, PR, SC
- Usnea complecta **B** – AL, MG, ES, SP
- Usnea concinna **B** – BA, MG, RJ, SP, SC, RS
- Usnea cornuta – PE, MG, SP, PR, SC, RS
- Usnea cristatula – BA, DF, MG, PR, SC, RS
- Usnea dasaea – PE, AL, MT, MS, GO, MG, ES, SP, PR, RS
- Usnea densirostra – PE, AL, MT, MG, ES, RJ, SP, PR, SC, RS
- Usnea dimorpha – RS
- Usnea dodgei – MG, SP, PR, SC, RS
- Usnea entoviolata – MT, MG, RJ, SP, PR
- Usnea erinacea – MG, ES, RJ, SP, PR, SC, RS
- Usnea fallax **B** – SP, PR
- Usnea feeana **B** – RJ, SP
- Usnea firma **B** – GO, MG, RJ, SP, SC
- Usnea flabelliformis **B** – SP, PR, SC, RS
- Usnea flavocardia – MS
- Usnea fleigiae **B** – PR, SC, RS
- Usnea furfurosula **B** – MG, PR
- Usnea geissleriana – MG, RJ, SP, PR, RS
- Usnea gigas – SP
- Usnea goniodes – MG, SP
- Usnea gracilis – MG
- Usnea grandispora **B** – PR, SC, RS
- Usnea hieronymii – RJ
- Usnea humboldtii – RJ
- Usnea implicata – SC
- Usnea intercalaris – MG
- Usnea jamaicensis – SP
- Usnea jelskii – PE, MG, RJ
- Usnea kalbiana **B** – MG, ES, RJ, SP, PR, SC
- Usnea krempelhuberi – AM, SP, PR, RS
- Usnea kriegeriana – ES, MG, PR, RS, SC, SP
- Usnea laevis **B** – GO, MG, ES, SC
- Usnea leioclada **B** – SP, RJ, MG
- Usnea leprosa – SP
- Usnea ludicra **B** – ES
- Usnea lunaria **B** – BA, MT, MG, RJ
- Usnea macaronesica – MG, ES, SP, SC, RS
- Usnea madeirensis – MG
- Usnea malmei **B** – MG, RJ, SP, PR, SC, RS
- Usnea meridionalis **B** – MT, MS, MG, ES, RJ, SP, PR, SC, RS
- Usnea merrillii – RJ, SP, PR, SC, RS
- Usnea mexicana – MT, GO, RJ, SP, PR, SC
- Usnea microcarpa – MG
- Usnea moreliana – RJ, SP, PR, SC, RS
- Usnea nashii – MG
- Usnea oreophila **B** – MG, ES, PR, SC
- Usnea papillata **B** – BA, MG, PR, SC, RS
- Usnea parvula – PE, MG, RJ, SP, PR, SC, RS
- Usnea perhispidella – AL, MG, ES, SP, PR, SC, RS
- Usnea perplectata – MT, MS, SP, SC
- Usnea perplexans – MG, RJ, RS
- Usnea plicata – MG, RJ, SC
- Usnea poliothrix **B** – PE, MT, MS, MG, PR, RS
- Usnea ramulosissima – SC
- Usnea regia **B** – MG, RJ, SP, PR, SC, RS
- Usnea regnellii **B** – MG, RJ
- Usnea repens **B** – MT, MG
- Usnea roccellina – MG
- Usnea rubicunda – AL, MG, ES, RJ, SP, PR, RS
- Usnea rubropallens **B** – SC
- Usnea sanctae-ritae – RJ, SP, RS
- Usnea setulosa – SP
- Usnea sorediosula – SP
- Usnea spinulifera **B** – MG, ES, RJ, SP, PR, RS
- Usnea spinulosa **B** – MG, RJ, SC
- Usnea steineri **B** – MG, RJ, SP, PR, SC, RS
- Usnea stipitata **B** – MG, SP, PR, SC, RS
- Usnea subcomosa **B** – PE, MS, MG, RJ, SP, SC, RS
- Usnea subcornuta – SP
- Usnea subdasaea – MG, SP, SC, RS
- Usnea subelegans **B** – BA, MT, MS, MG, RJ, SP, PR, SC, RS
- Usnea subflammea – MG, RJ, SP, PR, SC, RS
- Usnea subflorida – SP, RS
- Usnea subgracilis – RJ, SP, PR, SC, RS
- Usnea subparvula **B** – MT, MS, GO, SP, PR, RS
- Usnea subpectinata – MG, SC, RS
- Usnea subscabrosa – MT, MG, RJ, SP, PR, SC, RS
- Usnea tenuicorticata – MG, SP, PR, SC, RS
- Usnea tincta **B** – MT, RJ, SP, PR, RS
- Usnea trachyclada **B** – MG, SP, PR, SC
- Usnea transitoria – PR, SC
- Usnea venusta **B** – SP, SC, RS

== V ==
- Vainionora aemulans **B** – BA, MT, MG, SP, SC
- Vainionora atroviridis – MG, RJ, RS
- Vainionora flavovirens – PE, AL, BA, MG, SP
- Vainionora hypocrocea **B** – AL, BA, MS, MG, RJ
- Vainionora pallidostraminea **B** – MG, RJ, RS
- Vainionora sorediata **B** – SC
- Vainionora stramineopallens **B** – BA, MG
- Vainionora warmingii **B** – BA, MG, SP
- Varicellaria velata – MT, MG, ES, RJ, SP, SC, RS
- Verrucaria aethiobola – BA
- Verrucaria aquatilis – MS, SP
- Verrucaria brunneola **B** – MS
- Verrucaria dolosa – MS, MG, SP, RS
- Verrucaria elaeina – MS, SP
- Verrucaria elaeomelaena – MS
- Verrucaria hydrophila – SP
- Verrucaria macrostoma – PE, MS
- Verrucaria margacea – MA, MS, SP
- Verrucaria mattogrossensis **B** – MT
- Verrucaria muralis – PE, MG
- Verrucaria murina – SE
- Verrucaria myriocarpella **B** – MS
- Verrucaria nigrescens – PE, BA, MS, RS
- Verrucaria obtecta – MG
- Verrucaria pachyderma – BA, MG, SC, RS
- Verrucaria perexigua **B** – AM (provisionally accepted)
- Verrucaria pertensa **B** – AM (provisionally accepted)
- Verrucaria praetermissa – SP
- Verrucaria retrusa **B** – AM (provisionally accepted)
- Verrucaria riograndensis **B** – RS
- Verrucaria umbilicatula **B** – RJ
- Verruciplaca calcarea – RJ
- Verruciplaca verrucifera – PE, AL, SE, BA, MT, MS, RJ, SP
- Vezdaea foliicola – PE, RJ, SP
- Vezdaea leprosa – SP
- Vezdaea polyspora **B** – SP
- Vezdaea stipitata – MT, MG, SC
- Vezdamyces albopruinosus – PE, RJ
- Vezdamyces vulgaris **B** – AM, AP, PB, BA, MT, MS, MG, ES, RJ, SP, PR, RS
- Vigneronia caceresiana **B** – PE, BA
- Viridothelium indutum – RO
- Viridothelium inspersum – MT
- Viridothelium leptoseptatum **B** – SE
- Viridothelium sinuosogelatinosum **B** – AM
- Viridothelium ustulatum **B** – AM

== W ==
- Wetmoreana bahiensis **B** – BA
- Wetmoreana blastidiocalcarea **B** – MS
- Wetmoreana brachyloba – MA, CE, SE, MS, ES, RS
- Wetmoreana chapadensis **B** – MA, CE, PE, MT
- Wetmoreana intensa **B** – PE, SE
- Wetmoreana ochraceofulva – CE, AL, SE, SC, RS
- Willeya protrudens – MS, RS
- Wirthiotrema glaucopallens – AC, AM, RO, PA, AL, BA, MT
- Wirthiotrema santessonii – AM, SE, BA
- Wirthiotrema trypaneoides – BA, MT, SP
- Wirthiotrema xanthopustulatum **B** – PR

== X ==
- Xanthoparmelia alectoronica – SC
- Xanthoparmelia brasiliensis **B** – MA, PB, PE, AL, MT, MG, PR
- Xanthoparmelia catarinae **B** – MA, BA, MS, PR, SC, RS
- Xanthoparmelia congensis – RO, MG, PR, RS
- Xanthoparmelia conglomerata **B** – RS
- Xanthoparmelia conspersa – MT, MG, ES, SC, RS
- Xanthoparmelia crystallicola **B** – BA, MT, GO, MG, RJ, SP, SC
- Xanthoparmelia echinocarpica **B** – AM, GO, MG
- Xanthoparmelia farinosa – SP, PR, SC, RS
- Xanthoparmelia hypomelaena – SE, SP, RS
- Xanthoparmelia hypopsila – GO, PR, SC, RS
- Xanthoparmelia hypostictica **B** – GO, MG, ES
- Xanthoparmelia kalbii **B** – PB, PE, BA
- Xanthoparmelia marcellii **B** – PB, MG, SP
- Xanthoparmelia microspora – MS, ES, RJ, SC, RS
- Xanthoparmelia monastica **B** – AL, MG, RS
- Xanthoparmelia mougeotii – BA, ES, RS
- Xanthoparmelia mougeotina – MS, PR
- Xanthoparmelia neocumberlandia **B** – PB, PE, SE, MT, MG
- Xanthoparmelia neokalbii – MG, RS
- Xanthoparmelia neopropaguloides **B** – CE, PE, AL, SE, BA, MT, MS, GO, MG, ES, SP, PR, SC, RS
- Xanthoparmelia plittii – PB, PE, AL, SE, BA, MT, MS, MG, RJ, SP, PR, SC, RS
- Xanthoparmelia saxeti – MT, MS, MG, SP, RS
- Xanthoparmelia sipmanii – RJ
- Xanthoparmelia subplittii – MA, PB, PE, BA, MT, GO, MG, RJ
- Xanthoparmelia subramigera – PR, SC, RS
- Xanthoparmelia substenophylloides – SE, MT, GO, MG, ES, RJ, SP, SC, RS
- Xanthoparmelia subtinctina **B** – PE, SC, RS
- Xanthoparmelia succedans **B** – AM, PB, PE, SE, BA, MS, GO, MG, RJ, SP, SC, RS
- Xanthoparmelia tasmanica – SC, RS
- Xanthoparmelia ulcerosa – RS
- Xanthoparmelia wildeae – SC
- Xanthoparmelia wrightiana – SP, SC
- Xanthoparmelia xanthomelaena – MT, MG, RJ, PR
- Xanthoparmelia xavieri **B** – PE, MG, PR
- Xanthoria parietina – RS
- Xylographa parallela – PE, RJ

== Y ==
- Yoshimuriella carassensis **B** – MG, SP, PR
- Yoshimuriella corrosa – MG, RJ
- Yoshimuriella dissecta – MG, RJ, SP
- Yoshimuriella fendleri – MG
- Yoshimuriella minor – MG, RJ
- Yoshimuriella peltigera **B** – MG, RJ, SP
- Yoshimuriella subdissecta – MS, RJ

== Z ==
- Zwackhia bonplandii – PA, BA, MS, RJ, SP, SC, RS
- Zwackhia prosodea – AM, RO, PA, MT, RJ, RS
- Zwackhia robusta – PB, PE, SE, BA
