= Parmotrema saxoisidiatum =

Scientific classification
- Domain: Eukaryota
- Kingdom: Fungi
- Division: Ascomycota
- Class: Lecanoromycetes
- Order: Lecanorales
- Family: Parmeliaceae
- Genus: Parmotrema
- Species: P. saxoisidiatum

Binomial name
- Parmotrema saxoisidiatum Spielmann & Bungartz (2019)

Species of lichen

Parmotrema saxoisidiatum is a rare species of saxicolous (rock-dwelling), foliose lichen in the family Parmeliaceae. Found on the Galápagos Islands, it was formally described as a new species in 2019 by lichenologists Frank Bungartz and Adriano Spielmann. The type specimen was collected from Floreana Island at an altitude of 365 m (1,198 ft), where it was found growing on a lava cliff. It is only known from the type specimen. The species epithet refers to both its substrate and its idisia, which are simple, cylindrical, and mostly unbranched.

== Description ==
The upper thallus surface of Parmotrema saxoisidiatum is white to whitish gray, with a dull to shiny texture and densely reticulated and speckled appearance. It is often isidiate, with cylindrical isidia that are mostly simple or sparsely branched, occasionally clustered and longer along the lobe margin. The isidia have a brown to blackened tip and lack cilia. The lobes are small to moderate-sized (typically 0.3–4 mm wide), angular, and have sparsely to abundantly ciliate margins. The lower surface is black, gradually becoming dark brown towards the margin, without a distinct rhizine-free zone. The rhizines are long, slender, black, mostly simple, and sometimes sparsely branched. The medulla is white. Apothecia and pycnidia have not been observed among the collected specimens.

The cortex contains atranorin, while the medulla has salazinic acid. The expected results of standard chemical spot tests in the cortex are P+ (yellow), K+ (yellow), KC−, C−, UV−; and in the medulla P+ (deep yellow), K+ (yellow turning dark red), KC−, C−, UV−.

== See also ==
- List of Parmotrema species
