= Parmotrema soredioaliphaticum =

Scientific classification
- Domain: Eukaryota
- Kingdom: Fungi
- Division: Ascomycota
- Class: Lecanoromycetes
- Order: Lecanorales
- Family: Parmeliaceae
- Genus: Parmotrema
- Species: P. soredioaliphaticum

Binomial name
- Parmotrema soredioaliphaticum Estrabou & Adler (1998)

Species of lichen

Parmotrema soredioaliphaticum is a species of saxicolous lichen in the family Parmeliaceae. Found in South America, it was described as new to science in 1998. The holotype was collected in Cerro Colorado in northern Córdoba Province, Argentina, where it was found growing on a rock. The thallus of the lichen is foliose, with a pale grey colour, and measures up to 10 cm (4 in) across. It is a morph of the species Parmotrema alidactylatum with sorediate dactyls (finger-like protrusions with a powdery surface). Parmotrema soredioaliphaticum was reported from Bolivia in 2012.

== See also ==
- List of Parmotrema species
