= Parmotrema arteagum =

Scientific classification
- Domain: Eukaryota
- Kingdom: Fungi
- Division: Ascomycota
- Class: Lecanoromycetes
- Order: Lecanorales
- Family: Parmeliaceae
- Genus: Parmotrema
- Species: P. arteagum

Binomial name
- Parmotrema arteagum Egan (1982)

Species of lichen

Parmotrema arteagum is a species of foliose lichen in the family Parmeliaceae. It was described as new to science in 1982 by Robert Egan. Found in west-central Mexico, the holotype collection was made in Arteaga, after which the lichen is named. It grows on the branches of oak and other deciduous trees in woodlands at elevations between 600–900 metres (2,000–3,000 ft). Parmotrema arteagum is a member of the Parmotrema perforans species complex because of its broad lobes with cilia at the margins, perforations in the apothecia, and lower surfaces with white borders that lack rhizines.

== Taxonomy ==
Parmotrema arteagum was described in 1982 by Robert S. Egan after fieldwork in the municipality of Arteaga, western Mexico—hence the species epithet. The holotype was collected at 600 m elevation on the road from Playa Azul to Nueva Italia de Ruiz, with additional gatherings from the same highway corridor up to about 900 m (3,000 ft). All collections were made on the bark of oak and other deciduous trees in open woodland. Egan assigned the lichen to the family Parmeliaceae and placed it within the P. perforatum complex, a group characterized by broad lobes, marginal cilia ("hairs"), perforate apothecia, and a broad, white, rhizine-free band on the lower surface.

Although outwardly similar to P. perforatum and its allies, the Mexican species differs in several respects. Chemically it contains just atranorin (in the outer cortex) and salazinic acid (in the medulla); other members of the species complex often produce additional compounds such as galbinic or norstictic acids. Morphologically it is non-sorediate, has a continuously white undersurface, and develops unusually large ascospores (16–20 × 8.5–11 μm) and especially long conidia (16–23 μm)—dimensions that exceed those reported for most other in the genus. These distinctions led Egan to regard P. arteagum as an independent species within the complex rather than a chemical or vegetative variant of an existing taxon. According to a 2020 study on the genus, Parmotrema foliolosum (up to 30 μm) and P. austrocetratum (up to 25 μm) are the only two species with longer recorded conidia.

== Description ==
The thallus is robust and loosely attached, forming leathery, gray to buff rosettes up to about 10 cm across. Lobes are broad (5–10 mm), rounded, and often split into elongate, somewhat ascending segments that overlap like shingles. Short, black cilia 1–3 mm long are sparsely to moderately distributed along the margins. The upper surface is plane to slightly wrinkled toward the center and lacks both soredia and isidia—tiny vegetative propagules common in many foliose lichens. Under a hand lens the cortex shows minute pores (openings in the outer skin) near the lobe tips, a feature revealed more clearly in scanning-electron micrographs.

Below, the surface is strikingly white except for a small pale-brown patch at the center; rhizines (root-like holdfasts) are few and confined to that central zone. The medulla is white and reacts K+ (yellow changing to red), a color test indicating salazinic acid, while the cortex turns K+ (bright yellow) from atranorin. Apothecia are large (3–10 mm), slightly stalked, and perforate—the disc bears a neat hole that exposes the tissue beneath. Ascospores are ellipsoid, and the abundant pycnidia produce long, thread-like conidia.

== Habitat and distribution ==
At the time of its original publication, Parmotrema arteagum was known only from a short stretch of the coastal-slope highway system in western Michoacán, Mexico, between roughly 600 and 900 m elevation. All verified specimens were taken from tree branches in open oak woodland or low tropical deciduous forest along mountain ridges.

These ridges intercept moist Pacific air masses, so morning fogs and low clouds often form, providing the intermittent moisture that favors large foliose lichens. The surrounding lowlands, which are hotter and drier, lack comparable foliose growth. Given this narrow elevational belt and the species' apparent absence from adjacent regions, P. arteagum is probably a local endemic whose true range may remain underestimated owing to the remoteness of its habitat and the limited botanical exploration of similar ridge-top woodlands in neighboring states.

== See also ==
- List of Parmotrema species
