= Parmotrema erectociliatum =

Scientific classification
- Domain: Eukaryota
- Kingdom: Fungi
- Division: Ascomycota
- Class: Lecanoromycetes
- Order: Lecanorales
- Family: Parmeliaceae
- Genus: Parmotrema
- Species: P. erectociliatum

Binomial name
- Parmotrema erectociliatum Spielmann & Bungartz (2019)

Species of lichen

Parmotrema erectociliatum is a rare species of saxicolous (rock-dwelling), foliose lichen in the family Parmeliaceae. Found on the Galápagos Islands, it was formally described as a new species in 2019 by lichenologists Frank Bungartz and Adriano Spielmann. The type specimen was collected from Santa Cruz Island near Academy Bay, where it was found growing on a boulder on a talus slope under a ravine. It is only known from the type specimen. The species epithet refers to its long, erect cilia.

== Description ==
The upper thallus surface of Parmotrema erectociliatum is whitish gray to ivory and can have a shiny or dull appearance, with some irregular cracking. The upper surface is covered in soredia, which are powdery structures that contain fungal spores. The soralia (structures that produce the soredia), are located at the margins of the lobes and can be linear or crescent-shaped. The lobes are broad, small to moderate-sized, 2–7 mm wide, and rotund in shape. The edges of the lobes are defined by a conspicuous black rim and have long, stout, and slender cilia that are black, mostly straight, and typically 0.5–1 mm long. The lower surface of the lichen has a narrow, blackened area that is 0.5–1 mm wide, with short, stout, and black rhizines. Apothecia and pycnidia, which are reproductive structures, were not observed in this species.

The cortex contains atranorin, while the medulla has salazinic acid. The expected results of standard chemical spot tests in the cortex are P+ (yellow),K+ (yellow), KC−, C−, UV−; and in the medulla P+ (deep yellow), K+ (yellow soon turning dark red), KC−, C−, UV−.

== See also ==
- List of Parmotrema species
