= Parmotrema andinum =

Scientific classification
- Kingdom: Fungi
- Division: Ascomycota
- Class: Lecanoromycetes
- Order: Lecanorales
- Family: Parmeliaceae
- Genus: Parmotrema
- Species: P. andinum

Binomial name
- Parmotrema andinum (Müll.Arg.) Hale (1974)

Synonyms
- Parmelia andina Müll.Arg. (1879)

Species of lichen

Parmotrema andinum is a species of lichen in the family Parmeliaceae. It was first described as new to science in 1879 by Johannes Müller Argoviensis as a species of Parmelia. Mason Hale transferred it to Parmotrema in 1975. It is found in Africa, Asia, and South America. In Mauritania, this species is used as tobacco. A metabolomic analysis of this lichen revealed the presence of 30 secondary compounds.

== See also ==
- List of Parmotrema species
