= Parmotrema abnuens =

Scientific classification
- Domain: Eukaryota
- Kingdom: Fungi
- Division: Ascomycota
- Class: Lecanoromycetes
- Order: Lecanorales
- Family: Parmeliaceae
- Genus: Parmotrema
- Species: P. abnuens

Binomial name
- Parmotrema abnuens (Nyl.) Hale (1974)

Synonyms
- Parmelia abnuens Nyl. (1885)

Species of lichen

Parmotrema abnuens is a species of corticolous lichen in the family Parmeliaceae. It was first introduced to science in 1885 as a species of Parmelia by William Nylander in 1885, who described the lichen from samples collected in Uruguay. Mason Hale transferred it to the genus Parmotrema in 1974. The species has also been recorded from Brazil and India.

== See also ==
- List of Parmotrema species
