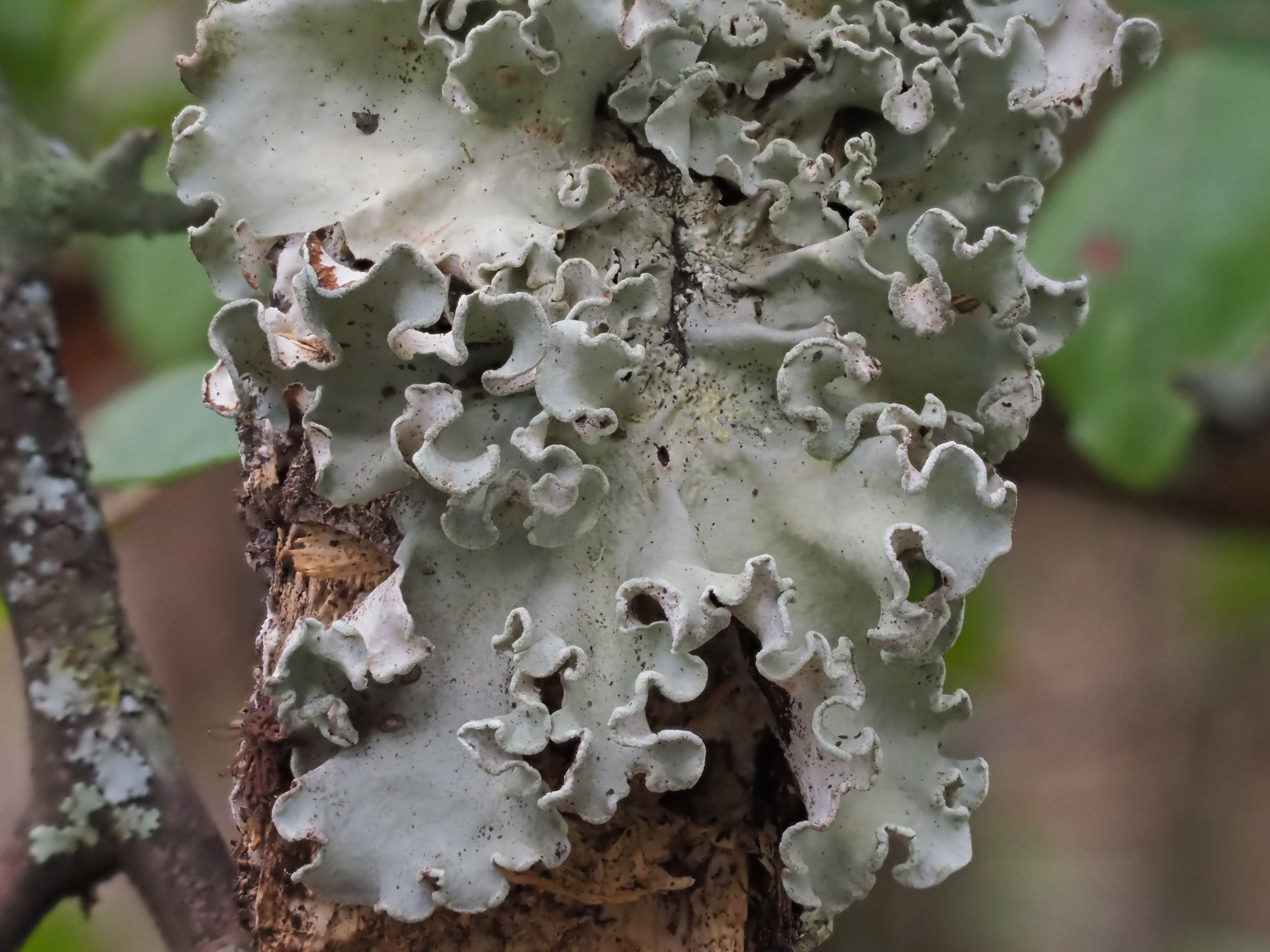

Conservation status
- Apparently Secure (NatureServe)

Scientific classification
- Kingdom: Fungi
- Division: Ascomycota
- Class: Lecanoromycetes
- Order: Lecanorales
- Family: Parmeliaceae
- Genus: Parmotrema
- Species: P. austrosinense

Binomial name
- Parmotrema austrosinense (Zahlbr.) Hale (1974)

Synonyms
- Parmelia austrosinensis Zahlbr. (1930)

= Parmotrema austrosinense =

Species of lichen-forming fungus

Parmotrema austrosinense is a widely distributed species of lichen in the family Parmeliaceae. It was first officially described as a species of Parmelia by Austrian botanist Alexander Zahlbruckner in 1930. Mason Hale transferred it to Parmotrema in 1974.

In Nepal, Parmotrema austrosinense has been reported from 750 to 3,000 m elevation in a compilation of published records.

== See also ==
- List of Parmotrema species
