= Parmotrema aptrootii =

Scientific classification
- Domain: Eukaryota
- Kingdom: Fungi
- Division: Ascomycota
- Class: Lecanoromycetes
- Order: Lecanorales
- Family: Parmeliaceae
- Genus: Parmotrema
- Species: P. aptrootii

Binomial name
- Parmotrema aptrootii Aubel (1992)

Species of lichen

Parmotrema aptrootii is a species of corticolous (bark-dwelling) foliose lichen in the family Parmeliaceae. Found in South America, it was described as new to science in 1992. It has a pale yellowish to greenish-grey thallus measuring up to about 10 cm (4 in). The lichen has also been recorded from Acre, Brazil, where it is commonly found on dead branches in dense shrubby campinas.

== Taxonomy ==
Parmotrema aptrootii was formally described in 1992 by J. van Aubel from material collected along the Kamarang River in the Cuyuni-Mazaruni region of Guyana. The holotype (Sipman & Aptroot 18187, herbarium U) was taken from the bark of a mahogany tree about 500 m above sea level. The specific epithet honours the Dutch lichenologist André Aptroot, one of the collectors of the type. Within Parmeliaceae the species sits among a small cohort of sorediate Parmotrema taxa, but it is readily distinguished by its rather narrow, emaculate lobes and by the combination of secondary metabolites detected by thin-layer chromatography. Apothecia and pycnidia have not been observed in this species.

== Description ==
The lichen forms a closely attached (adnate) foliose (leafy) thallus up to about 10 cm across. Individual lobes are 3–6 mm wide, with rounded tips and a slightly crenulate, wavy outline. Along the raised lobe margins lie the soralia—small, initially dot-like patches that can elongate and coalesce. These soralia release soredia: minute, flour-like clumps of algal and fungal cells that give the margins a coralloid appearance. The upper surface is pale yellowish- to greenish-grey, dull and without pale spotting (emaculate); near the thallus centre it becomes faintly wrinkled (rugose) and may crack, sometimes showing flakes of cortex where the margins lift.

Internally, the medulla is white and unpigmented. The lower surface is black in the centre but grades to dark brown towards the lobe tips; it bears sparse, simple, jet-black rhizines up to 0.4 mm long that act as tiny holdfasts. No cilia fringe the margins. Secondary chemistry is dominated by usnic acid (which lends the thallus its pale green cast) together with echinocarpic and protocetraric acids, a profile that helps separate the species from chemically similar members of the genus.

== Habitat and distribution ==
Parmotrema aptrootii is corticolous, growing on the bark of hardwoods in warm, humid lowland forest. The type population occurs on riverside mahogany at about 500 m in the Upper Mazaruni District of western Guyana. Subsequent records extend its range west and south into the Colombian Amazon (Araracuara region) and to white-sand campina shrublands in Acre State, Brazil, where it is common on dead branches protruding into the canopy light. The scattered, disjunct localities all lie within the northern Amazon basin, suggesting the species favours nutrient-poor, well-lit bark substrates in tropical lowland to sub-montane settings.

== See also ==
- List of Parmotrema species
