= Parmotrema lichexanthonicum =

Scientific classification
- Domain: Eukaryota
- Kingdom: Fungi
- Division: Ascomycota
- Class: Lecanoromycetes
- Order: Lecanorales
- Family: Parmeliaceae
- Genus: Parmotrema
- Species: P. lichexanthonicum

Binomial name
- Parmotrema lichexanthonicum Eliasaro & Adler (1997)

Species of lichen

Parmotrema lichexanthonicum is a species of foliose lichen in the family Parmeliaceae. Found in Brazil, it was formally described as a new species in 1997 by Sionara Eliasaro and Mónica Adler. The type specimen was collected by the first author from the Serra do Cipó (Santana do Riacho, Minas Gerais); here the lichen was found growing on a rock. The specific epithet lichexanthonicum refers to the presence of the secondary compound lichexanthone in the medulla of the lichen. Other compounds in the lichen are the depsidone salazinic acid (found in the medulla), and the depside atranorin (found in the cortex). A close relative to this species is Parmotrema ultralucens, which contains the same cortical and medullary metabolites.

== See also ==
- List of Parmotrema species
