= Parmotrema appendiculatum =

Scientific classification
- Domain: Eukaryota
- Kingdom: Fungi
- Division: Ascomycota
- Class: Lecanoromycetes
- Order: Lecanorales
- Family: Parmeliaceae
- Genus: Parmotrema
- Species: P. appendiculatum

Binomial name
- Parmotrema appendiculatum (Fée) Hale (1974)

Synonyms
- Parmelia appendiculata Fée (1837)

Species of lichen

Parmotrema appendiculatum is a species of lichen in the family Parmeliaceae. Found in South America, it was originally described by French botanist Antoine Laurent Apollinaire Fée in 1837 as a species of Parmelia. Mason Hale transferred it to the genus Parmotrema in 1974.

== See also ==
- List of Parmotrema species
