= Parmotrema weberi =

Scientific classification
- Kingdom: Fungi
- Division: Ascomycota
- Class: Lecanoromycetes
- Order: Lecanorales
- Family: Parmeliaceae
- Genus: Parmotrema
- Species: P. weberi

Binomial name
- Parmotrema weberi Hale ex Spielm. & Bungartz (2019)

Species of lichen

Parmotrema weberi is a species of saxicolous lichen and belongs to the Parmotrema genus. It is only found on the Galapagos Islands.

Mason Hale informally recognized the species in 1977, with several specimens samples having the name Parmotrema weberi handwritten on the samples. Although he has named the species he never published a description of the species. Frank Bungartz and Adriano Spielmann formally described the species in 2019. The species is named after William A. Weber and honors Weber for his work on the lichens of the Galapagos.

== Description ==
Parmotrema weberi closely resembles P. dilatatum and P. eborinum, which share the same white, shiny, lobulate thallus with black-rimmed lobes; the three can be confused in the field. All three contain protocetraric acid in the medulla, but P. weberi has caperatic acid where the other two have echinocarpic acid.

== Habitat and range ==
Parmotrema weberi grows only on rock and is only found on the Galapagos Islands.

== See also ==
- List of Parmotrema species
