= Parmotrema barioense =

Scientific classification
- Domain: Eukaryota
- Kingdom: Fungi
- Division: Ascomycota
- Class: Lecanoromycetes
- Order: Lecanorales
- Family: Parmeliaceae
- Genus: Parmotrema
- Species: P. barioense

Binomial name
- Parmotrema barioense Elix, Laily & G.Ismail (1997)

Species of lichen

Parmotrema barioense is a species of corticolous lichen in the family Parmeliaceae. The holotype specimen was collected in a Kerangas forest in Sarawak, Malaysia. It has a loosely attached greyish thallus measuring 10–12 cm (3.9–4.7 in) wide, comprising individual lobes 6–20 mm wide. It contains the secondary compounds atranorin, chloroatranorin, protocetraric acid, and butlerin derivatives. The lichen resembles Parmotrema zollingeri, but can be distinguished from that species by the older, convoluted lobes in the centre of the thallus, the larger ascospores, and the presence of butlerins.

== See also ==
- List of Parmotrema species
