= Parmotrema betaniae =

Scientific classification
- Domain: Eukaryota
- Kingdom: Fungi
- Division: Ascomycota
- Class: Lecanoromycetes
- Order: Lecanorales
- Family: Parmeliaceae
- Genus: Parmotrema
- Species: P. betaniae

Binomial name
- Parmotrema betaniae Hale (1986)

Species of lichen

Parmotrema betaniae is a species of corticolous lichen in the family Parmeliaceae that is found in Venezuela. It was described as a new species in 1986 by lichenologist Mason Hale. The holotype was collected in Táchira State, in the valley of Páramo de Tamá, at an elevation of 2,300 metres (7,500 ft). It has also been recorded from Bolivia. Its thallus measures up to 14 cm (5.5 in) in diameter. It is characterized by the pigmentation of most of its medulla, coloured pale orange or salmon-red to yellow (except for the upper part).

== See also ==
- List of Parmotrema species
