= List of Parmotrema species =

This is a list of species in the lichen genus Parmotrema. A 2016 estimate places about 300 species in the genus.

== A ==
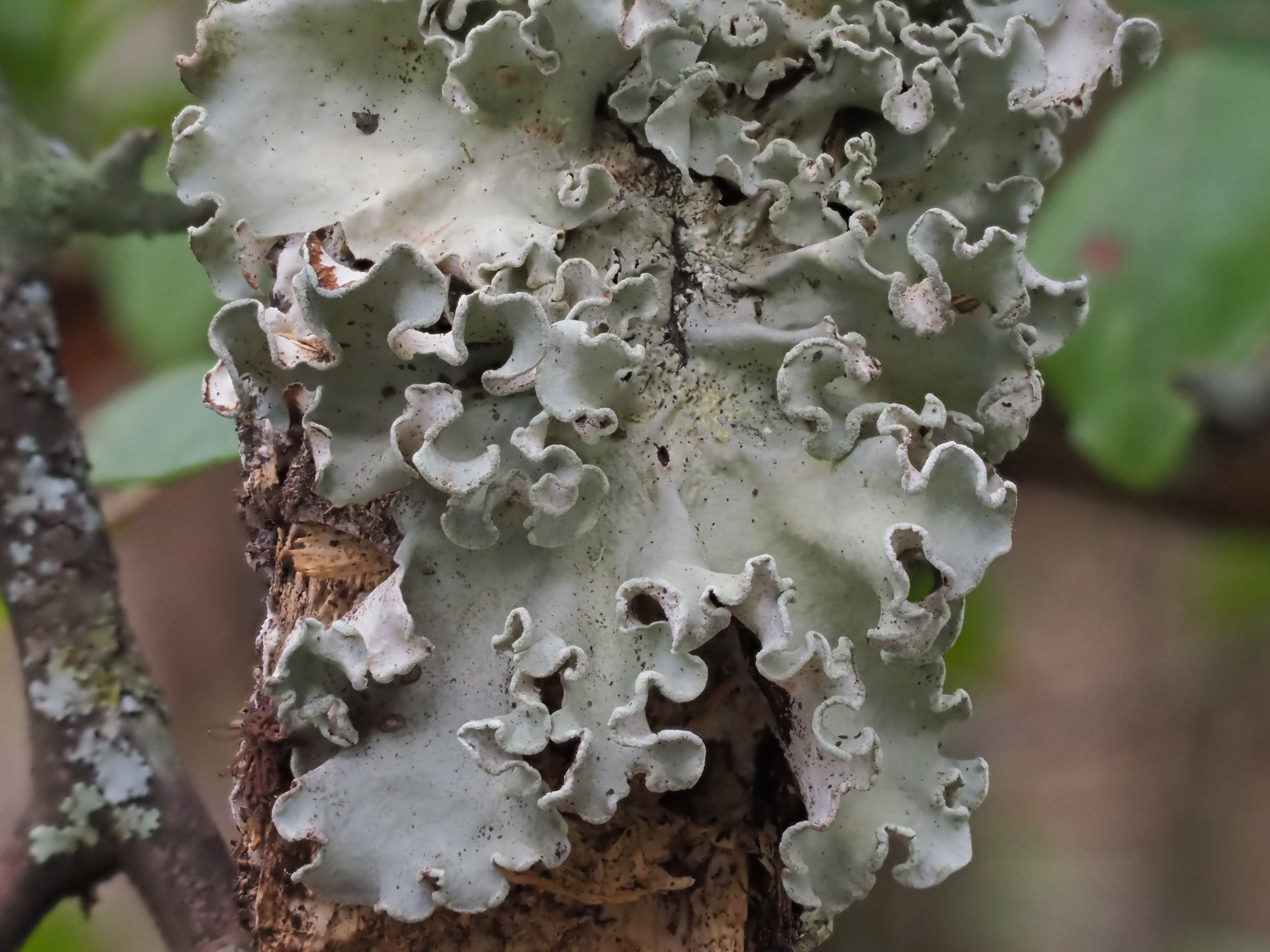
Parmotrema austrosinense

- Parmotrema aberrans (Vain.) Canêz & Marcelli (2008)
- Parmotrema abessinicum (Kremp.) Hale (1974)
- Parmotrema abnuens (Nyl.) Hale (1974)
- Parmotrema acanthifolium (Pers.) A.A.Spielm. & Marcelli (2020)
- Parmotrema acrotrychum (Kurok.) Streimann (1986)
- Parmotrema acutatum Kurok. (2001)
- Parmotrema adspersum (Vain.) Elix (2002)
- Parmotrema afrocetratum Elix, Eb.Fischer & Killmann (2005) – Rwanda
- Parmotrema albinatum (K.H.Moon, Kurok. & Kashiw.) O.Blanco, A.Crespo, Divakar, Elix & Lumbsch (2005)
- Parmotrema aldabrense (C.W.Dodge) Hale (1974)
- Parmotrema alectoronicum C.H.Ribeiro & Marcelli (2002) – Brazil
- Parmotrema alidactylatum Estrabou & Adler (1998) – Argentina
- Parmotrema amaniense (J.Steiner & Zahlbr.) Krog & Swinscow (1983)
- Parmotrema amboimense (C.W.Dodge) Hale (1974)
- Parmotrema anchietanum Marcelli, Benatti & Elix (2008) – Brazil
- Parmotrema andinum (Müll.Arg.) Hale (1974)
- Parmotrema appendiculatum (Fée) Hale (1974)
- Parmotrema applanatum Marcelli & C.H.Ribeiro (2002) – Brazil
- Parmotrema apricum (Krog & Swinscow) Krog & Swinscow (1983)
- Parmotrema aptrootii Aubel (1992) – Guyana
- Parmotrema araucariarum (Zahlbr.) Hale (1974)
- Parmotrema argentinum (Kremp.) Hale (1974)
- Parmotrema arnoldii (Du Rietz) Hale (1974)
- Parmotrema arteagum Egan (1982) – Mexico
- Parmotrema asperum Benatti, Marcelli & Elix (2008) – Brazil
- Parmotrema aurantiacoparvum Sipman (1992) – Guyana
- Parmotrema austrocetratum Elix & J.Johnst. (1988) – New Zealand
- Parmotrema austromaculatum A.A.Spielm. & Marcelli (2020)
- Parmotrema austrosinense (Zahlbr.) Hale (1974)
- Parmotrema awasthii Divakar & Upreti (2003) – India

== B ==
- Parmotrema balense (Winnem) Hale (1997)
- Parmotrema bangii (Vain.) Hale (1974)
- Parmotrema barioense Elix, Laily & G.Ismail (1997) – Malaysia
- Parmotrema betaniae Hale (1986) – Venezuela
- Parmotrema bifidum A.A.Spielm. & Marcelli (2020)
- Parmotrema blanchetianum (Müll.Arg.) Kalb (1986)
- Parmotrema bonplandii (Mata) O.Blanco, A.Crespo, Divakar, Elix & Lumbsch (2005)
- Parmotrema brasiliense Hale (1990) – Brazil

== C ==
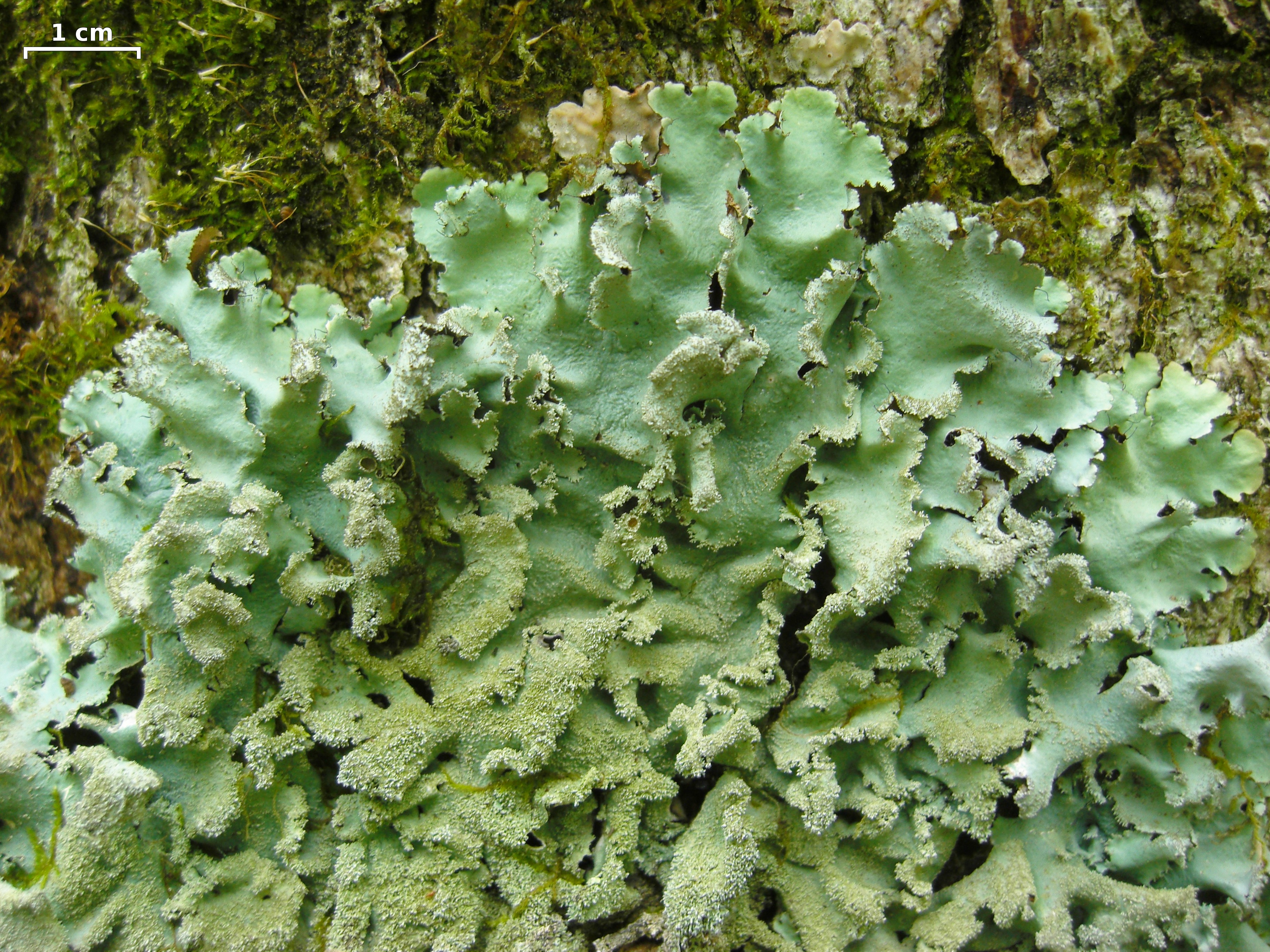
Parmotrema crinitum

- Parmotrema cachimboense Hale (1990) – Brazil
- Parmotrema cactacearum Bungartz & Spielmann (2019)
- Parmotrema catarinae Hale (1990) – Brazil
- Parmotrema chiapense (Hale) Hale (1974)
- Parmotrema chinense (Osbeck) Hale & Ahti (1986)
- Parmotrema clavuliferum (Räsänen) Streimann (1986)
- Parmotrema clercianum A.A.Spielm. (2020)
- Parmotrema ciliiferum Hale (1990) – Brazil
- Parmotrema circinatum Elix & R.W.Rogers (2004) – Australia
- Parmotrema compositum (Hale) Hale (1974)
- Parmotrema concors (Kremp.) A.A.Spielm. & Marcelli (2020)
- Parmotrema concurrens Hale (1977) – Brazil
- Parmotrema conferendum Hale (1977)
- Parmotrema conformatum (Vain.) Hale (1974)
- Parmotrema confusum Hale (1990) – Brazil
- Parmotrema conidioarcuatum Marcelli, Benatti & Elix (2011)
- Parmotrema conjunctum Hale (1974)
- Parmotrema consors (Nyl.) Krog & Swinscow (1983)
- Parmotrema convolutum Elix & J.Johnst. (1988)
- Parmotrema cooperi (J.Steiner & Zahlbr.) Sérus. (1984)
- Parmotrema coralliforme (Hale) Hale (1974)
- Parmotrema corniculans (Nyl.) Hale (1974)
- Parmotrema cornigerum Kurok. (2001)
- Parmotrema cornutum (Lynge) Hale (1974)
- Parmotrema crassescens (Stirt.) Hale (1974)
- Parmotrema crinitoides J.C.Wei (1991)
- Parmotrema crinitum (Ach.) M.Choisy (1952)
- Parmotrema cristatum (Nyl.) Hale (1974)
- Parmotrema cristiferum (Taylor) Hale (1974)
- Parmotrema cristobalii (L.I.Ferraro & Elix) O.Blanco, A.Crespo, Divakar, Elix & Lumbsch (2005)
- Parmotrema crocoides (Hale) Hale (1974)
- Parmotrema cryptoxanthoides (Kurok.) Hale ex DePriest & B.W.Hale (1998)
- Parmotrema cryptoxanthum (Abbayes) Hale (1974)

== D ==
- Parmotrema dactylosum Fleig (1999) – Brazil
- Parmotrema defectum (Hale) Hale (1974)
- Parmotrema deflectens (Kurok.) Streimann (1986)
- Parmotrema degelianum Krog & Swinscow (1983)
- Parmotrema delicatulum (Vain.) Hale (1974)
- Parmotrema demethylmicrophyllinicum Elix (1986)
- Parmotrema despectum Kurok. (2001)
- Parmotrema diacidulum (Hale) Hale (1974)
- Parmotrema dilatatum (Vain.) Hale (1974)
- Parmotrema direagens (Hale) Hale (1974)
- Parmotrema disparile (Nyl.) Hale (1974)
- Parmotrema dissimile Fleig (1999) – Brazil
- Parmotrema diversum (Hale) Hale (1974)
- Parmotrema dolosum (Abbayes) Hale (1974)
- Parmotrema dominicanum (Vain.) Hale (1974)
- Parmotrema durumae (Krog & Swinscow) Krog & Swinscow (1983)

== E ==
- Parmotrema eborinum (Hale) Hale (1974)
- Parmotrema eciliatum (Nyl.) Hale (1974)
- Parmotrema eitenii Marcelli & Benatti (2007) – Brazil
- Parmotrema elacinulatum (Kurok.) Streimann (1986)
- Parmotrema eliasaroanum Benatti, Marcelli & Elix (2008) – Brazil
- Parmotrema elixii A.A.Spielm. & Marcelli (2020)
- Parmotrema endosulphureum (Hillmann) Hale (1974)
- Parmotrema enteroxanthum Hale (1977) – Venezuela
- Parmotrema epileucum (Hale) Kirika, Divakar & Lumbsch (2016)
- Parmotrema erasmium (Hale) Hale (1974)
- Parmotrema erectociliatum Spielmann & Bungartz (2019)
- Parmotrema erhizinosum (D.D.Awasthi) Hale ex DePriest & B.W.Hale (1998)
- Parmotrema erubescens (Stirt.) Krog & Swinscow (1983)
- Parmotrema eunetum (Stirt.) Hale (1974)
- Parmotrema euplectinum Elix, Noich. & Wolseley (2003)
- Parmotrema eurysacum (Hue) Hale (1974)
- Parmotrema expansum Hale (1977) – Costa Rica
- Parmotrema explanatum (Hale) Hale (1974)
- Parmotrema exquisitum (Kurok.) DePriest & B.W.Hale (1998)

== F ==
- Parmotrema fasciculatum (Vain.) Hale (1974)
- Parmotrema fistulatum (Taylor) O.Blanco, A.Crespo, Divakar, Elix & Lumbsch (2005)
- Parmotrema flaccidifolium (Kurok.) Streimann (1986)
- Parmotrema flavescens (Kremp.) Hale (1974)
- Parmotrema flavomedullosum Hale (1974)
- Parmotrema flavotinctum (Hale) Hale (1974)
- Parmotrema fleigiae Canêz & Marcelli (2007) – Brazil
- Parmotrema foliolosum (C.W.Dodge) A.A.Spielm. & Marcelli (2020)
- Parmotrema forsteri Elix & R.W.Rogers (2004) – Australia
- Parmotrema fractum (Hale) Hale (1974)
- Parmotrema fragilescens Krog (1991)
- Parmotrema friabile Marcelli & C.H.Ribeiro (2002) – Brazil
- Parmotrema fumarprotocetraricum Marcelli & Hale (1986)

== G ==
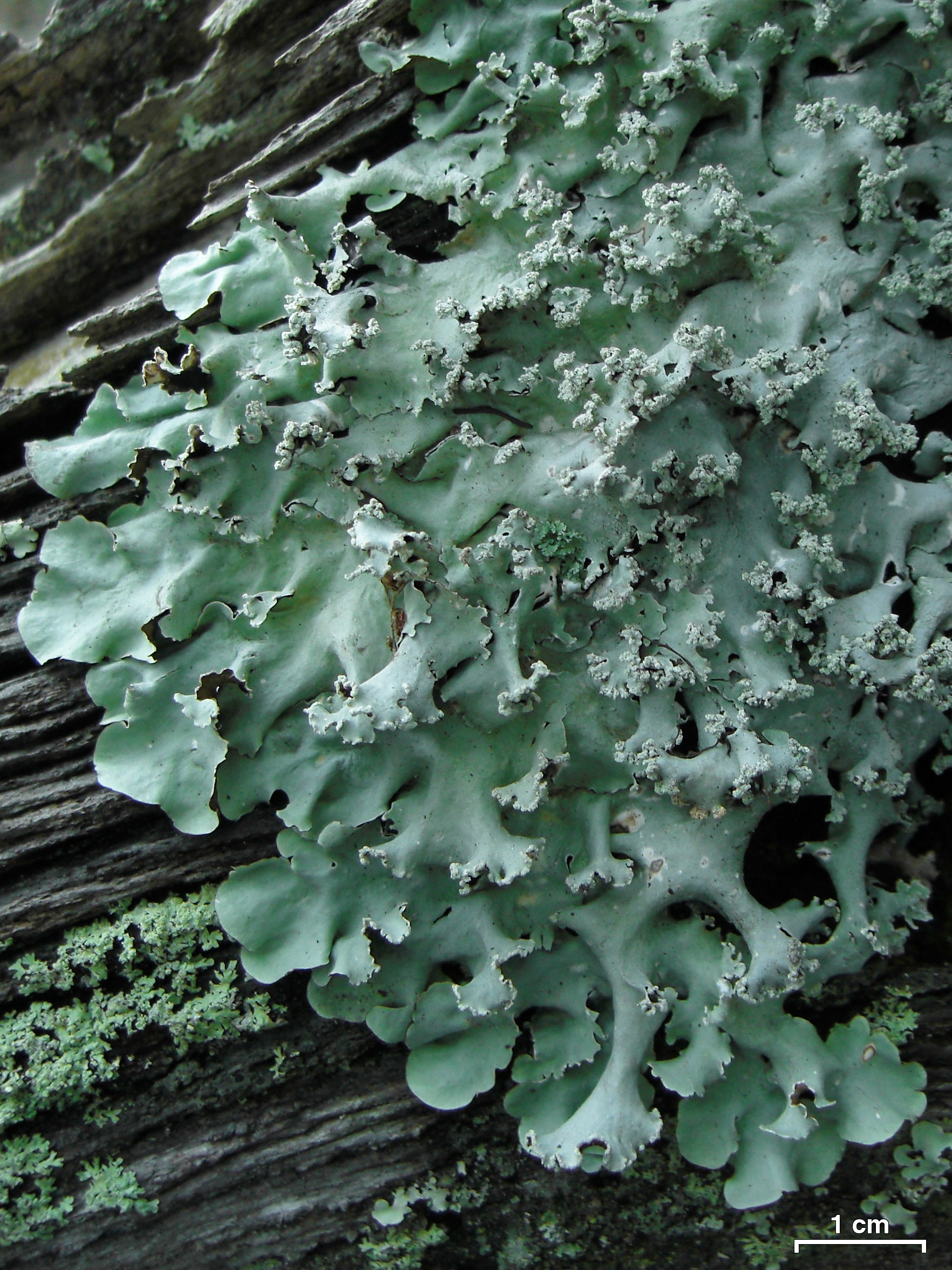
Parmotrema gardneri

- Parmotrema gardneri (C.W.Dodge) Sérus. (1984)
- Parmotrema gibberosum Kurok. (1998)
- Parmotrema glaucocarpoides (Zahlbr.) Hale (1974)
- Parmotrema gloriosum (Kurok.) Streimann (1986)
- Parmotrema gradsteinii Aubel (1992) – Guyana
- Parmotrema graniticum Benatti, Marcelli & Elix (2008) – Brazil
- Parmotrema granulare (Asahina) A.A.Spielm. & Marcelli (2020)
- Parmotrema grayanum (Hue) Hale (1974)

== H ==
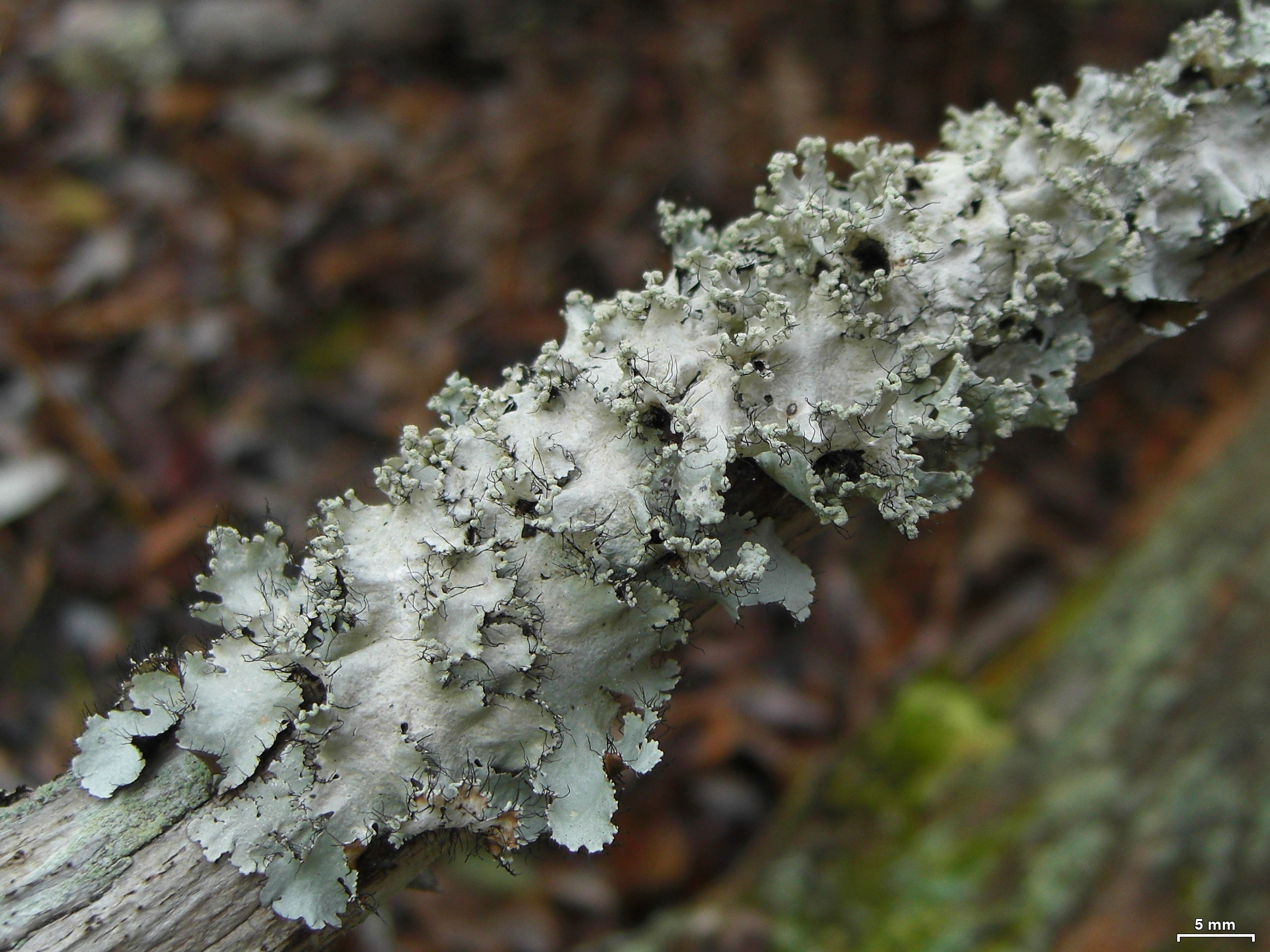
Parmotrema hypoleucinum

- Parmotrema hababianum (Gyeln.) Hale (1974)
- Parmotrema haitiense (Hale) Hale (1974)
- Parmotrema hanningtonianum (Müll.Arg.) Hale (1974)
- Parmotrema hawaiiensis (H.Magn.) O.Blanco, A.Crespo, Divakar, Elix & Lumbsch (2005)
- Parmotrema hensseniae Krog (1990)
- Parmotrema herrei (Zahlbr.) Spielmann & Marcelli (2011)
- Parmotrema hicksii Krog & Swinscow (1986) – Tanzania
- Parmotrema hololobum (Hale) Hale (1974)
- Parmotrema homotomum (Nyl.) Hale (1974)
- Parmotrema horridum Fleig (1999) – Brazil
- Parmotrema hydrium M.N.Benatti (2013)
- Parmotrema hyperlaciniatulum Benatti, Marcelli & Elix (2010) – Brazil
- Parmotrema hypermaculatum Marcelli, Benatti & Elix (2008)– Brazil
- Parmotrema hypoleucinum (J.Steiner) Hale (1974)
- Parmotrema hypomiltoides (Vain.) Kurok. (1998)
- Parmotrema hypotropum (Nyl.) Hale (1974)
- Parmotrema hypotrypum (Nyl.) Hale (1974)

== I ==
- Parmotrema immiscens (Nyl.) Kurok. (1997)
- Parmotrema incrassatum Hale ex DePriest & B.W.Hale (1998)
- Parmotrema indicum Hale (1977) – India
- Parmotrema inexspectatum (Abbayes) Hale (1974)
- Parmotrema insuetum (Kurok.) Hale (1974)
- Parmotrema internexum (Nyl.) Hale ex DePriest & B.W.Hale (1998)
- Parmotrema iringense Krog (2000)
- Parmotrema isidioinsuetum Elix (1995)

== J ==
- Parmotrema jacarandicola (Krog & Swinscow) Krog & Swinscow (1983)
- Parmotrema judithae Elix & J.Johnst. (1988)

== K ==
- Parmotrema kahuziense Sérus. (1984)
- Parmotrema kainantum Kurok. & K.H.Moon (1998)
- Parmotrema kaisenikianum (Kurok.) Streimann (1986)
- Parmotrema kamatii Patw. & Prabhu (1977) – India
- Parmotrema kwalense (Krog & Swinscow) Krog & Swinscow (1983)

== L ==
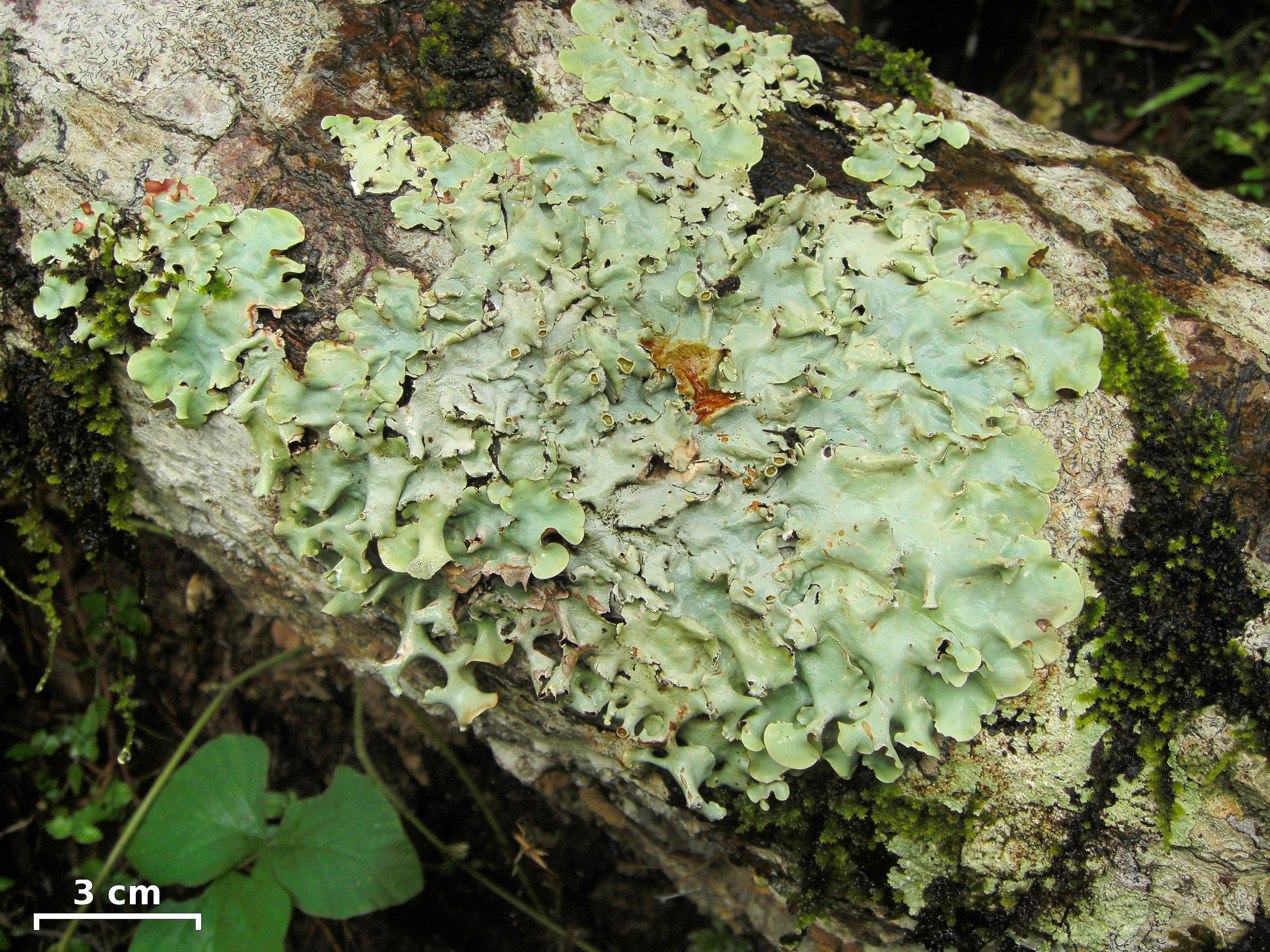
Parmotrema latissimum

- Parmotrema laciniatulum Krog (1991)
- Parmotrema laciniellum (L.I.Ferraro & Elix) O.Blanco, A.Crespo, Divakar, Elix & Lumbsch (2005)
- Parmotrema lacteum Marcelli & Spielmann (2007) – Brazil
- Parmotrema laeve (J.D.Zhao) J.B.Chen & Elix (2005)
- Parmotrema lambinonii Sérus. (1984)
- Parmotrema lambleyi Elix (1995)
- Parmotrema laongii (Lynge) Marcelli & Jungbluth (2007)
- Parmotrema larense López-Fig. (1979)
- Parmotrema latissimum (Fée) Hale (1974)
- Parmotrema lawreyi Bungartz & Spielmann (2019)
- Parmotrema leonis (Krog & Swinscow) Krog & Swinscow (1983)
- Parmotrema lichexanthonicum Eliasaro & Adler (1997)
- Parmotrema lividotessellatum (Hue) A.A.Spielm. & Marcelli (2020)
- Parmotrema lobulascens (J.Steiner) Hale (1974)
- Parmotrema lobulatum Marcelli & Hale (1990) – Brazil
- Parmotrema lobuliferum (C.H.Ribeiro & Marcelli) O.Blanco, A.Crespo, Divakar, Elix & Lumbsch (2005)
- Parmotrema lopezii Hale (1977) – Venezuela
- Parmotrema lophogenum (Abbayes) Hale (1974)
- Parmotrema louisianae (Hale) Hale (1974)
- Parmotrema luminosum Marcelli (2002)
- Parmotrema lyngeanum (Zahlbr.) Hale (1974)

== M ==
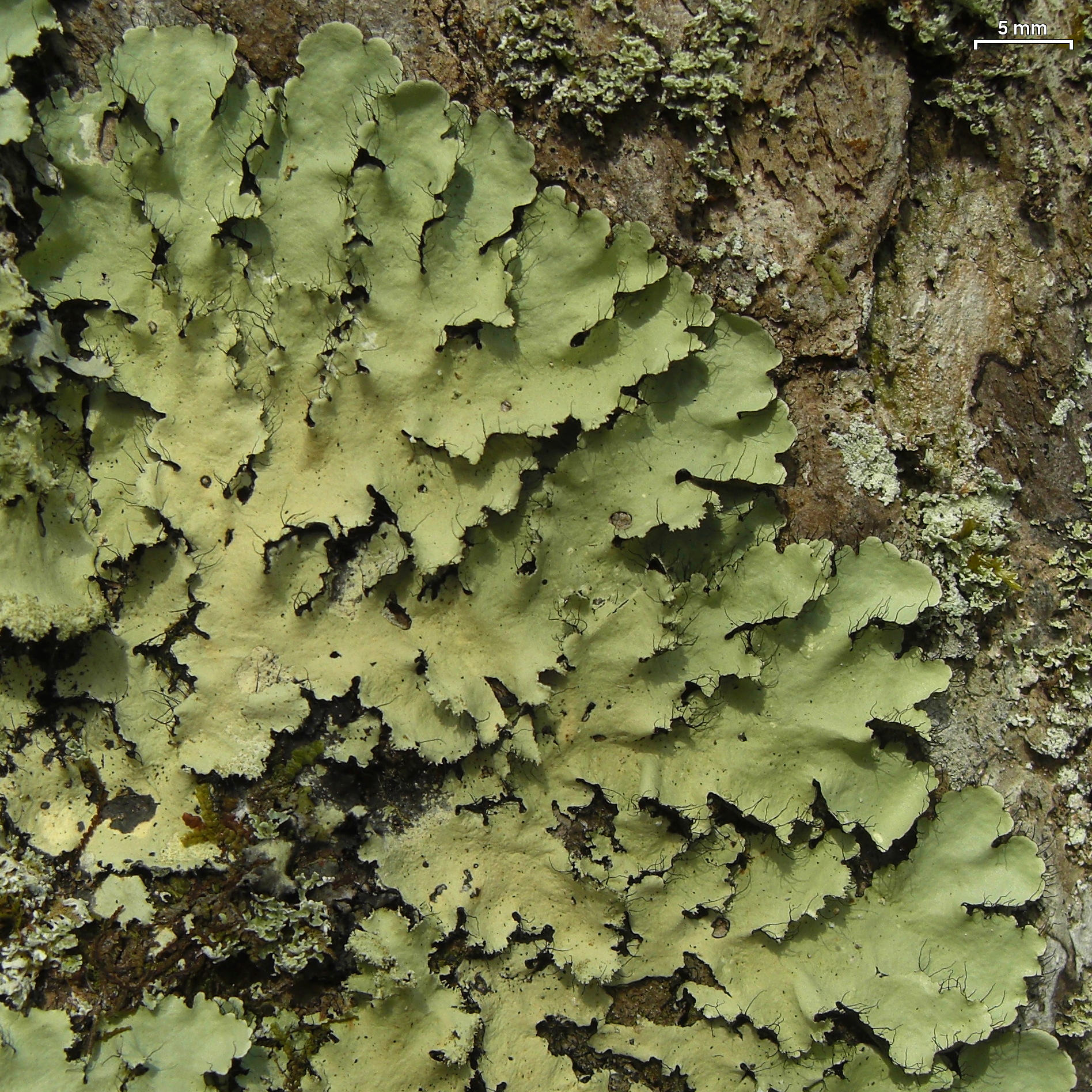
Parmotrema madagascariaceum

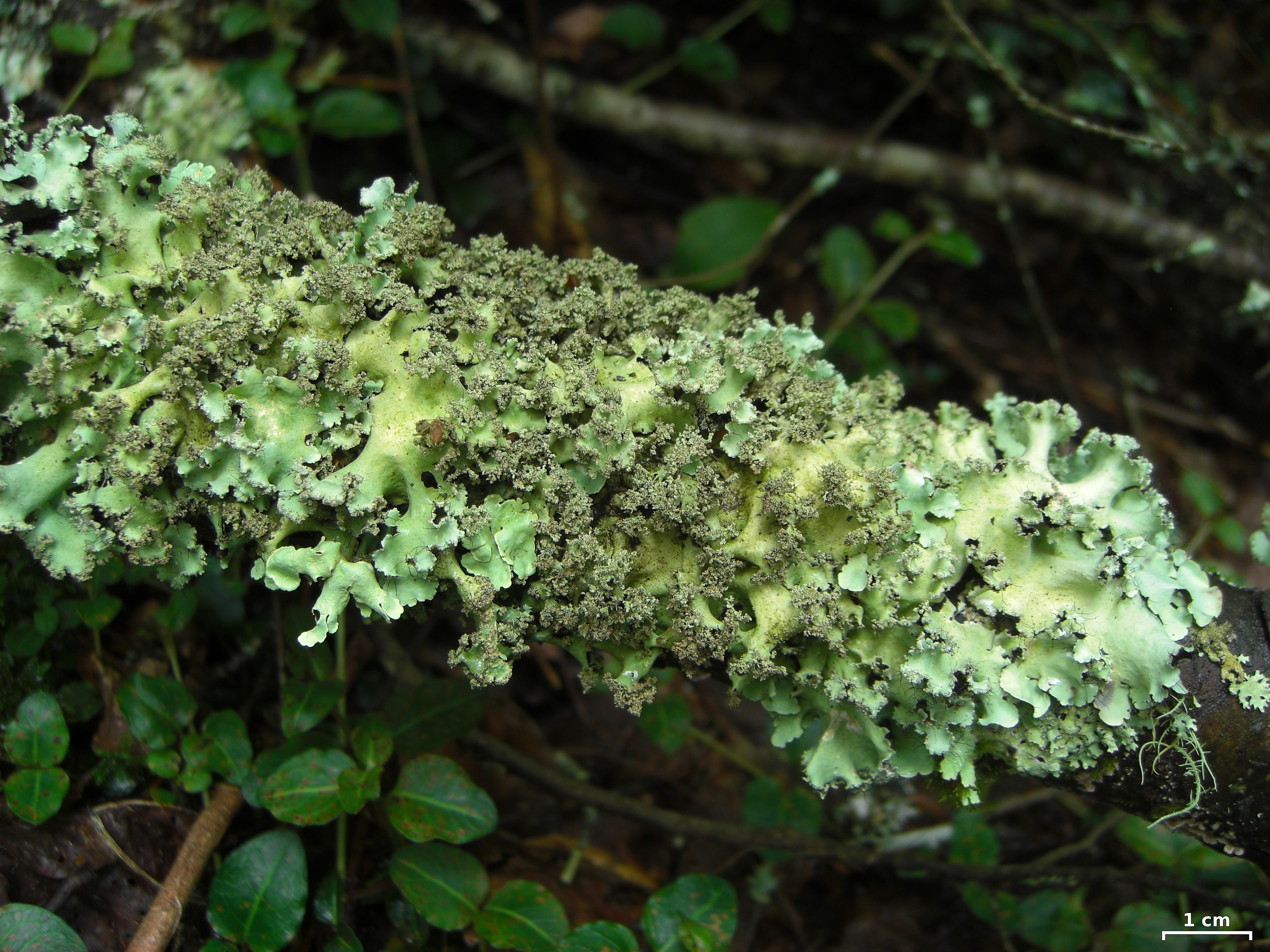
Parmotrema mellissii

- Parmotrema machupicchuense Kurok. (1998)
- Parmotrema maclayanum (Müll.Arg.) Hale (1974)
- Parmotrema macrocarpum (Pers.) Hale (1974)
- Parmotrema madagascariaceum (Hue) Hale (1974)
- Parmotrema madilynae A.Fletcher (1986) – Brazil
- Parmotrema magnum (Lynge) A.A.Spielm. & Marcelli (2020)
- Parmotrema mantiqueirense Hale (1990) – Brazil
- Parmotrema maraense Hale (1990) – Brazil
- Parmotrema marcellianum Spielmann & Bungartz (2019)
- Parmotrema marcellii A.C.L.Gerlach & Eliasaro (2014)
- Parmotrema margaritatum (Hue) Hale (1974)
- Parmotrema masonii L.I.Ferraro (1979)
- Parmotrema matudae (Kurok.) Hale ex DePriest & B.W.Hale (1998)
- Parmotrema maximum (Hue) A.A.Spielm. & Marcelli (2020)
- Parmotrema melanochaetum (Kurok.) O.Blanco, A.Crespo, Divakar, Elix & Lumbsch (2005)
- Parmotrema melanothrix (Mont.) Hale (1974)
- Parmotrema mellissii (C.W.Dodge) Hale (1974)
- Parmotrema menyamyaense Louwhoff & Elix (1999) – Papua New Guinea
- Parmotrema merrillii (Vain.) Hale (1974)
- Parmotrema mesogenes (Nyl.) Hale (1974)
- Parmotrema mesotropum (Müll. Arg.) Hale (1974)
- Parmotrema milanezii Marcelli, Benatti & Elix (2008) – Brazil
- Parmotrema mirandum (Hale) Hale (1974)
- Parmotrema mordenii (Hale) Hale (1974)
- Parmotrema moreliense (B. de Lesd.) W.L.Culb. & C.F.Culb. (1981)
- Parmotrema muelleri (Vain.) O.Blanco, A.Crespo, Divakar, Elix & Lumbsch (2005)
- Parmotrema myelochroum (Hale) Hale (1974)
- Parmotrema myriolobulatum (J.D.Zhao) J.C.Wei (1991)

== N ==
- Parmotrema nanfongense (Kurok.) DePriest & B.W.Hale (1998)
- Parmotrema naonii Elix (1997) – Papua New Guinea (1997)
- Parmotrema natalense (J.Steiner & Zahlbr.) Hale (1974)
- Parmotrema negrosorientalum Elix & Schumm (2001)
- Parmotrema neocaledonicum (Nyl.) Elix (1977)
- Parmotrema neodiffractaicum Egan (2016)
- Parmotrema neolobulascens (Winnem) Hale (1977)
- Parmotrema neopustulatum Kurok. (2006)
- Parmotrema neosticticum Kurok. (2006)
- Parmotrema neosubcrinitum C.H.Ribeiro & Marcelli (1992) – Brazil
- Parmotrema neotropicum Kurok. ex Hale (1977) – Southern United States; Cuba; Mexico
- Parmotrema nilgherrense (Nyl.) Hale (1974)
- Parmotrema norsticticatum (G.N.Stevens) A.Crespo, Divakar & Elix (2010)
- Parmotrema nudum (Hue) A.A.Spielm. & Marcelli (2020)
- Parmotrema nylanderi (Lynge) Hale (1976)

== O ==
- Parmotrema ochrocrinitum Elix & J.Johnst. (1988)
- Parmotrema ochroglaucum (Hale) Hale (1974)
- Parmotrema ornatulum (Hale) Hale (1974)
- Parmotrema overeemii (Zahlbr.) Elix (1988)

== P ==
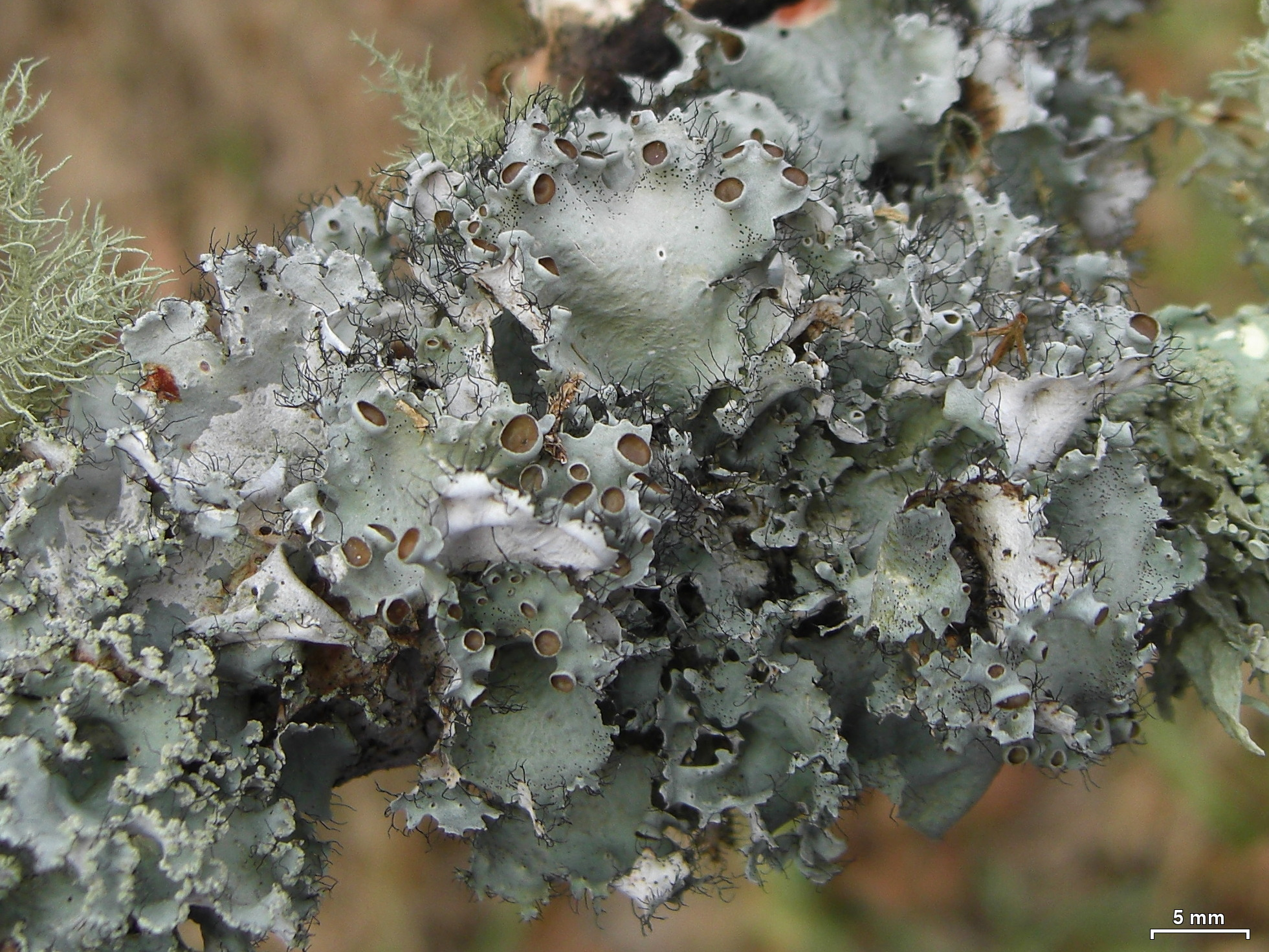
Parmotrema perforatum

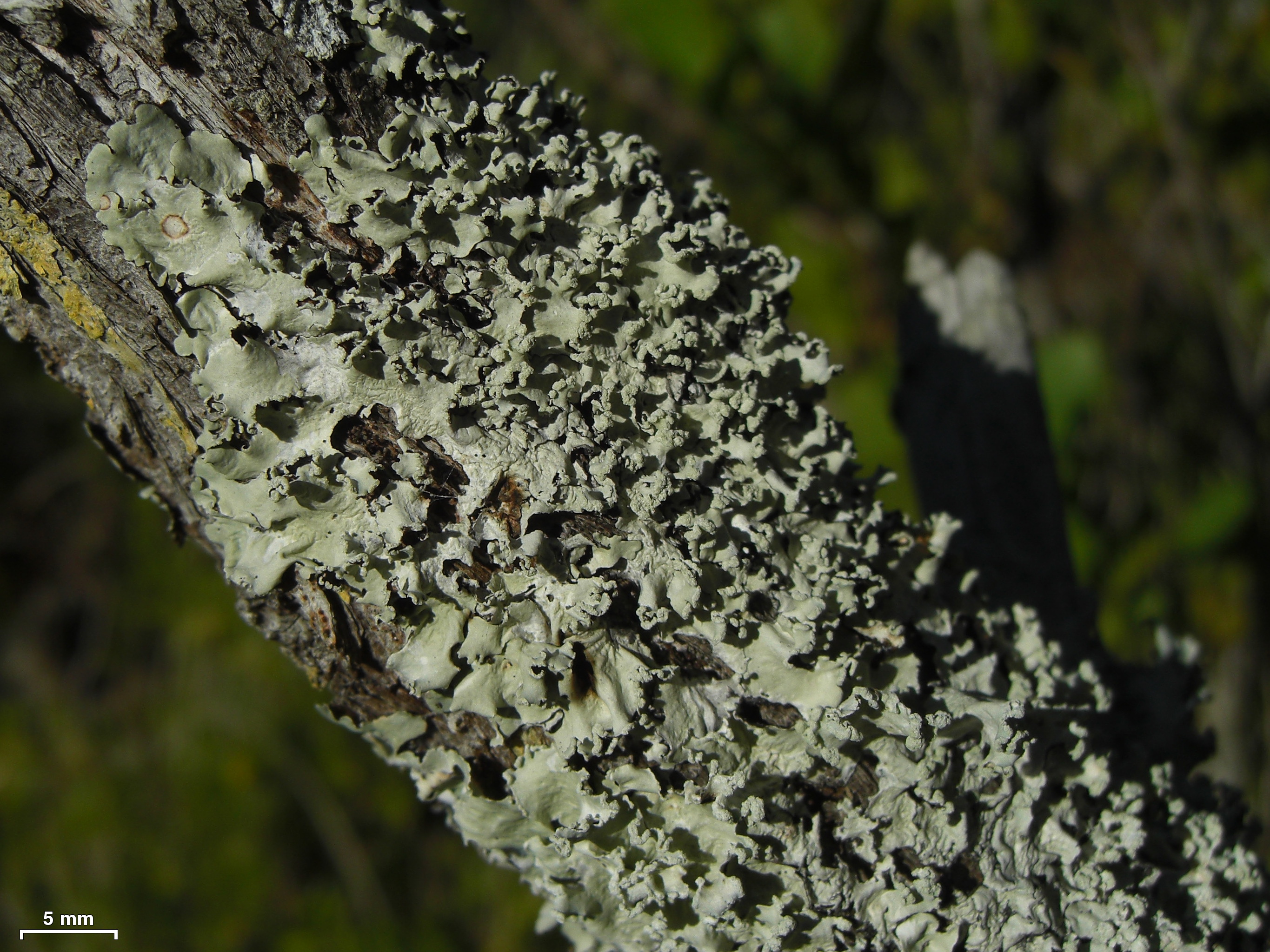
Parmotrema praesorediosum

- Parmotrema pachydermum (Hue) O.Blanco, A.Crespo, Divakar, Elix & Lumbsch (2005)
- Parmotrema pacificum (Kurok.) Kurok. (1991)
- Parmotrema pancheri (Hue) Hale (1974)
- Parmotrema paracrinitum Elix (2007)
- Parmotrema paraense Hale (1990) – Brazil
- Parmotrema parahypotropum (W.L.Culb.) Hale (1974)
- Parmotrema paramoreliense W.L.Culb. & C.F.Culb. (1981)
- Parmotrema pardi (Krog & Swinscow) Krog & Swinscow (1983)
- Parmotrema paulense (Zahlbr.) Hale (1974)
- Parmotrema pectinatum Jungbluth & Marcelli (2007) – Brazil
- Parmotrema peralbidum (Hale) Hale (1974)
- Parmotrema perforatum (Jacq.) A.Massal. (1860)
- Parmotrema perlatum (Huds.) M.Choisy (1952)
- Parmotrema permaculatum (Hale) Kurok. (2001)
- Parmotrema permutatum (Stirt.) Hale (1974)
- Parmotrema petropoliense (Zahlbr.) A.A.Spielm. & Marcelli (2020)
- Parmotrema pigmentiferum (Krog & Swinscow) Krog & Swinscow (1983)
- Parmotrema pigmentosum Hale (1990) – Brazil
- Parmotrema pilosum (Stizenb.) Krog & Swinscow (1983)
- Parmotrema planatilobatum (Hale) Hale (1974)
- Parmotrema platyphyllinum (Vain.) Elix (1998)
- Parmotrema pontagrossense (Eliasaro & Adler) O.Blanco, A.Crespo, Divakar, Elix & Lumbsch (2005)
- Parmotrema poolii (C.W.Dodge) Krog & Swinscow (1983)
- Parmotrema praeinsuetum (Kurok.) Louwhoff & Elix (1999)
- Parmotrema praeisidiosum Fleig (1999) – Brazil
- Parmotrema praesorediosum (Nyl.) Hale (1974)
- Parmotrema preperforatum (W.L.Culb.) Hale (1974)
- Parmotrema procerum (J.Steiner & Zahlbr.) Hale (1974)
- Parmotrema progenes Hale (1977) – Brazil; Peru; San Martin
- Parmotrema protolobulatum C.H.Ribeiro & Marcelli (1992) – Brazil
- Parmotrema pseudeunetum Sérus. (1984)
- Parmotrema pseudobreviciliatum Adler, Elix & Hale (1989) – Argentina
- Parmotrema pseudocrinitum (Abbayes) Hale (1974)
- Parmotrema pseudoexquisitum Michlig, Elix & L.I.Ferraro (2014)
- Parmotrema pseudograyanum (Hale) Sérus. (1984)
- Parmotrema pseudonilgherrense (Asahina) Hale (1977)
- Parmotrema pseudoreticulatum (Tav.) Hale (1974)
- Parmotrema pseudotinctorum (Abbayes) Hale (1974)
- Parmotrema pustulatum Louwhoff & Elix (2000) – New Caledonia
- Parmotrema pustulotinctum Spielmann & Bungartz (2019)
- Parmotrema pycnidiocarpum Benatti, Marcelli & Elix (2011)

== Q ==
- Parmotrema queenslandense Elix (1986) – Australia

== R ==
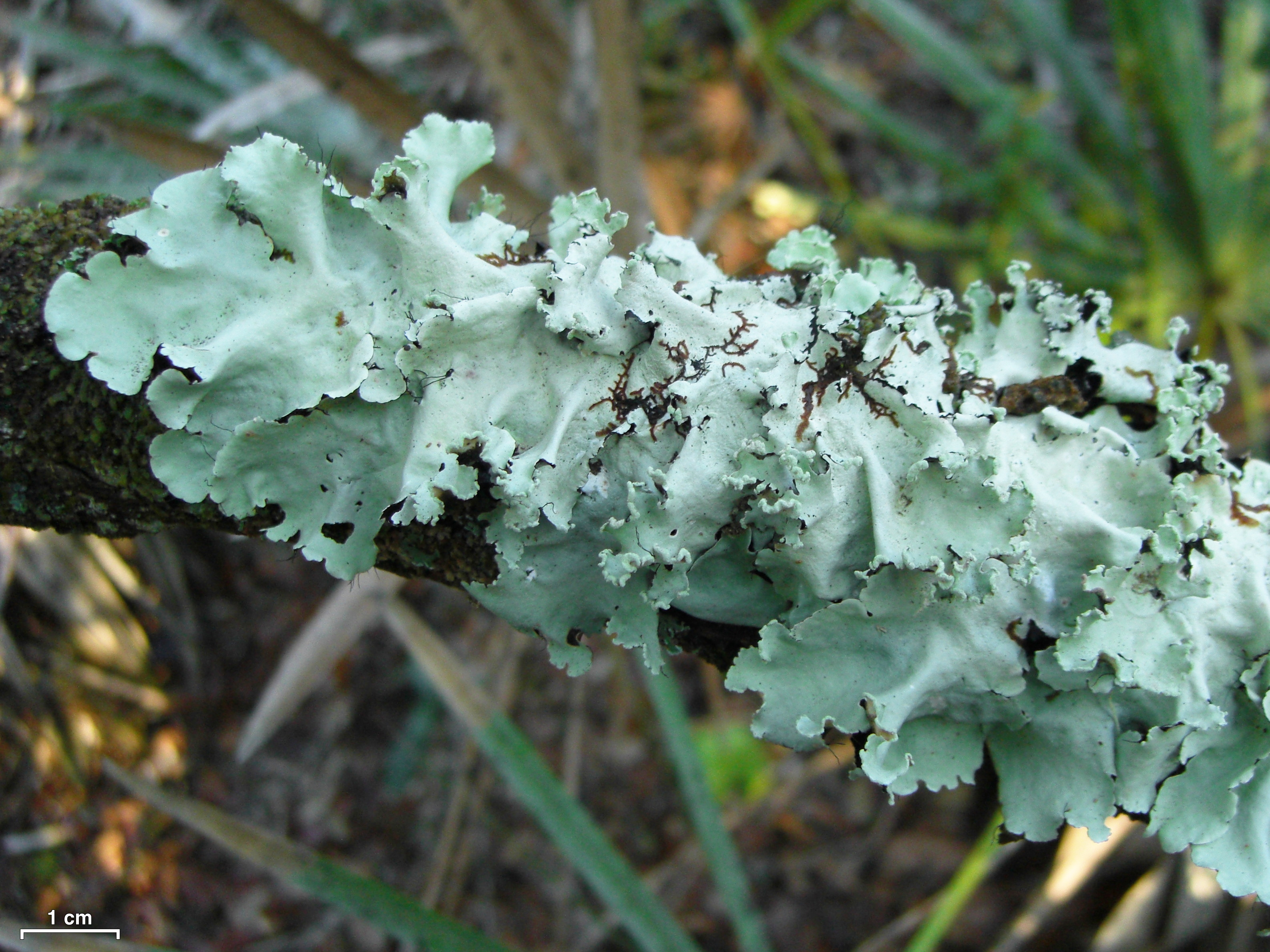
Parmotrema rampoddense

- Parmotrema radiatum (Lynge) A.A.Spielm. & Marcelli (2020)
- Parmotrema ramescens (Zahlbr.) O.Blanco, A.Crespo, Divakar, Elix & Lumbsch (2005)
- Parmotrema rampoddense (Nyl.) Hale (1974)
- Parmotrema ramusculum (Hale) Hale (1974)
- Parmotrema ravum (Krog & Swinscow) Sérus. (1983)
- Parmotrema recipiendum (Nyl.) Hale (1974)
- Parmotrema reitzii Hale (1977) – Brazil; Venezuela
- Parmotrema reparatum (Stirt.) O.Blanco, A.Crespo, Divakar, Elix & Lumbsch (2005)
- Parmotrema restingense Marcelli, Benatti & Elix (2010) – Brazil
- Parmotrema reterimulosum (J.Steiner & Zahlbr.) A.A.Spielm. & Marcelli (2020)
- Parmotrema reticulatum (Taylor) M.Choisy (1952)
- Parmotrema rigidum (Lynge) Hale (1974)
- Parmotrema rimulosum (C.W.Dodge) Hale (1974)
- Parmotrema robustum (Degel.) Hale (1974)
- Parmotrema rubifaciens (Hale) Hale (1974)
- Parmotrema rubromarginatum Elix & Pooprang (1999) – Thailand
- Parmotrema ruminatum (Zahlbr.) O.Blanco, A.Crespo, Divakar, Elix & Lumbsch (2005)
- Parmotrema ruptum (Lynge) Hale ex DePriest & B.W.Hale (1998)

== S ==
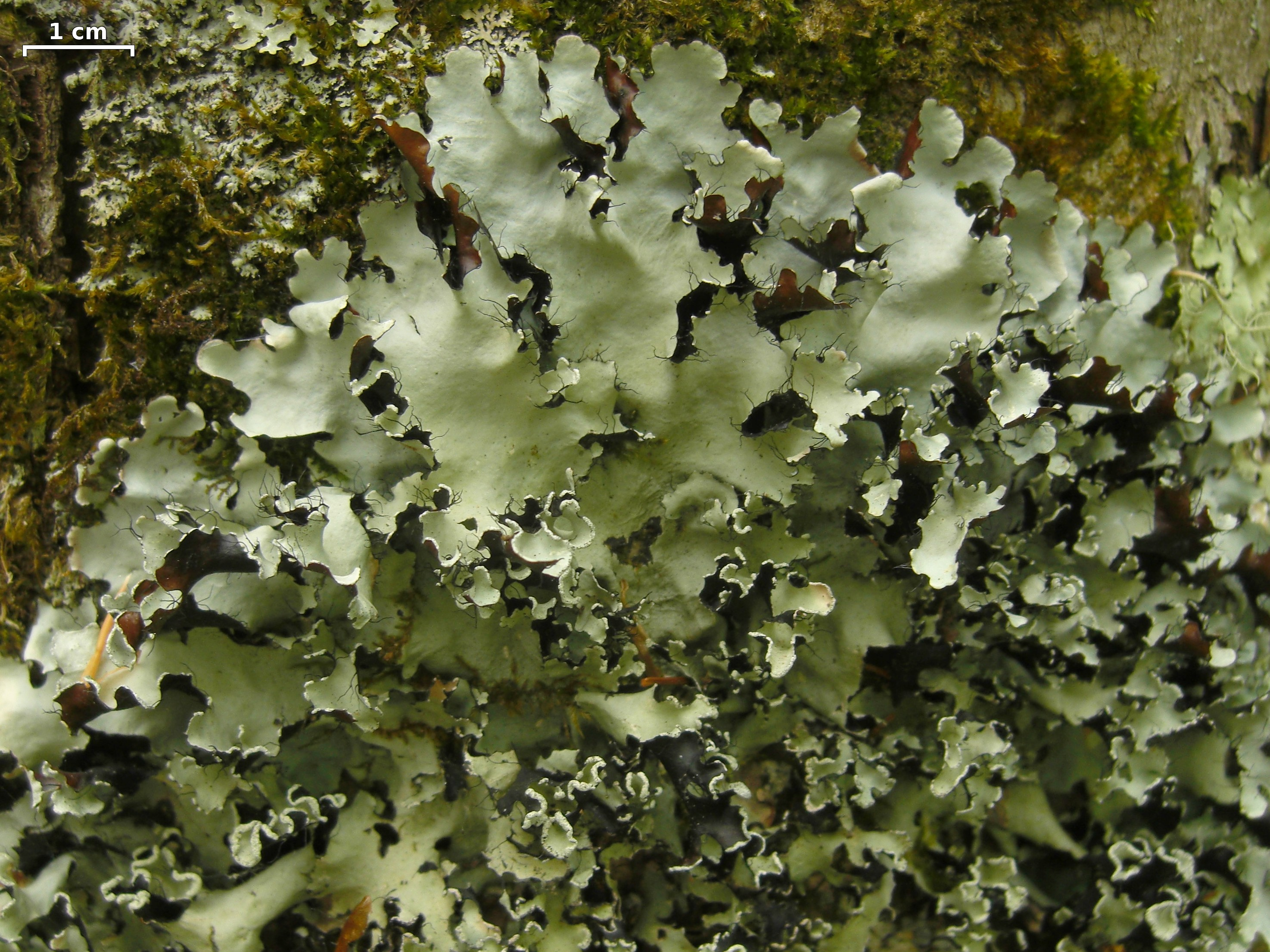
Parmotrema stuppeum

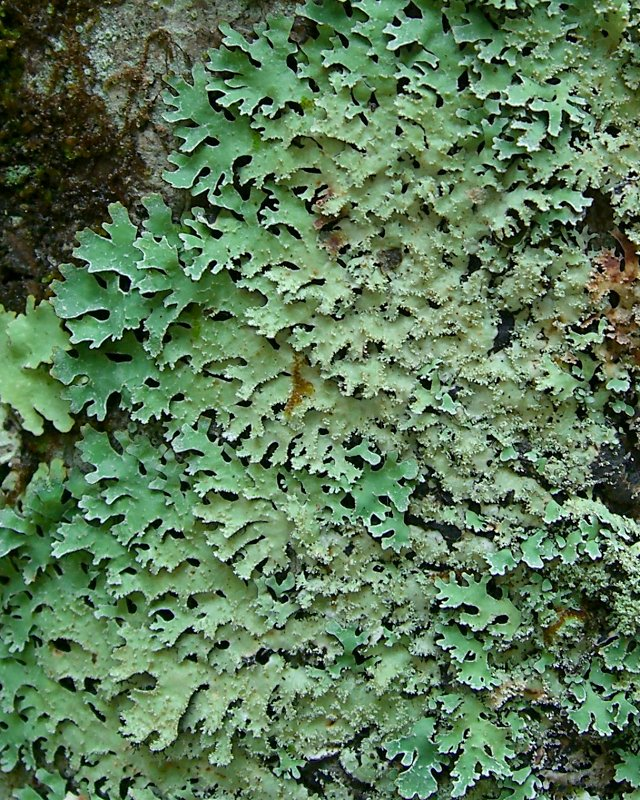
Parmotrema subisidiosum

- Parmotrema saccatilobum (Taylor) Hale (1974)
- Parmotrema sampaioi Paz-Berm. & Elix (2004)
- Parmotrema sanctae-candidae Eliasaro (2009) – Brazil
- Parmotrema sanctiangelii (Lynge) Hale (1974)
- Parmotrema sarrameanum Louwhoff & Elix (2000) – New Caledonia
- Parmotrema saxoisidiatum Spielmann & Bungartz (2019)
- Parmotrema schindleri Hale (1986) – Brazil
- Parmotrema screminiae A.A.Spielm. & Canêz (2016) – Brazil
- Parmotrema setchellii (Vain.) Hale (1974)
- Parmotrema sieberi (C.W.Dodge) A.A.Spielm. & Marcelli (2020)
- Parmotrema sorediiferum Hale (1986) – Venezuela
- Parmotrema soredioaliphaticum Estrabou & Adler (1998) – Argentina
- Parmotrema sorediosulphuratum Eliasaro & Donha (2006) – Brazil
- Parmotrema soyauxii (Müll.Arg.) Hale (1974)
- Parmotrema spilotum (Hale) Hale (1974)
- Parmotrema spinibarbe (Kurok.) Hale ex DePriest & B.W.Hale (1998)
- Parmotrema stenopteris (Kurok.) Hale ex DePriest & B.W.Hale (1998)
- Parmotrema sticticum (Louwhoff & Elix) O.Blanco, A.Crespo, Divakar, Elix & Lumbsch (2005)
- Parmotrema stuhlmannii (C.W.Dodge) Krog & Swinscow (1983)
- Parmotrema stuppeum (Taylor) Hale (1974)
- Parmotrema subarnoldii (Abbayes) Hale (1974)
- Parmotrema subcaperatum (Kremp.) Hale (1974)
- Parmotrema subcoloratum (Hale) Hale (1974)
- Parmotrema subcompositum Hale (1977) – Africa
- Parmotrema subcorallinum (Hale) Hale (1974)
- Parmotrema subhanningtonianum Sérus. (1984)
- Parmotrema subisidiosum (Müll. Arg.) Hale (1974)
- Parmotrema sublatifolium (J.D.Zhao, L.W.Hsu & Z.M.Sun) J.C.Wei (1991)
- Parmotrema submarginale (Michx.) DePriest & B.W.Hale (1998)
- Parmotrema submoreliense Egan (2016)
- Parmotrema subochraceum Hale (1990) – Brazil
- Parmotrema subpallescens (Kurok.) Kurok. (1991)
- Parmotrema subrigidum Egan (2005)
- Parmotrema subrugatum (Kremp.) Hale (1974)
- Parmotrema subschimperi (Hale) Hale (1974)
- Parmotrema subsumptum (Nyl.) Hale (1974)
- Parmotrema subthomsonii (D.D.Awasthi) A.Crespo, Divakar & Elix (2010)
- Parmotrema subtropicum (J.D.Zhao) J.C.Wei (1991)
- Parmotrema succinreticulatum (Eliasaro & Adler) O.Blanco, A.Crespo, Divakar, Elix & Lumbsch (2005)
- Parmotrema sulphuratum (Nees & Flot.) Hale (1974)
- Parmotrema superaguiense Donha & Eliasaro (2006) – Brazil

== T ==
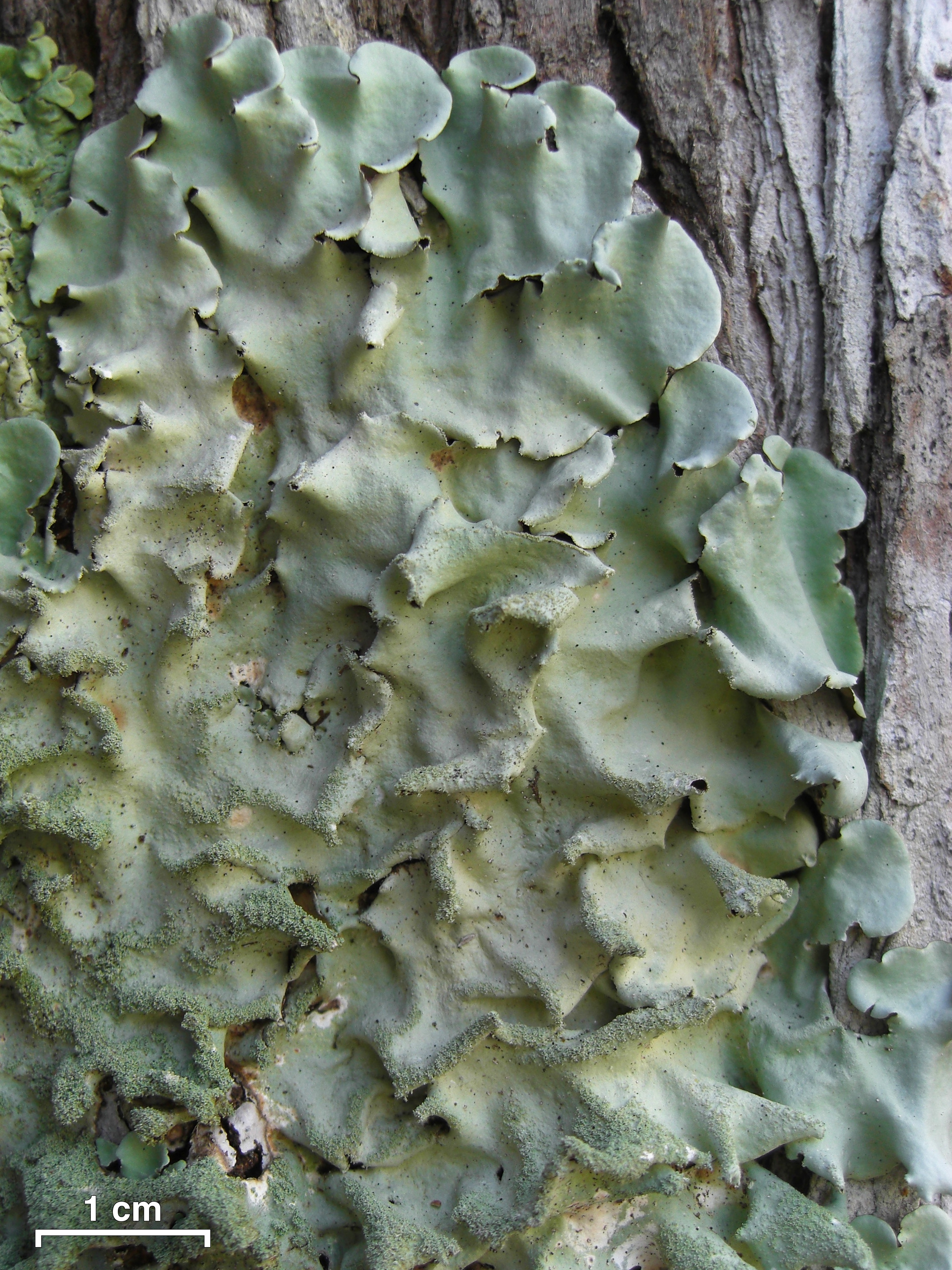
Parmotrema tinctorum

- Parmotrema taitae (Krog & Swinscow) Krog & Swinscow (1983)
- Parmotrema tandilense (Adler & Elix) O.Blanco, A.Crespo, Divakar, Elix & Lumbsch (2005)
- Parmotrema thailandicum Elix & Pooprang (1999) – Thailand
- Parmotrema thomsonii (Stirt.) A.Crespo, Divakar & Elix (2010)
- Parmotrema tinctorum (Despr. ex Nyl.) Hale (1974)
- Parmotrema tongaense Elix (1996) – Tonga
- Parmotrema tsavoënse (Krog & Swinscow) Krog & Swinscow (1983)

== U ==
- Parmotrema uberrimum (Hue) Hale (1974)
- Parmotrema ultralucens (Krog) Hale (1974)
- Parmotrema umbrosum (Krog & Swinscow) Krog & Swinscow (1983)
- Parmotrema upretii Divakar (2003) – India
- Parmotrema uruguense (Kremp.) Hale (1974)

== V ==
- Parmotrema vartakii Hale (1977) – India
- Parmotrema ventanicum (Adler & Elix) O.Blanco, A.Crespo, Divakar, Elix & Lumbsch (2005)
- Parmotrema verrucisetosum Sipman (1992) – Guyana
- Parmotrema virescens Hale (1986) – Venezuela
- Parmotrema viridiflavum (Hale) Hale (1974)
- Parmotrema vividum (Krog & Swinscow) Krog & Swinscow (1987)

== W ==
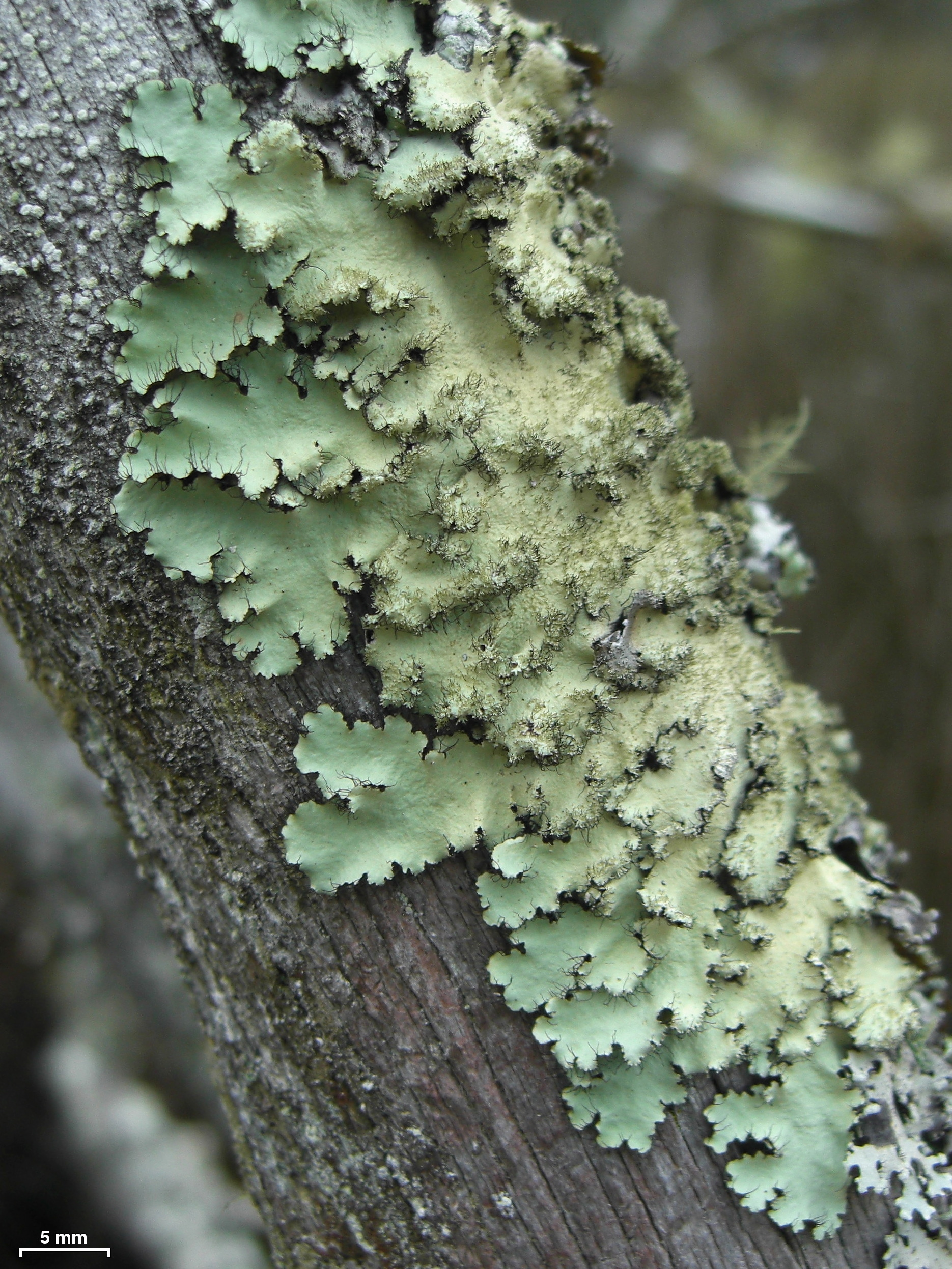
Parmotrema xanthinum

- Parmotrema wainii (A.L.Sm.) Hale (1974)
- Parmotrema warmingii (Vain.) A.A.Spielm. & Marcelli (2020)
- Parmotrema weberi Hale ex Spielmann & Bungartz (2019)
- Parmotrema wirthii Hale (1990) – Brazil
- Parmotrema wrightii L.I.Ferraro & Elix (1993) – Brazil

== X ==
- Parmotrema xanthinum (Müll.Arg.) Hale (1974)
- Parmotrema xanthopustulatum Elix & T.H.Nash (2002)

== Y ==
- Parmotrema yodae (Kurok.) Hale (1977)
- Parmotrema yunnanum (Sheng L.Wang, J.B.Chen & Elix) Marcelli & Benatti (2010)

== Z ==
- Parmotrema zicoi Marcelli & C.H.Ribeiro (2002) – Brazil
- Parmotrema zimbabwense (Hale) Kirika, Divakar & Lumbsch (2016)
- Parmotrema zollingeri (Hepp) Hale (1974)
