= Parmotrema albinatum =

Scientific classification
- Domain: Eukaryota
- Kingdom: Fungi
- Division: Ascomycota
- Class: Lecanoromycetes
- Order: Lecanorales
- Family: Parmeliaceae
- Genus: Parmotrema
- Species: P. albinatum

Binomial name
- Parmotrema albinatum (K.H.Moon, Kurok. & Kashiw.) O.Blanco, A.Crespo, Divakar, Elix & Lumbsch (2005)

Synonyms
- Rimelia albinata K.H.Moon, Kurok. & Kashiw. (2001)

Species of lichen

Parmotrema albinatum is a species of foliose lichen in the family Parmeliaceae that is found in Hawaii. It was originally described in 2001 as Rimelia albinata. Later phylogenetic analysis demonstrated that the genus Rimelia was synonymous with Parmotrema, so this species was transferred to that genus. The lichen is characterized by the sorediate and short-lacinulate (containing glands) thallus with salazinic acid in the medulla and traces of lobaric acid. The upper surface of the thallus is whitish, which probably a result of the thickness of the thick upper cortex.

== See also ==
- List of Parmotrema species
