= Parmotrema cactacearum =

Scientific classification
- Domain: Eukaryota
- Kingdom: Fungi
- Division: Ascomycota
- Class: Lecanoromycetes
- Order: Lecanorales
- Family: Parmeliaceae
- Genus: Parmotrema
- Species: P. cactacearum

Binomial name
- Parmotrema cactacearum Bungartz & Spielmann (2019)

Species of lichen

Parmotrema cactacearum is a rare species of corticolous (bark-dwelling), foliose lichen in the family Parmeliaceae. Found on the Galápagos Islands, it was formally described as a new species in 2019 by lichenologists Frank Bungartz and Adriano Spielmann. The type specimen was collected from Pinta Island at an altitude of 289 m (948 ft), where it was found growing on an old cactus pad in an open woodland. It is only known from the type specimen. The species epithet refers to its substrate.

== Description ==
The upper thallus surface of Parmotrema cactacearum is dull, immaculate, and pale greenish yellow, without cracks, and can be sparsely to abundantly isidiate. The cylindrical isidia are mostly simple to sparsely branched, 0.05–0.1 mm in diameter, and concolorous with the thallus, except for their dark brown tips. The lobes are small to moderate-sized, angular, and more or less flattened, with sparsely to abundantly ciliate margins, with short and stout black cilia that are mostly simple, rarely branched and typically 0.2–0.5 mm long. The lower surface is often blackened throughout or becoming dark brown towards the margin, typically with a rhizine-free 0.5–1 mm marginal zone, and with short and stout black rhizines, mostly simple, rarely sparsely branched. The medulla is white. Neither apothecia nor pycnidia have been observed in this species.

The cortex contains usnic acid, while the medulla has protocetraric acid. The expected results of standard chemical spot tests in the cortex are P−,K−, KC± (yellowish-brown), and in the medulla P+ (yellow quickly turning red), K+ (yellowish-brown), KC−, C−, UV−.

== See also ==
- List of Parmotrema species
