= Parmotrema adspersum =

Scientific classification
- Domain: Eukaryota
- Kingdom: Fungi
- Division: Ascomycota
- Class: Lecanoromycetes
- Order: Lecanorales
- Family: Parmeliaceae
- Genus: Parmotrema
- Species: P. adspersum

Binomial name
- Parmotrema adspersum (Vain.) Elix (2002)

Synonyms
- Canoparmelia adspersa (Vain.) Elix & Hale (1986); Parmelia adspersa Vain. (1907); Pseudoparmelia adspersa (Vain.) Hale (1974)

Species of lichen

Parmotrema adspersum is a species of lichen in the family Parmeliaceae. It was originally described as a species of Parmelia by Edvard August Vainio in 1907. John Elix transferred it to Parmotrema in 2002, reasoning that its thick-walled ascospores (measuring 16–18 by 6–8 μm) are typical of that genus. Parmotrema adspersum is common in Thailand and the Philippines.

== See also ==
- List of Parmotrema species
