= Parmotrema circinatum =

Scientific classification
- Kingdom: Fungi
- Division: Ascomycota
- Class: Lecanoromycetes
- Order: Lecanorales
- Family: Parmeliaceae
- Genus: Parmotrema
- Species: P. circinatum

Binomial name
- Parmotrema circinatum Elix & R.W.Rogers (2004)
- Holotype: East Point, Mackay, Queensland, Australia

Species of lichen-forming fungus

Parmotrema circinatum is a species of foliose lichen in the family Parmeliaceae. It grows on twigs in open coastal woodland near Mackay in eastern Queensland, Australia. The lichen forms a greyish, leafy crust up to 8 cm across with distinctive coiled, densely branched lobes along its margins that lack the hair-like fringes found in related species. It is known only from its original collection site, roughly 100 metres from the shoreline.

== Taxonomy ==
Parmotrema circinatum was described as a new species by John Elix and Roderick Rogers on the basis of material collected near Mackay in coastal Queensland. The type specimen was gathered from twigs in open coastal woodland at East Point, about 100 m inland from the sea, and is housed in the Queensland Herbarium. In the protologue the authors compared the new species directly with Parmotrema merrillii and P. disparile, noting that all three share loosely to moderately attached, leathery thalli with finely cut (laciniate) lobe margins, a lack of isidia and soredia, and protocetraric acid in the medulla. They distinguished P. circinatum by its completely cilia-lacking lobes and its densely branched, coil-like marginal laciniae, whereas P. merrillii and P. disparile usually have at least sparse marginal cilia in the lobe axils and bear more or less simple, linear laciniae that are rarely or only weakly branched.

== Description ==
The thallus of Parmotrema circinatum is loosely to moderately attached to its substrate, with a tough, leathery texture and an overall diameter of up to about 8 cm. The lobes are somewhat irregular in outline with broadly rounded tips and are typically 5–10 mm wide. Their margins are entire to irregularly incised and soon develop conspicuous narrow side-lobes (laciniae) that give the thallus a finely cut appearance. These laciniae are 10–25 mm long and only 0.5–2 mm wide, initially dichotomously branched but then becoming repeatedly branched in a densely coralloid, often coil-like fashion; they are eciliate, lacking the marginal hair-like cilia that occur in many other Parmotrema species. The upper surface is mineral-grey, without spots (maculae), and becomes wrinkled (rugose) and cracked towards the centre of the thallus; it does not produce soredia or isidia. The medulla is white.

The lower surface is predominantly black and shiny, with a relatively broad, brown, rhizine-free marginal zone. Rhizines are very sparse, simple and short, and are largely confined to the central parts of the thallus. Fruiting bodies (apothecia) were not seen in the original material, but pycnidia are common; they appear as tiny immersed dots on the upper surface. These structures produce short, somewhat flask-shaped (sublageniform) conidia that are 6–9 μm long. In standard chemical spot tests, the cortex reacts K+ (yellow), and the medulla is K−, C−, KC+ (pink to red), and Pd+ (deep orange-red). These reactions indicate the presence of atranorin and chloroatranorin in the cortex, with protocetraric acid as the major medullary substance, together with virensic acid and traces of other unidentified compounds.

== Habitat and distribution ==
Parmotrema circinatum is known only from its type locality in eastern Queensland, Australia. It was collected on twigs in open coastal woodland at East Point near Mackay, roughly 100 m from the shoreline.

== See also ==
- List of Parmotrema species
