= Parmotrema amaniense =

Scientific classification
- Domain: Eukaryota
- Kingdom: Fungi
- Division: Ascomycota
- Class: Lecanoromycetes
- Order: Lecanorales
- Family: Parmeliaceae
- Genus: Parmotrema
- Species: P. amaniense

Binomial name
- Parmotrema amaniense (J.Steiner & Zahlbr.) Krog & Swinscow (1983)

Synonyms
- Parmelia amaniensis J.Steiner & Zahlbr. (1926)

Species of lichen

Parmotrema amaniense is a species of corticolous lichen in the family Parmeliaceae. Found in Africa, the lichen was originally described by J. Steiner and A. Zahlbruckner as a species of Parmelia in 1926. The holotype collection was made in Usambara (Tanzania) at an elevation of 800 metres (2,600 ft). Krog & Swinscow transferred the taxon to Parmotrema in 1983. Secondary chemicals present in Parmotrema amaniense include alectoronic acid, protocetraric acid, and atranorin. In addition to Tanzania, it has been recorded in Uganda, Angola, Malawi, Mozambique, Sierra Leone, Zambia, and Zimbabwe.

== See also ==
- List of Parmotrema species
