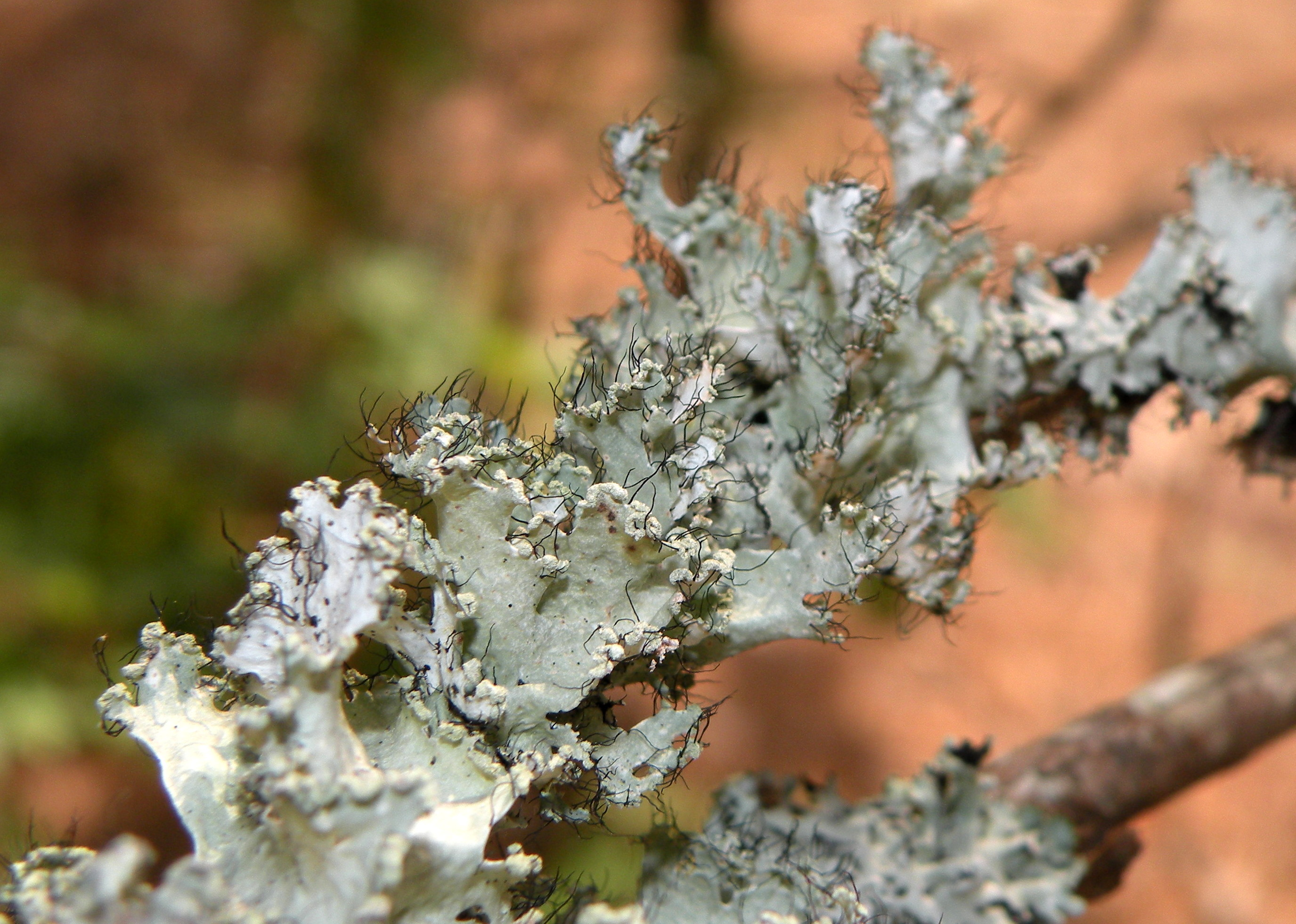

Conservation status
- Apparently Secure (NatureServe)

Scientific classification
- Kingdom: Fungi
- Division: Ascomycota
- Class: Lecanoromycetes
- Order: Lecanorales
- Family: Parmeliaceae
- Genus: Parmotrema
- Species: P. hypoleucinum

Binomial name
- Parmotrema hypoleucinum (J.Steiner) Hale (1974)

Synonyms
- Parmelia hypoleucina J.Steiner (1918)

= Parmotrema hypoleucinum =

Species of lichen

Parmotrema hypoleucinum is a species of foliose lichen in the family Parmeliaceae. A study of Parmotrema hypoleucinum in Tunisia revealed that it contains atranorin and (+)-iso-usnic acid, chemical compounds of interest for their anti-inflammatory activity. The species was originally scientifically described by Austrian lichenologist Julius Steiner in 1918 as a member of genus Parmelia. Mason Hale transferred it to Parmotrema in 1974.

== See also ==
- List of Parmotrema species
