= Parmotrema anchietanum =

Scientific classification
- Domain: Eukaryota
- Kingdom: Fungi
- Division: Ascomycota
- Class: Lecanoromycetes
- Order: Lecanorales
- Family: Parmeliaceae
- Genus: Parmotrema
- Species: P. anchietanum

Binomial name
- Parmotrema anchietanum Marcelli, Benatti & Elix (2008)

Species of lichen

Parmotrema anchietanum is a species of saxicolous lichen in the family Parmeliaceae. Found in South America, it was described as new to science in 2008. The holotype was collected on the rocky shore of Anchieta Island in São Paulo; the lichen is named after the type locality. Its leathery, pale grey thallus measures up to 16 cm (6.3 in) in diameter, composed of irregularly branched lobes that are typically 1–3 mm wide. Secondary compounds present in the lichen include atranorin and chloratranorin in the cortex, and salazinic acid and consalazinic acid in the medulla.

== See also ==
- List of Parmotrema species
