= Parmotrema asperum =

Scientific classification
- Domain: Eukaryota
- Kingdom: Fungi
- Division: Ascomycota
- Class: Lecanoromycetes
- Order: Lecanorales
- Family: Parmeliaceae
- Genus: Parmotrema
- Species: P. asperum

Binomial name
- Parmotrema asperum Benatti, Marcelli & Elix (2008)

Species of lichen

Parmotrema asperum is a species of saxicolous lichen in the family Parmeliaceae. Found in Brazil, it was described as new to science in 2008. The milky-grey thallus of the lichen is up to 11 centimetres (4.3 in) in diameter, consisting of irregularly branched lobes measuring 2.0–6.5 mm wide. The lichen is named for the coarse appearance of the thallus.

== See also ==
- List of Parmotrema species
