= Parmotrema aurantiacoparvum =

Scientific classification
- Domain: Eukaryota
- Kingdom: Fungi
- Division: Ascomycota
- Class: Lecanoromycetes
- Order: Lecanorales
- Family: Parmeliaceae
- Genus: Parmotrema
- Species: P. aurantiacoparvum

Binomial name
- Parmotrema aurantiacoparvum Sipman (1992)

Species of lichen

Parmotrema aurantiacoparvum is a species of corticolous lichen in the family Parmeliaceae. Found in South America, it was described as new to science in 1992 by lichenologist Harrie Sipman. Its thallus is pale grey or slightly brownish in colour, measuring 2–4 cm (0.8–1.6 in) wide. The lichen has been collected in Colombia, Guyana, French Guiana, Venezuela, and Brazil. It grows on canopy branches and on small trees in well-lit areas of forests or clearings.

== See also ==
- List of Parmotrema species
