= Parmotrema zicoi =

Scientific classification
- Domain: Eukaryota
- Kingdom: Fungi
- Division: Ascomycota
- Class: Lecanoromycetes
- Order: Lecanorales
- Family: Parmeliaceae
- Genus: Parmotrema
- Species: P. zicoi

Binomial name
- Parmotrema zicoi C.H.Ribeiro & Marcelli (2002)

Species of lichen

Parmotrema zicoi is a species of saxicolous lichen in the family Parmeliaceae. Found in Brazil, it was introduced as new to science in 2002.

== Taxonomy ==
It was originally described from collections made in Serra do Caraça, Brazil, where it was found growing at an elevation of 1,330 m (4,360 ft).

The specific epithet zicoi honours the priest Tobias Zico, who, as a former administrator for the Parque Natural do Caraça, promoted the "preservation of a most important type locality for numerous lichens, animals, and plants in Brazil".

== Description ==
The lichen has a seafoam-green thallus up to 8 cm (3 in) wide, comprising overlapping lobes that are 2.0–5.0 mm wide. The margins of the lobes have simple cilia that are up to 1 mm long. The cortex contains atranorin, while the medulla contains protocetraric acid. Occasionally, the medullary K spot test reaction is positive, producing a very light yellow colour that indicates the presence of traces of atranorin in the upper part of the medulla near the cortex. P. zicoi has short bacilliform-shaped conidia that are less than 5 μm long. The lichen does not produce any form of vegetative propagation or pustules.

== See also ==
- List of Parmotrema species
