= Parmotrema awasthii =

Scientific classification
- Kingdom: Fungi
- Division: Ascomycota
- Class: Lecanoromycetes
- Order: Lecanorales
- Family: Parmeliaceae
- Genus: Parmotrema
- Species: P. awasthii

Binomial name
- Parmotrema awasthii Divakar & Upreti (2003)

Species of lichen

Parmotrema awasthii is a little-known species of foliose lichen in the family Parmeliaceae. Found in India, it was described as new to science in 2003. The species grows on iron-rich rocks in the Western Ghats mountains of Karnataka at about 1650 metres elevation, where it forms leathery rosettes up to 7 cm across with grey upper surfaces and black hair-like projections along the edges. It is distinguished from similar species by its unique chemical composition and the presence of small blister-like swellings near the margins that split open but do not produce powdery propagules.

== Taxonomy ==
Parmotrema awasthii was introduced to science in 2003 by Pradeep Divakar and Dalip Upreti during a survey of Indian Parmotrema diversity. The holotype was collected at roughly 1650 m on iron-rich rock at Dattatryapetta in the Chikmagalur District of Karnataka. The authors placed the species in the salazinic acid lineage of Parmotrema but showed that its secondary metabolite profile—atranorin in the cortex with alectoronic and α-collatolic acids in the medulla—sets it apart from chemically related taxa. The epithet honours veteran Indian lichenologist Dharani Dhar Awasthi, whose fieldwork yielded the type material. Morphologically P. awasthii is closest to P. mellissii and P. kamatii, yet it differs by bearing marginal lobules and pustules that break open without producing soredia; both comparator species have true soralia and lack lobules. According to the authors, these distinctions, combined with its eciliate yet ciliate-lobulate margins and distinctive chemistry, justify recognition of a discrete species.

== Description ==
The thallus forms loosely attached, leathery rosettes up to about 7 cm across. Broad, rounded lobes (4–6 mm wide) dissect towards the tips into short side-lobules. Along the edges stand simple to forked black cilia 1–3 mm long—the lichen’s only "hair-like" projections. The upper surface is mineral grey, smooth and generally without the pale mottling (maculae) that many foliose lichens display; it carries neither soredia nor isidia, instead developing occasional pustules near the margins. These blister-like swellings split at their apex but never powder out, so the species relies on sexual or conidial reproduction that has yet to be observed. Internally the medulla is pure white; under ultraviolet light it fluoresces blue, reflecting the presence of alectoronic derivatives. Spot tests give a K+ (yellow) cortex reaction, while the medulla is UV+ (blue) and otherwise unreactive to C, KC or P reagents. Beneath, the thallus is black and faintly wrinkled, bordered by a 2–4 mm shiny brown zone that lacks rhizines. Holdfasts themselves are sparse, simple and restricted to the centre. Neither apothecia nor pycnidia were seen in the type collection, so spore dimensions remain unknown.

== Habitat and distribution ==
Parmotrema awasthii is a saxicolous lichen, growing directly on iron-rich, probably slightly acidic rock in an open montane setting. The type site at Dattatryapetta lies on the Bababudangiri massif of the Western Ghats, about 1650 m above sea level—a zone with seasonal mist and heavy monsoon rainfall. No additional localities have yet been reported, so the species is currently regarded as endemic to this single hillside outcrop. Whether it proves to be a narrow specialist of ferruginous rocks or is simply under-collected awaits further exploration of comparable habitats along the Ghats and adjacent Deccan highlands.

== See also ==
- List of Parmotrema species
