= Parmotrema pustulotinctum =

Scientific classification
- Domain: Eukaryota
- Kingdom: Fungi
- Division: Ascomycota
- Class: Lecanoromycetes
- Order: Lecanorales
- Family: Parmeliaceae
- Genus: Parmotrema
- Species: P. pustulotinctum

Binomial name
- Parmotrema pustulotinctum Spielmann & Bungartz (2019)

Species of lichen

Parmotrema pustulotinctum is a rare species of foliose lichen in the family Parmeliaceae. Found on the Galápagos Islands, it was formally described s a new species in 2019 by lichenologists Frank Bungartz and Adriano Spielmann. The type specimen was collected from Santiago Island at an altitude of 362 m (1,188 ft), where it was found growing on an exposed vertical boulder. It is only known from the type collection. The species epithet refers to its isidia, that are pustulate and readily distinguishable from those of the closely related P. tinctorum.

== Description ==
The upper surface of Parmotrema pustulotinctum is whitish gray to ivory, dull, and not shiny, while its surface is immaculate (without spots) and conspicuously wrinkled, gnarled, and granular. The lichen is abundantly isidiate, with isidia that are laminal and irregularly granular-globose, pustulate, and develop from the very irregular central surface. The lobes are broad, moderate-sized to large, and rotund, with incised axils and eciliate margins. The lower surface has a broad, pale to deep brown, rhizine-free margin that is about 3–5 mm wide and blackens and sparsely rhizinate towards the thallus centre. The rhizines are short, stout, and pale to dark brown or black, mostly simple, and rarely sparsely branched, often growing in clusters. The medulla is white. The lichen has neither apothecia nor pycnidia.

The cortex contains atranorin, while the medulla has lecanoric acid. The expected results of standard chemical spot tests in the cortex are P+ (yellow), K+ (yellow), KC−, C−, UV−; and in the medulla P−, K−, KC+ and C+ (briefly bright red), UV−.

== See also ==
- List of Parmotrema species
