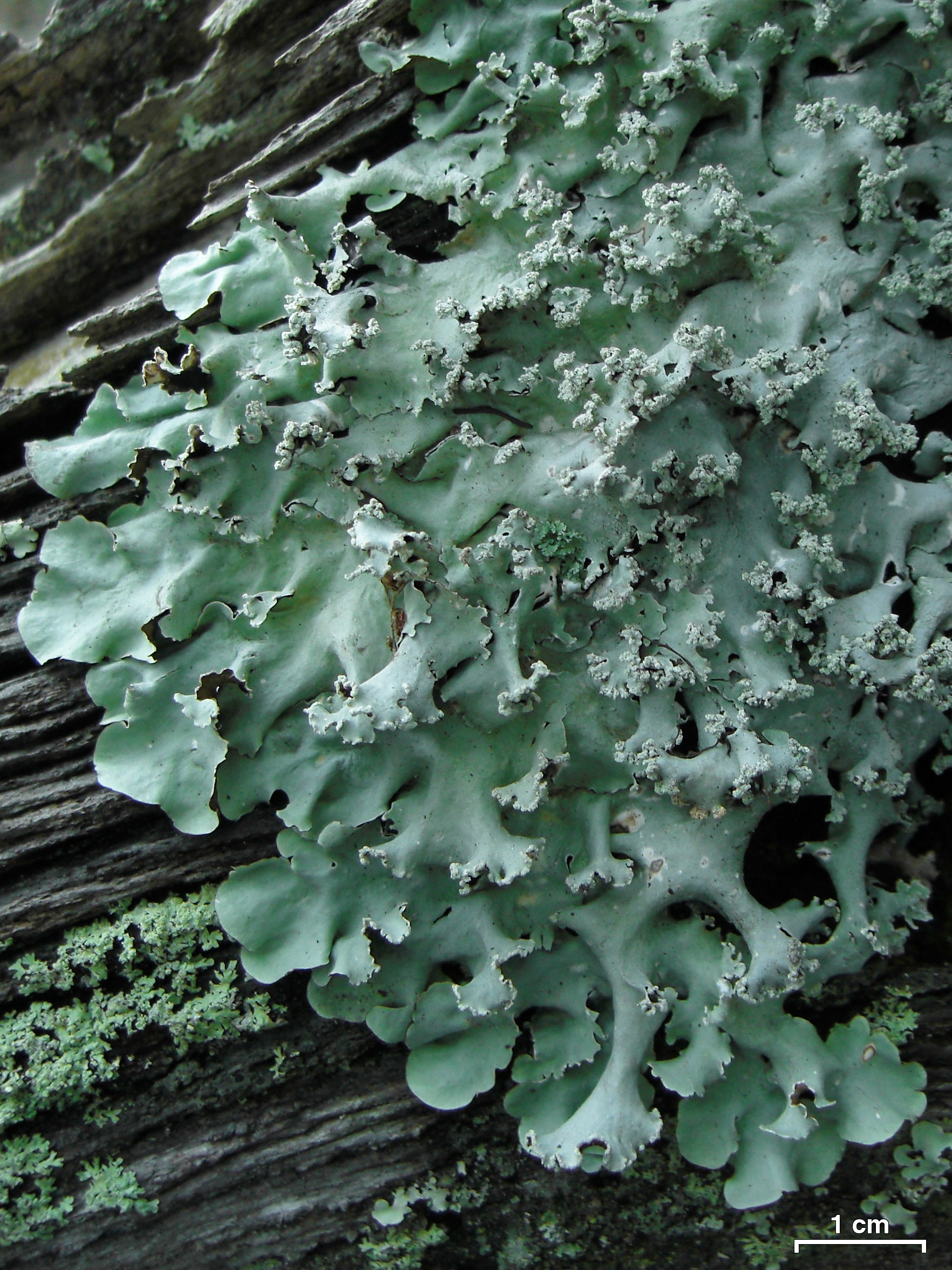

Conservation status
- Apparently Secure (NatureServe)

Scientific classification
- Kingdom: Fungi
- Division: Ascomycota
- Class: Lecanoromycetes
- Order: Lecanorales
- Family: Parmeliaceae
- Genus: Parmotrema
- Species: P. gardneri

Binomial name
- Parmotrema gardneri (C.W.Dodge) Sérus. (1984)

Synonyms
- Parmelia gardneri C.W.Dodge (1959)

= Parmotrema gardneri =

Species of lichen

Parmotrema gardneri is a species of foliose lichen in the family Parmeliaceae. It was first formally described in 1955 by Carroll William Dodge as Parmelia gardneri, from specimens collected in Brazil. Emmanuël Sérusiaux transferred it to the genus Parmotrema in 1984. In addition to South America, it is also found in Africa, Asia, and North America.

== See also ==
- List of Parmotrema species
