= Parmotrema amboimense =

Scientific classification
- Domain: Eukaryota
- Kingdom: Fungi
- Division: Ascomycota
- Class: Lecanoromycetes
- Order: Lecanorales
- Family: Parmeliaceae
- Genus: Parmotrema
- Species: P. amboimense

Binomial name
- Parmotrema amboimense (C.W.Dodge) Hale (1974)

Synonyms
- Parmelia amboimensis C.W.Dodge (1959)

Species of lichen

Parmotrema amboimense is a species of lichen in the family Parmeliaceae that is found in Africa. It was first described by Carroll William Dodge in 1959 as a species of Parmelia. Mason Hale transferred it to the genus Parmotrema in 1974. The type collection was made in Cuanza Sul Province (Angola), where it was found growing at an elevation of 1,000 m (3,300 ft); Dodge also noted the presence of the lichen in Cameroon and Uganda. Parmotrema amboimense has a pale olive-buff coloured thallus measuring up to 10 cm (4 in) in diameter.

== See also ==
- List of Parmotrema species
