= Parmotrema acrotrychum =

Scientific classification
- Kingdom: Fungi
- Division: Ascomycota
- Class: Lecanoromycetes
- Order: Lecanorales
- Family: Parmeliaceae
- Genus: Parmotrema
- Species: P. acrotrychum

Binomial name
- Parmotrema acrotrychum (Kurok.) Streimann (1986)

Synonyms
- Parmelia acrotrycha Kurok. (1979)

Species of lichen

Parmotrema acrotrychum is a species of lichen in the family Parmeliaceae. First discovered in Papua New Guinea, it was originally described in 1979 by Japanese lichenologist Syo Kurokawa as a species of Parmelia. Heinar Streimann transferred it to the genus Parmotrema in 1986. The lichen has also been found in Queensland (Australia) and Malaysia. It has been shown to contain a variety of secondary chemicals, including atranorin, fumarprotocetraric acid, succinprotocetraric acid, chloroatranorin, protocetraric acid, protolichesterinic acid, and lichesterinic acid.

== See also ==
- List of Parmotrema species
