= Parmotrema aberrans =

Scientific classification
- Domain: Eukaryota
- Kingdom: Fungi
- Division: Ascomycota
- Class: Lecanoromycetes
- Order: Lecanorales
- Family: Parmeliaceae
- Genus: Parmotrema
- Species: P. aberrans

Binomial name
- Parmotrema aberrans (Vain.) Canêz & Marcelli (2008)

Synonyms
- Parmelia xanthina f. aberrans Vain. (1890); Parmelia aberrans (Vain.) Abbayes (1958)

Species of lichen

Parmotrema aberrans is a species of lichen in the family Parmeliaceae. It is found in the Neotropics, from Mexico to Paraguay. The species was originally described by Edvard August Vainio in 1890 as a form of Parmelia xanthina. In 1958, Henry Nicollon des Abbayes promoted it to species level within Parmelia. Luciana Canêz and Marcelo Marcelli transferred it to Parmotrema in 2008.

Characteristics of Parmotrema aberrans include a greenish-yellow thallus (due to the presence of usnic acid), continuous cilia on the margins, cylindrical isidia with cilia, and the presence of gyrophoric acid in the medulla. Parmotrema xanthinum is quite similar in appearance and morphology, but lacks medullary gyrophoric acid.

The lichenicolous fungus Macroskyttea parmotrematis (Helotiales), reported as a new genus and species in 2015, inhabits the thalli of Parmotrema aberrans (as well as P. ultralucens).

== See also ==
- List of Parmotrema species
