= Parmotrema aldabrense =

Scientific classification
- Kingdom: Fungi
- Division: Ascomycota
- Class: Lecanoromycetes
- Order: Lecanorales
- Family: Parmeliaceae
- Genus: Parmotrema
- Species: P. aldabrense

Binomial name
- Parmotrema aldabrense (C.W.Dodge) Hale (1974)

Synonyms
- Parmelia aldabrensis C.W.Dodge (1959)

Species of lichen

Parmotrema aldabrense is a species of lichen in the family Parmeliaceae that is found in Africa. It was first described by Carroll William Dodge in 1959 as a species of Parmelia. Mason Hale transferred it to the genus Parmotrema in 1974. The type collection was made in the Aldabra Islands, where it was found growing on tamarind. It has also been recorded from Madagascar. The lichen has an olive-buff coloured thallus measuring up to 14 cm (5.5 in) in diameter.

== See also ==
- List of Parmotrema species
