= Parmotrema marcellianum =

Scientific classification
- Domain: Eukaryota
- Kingdom: Fungi
- Division: Ascomycota
- Class: Lecanoromycetes
- Order: Lecanorales
- Family: Parmeliaceae
- Genus: Parmotrema
- Species: P. marcellianum

Binomial name
- Parmotrema marcellianum Spielmann & Bungartz (2019)

Species of lichen

Parmotrema marcellianum is a species of saxicolous (rock-dwelling), foliose lichen in the family Parmeliaceae. Found on the Galápagos Islands, it was formally described as a new species in 2019 by lichenologists Frank Bungartz and Adriano Spielmann. The type specimen was collected from Cerro Ventanas on Floreana Island at an altitude of 424 m (1,391 ft); there, it was found overgrowing pebbles on sun-, wind-, and rain-exposed ground. The species epithet honours the authors' colleague Marcelo Pinto Marcelli, "in recognition of his work on the lichen family Parmeliaceae".

== Description ==
The upper thallus surface of Parmotrema marcellianum is whitish-gray and can be shiny or dull. The surface is densely marked with a net-like pattern and is often cracked. It produces many soralia, which are capitate and stalked and grow at the tips of short to elongate lobes (called clavulae). The soredia are typically creamy white and have a granular texture. The lobes are small and narrow, ranging from 0.5 to 2.5 mm in width, and are abundantly ciliate. The cilia are black, mostly simple, and can be up to 1 mm long. The lower surface of the lichen is blackened throughout or strongly dark brown at the very edge of the lobes, with the rhizines growing all the way to the edge of the lobe. There is no distinct deep brown rhizine-free lower margin, but the lower cortex can be mottled white, especially below the clavulae. The rhizines, where present, are long, slender, and black, mostly simple, and occasionally sparsely branched. The medulla is white. No apothecia were observed among the collected specimens, but there are immersed, spherical pycnidia with brownish-black ostioles. The conidia are filiform and measure around 10 to 12 by 1 μm.

The cortex contains atranorin, while the medulla has salazinic acid. The expected results of standard chemical spot tests in the cortex are P+ (yellow),K+ (yellow), KC−, C−, UV−; and in the medulla P+ (deep yellow), K+ (yellowish turning dark red), KC−, C−, UV−.

== See also ==
- List of Parmotrema species
