= Parmotrema applanatum =

Scientific classification
- Kingdom: Fungi
- Division: Ascomycota
- Class: Lecanoromycetes
- Order: Lecanorales
- Family: Parmeliaceae
- Genus: Parmotrema
- Species: P. applanatum

Binomial name
- Parmotrema applanatum Marcelli & C.H.Ribeiro (2002)

Species of lichen

Parmotrema applanatum is a species of saxicolous (rock-dwelling) foliose lichen in the family Parmeliaceae. Originally described from collections made in Vale do Sol, Brazil, it was introduced as new to science in 2002. The lichen has a grey thallus up to 6 cm (2.4 in) wide, comprising lobes that are 0.2–0.6 mm wide. It grows on tree-shaded rocks in open woods. The species is difficult to collect because the thallus adheres strongly to its substrate. The specific epithet appalantum (Latin for "plane") refers to "the notoriously plane habit of the thalli".

== Taxonomy ==
Parmotrema applanatum was described in 2002 by Marcelo Marcelli and Célio Ribeiro during their survey of parmelioid lichens in south-eastern Brazil. It belongs to the foliose genus Parmotrema (family Parmeliaceae), whose members share a grey-green, leaf-like thallus with a black lower surface and the cortical substance atranorin. The type specimen was collected in the municipality of Serra Negra, São Paulo state, on weathered clay roof tiles of holiday chalets at "Hotel Estâncias Veraneio", near kilometre 12 of the Serra Negra–Lindóia road, on 4 April 1993. The species epithet—applanatum—refers to the remarkably flat, tightly appressed thallus that distinguishes it from related species such as P. dilatatum and P. praesorediosum.

Although standard spot tests on the internal medulla give K+ (yellow), KC+ (red) and P+ (pale yellow) reactions, thin-layer chromatography failed to detect any secondary metabolites other than cortical atranorin. This chemical profile, combined with the very narrow lobes and continuous granular soralia, supports recognition of the species as a distinct taxon within a complex of small-lobed, saxicolous Parmotrema species.

== Description ==
The thallus forms firm, exceedingly flat patches up to about 6 cm across. Its upper surface is pale grey (tan when dried) and divided into extremely slender lobes only 0.2–0.6 mm wide. These lobes overlap like roof tiles, remain tightly stuck to the substrate and end in softly rounded tips bordered by a fine black rim. The surface is slightly wrinkled but otherwise featureless: there are no maculae (pale blotches), cilia (hair-like fringe), isidia (finger-like outgrowths) or pustules. Instead, the thallus bears a neat band of continuous marginal soralia—specialised, powder-filled openings—whose coarse, sand-like soredia provide the main means of propagation.

Inside, the medulla is white. The lower surface shows a shiny black centre with fine wrinkles and veins, merging towards the edge into a chestnut-brown band devoid of attachment fibres. Elsewhere the underside carries abundant, simple rhizines (short, root-like strands) 0.2–0.8 mm long that anchor the lichen. No sexual fruit-bodies (apothecia) or flask-shaped asexual structures (pycnidia) have yet been observed in the species, suggesting dispersal relies on the soralia.

Parmotrema applanatum resembles P. hababianum, but differs from that species in lacking cilia, and containing traces of usnic acid and atranorin in its upper cortex.

== Habitat and distribution ==
Parmotrema applanatum is a rock-dweller (saxicolous) known initially only from its type area in the Serra Negra massif of São Paulo, south-eastern Brazil. It grows on siliceous rocks and man-made stonework (in this case clay roof tiles) that lie beneath the broken shade of trees in open woodland. Field notes indicate that the lichen forms locally abundant colonies on shaded rock faces yet is never found on adjacent bark, implying a clear preference for mineral substrates that remain humid but well-aerated. Its plane, sheet-like thallus adheres so firmly that specimens are difficult to remove without damage, a trait that may partly explain why the species has been overlooked in earlier surveys. In 2005, the lichen was recorded in China.

== See also ==
- List of Parmotrema species
