= Parmotrema apricum =

Scientific classification
- Kingdom: Fungi
- Division: Ascomycota
- Class: Lecanoromycetes
- Order: Lecanorales
- Family: Parmeliaceae
- Genus: Parmotrema
- Species: P. apricum

Binomial name
- Parmotrema apricum (Krog & Swinscow) Krog & Swinscow (1983)

Synonyms
- Parmelia aprica Krog & Swinscow (1981)

Species of lichen

Parmotrema apricum is a species of corticolous lichen in the family Parmeliaceae that is found in Africa. It was originally placed in the genus Parmelia by authors Hildur Krog and Dougal Swinscow in 1981. The holotype collection was made in the Machakos County, north of Kibwezi town in Kenya, where it was found growing on shrubs in a sun-exposed dry location. Two years later, the authors transferred it to the genus Parmotrema.

The leathery thallus of Parmotrema apricum is bright yellow to yellow-green, comprising lobes that are 0.5–1 cm wide. Apothecia and pycnidia are not known for this species.

== See also ==
- List of Parmotrema species
