= Parmotrema alectoronicum =

Scientific classification
- Domain: Eukaryota
- Kingdom: Fungi
- Division: Ascomycota
- Class: Lecanoromycetes
- Order: Lecanorales
- Family: Parmeliaceae
- Genus: Parmotrema
- Species: P. alectoronicum

Binomial name
- Parmotrema alectoronicum C.H.Ribeiro & Marcelli (2002)

Species of saxicolous lichen

Parmotrema alectoronicum is a species of saxicolous lichen in the family Parmeliaceae that was introduced as new to science in 2002. It was originally described from collections made in Serra do Caraça, Brazil, where it was found growing at an elevation of 1,220 m (4,000 ft). The lichen has a yellowish-green thallus up to 9 cm (3.5 in) wide, comprising lobes that are 2.0–4.0 mm wide. The margins of the lobes have cilia that are up to 1.5 mm long. The specific epithet alectoronicum refers to the presence of alectoronic acid in the medulla. This presence of this compound, as well as usnic acid in its cortex, is a rare combination in the genus Parmotrema.

== See also ==
- List of Parmotrema species
