= Parmotrema araucariarum =

Scientific classification
- Domain: Eukaryota
- Kingdom: Fungi
- Division: Ascomycota
- Class: Lecanoromycetes
- Order: Lecanorales
- Family: Parmeliaceae
- Genus: Parmotrema
- Species: P. araucariarum

Binomial name
- Parmotrema araucariarum (Zahlbr.) Hale (1974)

Synonyms
- Parmelia araucariarum Zahlbr. (1909)

Species of lichen

Parmotrema araucariarum is a species of lichen in the family Parmeliaceae. It was first described scientifically as a species of Parmelia by Austrian botanist Alexander Zahlbruckner in 1909. Mason Hale transferred it to the genus Parmotrema in 1974. The lichen has been reported from Kenya, Tanzania, and South America.

== See also ==
- List of Parmotrema species
