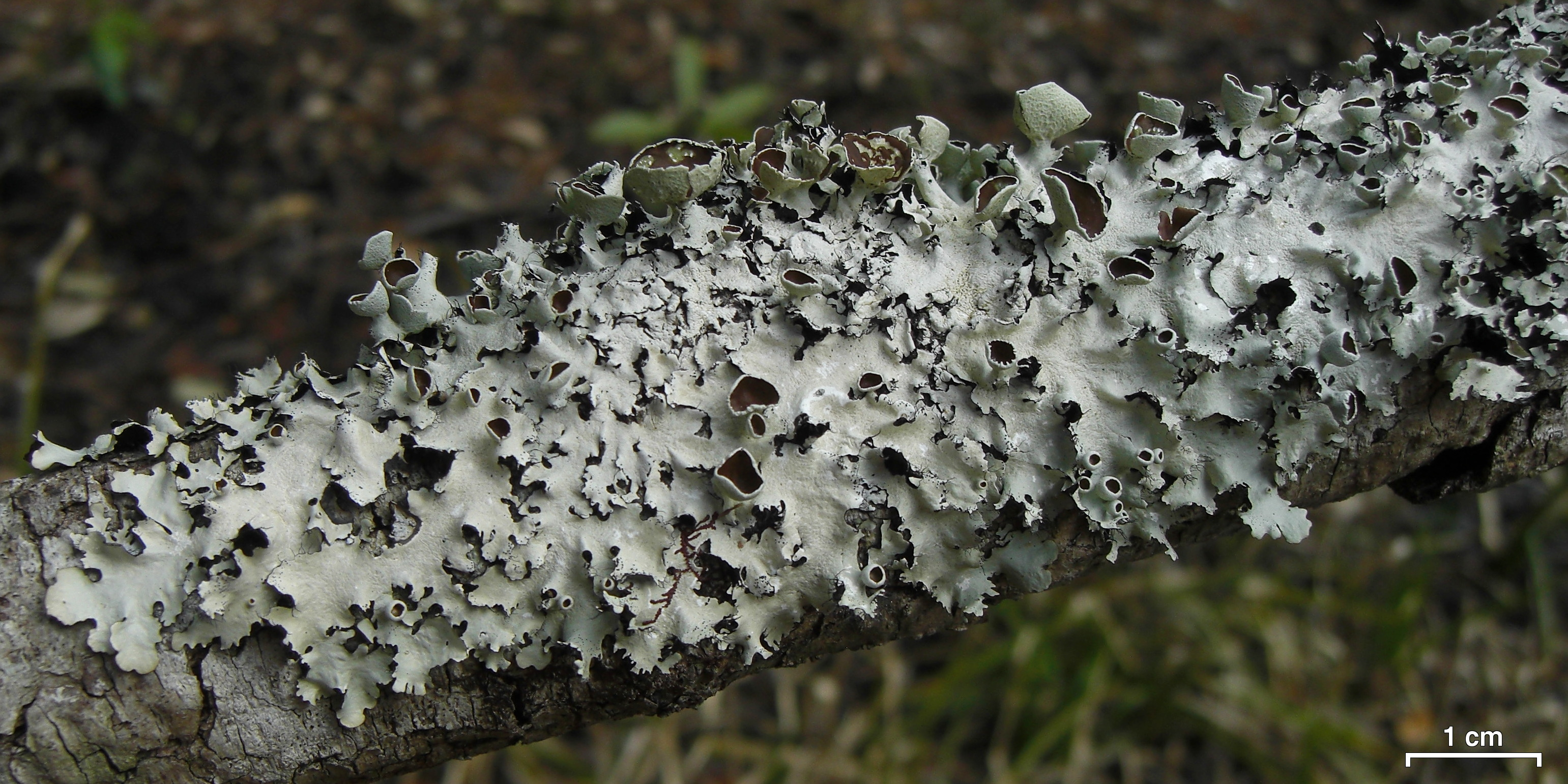

Conservation status
- Secure (NatureServe)

Scientific classification
- Kingdom: Fungi
- Division: Ascomycota
- Class: Lecanoromycetes
- Order: Lecanorales
- Family: Parmeliaceae
- Genus: Parmotrema
- Species: P. submarginale

Binomial name
- Parmotrema submarginale (Michx.) DePriest & B.W.Hale (1998)

Synonyms
- Lobaria submarginale Michx. [as 'submarginalis'] (1803)

= Parmotrema submarginale =

Species of lichen

Parmotrema submarginale is a species of corticolous (bark-dwelling), foliose lichen in the family Parmeliaceae. It was first formally described as a new species in 1803 by French botanist André Michaux, who called it Lobaria submarginalis. Paula DePriest and Beatrice Hale transferred it to the genus Parmotrema in 1998. It is found in Bolivia, Brazil, Costa Rica, Thailand, and the United States.

Paragyalideopsis floridae is a lichenicolous fungus that has been documented infecting Parmotrema submarginale in Florida.

== See also ==
- List of Parmotrema species
