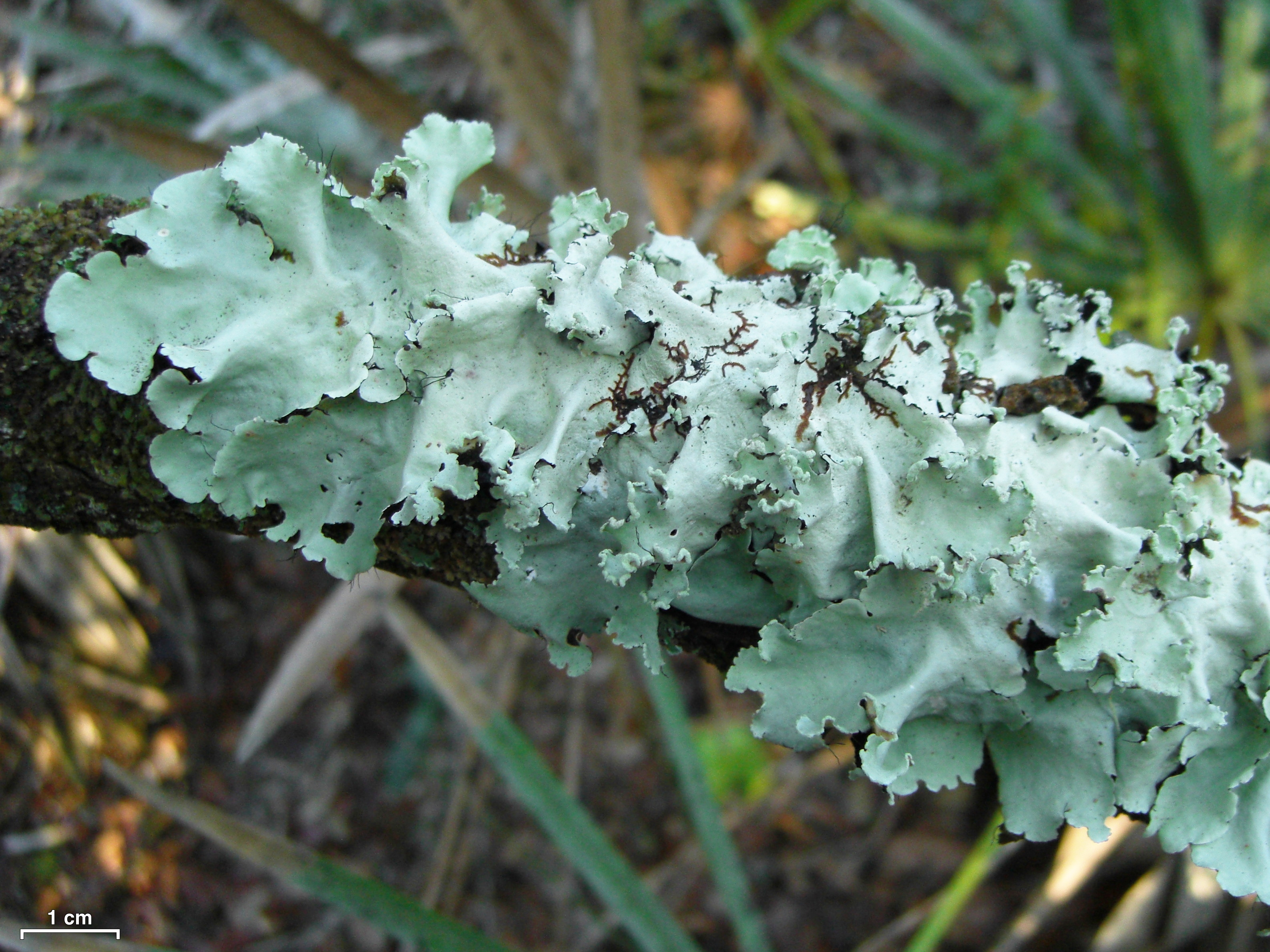

Conservation status
- Secure (NatureServe)

Scientific classification
- Kingdom: Fungi
- Division: Ascomycota
- Class: Lecanoromycetes
- Order: Lecanorales
- Family: Parmeliaceae
- Genus: Parmotrema
- Species: P. rampoddense

Binomial name
- Parmotrema rampoddense (Nyl.) Hale (1974)

Synonyms
- Parmelia rampoddensis Nyl. (1900); Diploschistes rampoddensis (Nyl.) Zahlbr. (1924)

= Parmotrema rampoddense =

Species of lichen-forming fungus

Parmotrema rampoddense, commonly known as the long-whiskered ruffle lichen, is a species of foliose lichen in the family Parmeliaceae. It is widely distributed in tropical regions and grows on the bark of oak and palm trees.

== Taxonomy ==
It was originally described by William Nylander as a species of Parmelia, from a collection made in Sri Lanka. Mason Hale transferred the taxon to the genus Parmotrema in 1974.

== Description ==
The colour of the lichen thallus is light greenish-grey, and lacks maculae (paler spots free of photobiont). The lobes comprising the thallus surface are 1–3 cm wide and have scattered cilia on the margin, which can be relatively long – up to 5 mm. The lower surface (the prothallus) is black, rarely with white blotches, and relatively free of rhizines.

The cortex contains atranorin, while the medulla contains alectoronic acid.

== Habitat and distribution ==
In Nepal, Parmotrema rampoddense has been reported from 900 to 2,800 m elevation in a compilation of published records.

== See also ==
- List of Parmotrema species
