= Parmotrema alidactylatum =

Scientific classification
- Domain: Eukaryota
- Kingdom: Fungi
- Division: Ascomycota
- Class: Lecanoromycetes
- Order: Lecanorales
- Family: Parmeliaceae
- Genus: Parmotrema
- Species: P. alidactylatum

Binomial name
- Parmotrema alidactylatum Estrabou & Adler (1998)

Species of lichen

Parmotrema alidactylatum is a species of saxicolous lichen in the family Parmeliaceae. Found in Argentina, it was described as new to science in 1998. The holotype was collected in Cerro Colorado in northern Córdoba Province, where it was found growing on granite. The thallus of the lichen is foliose, with a grey colour, and measures up to 10 cm (4 in) across. The specific epithet alidactylatum refers to the presence of aliphatic acids in the medulla and the dactylate (referring to finger-like processes) upper surface. Parmotrema alidactylatum is similar in appearance and morphology to P. tsavoënse, but has different medullary chemistry.

== See also ==
- List of Parmotrema species
