= Parmotrema austrocetratum =

Scientific classification
- Kingdom: Fungi
- Division: Ascomycota
- Class: Lecanoromycetes
- Order: Lecanorales
- Family: Parmeliaceae
- Genus: Parmotrema
- Species: P. austrocetratum

Binomial name
- Parmotrema austrocetratum Elix & J.Johnst. (1988)

Species of lichen

Parmotrema austrocetratum is a species of lichen in the family Parmeliaceae. Found in Australia and New Zealand, it was described as new to science in 1988 by John Elix and Jen Johnston. The lichen, which can grow on either bark or rock, is light grey in colour, measures 6–12 cm (2.4–4.7 in) in diameter, and is loosely attached to its substrate. It is common on trees and rocks in coastal and hinterland areas along the subtropical and tropical east coast of Australia, as well as the North Island of New Zealand.

== See also ==
- List of Parmotrema species
