= Idisia =

Scientific classification
- Domain: Eukaryota
- Kingdom: Animalia
- Phylum: Arthropoda
- Class: Insecta
- Order: Coleoptera
- Suborder: Polyphaga
- Infraorder: Cucujiformia
- Family: Tenebrionidae
- Subfamily: Pimeliinae
- Tribe: Idisiini
- Genus: Idisia; Pascoe, 1866
- Species: I. ornata

Binomial name
- Idisia ornata Pascoe, 1866

Genus of beetles

Idisia is a genus of darkling beetles in the family Tenebrionidae. Idisia has at least one described species, I. ornata, found in the Palearctic.
