= Pyxine consocians =

Scientific classification
- Kingdom: Fungi
- Division: Ascomycota
- Class: Lecanoromycetes
- Order: Caliciales
- Family: Caliciaceae
- Genus: Pyxine
- Species: P. consocians

Binomial name
- Pyxine consocians Vain. (1913)

Synonyms
- Pyxine meissneri var. physciiformis Malme (1897); Pyxine physciiformis (Malme) Imshaug (1957)

Species of lichen-forming fungus

Pyxine consocians is a species of foliose lichen in the family Caliciaceae. It was first described from the Philippines, growing on tree bark, and has since been found widely across Asia and the Pacific, including India, South Korea, Sri Lanka, Thailand, and the Gilbert Islands. The lichen forms a thin, leaf-like thallus with a bluish-grey upper surface and produces small black fruiting bodies. Chemical studies have identified several compounds in the lichen, including atranorin, zeorin, and lichexanthone.

== Taxonomy ==
Pyxine consocians was first described by the Finnish lichenologist Edvard August Vainio in 1913. Vainio considered it closest to Pyxine glaucescens, differing by its more granular thallus and by the reaction of the hypothecium; in these characters it agrees with Pyxine retirugella, which in turn differs from P. consocians in the colour and chemical reaction of the thallus.

== Description ==
Pyxine consocians is a foliose lichen. The thallus (lichen body) is fairly thin, bluish-grey above and epruinose (without pruina), somewhat opaque, and lacks soredia and isidia. Its surface is faintly net-like and wrinkled, and the medulla (the inner layer) is white. In basic chemical tests, the upper surface gives no reaction (K−), while the inner medulla reacts K+ (yellow → red). The lobes are irregular, 0.5–1 mm wide, closely adjoining or merging together, flat, and have slightly roughened or grainy margins. The underside is dark and bears short, black, inconspicuous rhizines that attach it to the substrate.

The apothecia (disc-like fruiting bodies) are 0.5–1.6 mm across and lecideine in form, with a blackish to ashy-black rim. The disc is flat, black, and uncoated, and the inner excipulum is pale whitish. The hypothecium is whitish below, brownish above, and K−, while the epithecium is greenish to sooty and K+ (violet). Ascospores, which number eight per ascus, are arranged in two rows, brownish, fusiform to oblong with rounded ends, and divided by a single septum. Their walls are unevenly thickened (more so at the ends and the septum), and they measure about 20 μm × 6 μm. Korean specimens showed more crowded, irregularly branched lobes with blunt tips, a greyish-yellow upper surface, and a black lower surface bearing coarse rhizines tipped with pale ends.

Pyxine consocians has been reported to contain several secondary metabolites: atranorin, methyl-β-orcinolcarboxylate, zeorin, 4-O-methylcryptochlorophaeic acid, lichexanthone, and cabraleadiol monoacetate, a triterpenoid compound. More recent studies have also detected norstictic acid (as a minor compound), and noted that the thallus reacts K+ (yellow) and the medulla K+ (dirty red), C+, and P+ (pale red).

== Habitat and distribution ==
The type material of Pyxine consocians is from Comiran (Philippines), collected by Elmer Drew Merrill (specimen 7167 p.p.), on the bark of a broad-leaved tree, collected together with P. glaucescens. It has since been documented throughout Asia: from Uttar Pradesh (India), South Korea, Sri Lanka, and Thailand. It also occurs on the Onotoa atoll in the Gilbert Islands, and in the Maldives archipelago.
