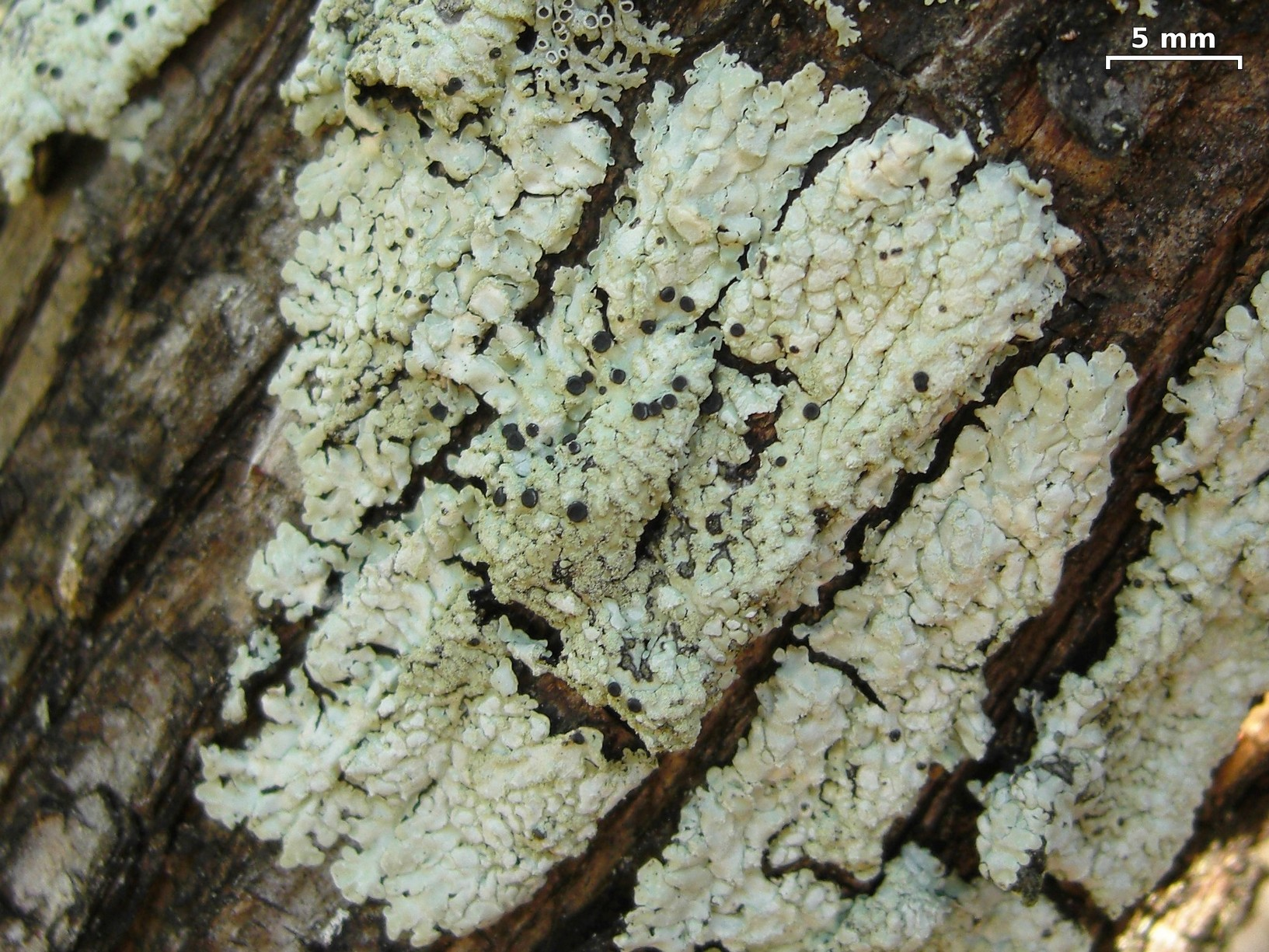

Scientific classification
- Domain: Eukaryota
- Kingdom: Fungi
- Division: Ascomycota
- Class: Lecanoromycetes
- Order: Caliciales
- Family: Caliciaceae
- Genus: Pyxine
- Species: P. cocoes

Binomial name
- Pyxine cocoes (Sw.) Nyl. (1857)

Synonyms
- Lichen cocoës Sw. (1788); Lobaria cocoës (Sw.) Raeusch. (1797); Lecidea cocoës (Sw.) Ach. (1803); Circinaria cocoes (Sw.) Fée (1825); Coccocarpia pellita var. cocoës (Sw.) Zahlbr. (1925)

= Pyxine cocoes =

Species of lichen

Pyxine cocoes, the buttoned rosette lichen, is a widely distributed species of foliose lichen in the family Caliciaceae.

== Taxonomy ==
It was first described as a new species by Swedish botanist Olof Swartz in 1788. He called it Lichen cocoës, following the lead of Carl Linnaeus who, in his influential 1753 work Species Plantarum, placed all lichens in the eponymous genus Lichen. Finnish lichenologist William Nylander transferred it to the genus Pyxine in 1853. A common name used in North America is the "buttoned rosette lichen".

== Description ==
Pyxine cocoes has a pale grayish-green thallus comprising radiating lobes that are typically less than 1 mm wide. These lobes are closely attached to the surface of the substrate, have granular soredia that protrude through the cortex in irregularly shaped regions called soralia. The medulla is white, while the apothecia are black with black margins in mature specimens. They are 1–5 mm wide, flat, and disc-shaped. The tissue making up the base of the apothecia is brownish red. Ascospores measure 15–22 by 6–8 μm. The lichen contains lichexanthone, a xanthone compound that is found in about 20 Pyxine species.

== Habitat and distribution ==
Pyxine cocoes grows on bark and rocks. The lichen has been reported from Asia (Japan and the Philippines), East Africa, North America, Central America, and South America, Hawaii, and Australia. In Australia, it is present only in coastal locations that are seasonally humid, and both wet and warm. In this continent, it is common on tree trunks growing on coral cays; these trunks are often used as bird perches, which accumulate bird droppings. The lichenologist Roderick W. Rogers suggests that the lichen could be nitrophilic, which would explain this growth habitat, as well as its tendency to prefer habitats that are at least partially urbanized. In North America, it distribution extends as far north to Florida in the United States.

The African species Pyxine katendei is somewhat similar in appearance to Pyxine cocoes, but it has only laminal (not marginal) soralia.

== Biomonitoring studies ==
Studies conducted in India suggest that Pyxine cocoes is a candidate for biomonitoring of local air pollution. It bioaccumulates toxic heavy metals that it acquires from the air and retains the pollutants in the thallus, which can then be sampled and assayed to determine their concentration.

== Human uses ==
Pyxine cocoes is used in Papua New Guinea as a component of a traditional medicine-based remedy for inflammatory conditions. In a chemical analysis of the lichen, the triterpene compound 6,22-hopanediol was identified. This compound, commonly known as zeorin, is a hopanoid with potent inhibitory activity against the enzyme protein tyrosine phosphatase.
