= Pyxine copelandii =

Scientific classification
- Kingdom: Fungi
- Division: Ascomycota
- Class: Lecanoromycetes
- Order: Caliciales
- Family: Caliciaceae
- Genus: Pyxine
- Species: P. copelandii

Binomial name
- Pyxine copelandii Vain. (1913)

Species of lichen-forming fungus

Pyxine copelandii is a species of lichen in the family Caliciaceae. It was first discovered on the island of Panay in the Philippines, growing on the bark of broad-leaved trees, and is named in honour of American botanist Edwin Copeland. The lichen forms a thin, leaf-like body with a pale bluish-grey upper surface that is usually shiny and bears scattered, powdery reproductive structures called soredia. Since its original description, it has been documented across a wide geographic range, including Australia, Madagascar, Thailand, Fiji, the Seychelles, and several Pacific island groups.

== Taxonomy ==
Pyxine copelandii was first described by the Finnish lichenologist Edvard August Vainio in 1913. The species epithet honours Edwin Copeland, an American botanist and pteridologist who collected extensively in the Philippines. Vainio compared this taxon with several others in the genus: it resembles P. sorediata in overall thallus aspect but differs in chemistry; it also contrasts with P. chrysanthoides and P. asiatica in thallus texture and spot test reactions.

In 1986, Roderick Rogers proposed to synonymise Pyxine copelandii with Pyxine retirugella, but this suggestion has not been subsequently adopted by nomenclatural authorities.

== Description ==
Pyxine copelandii is a foliose lichen with a thin, glaucous to pale- or whitish-glaucous thallus that is usually shiny. The thallus bears rounded, thinly farinose (powdery and flour-like) soredia that are usually scattered across the thallus surface. With potassium hydroxide solution (the K test), the upper surface turns slightly yellow; the medulla turns slightly yellow then red (K+ yellow → red). Lobes are 0.3–0.7 mm wide, irregular, often radiating and contiguous, and are plane and smooth. The underside is darkened, and the rhizines are very short and blackish. Apothecia were not observed in the original material.

Vainio noted that specimens can resemble P. sorediata, which shows pruina towards the thallus margin and has a medulla that is white to faintly yellow and K− or only faintly coloured; in contrast, P. copelandii has a K+ medulla (yellow → red). It differs from P. chrysanthoides, which has a K− thallus and a yellow medulla. It also differs from P. asiatica, which has a rugulose (wrinkled) thallus and a different medullary K-reaction; P. copelandii is smooth.

== Habitat and distribution ==
Vainio described the species from the island of Panay, Philippines, based on material collected in Capiz. The type is specimen "Copeland 38 p.p.", gathered on the bark of broad-leaved trees. Pyxine copelandii is one of 14 Pyxine species that have been recorded from the Philippines, and one of nine in the genus that was first described from specimens collected in the country. It has also been recorded from Australia, Papua New Guinea, Fiji, Madagascar, Thailand, the Onotoa atoll in the Gilbert Islands, and the Seychelles.
