= Pyxine lilacina =

Scientific classification
- Domain: Eukaryota
- Kingdom: Fungi
- Division: Ascomycota
- Class: Lecanoromycetes
- Order: Caliciales
- Family: Caliciaceae
- Genus: Pyxine
- Species: P. lilacina

Binomial name
- Pyxine lilacina Swinscow & Krog (1975)

Species of lichen

Pyxine lilacina is a rare species of saxicolous (rock-dwelling), foliose lichen in the family Caliciaceae. Found in East Africa, it was scientifically described as a new species in 1975 by lichenologists Dougal Swinscow and Hildur Krog. The lichen has a brownish-grey to lilac-grey thallus that is tightly appressed to its substrate. The lobes comprising the thallus are flat, and have pseudocyphellae (tiny pores for air exchange) as well as patches of pruina. The thallus underside is black; the internal medulla is white. The lichen contains triterpenoid compounds as well as lichexanthone; the latter substance causes the lichen to fluoresce when lit with a long-wavelength UV light.

Pyxine lilacina is only known to occur in Uganda and Kenya, where it grows on fully or partially exposed rocks, at elevations ranging between 1,100 to 1,700 m (3,600 to 5,600 ft).
