= Pyxine lyei =

Scientific classification
- Domain: Eukaryota
- Kingdom: Fungi
- Division: Ascomycota
- Class: Lecanoromycetes
- Order: Caliciales
- Family: Caliciaceae
- Genus: Pyxine
- Species: P. lyei

Binomial name
- Pyxine lyei Swinscow & Krog (1975)

Species of lichen

Pyxine lyei is a species of saxicolous (rock-dwelling), foliose lichen in the family Caliciaceae. Found in East Africa, it was scientifically described as a new species in 1975 by lichenologists Dougal Swinscow and Hildur Krog. The lichen has a whitish thallus that is tightly appressed to its substrate. The lobes comprising the thallus are flat, and have faint pseudocyphellae (tiny pores for air exchange) as well as patches of pruina. The thallus underside is black; the internal medulla is white. The lichen contains triterpenoid compounds as well as lichexanthone; the latter substance causes the lichen to fluoresce when lit with a long-wavelength UV light.

Pyxine lyei is only known to occur in Uganda and Kenya, where it is locally common on fully exposed rocks in hot and dry places, typically at elevations ranging between 1,200 to 1,900 m (3,900 to 6,200 ft).
