= Umbilicaria africana =

Scientific classification
- Kingdom: Fungi
- Division: Ascomycota
- Class: Lecanoromycetes
- Order: Umbilicariales
- Family: Umbilicariaceae
- Genus: Umbilicaria
- Species: U. africana

Binomial name
- Umbilicaria africana (Jatta) Krog & Swinscow (1986)

Synonyms
- Gyrophora haplocarpa var. africana Jatta (1908); Gyrophora caplocarpa var. africana Jatta (1908); Omphalodiscus africanus (Jatta) Llano (1950)

Species of lichen-forming fungus

Umbilicaria africana is a species of foliose lichen in the family Umbilicariaceae. Initially described as a variety under Gyrophora haplocarpa by Antonio Jatta in 1908, it was elevated to species status in 1986. This lichen is predominantly found on boulders of siliceous rock in the high alpine zones of the tropical mountains of South America and parts of Africa.

== Taxonomy ==
Umbilicaria africana was originally catalogued as Gyrophora haplocarpa var. africana by Antonio Jatta in 1908; it was recognised as a distinct species by Hildur Krog and T.D.V. Swinscow in 1986. The type specimen was collected in Uganda's Rwenzori Mountains. It is a member of the U. aprina species group, a set of closely related species that includes U. africana, U. antarctica, U. aprina, U. formosana, U. kappeni, and U. rhizinata.

== Description ==
The thallus of Umbilicaria africana is single-leaved (monophyllous) and shield-like (peltate), reaching up to 6 cm (2.4 in) in diameter. It often features deeply divided, irregularly incised lobes that curl when dry and may include perforations. The upper surface varies from grey to brownish-grey, is smooth to rough (scabrous), and covered with a thin, dead (necral) layer. It displays a moderate network of ridges around the central attachment point (umbo) and has sparser, worm-like (vermiform) ridges or is smooth towards the edges. The surface typically hosts clusters of thin, black, branched, and intertwined root-like structures (rhizinomorphs). The underside is smooth, pale around the central attachment, and darkens to grey or black, dotted with patches of multi-cellular reproductive particles (thalloconidia) and scattered clusters of moderately branched rhizinomorphs.

Reproductive features include black fruiting bodies (apothecia) which are rare in specimens from the Andes. The thalloconidia are dark brown to black, spherical to ellipsoid, and typically 4 to 10-celled, although simpler forms occur.

=== Similar species ===
Umbilicaria africana has been confused with the somewhat similar U. aprina, but can be distinguished by its typically multi-cellular thalloconidia, deeply incised lobes, and patchy distribution of rhizinomorphs. Molecular studies suggest a close relationship between these two species, although U. aprina has a broader geographical distribution.

== Habitat and distribution ==
Umbilicaria africana is most commonly found at elevations ranging from 4,400 to 5,000 m (14,400 to 16,400 ft) in the tropical high mountains of South America, including Bolivia and Peru, and is also present in some high-elevation regions of Africa, such as Ethiopia, Kenya, Tanzania, and Uganda. It occurs in cold, high-elevation environments, growing on non-calcareous rocks.
