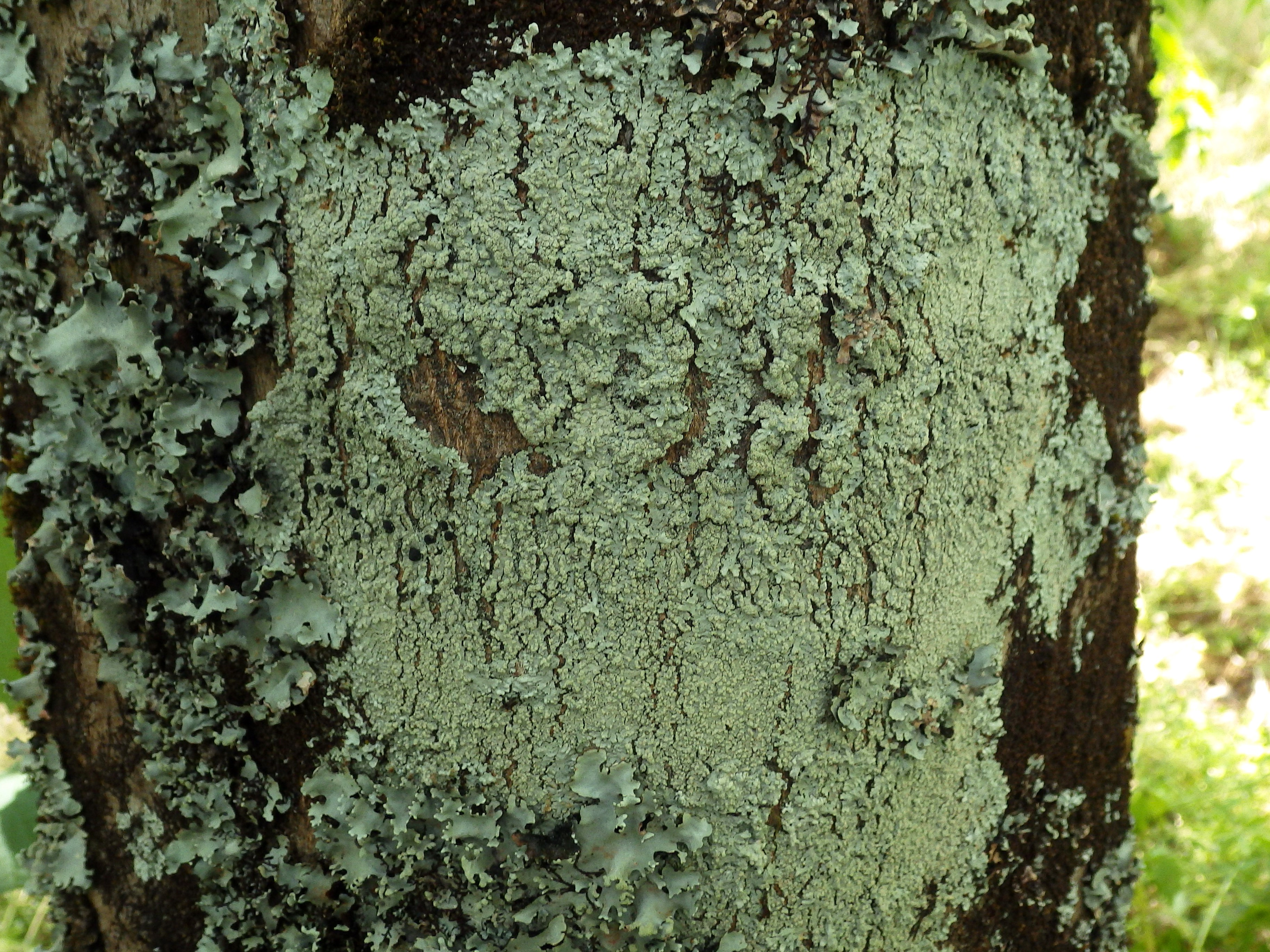

Conservation status
- Apparently Secure (NatureServe)

Scientific classification
- Kingdom: Fungi
- Division: Ascomycota
- Class: Lecanoromycetes
- Order: Caliciales
- Family: Caliciaceae
- Genus: Pyxine
- Species: P. subcinerea

Binomial name
- Pyxine subcinerea Stirt. (1898)

Synonyms
- Pyxine cocoes var. caesiopruinosa Tuck. (1869); Pyxine meissneri var. sorediosa Müll.Arg. (1879); Physcia melanenta C.Knight (1882); Pyxine sorediata f. caesiopruinosa (Tuck.) Hue (1900); Pyxine chrysanthoides Vain. (1915); Pyxine caesiopruinosa (Tuck.) Imshaug (1957)

= Pyxine subcinerea =

Species of lichen

Pyxine subcinerea is a species of foliose lichen in the family Caliciaceae. It has a pantropical distribution, and typically grows on bark, but less commonly on rocks. The lichen is characterised by its yellow medulla, soralia on the margins on the lobes that make up the thallus, and the presence of the chemical lichexanthone in the cortex.

== Taxonomy ==
The lichen was first formally described by the Scottish scientist James Stirton from specimens collected in Queensland, Australia. He noted that its thallus was similar to that of Pyxine sorediata, but Stirton distinguished it from that species by the "internal organization of both the thallus and the apothecia", as well as the negative K reaction of the thallus, compared to the yellow reaction of P. sorediata.

Synonyms of Pyxine subcinerea include: Physcia melanenta, described by Charles Knight in 1882; Pyxine chrysanthoides, described by Edvard August Vainio in 1915 from material collected in the Antilles; Pyxine meissneri var. sorediosa, described by Johannes Müller Argoviensis in 1879; and Pyxine cocoes var. caesiopruinosa, described by Edward Tuckerman in 1869 (and later promoted to distinct species status as Pyxine caesiopruinosa by Henry Andrew Imshaug in 1957).

== Description ==
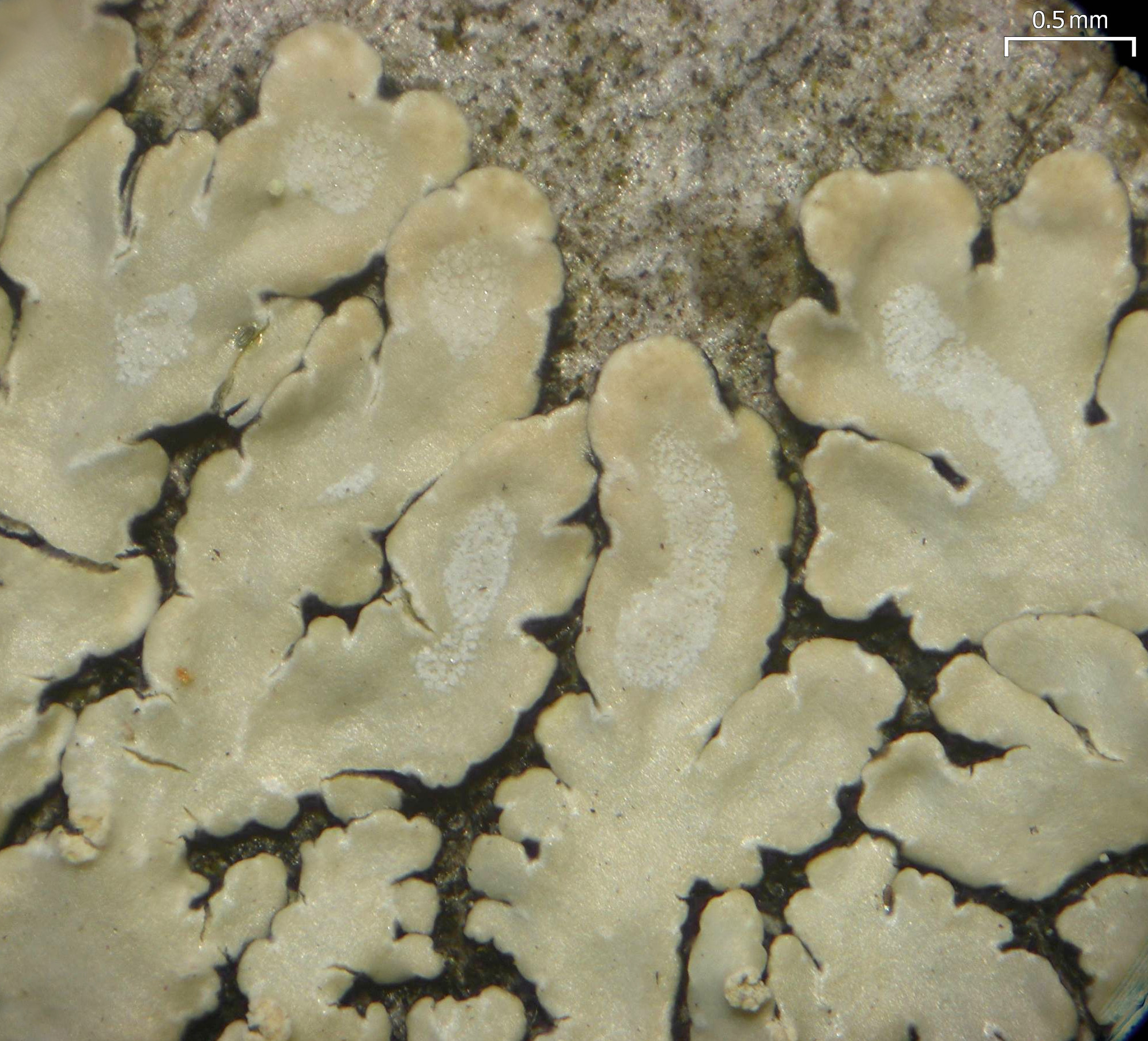
Closeup of lobes; the scale bar is 0.5 mm.

The thallus of Pyxine subcinerea is 3–8 cm (1.2–3.1 in) wide, with an upper surface ranging in colour from yellowish grey to grey to brownish grey or olive-grey. The lobes that comprise the thallus are 0.3–1.5 mm (0.01–0.06 in) wide, somewhat tightly apressed to the substrate and are more or less flat but often somewhat concave near the tips. The lobe surface are pruinose, with the pruina resembling dense points near the lobe tips. These pruina contain weddellite, a mineral form of calcium oxalate. There are distinct pseudocyphellae at the margins of the lobes. The soralia are near the lobe margins. The medulla is quite thin and yellow above. The lower surface is black in the centre, but becomes paler towards the margin. Rhizines are more or less dense, and divided into branches. The upper cortex is paraplectenchymatous (a cell arrangement where the hyphae are oriented in all directions), while the lower cortex is prosoplectenchymatous (a cell arrangement where the hyphae are all oriented in one direction). Apothecia (reproductive structures) are common in tropical and subtropical specimens; they measure 0.3–1.5 mm (0.01–0.06 in) wide and have an indistinct internal stipe. In contrast, apothecia are not typically associated with European material. Ascospores measure 13–22 by 6–9 μm. The conidia are bacilliform, and measure 3–4 μm by about 1 μm.

The secondary chemical in Pyxine subcinerea is lichexanthone. The presence of this compound results in a golden-yellow colour when illuminated with UV light. All lichen spot tests are negative.

== Habitat and distribution ==
Pyxine subcinerea has a mostly pantropical distribution. Although it is generally found growing on bark, it has also been found growing on rock, and, in one instance, on mortar. In Europe, it has been reported from the Azores and Italy. It has been reported from Africa (Ethiopia, Uganda, Kenya, Tanzania, the Seychelles, Rwanda and Angola), throughout Asia (including China), Australia, New Zealand, In the eastern United States, its geographical range covers subtropical to more temperate regions, including the states of New York, Illinois, and Ohio to Florida, Louisiana, and Texas. Pyxine subcinerea has been recorded growing on hornbeam, hickory, hibiscus, juniper, sweetgum, magnolia, oak, locust, elm, and the genus Prunus. It tends to prefer low elevations, and occurs hardwood-pine forests as well as more open areas including farms, glades, and gardens.

Pyxine subcinerea is relatively resistant to air pollution, and has been investigated for use as a candidate for biomonitoring. It bioaccumulates toxic heavy metals that it acquires from the air and retains the pollutants in the thallus, which can then be sampled and assayed to determine their concentration.
