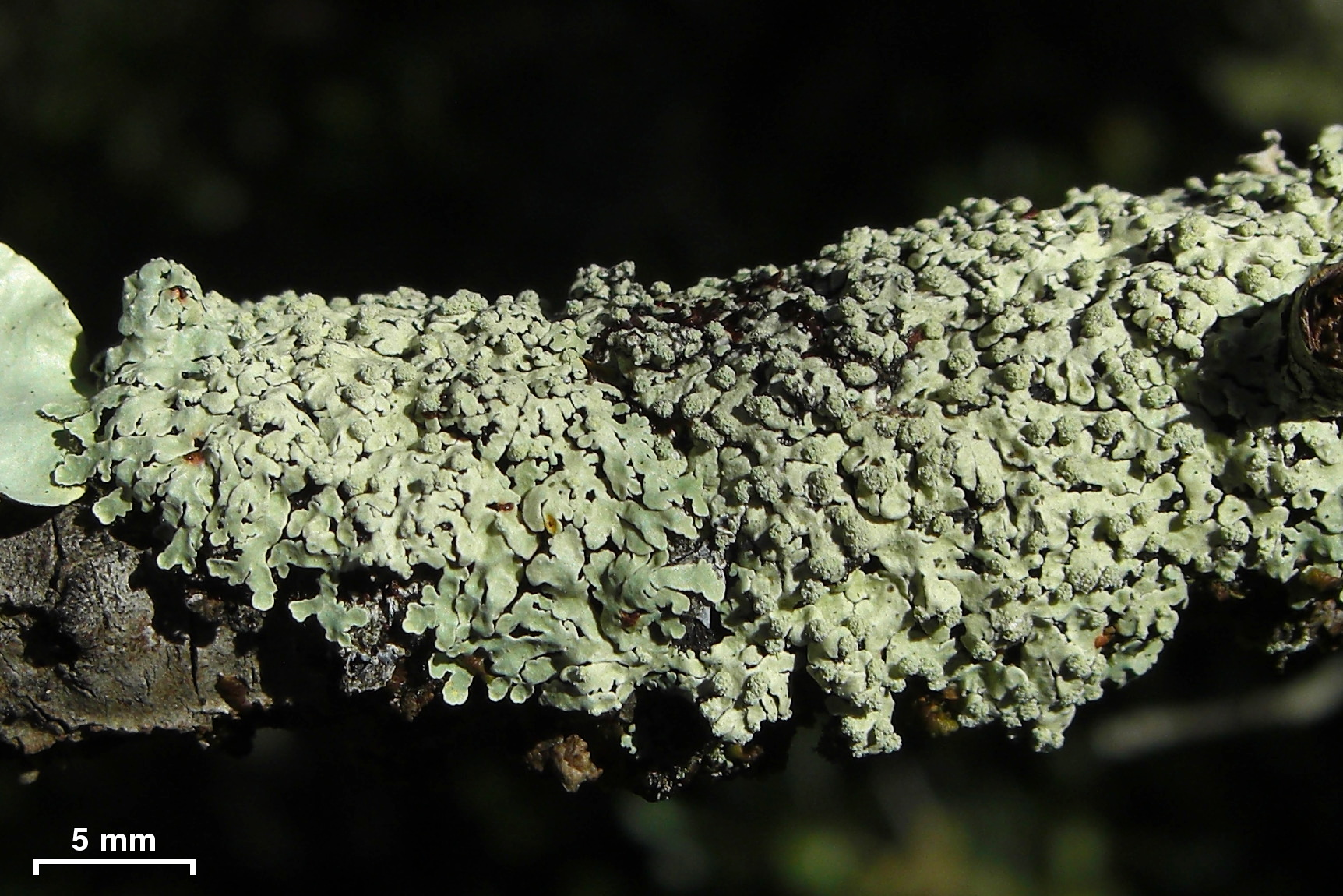

Scientific classification
- Kingdom: Fungi
- Division: Ascomycota
- Class: Lecanoromycetes
- Order: Caliciales
- Family: Caliciaceae
- Genus: Pyxine
- Species: P. albovirens

Binomial name
- Pyxine albovirens (G.Mey.) Aptroot (1987)

Synonyms
- Lecidea albovirens G.Mey. (1818)

= Pyxine albovirens =

Species of lichen

Pyxine albovirens is a species of foliose lichen in the family Caliciaceae that is found in North America and South America. It was first formally described as a species of Lecidea in 1818 by German botanist Georg Friedrich Wilhelm Meyer. André Aptroot transferred it to the genus Pyxine in 1987.

The lichen has lobes with distinctly round, laminal soralia. It contains lichexanthone, a lichen product that causes the cortex to fluoresce bright yellow when lit with a long-wavelength UV light. A chemical spot test of the medulla with an aqueous solution of potassium hydroxide (i.e., the K test) is partly K− and partly K+ (purplish).
