= Pyxine jolyana =

Scientific classification
- Kingdom: Fungi
- Division: Ascomycota
- Class: Lecanoromycetes
- Order: Caliciales
- Family: Caliciaceae
- Genus: Pyxine
- Species: P. jolyana

Binomial name
- Pyxine jolyana Jungbluth, Kalb & Marcelli (2011)
- Type locality: Jureia-Itatins Ecological Station, Brazil

Species of lichen-forming fungus

Pyxine jolyana is a species of foliose lichen in the family Caliciaceae. It is known from southeastern Brazil, where it grows on rocks and tree bark in coastal and near-coastal areas from sea level to about 915 m (3,000 ft) elevation. The species is distinguished by its brownish-gray rosettes with narrow lobes, pale yellow powdery patches near the lobe edges, and an unusual chemical combination of lichexanthone in the upper layer and norstictic acid in the interior tissue.

== Taxonomy ==
Pyxine jolyana was described as a new species in 2011 by Patrícia Jungbluth, Klaus Kalb, and Marcelo Pinto Marcelli, based on material collected in São Paulo State, Brazil. The species epithet honors Carlos Alfredo Joly for his role in supporting biodiversity work in São Paulo State.

In overall appearance it resembles some other small-lobed, gray-brown members of Pyxine, but it is set apart by its chemistry: it contains lichexanthone in the upper cortex and norstictic acid in the medulla, a combination that is uncommon in South American members of the genus. It is also distinguished by its frequent, pale yellow soralia (the powdery structures that release soredia) and by the patchy yellow-to-salmon pigmentation that develops in the upper medulla, which can vary across the thallus.

== Description ==
The thallus (lichen body) is tightly attached to its substrate and usually forms a roughly circular rosette up to about 7 cm (2.8 in) across. It is brownish gray and divided into narrow lobes (laciniae) about 0.5–1.0 mm wide, with rounded to slightly squared-off tips. The upper surface is mostly smooth and lacks isidia or other solid vegetative outgrowths, but soralia are common and tend to sit just inside the lobe margins; the soredia are powdery to slightly granular. The lower surface is black (often a bit paler toward the lobe tips) and bears many simple (unbranched) rhizines of similar color, reaching about 0.7 mm long.

Internally, the medulla is variably colored: it may be cream to pale yellow to salmon in upper parts, and sulphur-yellow beneath soralia, while a thin lower layer can remain white. In older central areas a reddish-purple pigment reaction may appear with potassium hydroxide solution (the K test). Pycnidia are rare and occur on the upper surface; the conidia are small and flask-shaped. Chemically, the cortex contains lichexanthone (giving a yellow fluorescence under ultraviolet light), while the medulla contains norstictic acid along with triterpenes and pigments; the norstictic acid can be unevenly distributed, so spot tests from the lobe tips alone may miss it.

== Habitat and distribution ==
This species was originally known from São Paulo State in southeastern Brazil, with records from coastal and near-coastal localities (including Peruíbe, Ubatuba, and São Luís do Paraitinga). It occurs from near sea level (about 1–5 m) up to at least 915 m (3,000 ft) elevation. It has since been recorded from Minas Gerais.

Pyxine jolyana grows either on rock (saxicolous) or on bark and woody surfaces (corticolous). Collections include thalli on coastal rocks, on palm stipes near a river mouth in windy, sun-exposed conditions, and on twigs and tree trunks at the edges of forest (including restinga vegetation near the ocean and shaded forest margins).
