= Pyxine katendei =

Scientific classification
- Domain: Eukaryota
- Kingdom: Fungi
- Division: Ascomycota
- Class: Lecanoromycetes
- Order: Caliciales
- Family: Caliciaceae
- Genus: Pyxine
- Species: P. katendei

Binomial name
- Pyxine katendei Swinscow & Krog (1975)

Species of lichen

Pyxine katendei is a species of corticolous (rock-dwelling), foliose lichen in the family Caliciaceae. Found in East Africa, it was scientifically described as a new species in 1975 by lichenologists Dougal Swinscow and Hildur Krog. The lichen has a whitish to pale grey thallus that is tightly appressed to its substrate. The lobes comprising the thallus are somewhat convex; they lack pseudocyphellae (tiny pores for air exchange), and have sparse pruina. The thallus underside is black; the internal medulla is white. The lichen contains triterpenoid compounds as well as lichexanthone; the latter substance causes the lichen to fluoresce when lit with a long-wavelength UV light.

Pyxine katendei is only known to occur in Ethiopia, Uganda, and Kenya, where it is common on trees and shrubs, typically in sunny locations, and at elevations ranging between 1,000 to 2,100 m (3,300 to 6,900 ft).
