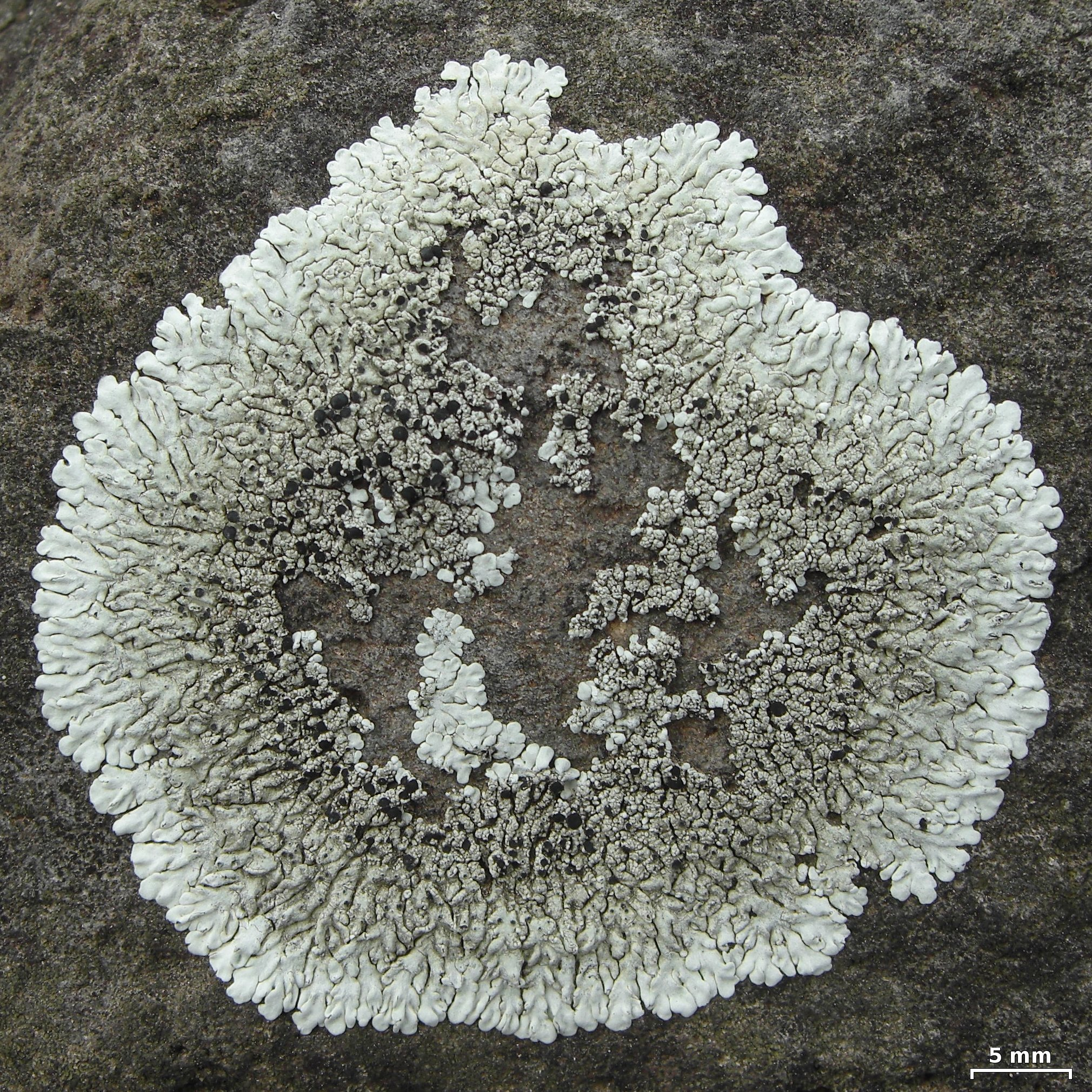

Conservation status
- Apparently Secure (NatureServe)

Scientific classification
- Kingdom: Fungi
- Division: Ascomycota
- Class: Lecanoromycetes
- Order: Caliciales
- Family: Caliciaceae
- Genus: Pyxine
- Species: P. petricola

Binomial name
- Pyxine petricola Nyl. (1876)

Synonyms
- Pyxine meissneri var. endoleuca Müll.Arg. (1879); Pyxine endoleuca (Müll.Arg.) Vain. (1898); Pyxine subvelata Stirt. (1898)

= Pyxine petricola =

Species of lichen

Pyxine petricola is a species of saxicolous (rock-dwelling), foliose lichen in the family Caliciaceae. The distribution of the lichen includes Australia, East Africa, North and Central America, and the Philippines.

== Taxonomy ==
The lichen was formally described as a new species in 1876 by the Finish lichenologist William Nylander. In Nylander's brief description, he mentions that Pyxine petricola has a slightly blue-green thallus, spreading thinly and attaching closely to surfaces. Its reproductive structures, apothecia, are black, flat, and edged, with dark, oblong, two-compartment spores. The top cell layer of the apothecium is bluish-black, contrasting with the nearly colourless layer beneath. He further notes that the species typically grows on rocks.

== Description ==
The thallus of Pyxine petricola, the lichen typically does not exceed a diameter of 40 mm (1.6 in) and features a thallus with irregular or radially arranged lobes. These lobes, measuring between 0.3 and 1.2 mm in width, are white or greyish white in colour and have a branching pattern that is somewhat dichotomous (splitting into two parts) and often overlapping (imbricate), lying flat against or slightly raised from the surface. The thallus may be smooth or slightly convex, with pseudocyphellae—specialised pores allowing gas exchange—visible as white lines along the margins and upper surface, sometimes forming a network (reticulate). Unlike some lichens, Pyxine petricola does not develop isidia (outgrowths for reproduction and dispersal) or pustules, and may or may not be covered in a fine powder (pruina). The inner tissue (medulla) of the lichen is white.

Reproductive structures (apothecia) are commonly found within the lichen, often incorporating algae within their outer rim (exciple) and featuring an internal structure (stipe) that turns red when treated with a potassium hydroxide solution (i.e., the K spot test). The ascospores measure 12–20 by 6–8 μm.

Chemically, Pyxine petricola is distinguished by the presence of lichexanthone and triterpenes. The outer layer (cortex) of the lichen fluoresces yellow under ultraviolet light but is K− and Pd−.
