= Pyxine philippina =

Scientific classification
- Kingdom: Fungi
- Division: Ascomycota
- Class: Lecanoromycetes
- Order: Caliciales
- Family: Caliciaceae
- Genus: Pyxine
- Species: P. philippina

Binomial name
- Pyxine philippina Vain. (1913)

Species of lichen-forming fungus

Pyxine philippina is a species of foliose lichen in the family Caliciaceae. It was first discovered in the Philippines, growing on tree bark in the mountainous regions of Luzon. The lichen forms a thin to moderately thick, leaf-like body with a whitish upper surface and blackish underside, anchored by short root-like structures called rhizines. Since its original description, it has been widely documented across Asia, including in Bhutan, India, Japan, Nepal, and Thailand.

== Taxonomy ==
Pyxine philippina was first described scientifically by the Finnish lichenologist Edvard August Vainio in 1913. The species epithet philippina refers to its type locality in the Philippine Islands. Vainio noted that this species is closely related to Pyxine denudatula, from which it can be distinguished by differences in the colour of the epithecium (uppermost layer of the spore-producing tissue). The species also shows some similarities to Pyxine retirugella, but differs in having a rugulose (wrinkled) rather than laciniate (deeply divided) thallus with a granular margin.

== Description ==
Pyxine philippina is a foliose lichen, meaning it has a leaf-like growth form. The thallus (the vegetative body of the lichen) is thin to moderately thick and lacks both soredia (powdery propagules) and isidia (coral-like outgrowths). The upper surface is whitish, fairly opaque, and epruinosus (without a pruinose or frosted covering), appearing smooth. The medulla (inner layer) is white. When tested with potassium hydroxide solution (the K test), the upper surface turns lutescent (yellowish), followed by rubescent (reddish). The lobes (divisions of the thallus) measure 0.5–1.4 mm in width and are irregular in shape, somewhat contiguous (nearly touching), and confluent (flowing together), often very confluent. They are flat or partially convex, appearing blackish beneath. The rhizines (root-like attachment structures) are short and blackish in colour.

The apothecia (disc-shaped fruiting bodies that produce spores) measure 1–4 mm in width and are lecideine in form (lacking a distinct thalline margin formed by thallus tissue). The margin is blackish or occasionally ashy-blackish in colour, fairly slender or of moderate thickness, whilst the disc is flat, black, and nude (bare in texture). The excipulum (outer rim of the apothecium) has an interior that is verdigris to sooty coloured and reacts strongly to potassium hydroxide, or occasionally appears whitish to ashy.

The hypothecium is distinctly brownish above and shows no reaction to potassium hydroxide, whilst appearing whitish below or occasionally becoming ashy. The spores, which number eight per ascus, are arranged in two rows, appearing brownish, oblong, and blunt to polarilocular (with polar thickenings separated by a thick septum containing a connecting channel). The spores are divided by a single cross-wall (1-septate) with membranes that are unequally thickened, particularly in the apices and at the septum, measuring 15–23 micrometres (μm) in length and 6–8 μm in width.

== Habitat and distribution ==
Pyxine philippina was originally described from specimens collected at two locations in the Philippines. The type material includes collections from Luzon (Subprovince Bontoc, Vanoverbergh 780) and from Subprovince Benguet (Merrill 7934), both growing on tree bark. Pyxine philippina is one of 14 Pyxine species that have been recorded from the Philippines, and one of nine in the genus that was first described from specimens collected in the country. The lichen has since been widely documented across Asia, including Bhutan, India, Japan, Nepal, and Thailand.
