= Pyxine profallax =

Scientific classification
- Domain: Eukaryota
- Kingdom: Fungi
- Division: Ascomycota
- Class: Lecanoromycetes
- Order: Caliciales
- Family: Caliciaceae
- Genus: Pyxine
- Species: P. profallax

Binomial name
- Pyxine profallax Kalb (2009)

Species of lichen

Pyxine profallax is a species of corticolous (bark-dwelling), foliose lichen in the family Caliciaceae. It is found in Australia, Papua New Guinea, and Thailand.

== Taxonomy ==
The lichen was formally described as a new species in 2009 by Klaus Kalb. The species epithet refers to its sorediate lookalike, Pyxine fallax. The type specimen was collected in 1975 by Syo Kurokawa near Woitape (Central Province, Papua New Guinea) at an elevation of about 1,600 m (5,200 ft).

== Description ==
The loosely attached grey, whitish, or brownish-grey thallus of Pyxine profallax reaches a diameter of up to 5 cm (2 in). A mat of shiny black rhizines attach the thallus to its bark substrate. The lobes making up the thallus are up to about 1 mm wide, and divide more or less dichotomously. They have pseudocyphellae on the margins and a reticulate upper surface texture. Neither soredia nor isidia occur in this lichen, but it does have ascomata of the obscurens-type, measuring 0.5–1 mm in diameter, with black discs. The ascospores, which number eight per ascus, have a single septum and measure 16–20 by 6.5–8 μm.

Pyxine profallax contains norstictic acid as a major compound, testacein (submajor), and atranorin as a minor secondary metabolite. Thin-layer chromatography shows that it also contains the same chemical array of terpenes that are found in its namesake, P. fallax.

== Habitat and distribution ==
Originally described from Papua New Guinea, it was recorded from Thailand in 2012, and from Queensland, Australia in 2015.
