= Pyxine pustulata =

Scientific classification
- Domain: Eukaryota
- Kingdom: Fungi
- Division: Ascomycota
- Class: Lecanoromycetes
- Order: Caliciales
- Family: Caliciaceae
- Genus: Pyxine
- Species: P. pustulata

Binomial name
- Pyxine pustulata Aptroot & Jungbluth (2014)

Species of lichen

Pyxine pustulata is a species of corticolous (bark-dwelling), foliose lichen in the family Caliciaceae. Found in Botucatu, Brazil, it was formally described as a new species in 2014 by lichenologists André Aptroot and Patrícia Jungbluth. The type specimen was collected by the authors from the botanical garden on the campus of Botucatu (São Paulo) at an altitude of 850 m (2,790 ft).

== Description ==
The lichen has a pale grey, shiny thallus that is tightly attached to its bark substrate; the lower surface is black, with simple (i.e., unbranched), black rhizines that help attach the thallus to its substrate. The lobes comprising the thallus are 0.7–1.2 mm wide, with rounded tips, and are sparsely covered with white spots (maculae). Older parts of lobes develop pustules (pimple or blister-like swellings) that are about 0.1–0.3 mm wide and about 0.2–0.6 mm high; the species epithet refers to these characteristic structures. The cortex of the thallus contains lichexanthone, a lichen product that causes it to fluoresce yellow when lit with a long-wavelength UV light. Pyxine pustulata also contains terpenoid compounds and a pigment, detectable using thin-layer chromatography.
