= Pyxine glaucescens =

Scientific classification
- Kingdom: Fungi
- Division: Ascomycota
- Class: Lecanoromycetes
- Order: Caliciales
- Family: Caliciaceae
- Genus: Pyxine
- Species: P. glaucescens

Binomial name
- Pyxine glaucescens Vain. (1913)

Species of lichen-forming fungus

Pyxine glaucescens is a species of foliose lichen in the family Caliciaceae. It was first described from Comiran (Philippines), where it grows on the bark of broad-leaved trees. The lichen forms a thin, leaf-like thallus with a bluish-grey upper surface and a blackish underside anchored by short root-like structures (rhizines). Its small, round, black fruiting bodies produce brownish ascospores.

== Taxonomy ==
Pyxine glaucescens was first described by the Finnish lichenologist Edvard August Vainio in 1913. Vainio noted that it resembles Pyxine retirugella in overall habit, but differs in the colour and KOH reactions of both the thallus and the hypothecium.

== Description ==
Pyxine glaucescens is a foliose lichen. The thallus is fairly thin, glaucous on the upper surface and epruinose (lacking pruina), opaque, and without soredia or isidia. The medulla is white. In simple spot tests the upper surface is K−, while the interior turns yellowish then reddish (especially in the algal layer). Lobes are about 0.5–1 mm wide, irregular and somewhat confluent, contiguous and plane, with a slightly reticulate-wrinkled surface. The thallus underside is blackish with short blackish rhizines.

The fruiting bodies (apothecia) are 0.7–1.2 mm across, lecideine in form with a black margin; the disc is flat, black and naked. The outer excipulum is aeruginous-sooty and K+ (violet); inside it is dingy whitish. The hypothecium is whitish below and brownish above, K+ (violet), and the epithecium is aeruginous-sooty and K+ (violet). Ascospores number eight per ascus, arranged in two rows, brownish and oblong with obtuse tips, 1-septate, with an unevenly thickened wall (thicker at the apices and at the septum); they measure 17–22 μm × 5–8 μm.

== Habitat and distribution ==
Vainio based the species on material from Comiran, collected by Elmer Drew Merrill 7167 (p.p.), on the bark of a broad-leaved tree. Pyxine glaucescens is one of 14 Pyxine species that have been recorded from the Philippines, and one of 9 in the genus that were first described from specimens collected in the country.
