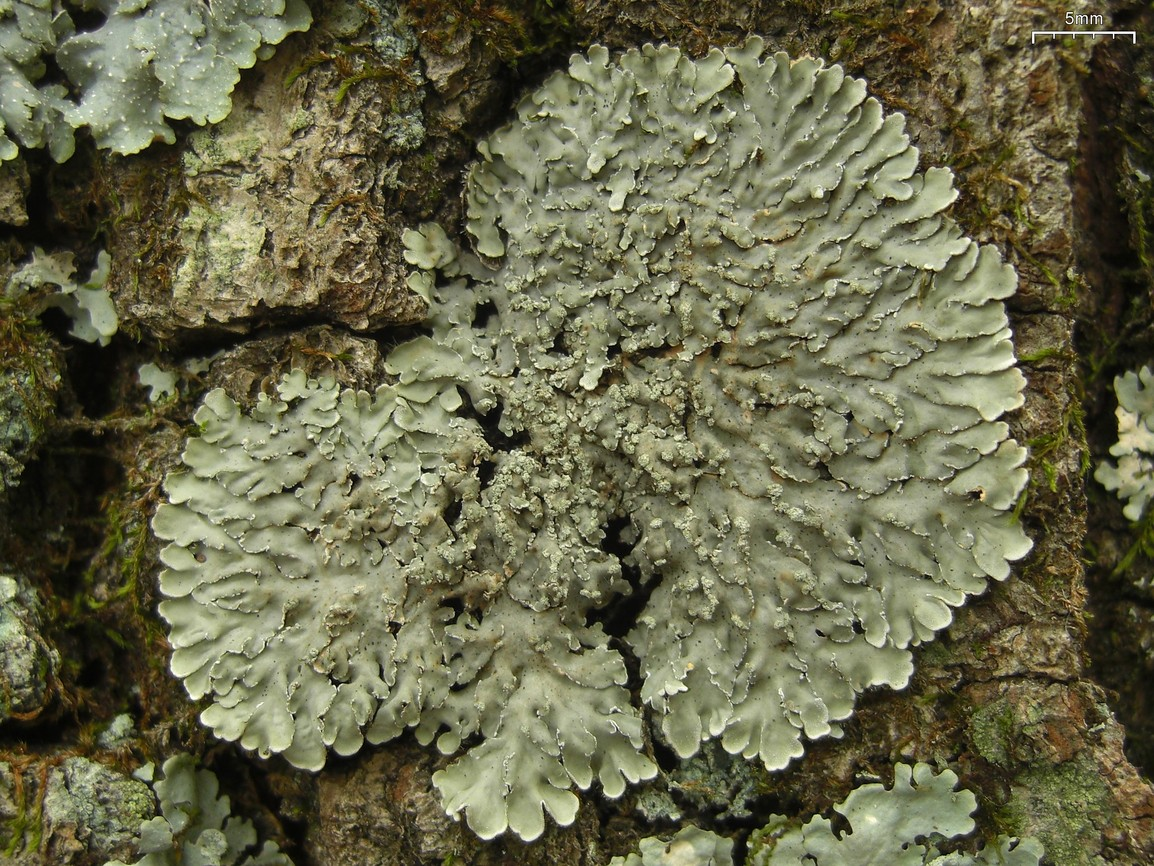

Conservation status
- Secure (NatureServe)

Scientific classification
- Kingdom: Fungi
- Division: Ascomycota
- Class: Lecanoromycetes
- Order: Caliciales
- Family: Caliciaceae
- Genus: Pyxine
- Species: P. sorediata

Binomial name
- Pyxine sorediata (Ach.) Mont. (1845)

Synonyms
- Lecidea sorediata Ach. (1814); Lichen daedaleus Sm. (1810); Parmelia sorediata (Ach.) Tuck.(1848); Placodium daedaleum (Sm.) Hook. (1833); Pyxine cocois subsp. sorediata (Ach.) Tuck. (1882); Pyxine cocois var. eschweileri Tuck. (1877)

= Pyxine sorediata =

Species of lichen

Pyxine sorediata, commonly known as mustard lichen, is a widely distributed species of foliose lichen in the family Caliciaceae. It has a subtropical to warm temperate distribution, and grows on bark, rocks, and moss as substrates. Pyxine sorediata has been reported from regions of North America, Europe, Africa, Asia, and Australasia.

== Taxonomy ==
Pyxine sorediata was first scientifically described in 1814 by Erik Acharius as Lecidea sorediata. In his brief account, Acharius mentioned the circular (orbicular) grey crust he described as wrinkled, folded, and overlapping, the spongy black underside, and the scattered apothecia. In his understanding, the lichen occurred only in North America. Elias Magnus Fries erected the genus Pyxine in 1825, assigning Lecidea sorediata as the type species, although he did not formally propose a transfer to that genus. Camille Montagne gave it its current name when he transferred it to Pyxine in 1845. A common name used in North America is "mustard lichen".

The Scottish naturalist Archibald Menzies collected a specimen from Scotland, which was later named by James Edward Smith as Lichen daedalus in 1810. Modern expert examination and chemical analysis of the specimen showed that the specimen actually belonged to Pyxine sorediata. This raised doubt as to the provenance of the specimen, as Pyxine sorediata is not found anywhere in the British Isles. The specimen posed a problem for nomenclatural reasons, as its publication preceded that of Montagne's by four years, and in the rules for botanical nomenclature, Smith's earlier name has priority. For this reason, in 2004 Jack Laundon proposed to reject the name Lichen daedaleus to safeguard the name Pyxine sorediata, and to "avoid displacing a well-established lichen name for purely nomenclatural reasons".

== Description ==
Pyxine sorediata has a foliose thallus that ranges in colour from dull bluish-grey to green-gray. The lobes comprising the thallus measure 1–2.5 mm wide, and are pruinose at the tips; they are in close contact, often overlapping. The lobe margins also have white pseudocyphellae, that contrast with the lobe; they are concentrated on the lobe margins and are rarely on the lamina. The medulla is light yellow to yellow, and this colour is sometimes present in the soralia. The underside of the thallus is black to greyish black; it has small rhizines that help attach it to its substrate. Structures called soralia are on the margins of the lobes, but sometimes form round patches on the lamina. The soredia (reproductive structures) are coarse and grainy with a dark grey colour; they tend to impart a grey colour to the central part of the thallus. Apothecia are quite rare in this species. The ascospores measure 12–17 by 6–8 μm.

Pyxine sorediata is the largest species of Pyxine. It does not have any reaction to the standard lichen spot tests. Secondary chemicals reported from the species include atranorin and unidentified triterpenes.

=== Similar species ===
Phylogenetic studies have shown that the corticolous Chinese species Pyxine hengduanensis is closely related to P. sorediata. Unlike P. sorediata, which has a yellow medulla and soralia that develop marginally from fissures and then become laminal and disc-shaped, P. hengduanensis has marginal labriform soralia that develop from the centre of the pseudocyphellae, with grey to bluish-grey soredia and a pale yellow medulla. Another lookalike is Pyxine endochrysina, but that species has isidia that range in form from granular to finger-like.

== Habitat and distribution ==
The lichen is widely distributed in northeastern North America. It grows on bark, on acidic rocks, and on moss. In Europe, where it is generally rare, Pyxine sorediata is typically collected from mossy rocks. It has been recorded in the Pyrenees, the Caucasus, in the Uholka-Shyrokyi Luh primeval beech forest in the Ukrainian Carpathians, and from the eastern coast of Lake Baikal in Siberia. Its northernmost European record is from the Bavarian-Bohemian Forest. In Australia, it occurs in areas with uniform tropical environments, subtropics, and warm temperate areas. Specimens from Queensland have been collected from elevations up to 1,000 metres (3,300 ft). Pyxine sorediata is also known from East Africa, Japan, South Korea, and China.
