= Thomas Douglas Victor Swinscow =

British lichenologist

Thomas Douglas (Dougal) Victor Swinscow
- Born: July 10, 1917; Stroud, Gloucestershire
- Died: September 24, 1992 (aged 75); Exeter, Devon
- Education: St Thomas's Hospital Medical School; University of London
- Scientific career
- Fields: Editorial team of British Medical Journal; lichenology
- Author abbrev. (botany): Swinscow

Thomas Douglas (Dougal) Victor Swinscow (1917–1992) was the founder of the British Lichen Society and the scientific journal The Lichenologist. He was also a member of the editorial team of the British Medical Journal and deputy editor from 1964 until 1977.

== Early life and education ==
Swinscow's parents were Nellie (née Alleyne) and William Sprague Swinscow. As a child Swinscow explored his home area of Devon and developed his interest in natural history. He was educated at the private boys school Kelly College, Tavistock, Devon. He completed a bachelor's degree in medicine at St Thomas's Hospital Medical School in 1939 and subsequently became a licentiate of the Royal College of Physicians, London and was registered as a member of the Royal College of Surgeons. In 1962 he was awarded an M.Sc. degree University of London for his studies on the lichen Porina.

== Career ==
After finishing his medical qualification, and working as a house surgeon at Woking Hospital he joined the Royal Army Medical Corps and was gazetted as a second lieutenant on 15 May 1941. After training in southern England and in Scotland, he was posted to Operation Torch, the invasion of North Africa. He served in Algiers as a Medical Officer from May to July 1943 with the Allied Military Government in Occupied Territories. After the surrender of the German forces, he applied to join the 1st Airborne Division and returned to England for more training, including a parachute course. He joined the 1st Airborne Reconnaissance Squadron as the medical officer in January 1944. He took part in the battle of Arnhem. After landing by parachute, he provided medical help and was later able to join the retreat and escape although he was wounded. He was recommended for the Military Cross for providing medical aid under machine gun and mortar fire but was finally awarded the Bronze Cross of the Kingdom of the Netherlands in 1945. He reached the rank of captain.

He was a member of the editorial team at the British Medical Journal between 1946 and 1981, including as Deputy Editor from 1964 until 1977. This gave him insight into the debates and politics at the start of the National Health Service. He retired in 1977 but continued his association with the journal for several years.

Swinscow was also interested in natural history, gardens and their design, and Taoism throughout his life. His interest in mystical philosophy contributed to his designs for gardens. Through contact with Ursula Duncan and Francis Rose, he developed his knowledge of bryology and lichens. However, his major interest was as an enthusiastic lichenologist. In 1957 – 1958 he decided to lead development of scientific interest in lichens, particularly through the foundation of the British Lichen Society and a journal, The Lichenologist. He organised the production and publishing of the first volumes of the journal. Swinscow focused on identification and was also keen on fieldwork. After studying the British macrolichens he then concentrated on the much more challenging pyrenocarp lichens. In the 1950s these were poorly understood and classified. He later concentrated on aquatic and marine pyrenocarps. His collaborators included Peter James. From 1969 Swinscow focused on macrolichen flora of East Africa in collaboration with the Norwegian Hildur Krog. They undertook field collections as well as characterisation and revision of the limited existing lichen knowledge of the region, published in 33 scientific publications. After 1988 he was not actively involved in lichenology.

== Publications ==
Swinscow was the author or co-author of 64 scientific publications, the majority about lichens, and four books. The books included:

- 1976 Statistics at Square One, British Medical Association, London (several editions and translations).
- 1988 T. D. V. Swinscow and H. Krog The Macrolichens of East Africa, British Museum (Natural History)

He also wrote two autobiographical books, Reap a Destiny – divagations of a Taoist (1989; his autobiography), and The Mystic Garden (1992).

Among his scientific publications were:

- Krog, H. & Swinscow, T. D. V. (1987) New species and new combinations in some parmelioid lichen genera, with special emphasis on East African taxa. Lichenologist 19 419–431.
- Krog, H. & Swinscow, T. D. V. (1975) Variation in vegetative propagules in the African lichen Parmelia lophogena. Bryologist 78 67–70.
- Swinscow, T. D. V. (1971) Pyrenocarpous lichens: 15. Key to Polyblastia Massal. in the British Isles. Lichenologist 5 92–113.
- Swinscow, T. D. V. (1966) Lichens with bitunicate asci. Nature 210 852–853.
- Swinscow, T. D. V. (1962) An unusual parasymbiont of marine lichens. Nature 194 500–501.
- Swinscow, T. D. V. (1953) Accidental poisoning of young children. Archives of Disease in Childhood 28 26–29.

== Awards and honours ==
He was awarded the Bronze Cross of the Kingdom of the Netherlands for devotion to duty and personal gallantry in action. In 1969 he was given the H. H. Bloomer Award by the Linnean Society of London that is given to amateur naturalists who have made an important contribution to biological knowledge.

Several genera and species of lichen are named after him. These include the genus Swinscowia. He characterised what became the type species in 1967 as a species within the genus Geisleria. After several taxonomic revisions it was named Swinscowia in 2020. The other species are Dermatina swinscowii Riedl, in Sydowia (1964) 17: 104; (since reduced to synonymy with Arthothelium lirellans (Almq.) Coppins) in Lichenologist (1979) 11: 28, Parmelia swinscowii Hale, in Phytologia (1973) 27: 4. and Polyblastiopsis swinscowii Riedl, in Lichenologist (1979) 11: 47.

== Personal life ==
In 1941 he married Josephine Earle and they had three daughters together.
