= Candelariella biatorina =

Scientific classification
- Kingdom: Fungi
- Division: Ascomycota
- Class: Candelariomycetes
- Order: Candelariales
- Family: Candelariaceae
- Genus: Candelariella
- Species: C. biatorina

Binomial name
- Candelariella biatorina M.Westb. (2007)

Species of lichen

Candelariella biatorina is a species of corticolous (bark-dwelling), crustose lichen in the family Candelariaceae. It is characterised by its distinct yellow hue and apothecia that are biatorine in form. The lichen grows on the trunks of various conifer species across the western United States, and in the Russian Far East.

== Taxonomy ==
Candelariella biatorina was officially described in 2007 by Swedish lichenologist Martin Westberg. Its type specimen was discovered in the Sequoia National Park, located in Tulare County, California, USA. The specimen was found on the western side of Clover Creek, west of the Lodgepole Visitor Center. Positioned on the south-facing hillside alongside a stream, within a mature fir forest featuring some pines, the type specimen was found growing on a white fir at an elevation of 7,000 ft (2,100 m).

== Description ==
One defining characteristic of Candelariella biatorina is its crustose thallus, made of individual granules or areoles that vary from scattered to crowded, and have a vibrant greenish-yellow to bright yellow surface. The areoles, somewhat rounded to irregular in shape, measure about 0.1–0.3 mm in width and have a coarse texture.

Another defining feature of Candelariella biatorina is its biatorine apothecia. This term refers to the cup-like fruiting bodies of the lichen, where the spores develop. The biatorine apothecia are either sessile or constricted at the base, with diameters ranging from 0.3 to 0.6 mm. C. biatorina appears unique in genus Candelariella in having two types of conidia. The first type, macroconidia, are similar in size to spores, about 5–10 by 3–5 μm and are produced in pycnidia with wide open, crater-like ostioles. The species also produces pycnidia similar to others in the genus, with small conidia, about 2.5–4 by 1.5–2 μm.

In terms of chemical composition, calycin, pulvic acid lactone, vulpinic acid, and pulvinic acid have all been detected in Candelariella biatorina. The expected results of standard chemical spot tests are K+ (red), KC−, and C−.

== Similar species ==
Candelariella biatorina can be readily distinguished from other species in its genus due to its truly biatorine apothecia coupled with its distinct yellow thallus. It is often mistaken for Candelariella deppeanae, found in Northern Mexico and Southern Arizona, which features a granular thallus and apothecia that become convex with age. Candelariella biatorina has previously been misidentified as C. aurella and C. reflexa due to certain similarities in appearance and habitat. However, the distinct characteristics of C. biatorina, including its vivid yellow thallus and truly biatorine apothecia, allow for clear differentiation from these species.

== Habitat and distribution ==
This lichen species prefers to grow on the trunks of various conifers, with known hosts including Douglas fir, white fir, and lodgepole pine. It also has been found on dead branches of juniper species. Candelariella biatorina prefers relatively open montane conifer forests, and it is known to thrive up to an elevation of 2,700 m (8,900 ft).

While this lichen species has been identified in scattered locations across California, Colorado, Montana, Idaho, and Oregon, the majority of the specimens have been found within restricted areas in California and Colorado. However, it is likely a widespread species within the montane conifer forests of western North America. In 2013, it was reported from the Russian Far East, from both Yakutia and from the Magadan Oblast, where it was found growing on dead larch twigs.
