= Candelariella vainioana =

Scientific classification
- Kingdom: Fungi
- Division: Ascomycota
- Class: Candelariomycetes
- Order: Candelariales
- Family: Candelariaceae
- Genus: Candelariella
- Species: C. vainioana

Binomial name
- Candelariella vainioana Hakul. (1954)

Species of lichen in the family Candelariaceae

Candelariella vainioana is a species of crustose lichen in the family Candelariaceae. It was described by Finnish lichenologist Rainar Hakulinen in 1954 from collections made by Edvard August Vainio in Hollola in 1874. The specific epithet vainioana honours Vainio. The lichen has been reported from Finland, Sweden, and Norway. The lichen's common name in Swedish is kopparägglav, and kuparikeltuaisjäkälä in Finnish, both of which mean "copper egg-yolk". As of 2019, it is considered to be an endangered species in Finland due to its small population.
