= Opeltiella =

Scientific classification
- Kingdom: Fungi
- Division: Ascomycota
- Class: Candelariomycetes
- Order: Candelariales
- Family: Candelariaceae
- Genus: Opeltiella; S.Y.Kondr. (2020)

Type species
- Opeltiella fruticans (Poelt & Oberw.) S.Y.Kondr. (2020)

Species
- O. canadensis O. fibrosoides O. fruticans

Genus of lichens

Opeltiella is a genus of lichen-forming fungi in the family Candelariaceae. The genus, established by Sergey Kondratyuk in 2020, has three species. It is differentiated from the similar genus Candelaria by its unique features such as eight-spored asci and absence of a lower cortical layer and true rhizines. The genus is characterised by its areolate to more or less squamulose or foliose thallus and the unique chemical substances it contains, such as calycin, pulvinic and vulpinic acids, and pulvinic acid lactone.

== Taxonomy ==
The genus Opeltiella was circumscribed by the Ukrainian lichenologist Sergey Kondratyuk, with Opeltiella fruticans serving as the type species. Its name is derived from an anagram of the generic name Poeltia, which pays homage to Josef Poelt (1924–1995), a significant figure in the history of lichenology and a co-author of the type species of this genus. Opeltiella shares a relationship with Candelaria based on multigene molecular phylogenetics data but is distinguished by its unique features such as the lack of a lower cortical layer and true rhizines.

According to Kondratyuk, multigene phylogeny data supports Opeltiella as a robust, distinct monophyletic branch, positioned separately from Candelaria, which only includes polyspored species with well-developed lower cortical layers and true rhizines. In the phylogeny derived from nuclear ribosomal internal transcribed spacer (nrITS) sequences, Opeltiella occupies a sister position to the 'Candelariella' placodizans group. However, an ITS-based family analysis found no corroborating support for Opeltiella and cautioned that erecting new genera on currently available loci is premature; moreover, one ITS sequence attributed to O. fruticans falls within a Candelinella clade. The authors stress that multilocus data and congruent anatomical evidence are needed before further generic segregation is accepted.

== Description ==
Opeltiella is recognised by its areolate to somewhat squamulose or somewhat foliose thallus, which is irregularly incised and can range from being adnate to ascending or more or less erect. Its upper surface is yellow, matte, and smooth; it may lack soredia and isidia or can display a sorediate lower surface. The lower surface of the thallus is white, lacks a cortex, and ranges from being arachnoid to tomentose with a thick mat of hyphal strands. The apothecia of Opeltiella are lecanorine and its asci are 8-spored. The ascospores are simple to 1-septate, narrowly ellipsoid, and the conidia are ellipsoid, measuring 2.0–3.5 by 1.5 μm.

== Habitat and distribution ==
The genus Opeltiella includes three species, with two located in South America and one in North America. There is an indication that one species, Opeltiella canadensis, might be included in a different genus in the future. Opeltiella lichens can be found in various habitats, ranging from dead shrubs and cacti, sometimes cohabiting with Teloschistes hosseusianus in dry high-altitude pasture lands of about 2,200 m (7,200 ft) above sea level, as well as on the bark of deciduous trees and pine trees in lowlands and coastal zones.

== Species ==
- Opeltiella canadensis (H.Magn.) S.Y.Kondr. (2020)
- Opeltiella fibrosoides (M.Westb. & Frödén) S.Y.Kondr. (2020)
- Opeltiella fruticans (Poelt & Oberw.) S.Y.Kondr. (2020)

The taxon Opeltiella rubrisoli (D.Liu & Hur) S.Y.Kondr. (2020) has since been shown to group in the genus Candelariella and was transferred to that genus in 2025 as Candelariella rubrisoli.
