= Candelariella boikoi =

Scientific classification
- Domain: Eukaryota
- Kingdom: Fungi
- Division: Ascomycota
- Class: Candelariomycetes
- Order: Candelariales
- Family: Candelariaceae
- Genus: Candelariella
- Species: C. boikoi

Binomial name
- Candelariella boikoi Khodos. & S.Y.Kondr. (2004)

Species of lichen

Candelariella boikoi is a species of corticolous (bark-dwelling) crustose lichen in the family Candelariaceae. The lichen forms irregular, pale grey to grey-green patches on woody substrates, primarily colonizing the thickened twigs and branch bases of Halocnemum strobilaceum in arid, saline Eurasian semi-desert steppes. Unlike the common egg-yolk lichen Candelariella aurella, C. boikoi lacks a proper cortical skin and instead features a mosaic of algal cells embedded in fungal tissue, with abundant yellow-disced fruiting bodies rimmed by a distinctive golden-yellow margin.

== Taxonomy ==
The species was formally described by Alexander Khodosovtsev and Sergey Kondratyuk, on the basis of Ukrainian collections taken from the salty steppe shrub Halocnemum strobilaceum. The holotype, collected on the Chonhar Peninsula (Kherson Oblast) in May 1996, resides in the Kiev herbarium (KW). The authors named the lichen in honour of Professor Mikhail Boiko, a Ukrainian botanist noted for work on steppe ecology. Within Candelariella it belongs to a small cluster of eight-spored, faintly pigmented species whose thalli lack the usual bright yellow colours. It differs from close relatives such as C. oleaginescens and C. plumbea by its thicker, tuberculate (warty) thallus and by the golden-yellow margin that rims its fruiting discs.

Although superficially like the common egg-yolk lichen C. aurella, C. boikoi never develops a proper cortical skin. Instead, its outermost layer is a mosaic of algal cells embedded in fungal tissue (an algal plectenchyma).

== Description ==
The lichen forms irregular patches up to about 1.5 mm thick on its woody substrate. Its thallus (the lichen body) is pale grey to grey-green and broken into crowded, mound-like areoles 0.2–0.4 mm across; the surface is distinctly uneven, giving twigs a finely pustular texture. Because it lacks a discrete cortex, the algal cells that provide photosynthesis lie just beneath a thin, clear fungal layer only 2–4 micrometres (μm) deep. Individual algal cells are 7–14 μm in diameter and are embedded in a spongy mass of fungal hyphae about 50–90 μm thick.

Fruiting bodies (apothecia) are abundant, often clustering together. They measure 0.5–1.2 mm in diameter and are flat to gently concave. The disc is dull yellow, while the thalline margin is a brighter golden yellow and slightly crenulate. Inside, the colourless hymenium (spore-bearing tissue) contains simple paraphyses 1.6–1.8 μm wide with swollen tips, and cylindrical asci that each bear eight narrowly ellipsoid spores (14.5–17.5 × 4.2–5.0 μm). Minute flask-shaped pycnidia are immersed in the thallus; their openings sometimes appear as tiny yellow dots, releasing ellipsoid conidia about 3 × 1.6 μm.

== Habitat and distribution ==
Candelariella boikoi is adapted to the arid, saline conditions of Eurasian semi-desert steppes. It most commonly colonises the thickened twigs and branch bases of Halocnemum strobilaceum, a salt-tolerant shrub that dominates these landscapes. Less frequently it is found on the bark of other shrubs, small branches lying on the ground, and even plant debris. Its associates in this habitat include equally drought-tolerant lichens such as Lecania zinaidae and Caloplaca scythica.

The species is known from several scattered localities: the northern coast of the Crimean Isthmus (Ukraine), the Syvash brine lagoons and neighbouring Kherson steppes, sandy islets in the Sea of Azov, salt flats near Lake Baskunchak in the Russian Lower Volga, and a single record from the botanical garden in Almaty, Kazakhstan. These records suggest a broad but discontinuous range extending across the southernmost fringes of the Eurasian steppe belt, wherever suitable salty microhabitats and woody hosts occur.
