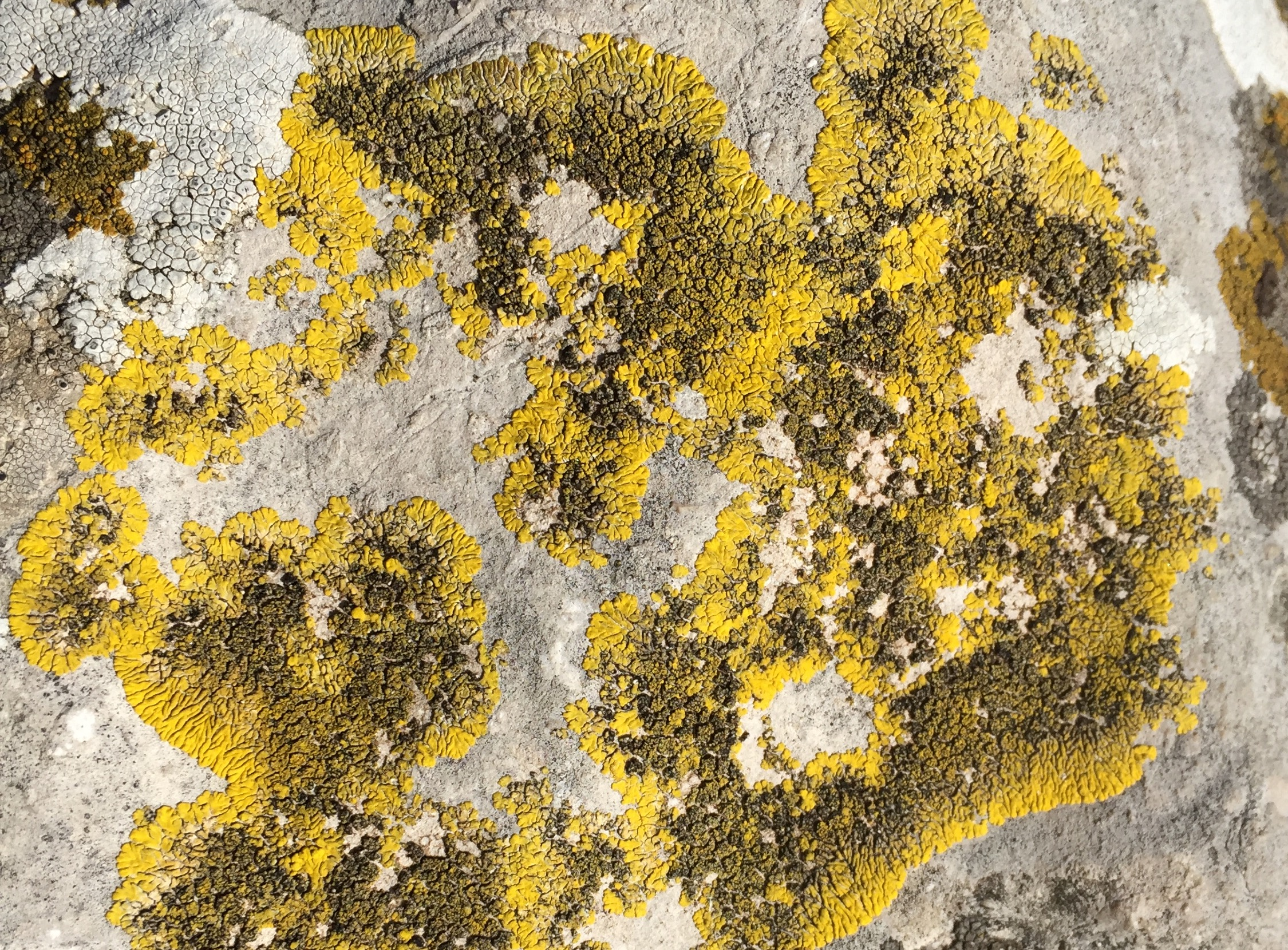
- on Triest karst in Rosandra, Italy

Scientific classification
- Kingdom: Fungi
- Division: Ascomycota
- Class: Candelariomycetes
- Order: Candelariales
- Family: Candelariaceae
- Genus: Candelariella
- Species: C. medians

Binomial name
- Candelariella medians (Nyl.) A.L.Sm. (1918)

Synonyms
- List: Placodium medians Nyl. (1862); Physcia medians (Nyl.) Arnold (1863); Xanthoria medians (Nyl.) Zwackh (1864); Lecanora medians (Nyl.) Nyl. (1866); Amphiloma medians (Nyl.) Bagl. (1871); Gasparrinia medians (Nyl.) P.Syd. (1887); Caloplaca medians (Nyl.) Flagey (1888); Candelaria medians (Nyl.) Flagey (1891); Candelariella medians f. steepholmensis O.L.Gilbert (1981)

= Candelariella medians =

Species of lichen

Candelariella medians is a species of crustose lichen in the family Candelariaceae. It was first described in 1862 by the Finnish lichenologist William Nylander from specimens found growing on stones in Paris's Jardin du Luxembourg. The species forms distinctive yellow, radiating crusts up to 3 cm across on lime-rich surfaces affected by human activity, particularly in churchyards and on old buildings. It is abundant in southern and eastern England but occurs throughout Europe, typically growing on calcareous masonry such as limestone memorials, church walls, and gravestones.

== Taxonomy ==
The Finnish lichenologist William Nylander introduced the species in 1862 as Placodium medians in a short Paris note, based on material he saw "on the stones of the Jardin du Luxembourg", where he considered it fairly common and often growing with Placodium murorum (now Calogaya saxicola) and Placodium callopismum (Variospora aurantia). In distinguishing his taxon, he stressed that its spores are simple (non-septate), in contrast to the two-celled spores of Pl. murorum, and he remarked on its egg-yolk yellow thallus and apothecial margin; these were features that, to him, recalled Lecanora vitellina (Candelariella vitellina).

Nylander's taxon has been shuffled to about a half dozen genera in its taxonomic history over the next several decades, until being reclassified in Candelariella by the British lichenologist Annie Lorrain Smith in 1918.

In 1981, Oliver Gilbert and colleagues described a citrine-green chemotype as Candelariella medians f. steepholmensis, based on a small patch on the island of Steep Holm, North Somerset, where it grew intermingled with typical yellow thalli on a nutrient-enriched Carboniferous-era limestone cliff. Thin-layer chromatography showed pulvinic dilactone and pulvinic acid in both forms, but calycin only in the typical form; the green form was sterile, and the authors judged the rank of form most appropriate for this scattered chemotype.

== Description ==
Candelariella medians forms a placodioid thallus (a crust that expands from the centre but has a fringe of small lobes at the edge) up to about 3 cm across. It is usually round and radiating, with the marginal lobes mostly touching one another. The thallus is yellow; the surface can feel slightly rough or appear dusted with a fine, pale bloom (pruina). Towards the centre the texture changes from granular-areolate (broken into tiny, block-like patches) to very finely coralloid-isidiate, where minute, coral-like outgrowths function as vegetative propagules. The centre is often the same colour as the margin, but commonly turns greyish by comparison. Individual lobes are 0.3–1 mm wide and may lie flat or become gently convex; they are typically contiguous but can be separate or overlapping.

The fruiting bodies (apothecia) are occasional, small (0.3–1.2 mm in diameter), dull yellow, and flat to slightly convex. Their margin is smooth to finely scalloped. Each sac (ascus) contains eight ascospores. The ascospores measure 11–17 × 4–6 micrometres, are usually non-septate (without an internal cross-wall, though a single septum may sometimes appear), and vary in outline from ellipsoidal or cylindrical to tear-drop or slipper-shaped.

A citrine-green form, f. steepholmensis, resembles the typical morphology but lacks calycin and has not been seen fertile; it was described from Steep Holm, Somerset.

== Habitat and distribution ==
Candelariella medians grows on lime-rich substrates affected by human activity, from shade to full sun. Typical sites include churchyards, village buildings and walls. It is uncommon in natural habitats, occurring mainly on nutrient-enriched rock and calcareous bird perches. It is abundant in southern and eastern England, but less common throughout other parts of Britain. In Italy, the species is typically found in mild-temperate regions on human-made calcareous surfaces such as churches, monuments, park statues and gravestones. It is most frequent above the Mediterranean belt, but also occurs in natural situations on the tops of isolated calcareous boulders, and is especially common in small villages along the eastern Apennine Mountains. In urban Britain it is characteristic of old limestone memorials and other calcareous masonry; around London it was locally abundant on eighteenth–nineteenth-century headstones and chest tombs (and, more rarely, concrete), often occurring with nitrophilous associates in the Caloplacetum heppianae community, which is maintained by bird droppings on horizontal ledges and grave-tops. In his 1967 report of the British lichen funga, Jack Laundon recorded thriving patches on the limestone walls at "The Fountain", Kensington Gardens, and treated the species as a selective, sometimes dominant, member of that community.
