= Candelariella corviniscalensis =

Scientific classification
- Kingdom: Fungi
- Division: Ascomycota
- Class: Candelariomycetes
- Order: Candelariales
- Family: Candelariaceae
- Genus: Candelariella
- Species: C. corviniscalensis

Binomial name
- Candelariella corviniscalensis C.A.Morse & M.Westb. (2011)
- Type locality: El Paso County, Colorado, U.S.

Species of lichen-forming fungus

Candelariella corviniscalensis is a species of rock-dwelling lichen in the family Candelariaceae. It grows mostly within the rock, visible only as a pale grey patch on the sandstone surface, and produces small yellow to orange-yellow fruiting bodies. The species was described in 2011 from a single locality on Late Cretaceous sandstone in Colorado. Despite searches of similar rock types elsewhere in the western United States, no additional populations have been found.

== Taxonomy ==
Candelariella corviniscalensis was described as a new species in 2011 by Caleb Morse and Martin Westberg, based on material collected from a single locality in El Paso County, Colorado, United States. The type collection came from The Nature Conservancy's Bohart Ranch, in the locally named "Crow's Roost" area along Black Squirrel Creek, at about 1,725–1,750 m (5,660–5,740 ft) elevation, on friable Fox Hills sandstone (Late Cretaceous).

The species epithet corviniscalensis refers to "Crow's Roost", the only known locality of the species. DNA sequence data (internal transcribed spacer ribosomal DNA) placed the species within the Candelariella rosulans group and suggested a close relationship to C. rosulans, but with weak support; on morphological grounds it was retained in Candelariella. The species is separated from similar Candelariella taxa by its endolithic (rock-inhabiting) thallus, its biatorine apothecia, and its comparatively long ascospores.

== Description ==
The thallus is endolithic (growing mostly within the rock), and is usually visible only as a pale, slightly powdery gray patch on the sandstone surface. The photobiont is a green alga with rounded (chlorococcoid) cells about 10–25 μm across. The apothecia are biatorine (lacking a thalline rim), yellow to orange-yellow, strongly convex, and typically 0.3–1.2 mm in diameter; they may be scattered or gathered in small groups.

Microscopically, the hymenium is colorless and about 100–125 μm high, and the asci are club-shaped (clavate) and 8-spored. The ascospores are usually simple (non-septate), but some are 1-septate and a few have 2–3 septa. They are narrowly ellipsoid to somewhat spindle-shaped (fusiform), often slightly narrowed toward one end, measuring 17–27 × 4–6 μm (with extremes of 12–35 × 3.5–7 μm recorded). Pycnidia may be present. The conidia are oblong to ellipsoid, about 3–4 × 1.2–1.7 μm. Chemical analyses detected calycin together with pulvinic acid and pulvinic acid dilactone. In terms of chemical spot tests, the thallus gives a K+ (reddish) reaction (KC−, C−).

== Habitat and distribution ==
Candelariella corviniscalensis is known only from the type locality in Colorado, where it grows directly on non-calcareous Fox Hills sandstone. At the site it was collected from seepage tracks and shallow, weathered depressions on the upper surface of a massive sandstone outcrop. Associated lichens included species of Acarospora, Buellia, Caloplaca, Candelariella (including C. rosulans), Rinodina, and Sarcogyne. Searches of similar outcrops (including Fox Hills sandstone near Boulder, and other friable sandstones in Colorado, Montana, Utah, and Wyoming) did not reveal any additional populations.

At the type locality, it appears to occupy a slightly different microhabitat from the similar Candelariella rosulans: C. corviniscalensis was concentrated in weathered depressions and seepage tracks, while C. rosulans was more broadly distributed across the sandstone surface, especially on minor raised areas. The type material also shows an unusually frequent production of septate spores (about 28% with one or more septa). Another related endemic of the Fox Hills sandstone is Candelariella clarkiae, which differs from C. corviniscalensis in its epilithic thallus and immersed, pseudolecanorine apothecia.
