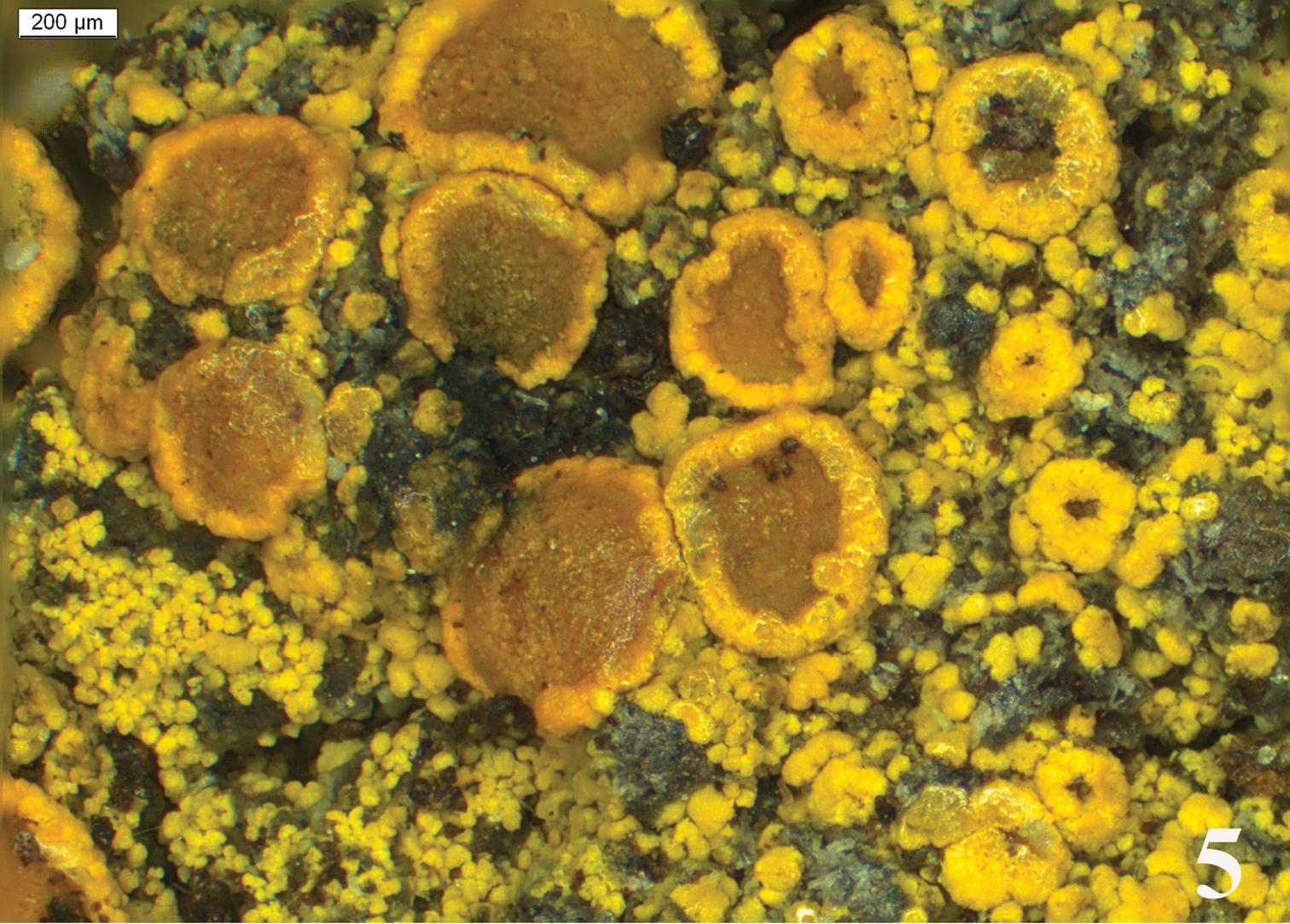

Scientific classification
- Kingdom: Fungi
- Division: Ascomycota
- Class: Candelariomycetes
- Order: Candelariales
- Family: Candelariaceae
- Genus: Candelariella
- Species: C. granuliformis

Binomial name
- Candelariella granuliformis M.Westb. (2011)
- Type locality: Wollaston Peninsula, Nunavut, Canada

= Candelariella granuliformis =

Species of lichen-forming fungus

Candelariella granuliformis is a species of terricolous (ground-dwelling) crustose lichen in the family Candelariaceae. It forms a yellow crust made up of tiny granules that break apart into smaller fragments for asexual reproduction. Fruiting bodies are rarely produced. The species occurs in arctic and alpine habitats across northern Canada, Scandinavia, and the mountains of the western United States.

== Taxonomy ==
Candelariella granuliformis was described as a new species in 2011 by Martin Westberg, based on material from the Canadian Arctic. The type collection is from Nunavut (Victoria Island, Wollaston Peninsula, Falaise Bay), where it was found at about 100 m elevation in xeric (dry), calciferous (lime-rich) mountain heath. The holotype was collected on 24 July 1999 by Jan-Eric Mattsson (collection number 5209) and is housed in the herbarium of Uppsala University (UPS).

The epithet granuliformis ("granule-like") refers to the thallus, which is made up of tiny granules that tend to break apart into blastidia (small asexual propagules). In a phylogenetic analysis based on internal transcribed spacer (ITS) ribosomal DNA sequences, the species grouped with other polyspored taxa in the Candelariella vitellina group and was recovered close to C. vitellina, the type species of the genus. Two specimens were sequenced (the Canadian holotype and a Swedish specimen), and the sequences differed at only two nucleotide positions.

In herbarium material, C. granuliformis was often filed under the name C. xanthostigma, but that species grows on bark or wood and has a more uniform granular thallus. The new species also differs from many other soredia-making Candelariella species in that it does not form distinct, bounded soralia. Instead, the granules break down in a more irregular way across the thallus surface.

== Description ==
The thallus is crustose and consists of discrete, rounded granules that may be scattered or crowded; as they develop they can look somewhat areolate (broken into discrete angular patches), with individual units about 0.1–0.2 mm wide. The surface is yellow to bright yellow and smooth, and many granules disintegrate into much smaller propagules interpreted as blastidia, usually between 35 and 80 micrometres (μm) in diameter. The photobiont (photosynthetic partner) is a chlorococcoid green alga.

Apothecia are uncommon (only a few fertile specimens were seen). When present, they are lecanorine and usually small, about 0.3–0.5 mm in diameter (ranging from 0.2–0.8 mm). The disc is yellow to slightly darker yellow than the thallus and is flat to convex in larger apothecia. Microscopically, the hymenium is colourless and about 90–115 μm high, the epihymenium is yellow to golden-brown with fine granular crystals, and the clavate asci are polyspored (typically about 16–20 spores per ascus). The ascospores are mostly simple (non-septate), only rarely with a thin septum, and are usually narrowly ellipsoid but variable to almost oblong, measuring 9.5–13 × 4–5.5 μm (with extremes of 8.5–14 × 3–6 μm recorded). Pycnidia were not observed.

Chemical analyses detected calycin together with pulvinic acid lactone and pulvinic acid. The thallus reacts to spot tests K+ (reddish), KC−, and C−.

== Habitat and distribution ==
Candelariella granuliformis is an arctic–alpine species that grows on soil, bryophytes, and plant debris on the ground in open tundra and exposed mountain habitats. It is known from scattered localities in arctic North America, and also from high-elevation sites in the western United States, including mountain ranges of the Sierra Nevada and the Rocky Mountains.

In Europe, it has been reported from alpine Scandinavia and the Alps. In Sweden it has been collected in Padjelanta National Park (Lule lappmark), both on bryophytes and plant debris on the ground near the Duvggejåhkå river on the south slope of Mount Unna Duvgge and on bryophytes growing on rock along the Nordkalott trail.
