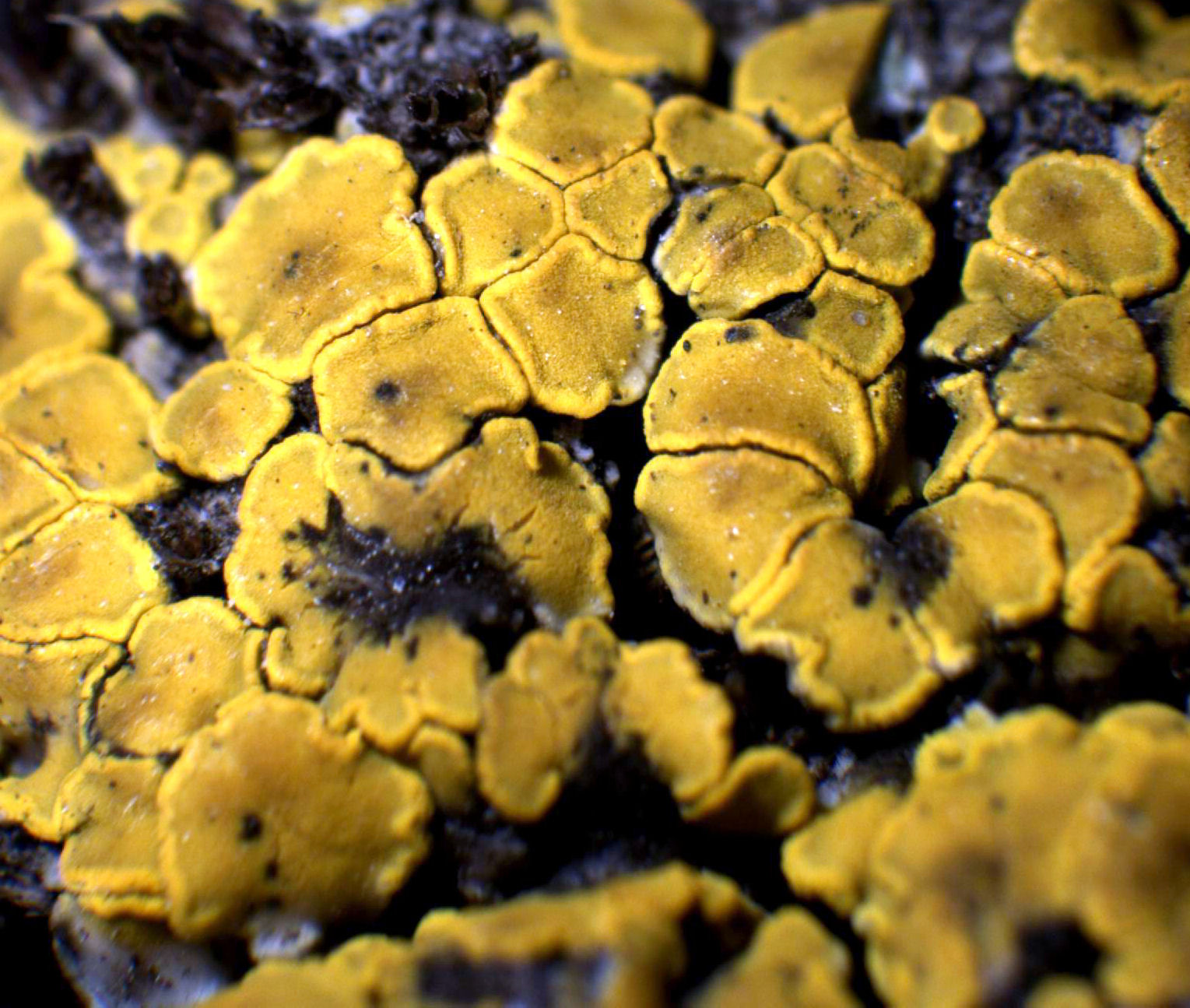

Scientific classification
- Kingdom: Fungi
- Division: Ascomycota
- Class: Candelariomycetes
- Order: Candelariales
- Family: Candelariaceae
- Genus: Candelariella
- Species: C. commutata

Binomial name
- Candelariella commutata Otte & M.Westb. (2013)
- Holotype: Republic of Adyghea, Western Caucausus

= Candelariella commutata =

Species of lichen

Candelariella commutata is a species of arctic–alpine, ground-dwelling, yellow crustose lichen in the family Candelariaceae. Formally described as new in 2013, the lichen forms bright egg-yolk-yellow crusts on calcareous soil and rock debris, typically growing above the tree line in arctic and alpine environments. It is known from the Caucasus, the Alps, high-elevation sites in Scandinavia, and the Russian Arctic, where it inhabits lime-rich ground in mountain fissures and detritus.

== Taxonomy ==
Candelariella commutata was described in 2013 from Caucasian and European material that had long been filed under the name Candelariella unilocularis by some authors. The latter name, however, traces back to Alexander Elenkin's var. unilocularis, which was shown to belong within C. aurella; subsequent Scandinavian and Alpine usages of "unilocularis" conflated different entities, prompting Volker Otte and Martin Westberg to formally describe C. commutata as a distinct species. The holotype is from the Western Caucasus (Republic of Adyghea), on calcareous rock around 1,950 m elevation, collected on 6 September 1998.

== Description ==
The thallus (the lichen body) forms a thin crust scattered as bright egg-yolk-yellow granules or tiny scales that sit flat on the substrate; in older material it may persist mainly as a yellow rim around the fruiting bodies. Apothecia (the disc-like spore-producing structures) begin immersed, then become exposed, usually flat and round but often developing lobed outlines, reaching about 2 mm across or a little more. The discs are yellow to ochre-yellow, often with a persistent, thick thalline margin (a raised rim formed by the thallus). A compact proper exciple (the apothecial wall) of elongated, thick-walled cells underlies the hymenium. The apothecial surface carries a fine dusting (epipsamma) of minute brownish-yellow crystals.

The hymenium (spore-bearing layer) is about 80 micrometres (μm) high; asci are of the Candelaria-type and contain eight spores. Ascospores are characteristically long sausage-shaped (farciminiform), typically 20–28 (less often up to 32) × 5–7.5 μm, with simple to sparsely branched paraphyses about 2 μm wide. Secondary metabolites detected by high-performance thin-layer chromatography analysis include calycin, pulvinic acid, and pulvic acid lactone. spot tests results on thallus material are K+ (slightly reddish), KC−, and C−. Some geographic variation has been noted: alpine and Scandinavian specimens tend to have somewhat shorter spores (often 18–24 μm), and paraphysis tips can differ subtly between Caucasian and northern material.

=== Similar species ===
Candelariella commutata can be mistaken for two other yellow, soil-inhabiting species. Compared with C. canadensis, it has larger spores (C. canadensis usually 11–15.5 μm long and tapering a little at the ends) and keeps a thick, persistent margin instead of becoming strongly convex with an excluded rim. From C. aggregata, it differs in having much larger, often rim-raised apothecia and a proper exciple composed of elongated, thick-walled cells (C. aggregata has smaller discs with a thin, usually not raised margin and rounded, thin-walled exciple cells).

== Habitat and distribution ==
This is an arctic–alpine species of calcareous terrain. It grows on soil and plant detritus over lime-rich ground, for example across fissures in calcareous rocks, typically above tree line. Confirmed records are from the alpine belt of the Caucasus and the Alps, a few high-elevation localities in Scandinavia, and Novaya Zemlya in the Russian Arctic.
