= Candelariella ruzgarii =

Scientific classification
- Domain: Eukaryota
- Kingdom: Fungi
- Division: Ascomycota
- Class: Candelariomycetes
- Order: Candelariales
- Family: Candelariaceae
- Genus: Candelariella
- Species: C. ruzgarii

Binomial name
- Candelariella ruzgarii Halıcı, A.M.Kahraman & Güllü (2022)

Species of lichen

Candelariella ruzgarii is a species of terricolous (ground-dwelling) crustose lichen in the family Candelariaceae. Found in Antarctica, it was described as new to science in 2022.

== Taxonomy ==
Candelariella ruzgarii was described as a new species in 2023 by Mehmet Gökhan Halıcı and colleagues based on samples collected from Antarctica. This species is closely related to Candelariella aurella and C. plumbea, forming a distinct clade in the internal transcribed spacer, mtSSU, and RPB1 phylogenetic analyses. The species is named in honour of Rüzgar Kağan Halıcı, the son of the first author, reflecting personal sacrifices during Antarctic expeditions. The type locality for this species is James Ross Island in the Antarctic Peninsula.

== Description ==
Candelariella ruzgarii has a crustose, granular thallus that ranges in colour from yellow to orange-yellow, with younger portions sometimes showing a greenish tinge. It produces lecanorine apothecia (fruiting bodies) that are abundant and range from 0.2 to 1.2 mm in diameter. The apothecia display a flat or slightly concave disc when young and become more convex and orange-brownish yellow with age. The species has hyaline, aseptate, ellipsoid to oblong ascospores measuring 11–16 by 4.5–7.5 μm. The thalline margin is up to 0.2 mm thick, sometimes slightly crenulate.

== Habitat, distribution, and ecology ==
This lichen is known only from Antarctica, specifically collected from James Ross Island and Horseshoe Island. It grows on soil or over other terricolous lichens, differentiating it from its relatives that typically grow on calcareous rocks.
