= Opeltiella fruticans =

Scientific classification
- Kingdom: Fungi
- Division: Ascomycota
- Class: Candelariomycetes
- Order: Candelariales
- Family: Candelariaceae
- Genus: Opeltiella
- Species: O. fruticans

Binomial name
- Opeltiella fruticans (Poelt & Oberw.) S.Y.Kondr. (2020)

Synonyms
- Candelaria fruticans Poelt & Oberw. (1974)

Species of lichen

Opeltiella fruticans is a species of lichen in the family Candelariaceae. Described as a new species in 1974 (as Candelaria fruticans), it is a small shrubby, soil-dwelling lichen with ascending lobes. It is known from Venezuela and from Costa Rica, Peru, Kenya and South Africa; although the type material is terricolous/muscicolous, most other records are corticolous (bark-dwelling) on woody hosts at mid- to high elevations.

== Taxonomy ==
The species was described in 1974 by the lichenologists Josef Poelt and Franz Oberwinkler as Candelaria fruticans. The type specimen was collected in March 1969 from the Sierra de Santo Domingo in Mérida State, Venezuela, at 3,500–3,800 m elevation, with additional material from La Pedregosa near Mérida at about 2,000 m. In 2020, Sergey Kondratyuk transferred Candelaria fruticans to Opeltiella as Opeltiella fruticans, based on multi-gene analyses that split a distinct candelarioid lineage from Candelaria in the strict sense. They diagnosed Opeltiella by its combination of characters—especially the lack of a well-developed lower cortex and true rhizines—together with terricolous/muscicolous, often ascending to shrubby lobes, which matches the original Venezuelan material described by Poelt and Oberwinkler. South African material was first recognised (as Candelaria fruticans) while re-examining collections misattributed to Xanthoria ascendens, demonstrating the potential for confusion with sorediate, yellow lichens from other families.

Independent analyses have cautioned against recognising Opeltiella on the currently available evidence: an internal transcribed spacer DNA-based family-level phylogeny failed to recover support for two of the three genera proposed by Kondratyuk and colleagues (2020), including Opeltiella, and one published ITS sequence of O. fruticans falls within a Candelinella clade; the authors argue that broader generic changes in Candelariaceae are premature until multilocus datasets and congruent anatomical characters are available.

== Description ==
Opeltiella fruticans has a thallus that attaches to the substrate at its base but soon develops strongly ascending lobes. These lobes are irregularly divided into smaller segments, with their tips appearing ragged or scalloped. The thallus is yellow to yellow-green on the upper side. The underside of the lobes is whitish to pale yellow, becoming covered with a powdery layer of yellow soredia that may extend from the tips to the middle or even to the base. The soredia arise mainly from the ecorticate lower side of the lobes rather than from margins. Rhizines (root-like anchoring structures) are absent or very sparse. The cortex is made of irregularly interwoven fungal hyphae, giving it a patchy thickness of 15–50 μm. No apothecia (fruiting bodies) have been observed, but pycnidia (structures producing asexual spores) are immersed within the thallus. Conidia are ellipsoid, about 2.5–3 × 1.5 μm.

== Habitat and distribution ==
The lichen grows on soil and over mosses in high-elevation habitats. It was first collected in páramo environments of the Venezuelan Andes, particularly the páramo of Mucuchíes near the El Águila pass in Mérida State at 3,500–3,800 m altitude. Additional specimens were found at La Pedregosa, west of Mérida, around 2,000 m. Beyond Venezuela, verified records (as Candelaria fruticans) document a scattered, trans-Atlantic distribution in the tropics and subtropics. In Costa Rica it was found on dry twigs of Cupressus at 2,150 m (Cartago Province); in Peru on shrubs on dry, rocky slopes at roughly 200–500 m (Cerro de Reque, Lambayeque); in Kenya on twigs on deforested hillsides at 2,180–2,400 m (Rift Valley Province, Ngong Hills); and in South Africa on planted trees in the eastern Transvaal, a high-lying escarpment overlooking the Kruger lowlands (Pilgrims Rest District, Graskop). Taken together, these collections indicate that the species is most often corticolous on woody hosts from low- to high-montane belts, with the Venezuelan terricolous type locality an outlier.
