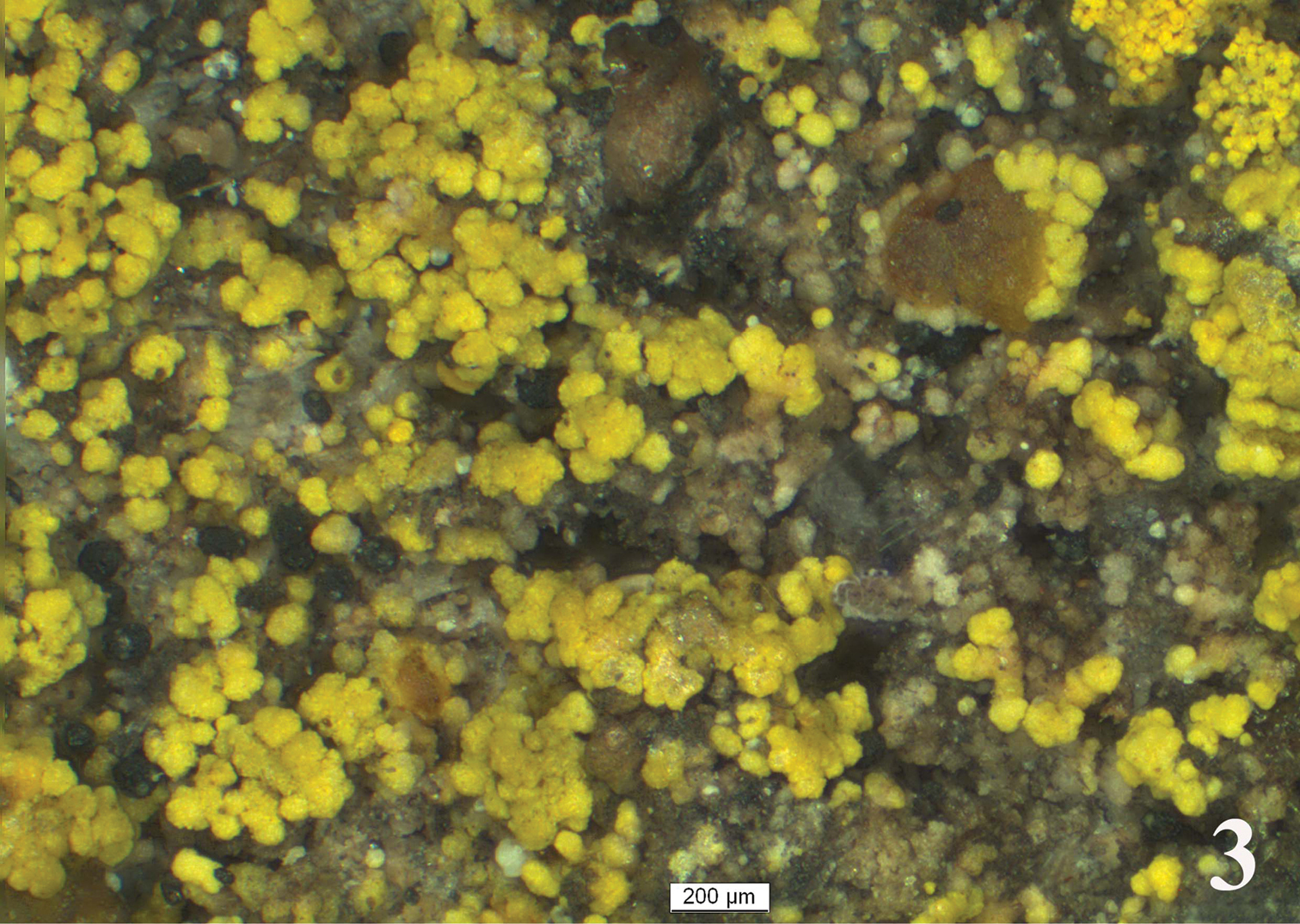

Scientific classification
- Kingdom: Fungi
- Division: Ascomycota
- Class: Candelariomycetes
- Order: Candelariales
- Family: Candelariaceae
- Genus: Candelariella
- Species: C. boleana

Binomial name
- Candelariella boleana Etayo, Palice & T.Sprib. (2009)

= Candelariella boleana =

Species of lichen

Candelariella boleana is a species of lichen in the family Candelariaceae, first described from Europe in 2009. It is distinguished from all other members of its genus by its distinctly spherical ascospores, which are contained in unusually large numbers (16–32) within each spore-bearing structure. The species forms small yellowish granules on the bark of deciduous and coniferous trees in montane forests across southern and central Europe, including Spain, Greece, Slovakia, Germany, and France. C. boleana has likely been overlooked for many years due to its small size and resemblance to the more common Candelariella xanthostigma.

== Taxonomy ==
Candelariella boleana was formally described as a new species in 2009 by the lichenologists Javier Etayo, Zdeněk Palice, and Toby Spribille. The species belongs to the family Candelariaceae, a group of lichens characterized by their distinctive lemon to egg-yellow colouration caused by natural pigments including calycin and pulvinic acids that form small granules in the lichen's surface layers.

The holotype (the original specimen used to formally describe the species) was collected on 5 August 1993, by Javier Etayo and Antonio Gómez-Bolea in the central Pyrenees of Spain. The specimen was found growing on the trunk of a Scots pine (Pinus sylvestris) at 1,100 metres elevation in the Barranco de Santa Elena valley, near Biescas, Huesca province. The species epithet boleana honours Dr. Antonio Gómez-Bolea, a lichenologist and friend of the authors, while also referencing the Spanish word bola (meaning 'ball'), which describes the distinctive ball-like shape of the species' ascospores.

== Description ==
Candelariella boleana forms small, scattered yellowish to greenish granules on tree bark, each measuring 0.05-0.15 millimetres (mm) in diameter. Unlike many lichens that form continuous crusty patches, this species appears as individual tiny bumps that do not connect to form a solid covering. The lichen lacks a prothallus (a preliminary fungal growth stage seen in many lichen species). The reproductive structures (apothecia) are small disc-like formations measuring 0.2–0.4 mm across. These appear bright yellow due to yellow pruina (a powdery coating) and can be either flat or slightly convex as they mature. The apothecia contain the lichen's spore-producing structures.

A distinctive feature of C. boleana is found under microscopic examination: its asci (spore-containing sacs) are club-shaped and unusually large, measuring 35–52 by 14–20 micrometres (μm). Each ascus contains 16–32 spores, which is significantly more than the typical 8 spores found in most lichen species. The spores themselves are perfectly spherical, colourless, and measure 4–5.5 μm in diameter—a unique characteristic that immediately distinguishes this species from all other known Candelariella species.

The lichen's algal partner (photobiont) belongs to the family Chlorococcaceae, with individual algal cells measuring 9–20 μm in diameter. Chemical analysis reveals that the species contains only pulvinic acid, which contributes to its characteristic yellow colouration.

== Habitat and distribution ==
Candelariella boleana has a limited and scattered distribution across southern and central Europe, having been documented in Spain, Greece, and Slovakia. The species appears to be rare, with only eight known collections despite being recognized by researchers for over 15 years. In Spain's Pyrenees mountains (Huesca and Navarra), the species grows on the bark of Scots pine (Pinus sylvestris) and oak (Quercus) trees in woodland environments at elevations between 850 and 1,200 metres above sea level. In Greece, it has been found growing on Mediterranean cypress (Cupressus sempervirens) and stinking juniper (Juniperus foetidissima) at elevations of 1,050 to 1,150 metres.

The Slovak populations represent the species' northernmost known limit, occurring in well-lit, dry oak woodlands dominated by Dalechamp's oak (Quercus dalechampii) and Hungarian oak (Q. polycarpa) on limestone bedrock in Muránska planina National Park in the Western Carpathians, at roughly 550 metres elevation. This region is known for hosting several lichen species that typically have more southern distributions in Europe. Recent discoveries have significantly expanded the known range of C. boleana to include Germany and France. In Germany's Black Forest (Baden-Württemberg), the species has been found growing on European beech (Fagus sylvatica), rowan (Sorbus aucuparia), and sycamore maple (Acer pseudoplatanus) at elevations between 1,200 and 1,350 metres. French populations have been documented in the Vosges Mountains, where it occurs on beech and sycamore maple at elevations of 1,130–1,370 metres in areas receiving high annual precipitation (over 1,500 mm per year).

The species shows a preference for semi-shaded habitats on smooth bark or smooth bark ridges of deciduous trees in montane forest zones. It has been found in mixed beech-maple forests (Aceri-Fagetum), rowan pioneer woodlands, and traditional beech pasture forests. Unlike its close relative C. xanthostigma, which favours more exposed conditions, C. boleana appears to prefer somewhat more sheltered microhabitats while still requiring good light exposure.

Candelariella boleana grows alongside various other lichen species, including Candelariella vitellina, C. xanthostigma, Caloplaca species, and Lecanora pulicaris, among others. The species may be easily overlooked due to its small size and could potentially be confused with the more common C. xanthostigma, which has likely led to it being consistently misidentified in Germany and France until recent careful taxonomic work.

The scattered distribution pattern and rarity of collections suggest that C. boleana may be naturally uncommon, though it is also possible that the species has been overlooked in herbarium collections where it might have been misidentified as other Candelariella species. Its specific ecological requirements appear to include well-lit, somewhat dry conditions on the bark of various coniferous and deciduous trees in Mediterranean and temperate European climates.
