= Candelariella complanata =

Scientific classification
- Kingdom: Fungi
- Division: Ascomycota
- Class: Candelariomycetes
- Order: Candelariales
- Family: Candelariaceae
- Genus: Candelariella
- Species: C. complanata

Binomial name
- Candelariella complanata M.Westb. (2007)

Species of lichen

Candelariella complanata is a species of squamulose (scaly) and saxicolous (rock-dwelling) lichen in the family Candelariaceae. Found in southwestern North America, it was formally described as a new species in 2007 by the Swedish lichenologist Martin Westberg. The type specimen was collected from a cliff of the Sierra Agua Verde (part of the Sierra de San Francisco mountain range, Baja California) at an elevation of about 1,000 m (3,300 ft); here it was found growing on volcanic rock. The thallus of the lichen is complanate (smooth) as a result of its flattened and peltate (like a shield or plate attached on the lower surface) squamules. This gives it a distinct appearance that is referenced in the specific epithet complanata. The geographic range of Candelariella complanata includes Baja California, Coahuila, Sinaloa, and Sonora, north to southern Arizona, Texas, and New Mexico. It prefers to grow on siliceous rock in open montane habitats to elevations of at least 1,900 m (6,200 ft).
