= Candelariella immarginata =

Scientific classification
- Kingdom: Fungi
- Division: Ascomycota
- Class: Candelariomycetes
- Order: Candelariales
- Family: Candelariaceae
- Genus: Candelariella
- Species: C. immarginata

Binomial name
- Candelariella immarginata M.Westb. (2007)

Species of lichen

Candelariella immarginata is a species of parasitic, saxicolous (rock-dwelling) lichen in the family Candelariaceae. Found in the United States, it was formally described as a new species in 2007 by Swedish lichenologist Martin Westberg. The type specimen was collected in the desert west of Grantsville, Utah at an elevation of 4,300 ft (1,300 m); here it was found growing on dry exposed quartzite. At the time of publication, it had also been found in another location in Utah, and two locations in Nevada; its general geographic range is the Great Basin in western North America. In 2015, it was recorded from the White Mountains of California. The species is lichenicolous on Aspicilia species and pyrenocarpous lichens. The specific epithet immarginata refers to the lack of a thalline margin on the apothecia. Secondary compounds that have been detected in the lichen (using high-performance liquid chromatography) include calycin, pulvic acid lactone, vulpinic acid, and pulvinic acid.
