= Candelariella lichenicola =

Scientific classification
- Kingdom: Fungi
- Division: Ascomycota
- Class: Candelariomycetes
- Order: Candelariales
- Family: Candelariaceae
- Genus: Candelariella
- Species: C. lichenicola

Binomial name
- Candelariella lichenicola M.Westb. (2007)

Species of lichen

Candelariella lichenicola is a rare species of lichenicolous (lichen-dwelling) fungus in the family Candelariaceae. This species was first found in Sonora, Mexico, and is characterised by its distinct spore shape and chemical composition. It is typically found growing on the lichen species Candelina submexicana, and while not widespread, it contributes to the ecological diversity of the regions it inhabits.

== Taxonomy ==
Candelariella lichenicola was first described by Swedish lichenologist Martin Westberg in 2007. The specific epithet lichenicola is derived from Latin, with lichen referring to its habitat and cola meaning "dweller" – together indicating that this species "dwells on lichens". The type specimen was found by Thomas Hawkes Nash III in 1975 in a canyon above the mining town of Trinidad, located in Sonora, Mexico, at an elevation of 4,060 ft (1,240 m). This fungus belongs to the family Candelariaceae, which is known for a characteristic apical dome in the ascus of the fungi.

== Description ==
While many species of fungi feature a thallus, or vegetative tissue, Candelariella lichenicola does not. Instead, it is defined by its distinctive biatorine apothecia, which are tiny, cup-shaped structures that contain the spore-producing organs. These apothecia emerge from the algal layer of its host lichen, with a diameter up to 0.25 mm. Its ascospores, the sexual spores within the asci, are more or less citriform (lemon-shaped) with pointed ends, and have typical dimensions of 11.5–14.0 by 4.5–5.0 μm.

The epihymenium, the outermost layer of the fungal tissue, is reddish yellow to yellow-brown in colour, while the hymenium (the layer beneath the epihymenium) is colourless. The hymenium is moderately tall, ranging between 45 and 55 μm.

Two main secondary chemicals have been found in this species: calycin and pulvic acid lactone. These compounds are found at rates of 80% and 20% respectively. In terms of standard chemical spot tests, C. lichenicola is K+ (reddish), KC−, and C−.

Candelariella lichenicola shares many traits with other members of its genus, the vast majority of which are lichens. The unique spore shape of this species, while unusual, is not entirely unique within Candelariella and can be found in a few other species such as C. citrina. Similarly, while the paraphyses (a type of cell in the hymenium) in most Candelariella species are simple or sparingly branched near the apices, in C. lichenicola, most paraphyses are branched in the mid-hymenium.

== Habitat and distribution ==
Candelariella lichenicola appears to exclusively grow on Candelina submexicana, a species of lichen that prefers siliceous rocks found in southwestern North America's interior desert and at high altitudes. This fungus is currently known from three locations in northwestern Mexico. The lichenicolous fungus does not seem to inflict any damage on the host lichen, with no noticeable discolouration or other visible effects on the thallus.

Despite Candelina submexicana being common across southwestern North America, C. lichenicola is not widespread. The fungus is diminutive, easily overlooked, and seems to be a rare species, contributing to its limited observed distribution.
