= Opeltiella fibrosoides =

Scientific classification
- Kingdom: Fungi
- Division: Ascomycota
- Class: Candelariomycetes
- Order: Candelariales
- Family: Candelariaceae
- Genus: Opeltiella
- Species: O. fibrosoides

Binomial name
- Opeltiella fibrosoides (M.Westb. & Frödén) S.Y.Kondr. (2020)

Synonyms
- Candelaria fibrosoides M.Westb. & Frödén (2007)

Species of lichen

Opeltiella fibrosoides is a species of lichen-forming fungus in the family Candelariaceae. It is known to occur only in a single location in Peru, where lichen thrives in a high-altitude environment, specifically on shrubs and cacti in an open pasture land. It was formally described as a new species by Swedish lichenologists Martin Westberg and Patrik Frödén in 2007, first as a member of the genus Candelaria. Although it bears a striking resemblance to C. fibrosa on the surface, it is differentiated by its eight-spored asci and a thallus featuring an ecorticate lower surface. In 2020, Sergey Kondratyuk transferred the taxon to the newly circumscribed genus Opeltiella, following molecular phylogenetic-based analysis of the family Candelariaceae.
