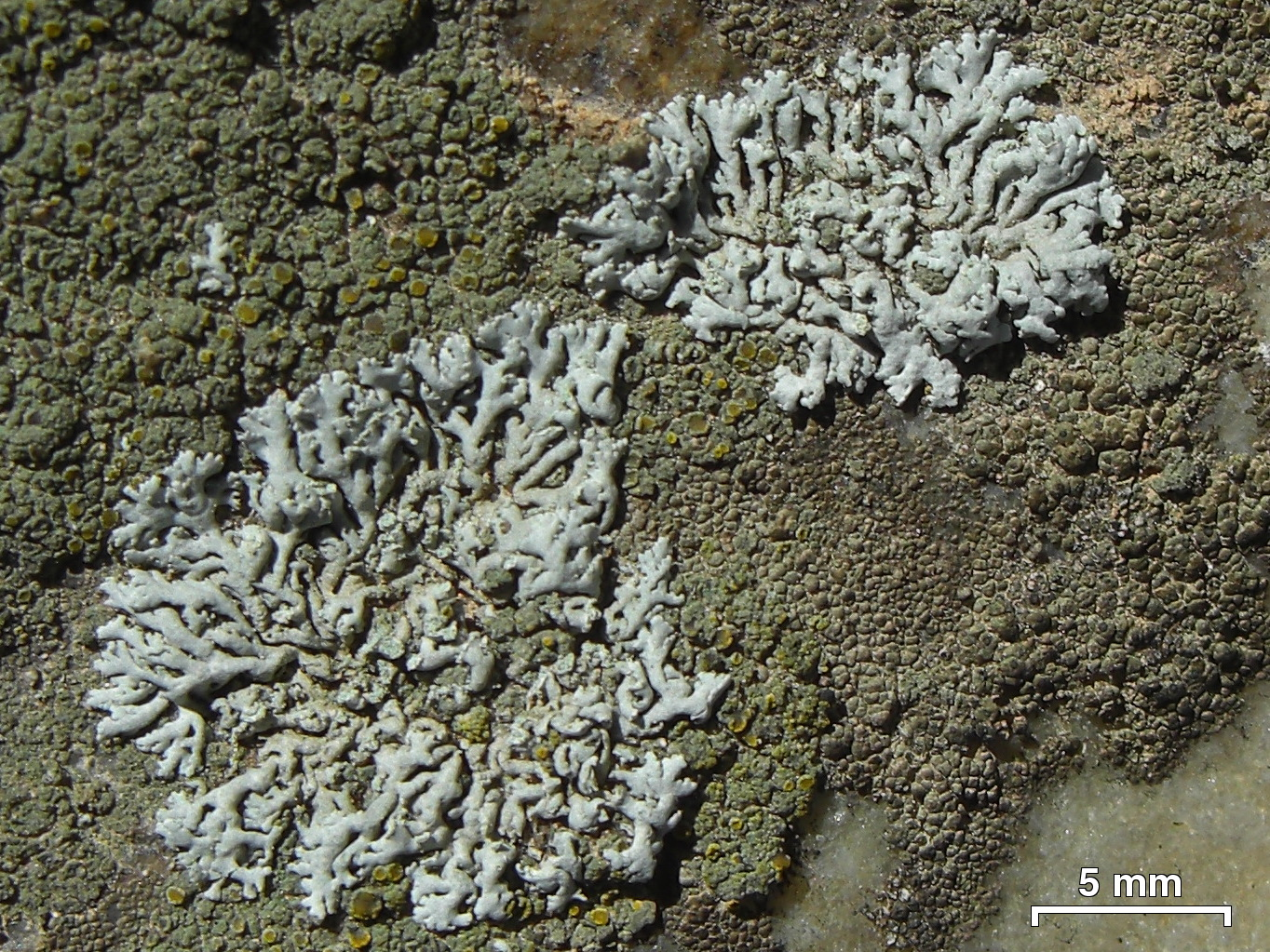
- Physcia dubia (large foliose lichen) alongside Candelariella antennaria (grey/yellow crustose lichen)

Scientific classification
- Domain: Eukaryota
- Kingdom: Fungi
- Division: Ascomycota
- Class: Candelariomycetes
- Order: Candelariales
- Family: Candelariaceae
- Genus: Candelariella
- Species: C. antennaria

Binomial name
- Candelariella antennaria Räsänen (1939)

= Candelariella antennaria =

Species of fungus

Candelariella antennaria, or the pussytoes eggyolk lichen, is a lichen commonly distributed in North America, and has been observed in South America, Asia, Australia, and Europe. It is characterized by its gray thallus and bright yellow apothecia, as well as its very small size.

== Characteristics ==
Candelariella antennaria is a crustose lichen best characterized by its yellow apothecia, which make up the majority of the visible lichen. The apothecial disc is a lemon-yellow or orange-yellow, flat, and not exceeding 1 mm in diameter. The disc may test K negative, or reddish. All other spot tests are negative. The thallus is colored gray and scattered, but not granular. The thallus is composed of non-gelatinized and thin-walled hyphae that do not form stipes. The lichen is small, which makes it hard to spot.

== Habitat ==
Candelariella antennaria is most often found on tree bark of deciduous trees.
