= Candelariella corallizoides =

Scientific classification
- Kingdom: Fungi
- Division: Ascomycota
- Class: Candelariomycetes
- Order: Candelariales
- Family: Candelariaceae
- Genus: Candelariella
- Species: C. corallizoides

Binomial name
- Candelariella corallizoides M.Westb. (2007)

Species of lichen

Candelariella corallizoides is a species of squamulose (scaley), saxicolous (rock-dwelling) lichen in the family Candelariaceae. Found in Mexico, it was formally described as a new species in 2007 by Swedish lichenologist Martin Westberg. The type specimen was collected from the north-facing cliffs of the Sierra Agua Verde (in the Sierra de San Francisco mountain range, Baja California) at an elevation of 1,200 m (3,900 ft). Here, in open oak woodland with shrubs, it was found growing on siliceous rock. The lichen is known to occur in several localities in Baja California. The specific epithet corallizoides refers to the coralloid (resembling coral) squamules of the thallus.
