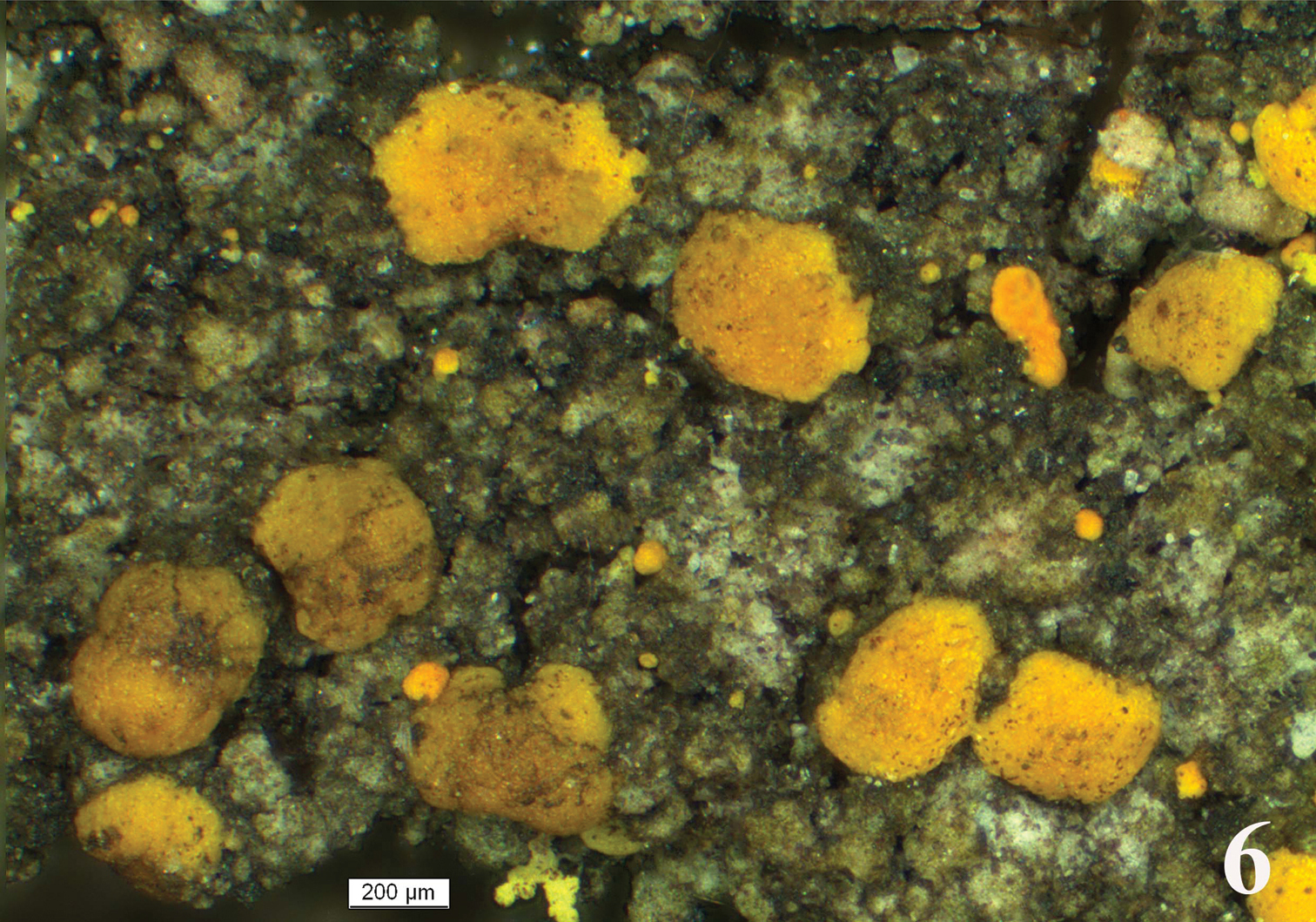
- Protocandelariella subdeflexa

Scientific classification
- Kingdom: Fungi
- Division: Ascomycota
- Class: Candelariomycetes
- Order: Candelariales
- Family: Candelariaceae
- Genus: Protocandelariella; Poelt ex D.Liu, Hur & S.Y.Kondr. (2020)

Type species
- Protocandelariella subdeflexa (Nyl.) Poelt, D.Liu, Hur & S.Y.Kondr. (2020)

Species
- P. blastidiata P. subdeflexa

= Protocandelariella =

Genus of lichens

Protocandelariella is a genus of lichen-forming fungi in the family Candelariaceae. It has two species of squamulose (scaly), corticolous (bark-dwelling) lichens.

== Taxonomy ==
The genus was circumscribed in 2020 by lichenologists D.Liu, Jae-Seoun Hur, and Sergey Kondratyuk, with P. subdeflexa assigned as the type species. This lichen was originally described in 1879 by William Nylander as a member of the genus Lecanora. The genus name alludes to its resemblance to genus Candelariella, from which it differs due to its squamulose thallus and the production of conidia from conidiogenous cells on its lower surface, in contrast to Candelariella which produces conidia from pycnidia on its upper surface.

Poelt, in 1974, identified 'Candelariella' subdeflexa as a unique species within the genus Candelariella. Although he died in 1995, his designation of the name 'protocandelariella' was later adopted for the new genus, confirmed both morphologically and molecularly. Protocandelariella includes P. subdeflexa, identified as the type species by Poelt, and another species named 'Candelariella' blastidiata, which was described later. Both species are closely related, as supported by morphological and molecular phylogenetic data, and are recognized as a species pair as per Poelt's 1970 definition.

An independent internal transcribed spacer-based DNA analysis recovered Candelariella blastidiata and C. subdeflexa as a strongly supported, monophyletic clade basal to the remainder of Candelariaceae; Kondratyuk and colleagues (2020) had applied the name Protocandelariella to this lineage. Subsequent studies show the same placement, indicating consistent support for recognising the clade at the rank of genus.

== Description ==
Protocandelariella is characterized by a thallus that is often squamulose (scaley) in appearance, although it can sometimes be less defined and take on a granular to indistinct texture. The thallus is pale grey to pale brownish grey in colour, has a slight sheen, and is made up of two layers: the upper layer may contain dead, compressed hyphae, while the lower layer has a paraplectenchymatous structure. Some specimens may have blastidia, which are found either along the edges or on the underside of the squamules (small scales).

The lichen's apothecia are biatorine in form and are generally abundant. They have a disc that ranges in colour from pale yellow to a more pronounced yellow and can be slightly to very convex in shape. These apothecia typically house eight-spored asci, and the ascospores themselves are clear (hyaline), varying in shape from narrowly ellipsoid to ovoid. They can be either simple or have a single septum. Protocandelariella does not usually have conidiomata (structures that bear conidia). Instead, the underside of the squamules is often covered with conidiophores, and the conidia they produce are clear and roughly spherical in shape.

From a chemical standpoint, the genus contains substances like calycin, pulvinic acid, pulvinic dilactone, and vulpinic acid. When subjected to a potassium hydroxide chemical spot test (K), the apothecial disc turns reddish, but it remains unreactive to other chemical tests, including C− and KC−.

== Habitat and distribution ==
Protocandelariella species been identified in regions including North America, southern and central Europe, North Africa, Asia, and New Zealand. Typically, they thrive on the bark of broad-leaved trees, though they can occasionally be found on wood.

== Species ==
- Protocandelariella blastidiata (Yakovch.) D.Liu, Hur & S.Y.Kondr. (2020)
- Protocandelariella subdeflexa (Nyl.) Poelt ex D.Liu, Hur & S.Y.Kondr. (2020)
