= Candelariella flavosorediata =

Scientific classification
- Kingdom: Fungi
- Division: Ascomycota
- Class: Candelariomycetes
- Order: Candelariales
- Family: Candelariaceae
- Genus: Candelariella
- Species: C. flavosorediata

Binomial name
- Candelariella flavosorediata Kalb & Aptroot (2021)

Species of lichen

Candelariella flavosorediata is a species of lichen in the family Candelariaceae. Found in Réunion, it was described as a new species in 2021 by lichenologists Klaus Kalb and André Aptroot. The type was collected just below the summit of the Maïdo (a volcanic peak), at an elevation of about 2,100 m (6,900 ft). Here it was found growing on tree bark in scrub. The specific epithet flavosorediata refers to the yellow soredia that cover most of the lichen thallus. As of 2025, it has only been reported from its type locality.

== Description ==
Candelariella flavosorediata presents itself as a scatter of minute, bright-yellow "islands" on the substrate. Each island, or areole, is only about 0.1–0.3 mm across and has an irregular outline and slightly uneven surface. Almost as soon as the thallus develops, it becomes masked by a dusting of equally vivid yellow soredia—powder-fine granules roughly 25 μm in diameter that contain both the fungal filaments and their green algal partner. Because these soredia are so abundant, the underlying thallus is often all but invisible, and there is no darker hypothallus fringe at the margins. The photobiont consists of tiny, spherical green algal cells (5–7 μm across) typical of the chlorococcoid group.

Fruiting bodies (apothecia) are uncommon but diagnostic when present. They sit directly on the surface (sessile) and measure 0.2–0.4 mm in diameter, their slightly darker yellow discs lying flush with a barely raised rim. The asci each contain eight colourless ascospores that are spindle-shaped to rhomboidal with gently rounded ends, usually 18–21 μm long and 5–6 μm wide. No asexual pycnidia have been observed. A simple chemical spot test—adding potassium hydroxide solution—turns both thallus and apothecia a faint red, a reaction that, together with thin-layer chromatography, confirms the presence of pulvinic acid pigments responsible for the lichen's intense yellow hue.

The sorediate Candelariella reflexa is somewhat similar in appearance, but can be distinguished from C. flavosorediata by the smaller size of the granules or areoles comprising the thallus, and by its indistinct soralia and smaller, powdery soredia.
