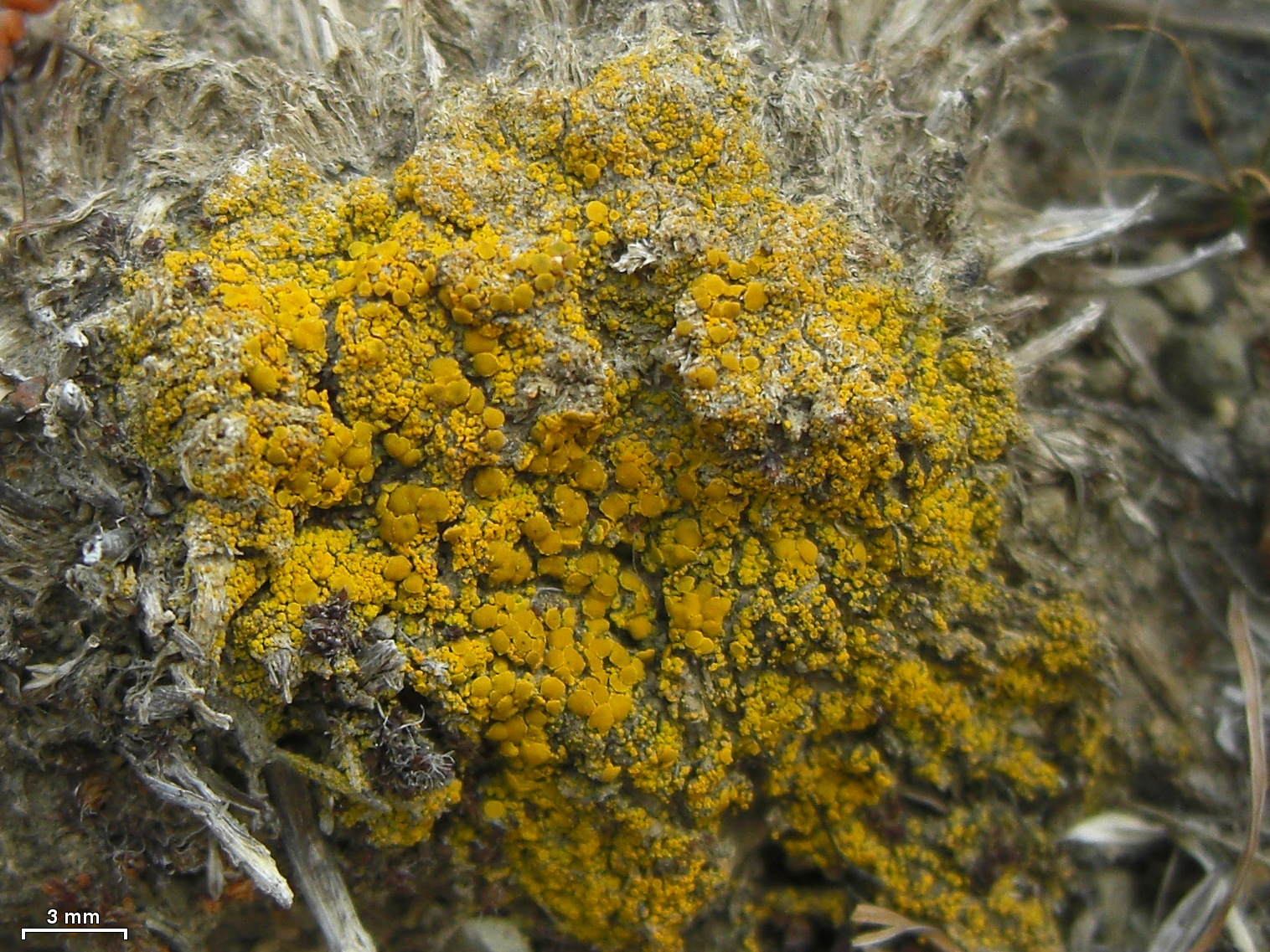

Scientific classification
- Kingdom: Fungi
- Division: Ascomycota
- Class: Candelariomycetes
- Order: Candelariales
- Family: Candelariaceae
- Genus: Candelariella
- Species: C. aggregata

Binomial name
- Candelariella aggregata M.Westb. (2007)

= Candelariella aggregata =

Species of lichen

Candelariella aggregata is a species of lichen in the family Candelariaceae. It is found in western North America, Mongolia, and Switzerland where it grows on mosses and plant debris.

== Taxonomy ==
The lichen was formally described as a new species in 2007 by Swedish lichenologist Martin Westberg. The type specimen was collected northwest of the Tombstone Ridge in Larimer County (Colorado) at an elevation between 3,500 and 3,600 m (11,500 and 11,800 ft).

== Description ==
The lichen has an orange to yellow, granular thallus, with the granules (measuring 0.1–0.35 mm) scattered to crowded, and often obscured by the apothecia. The apothecia are lecanorine, and typically measure 0.3–0.6 mm with a flat to convex disc. The ascospores are usually narrowly ellipsoid, although there is some variability in shape; their dimensions are usually in the range 13.0–19.0 by 4.5–6.0 μm. Secondary chemicals found in Candelariella aggregata include calycin, pulvic acid lactone, vulpinic acid, and rhizocarpic acid. The last compound had not previously been reported to occur in genus Candelariella.

== Habitat and distribution ==
The original range of the species included the Rocky Mountains and the Cascade Range, where it grows above the tree line in alpine tundra on mosses and plant debris, and steppe-like habitats in the Interior Basin at elevations greater than 1,500 m (4,900 ft). Since its original publication, the species has been recorded from Mongolia and Switzerland.

== Ecology ==
Lichenochora arctica is a lichenicolous fungus that has been recorded growing on Candelariella aggregata in Mongolia.
