= Candelariella deppeanae =

Scientific classification
- Kingdom: Fungi
- Division: Ascomycota
- Class: Candelariomycetes
- Order: Candelariales
- Family: Candelariaceae
- Genus: Candelariella
- Species: C. deppeanae

Binomial name
- Candelariella deppeanae M.Westb. (2007)

Species of lichen

Candelariella deppeanae is a species of lichen in the family Candelariaceae. Found in southwestern North America, it was formally described as a new species in 2007 by the Swedish lichenologist Martin Westberg. The type specimen was collected in the Chiricahua Mountains (Chiricahua National Monument, Arizona) at an elevation of 1,750 m (5,740 ft). Here, in an oak forest, it was found growing on a decorticated (barkless) part of alligator juniper (Juniperus deppeana). Most collections of the lichen are from the wood or trunks of this juniper plant; the species epithet deppeanae alludes to this close relationship.

The lichen has a greenish-yellow to yellow, granular to areolate thallus. It has also been collected in Texas, and from Chihuahua, Baja California Norte and Baja California Sur. The lichen grows mainly on wood and decorticated trunks, but has also been less frequently recorded growing on bark. Secondary chemicals that have been detected in Candelariella deppeanae (using high-performance liquid chromatography) include calycin, pulvic acid lactone, vulpinic acid, and pulvinic acid.
