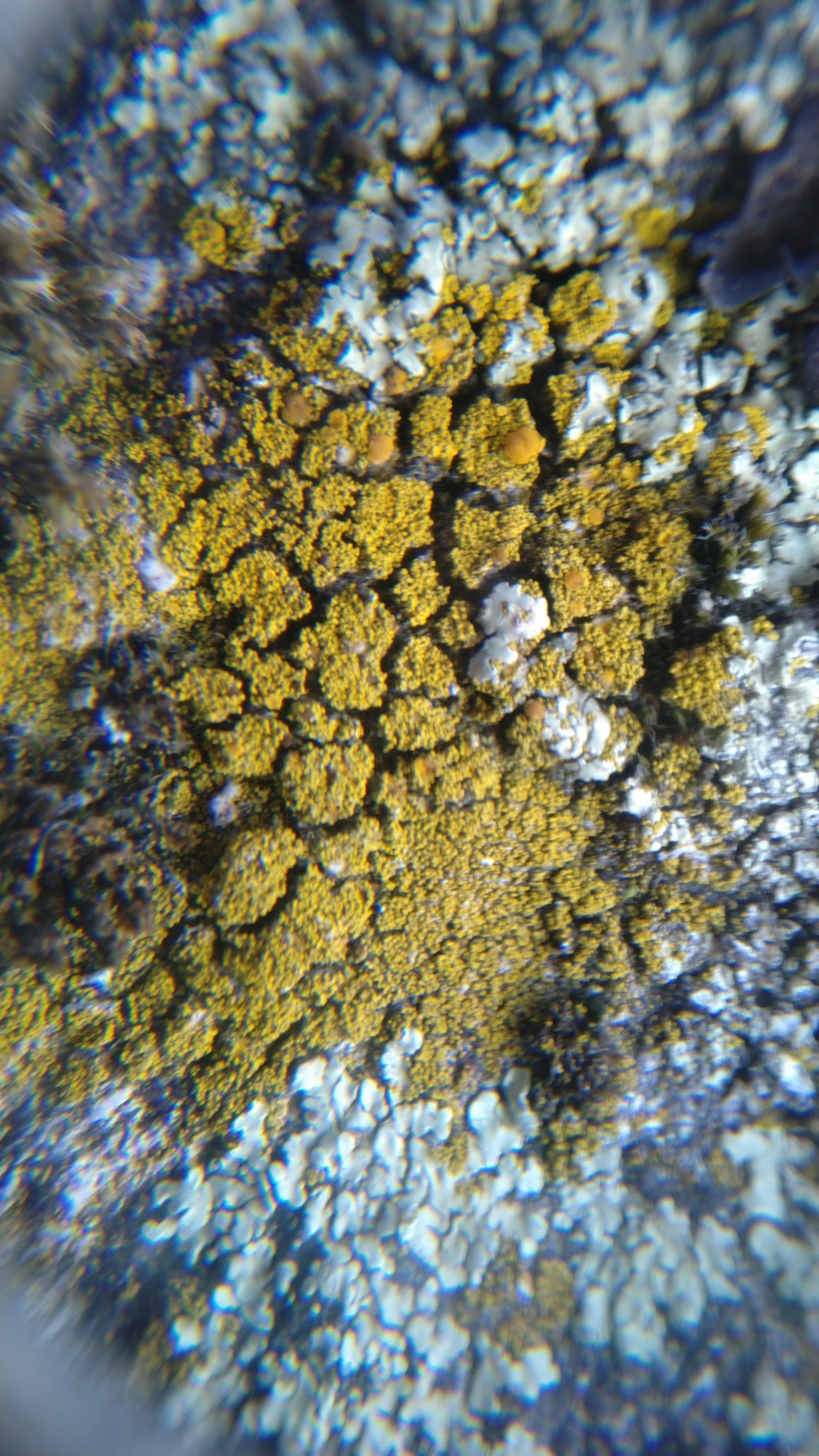

Conservation status
- Apparently Secure (NatureServe)

Scientific classification
- Kingdom: Fungi
- Division: Ascomycota
- Class: Candelariomycetes
- Order: Candelariales
- Family: Candelariaceae
- Genus: Candelariella
- Species: C. coralliza

Binomial name
- Candelariella coralliza (Nyl.) H.Magn. (1935)

Synonyms
- Lecanora coralliza Nyl. (1875) (= basionym)

= Candelariella coralliza =

Species of lichen-forming fungus

Candelariella coralliza is a species of fungus belonging to the family Candelariaceae.

In Nepal, Candelariella coralliza has been reported from 3,800 to 5,000 m elevation in a compilation of published records; this reported range extends above the tree line used in the study.
