= Candelariella clarkiae =

Scientific classification
- Kingdom: Fungi
- Division: Ascomycota
- Class: Candelariomycetes
- Order: Candelariales
- Family: Candelariaceae
- Genus: Candelariella
- Species: C. clarkiae

Binomial name
- Candelariella clarkiae E.Tripp & Lendemer (2015)

Species of lichen

Candelariella clarkiae is a rare species of crustose lichen in the family Candelariaceae. It was discovered in Colorado, USA, and formally described as a new species in 2015 by lichenologists Erin Tripp and James Lendemer. It was originally published with the species epithet clarki, but this was subsequently corrected to clarkiae. The name honors Dina Clark, Collections Manager at the University of Colorado herbarium, for her significant contributions to the knowledge of the Colorado flora, particularly the high plains ecosystems flanking the Southern Rocky Mountains. The authors note of the lichen that "it is bright and sunny, just like Dina’s disposition".

It is a crustose, saxicolous (rock-dwelling) lichen, composed of irregularly shaped areoles with a chartreuse thallus color. It lacks soredia, isidia, or other lichenized diaspores. The apothecia are frequent but often lack mature asci and ascospores. This lichen differs from its closest relative, Candelariella rosulans, in several ways, including its thallus color, apothecia shape, and chemical composition.

Candelariella clarkii is known only from the type locality, where it was found occupying sunbaked, horizontal surfaces of very loose, fragile sandstones of the Fox Hills Formation. According to the authors, Candelariella clarkii merits ranking under the IUCN Red List as Critically Endangered due to its limited geographical range, small number of known extant populations, and the small number of individuals known.
