= Rainar Hakulinen =

Finnish lichenologist (1918–1991)

Rainar Alarik Hakulinen (9 October 1918 – 29 December 1991) was a Finnish lichenologist and schoolteacher. He was noted as an expert on the lichen family Candelariaceae, and was known for his numerous phytogeographical publications about the boreal and arctic lichens of Finland, Northern Norway, and Russian Karelia.

== Biography ==
Hakulinen was born in Kurkijoki on 9 October 1918. At the time, this area was part of Finland, but is now in the Republic of Karelia, a part of Russia. Hakulinen served in the Finnish Army in its war against Russia in 1941–1944, spending a lot of his time there on the frontier at the Svir River. He spent several months in military hospitals to heal his wounds.

In his school years, Hakulinen knew the lichenologist Veli Räsänen, who encouraged his early interest in lichens. Räsäsen had lived in the area for years and had studied its lichen flora quite thoroughly; Hakulinen accompanied him on field trips. Hakulinen maintained his interest after entering the University of Helsinki, and took courses in geography and biology. He received a magister degree in 1948. In 1954, he published his Ph.D. dissertation on the taxonomy of the genus Candelariella, and he established the family Candelariaceae.

After finishing university, Hakulinen worked as a secondary school teacher, first at Isokyrö, but soon later in Hämeenlinna, where he settled permanently. He studied the distribution of lichens in Finland, visiting widely throughout the country, and published floristic compilations and treatments of various lichen groups with distribution maps. In 1963 he published a reference work titled Jäkäläkasvio that compiled all of the Finnish macrolichens, and common names; it gave the distributions of the lichens more accurately than any predecessor works.

Other research interests included the growth rate of lichens, and the ecology of lichens growing on small islands and lakeshores. After his mentor Räsäsen died in 1953, he took over the editorship of the exsiccata series (sets of dried herbarium specimens) Lichenotheca Fennica a Museo Kupoioensi ëdita; Hakulinen added 500 numbers to the 800 already distributed by Räsäsen.

Hakulinen published his last scientific paper in 1968, and essentially ceased lichenological activity after that. His applications for professorship at the Universities of Turku and Oulu were rejected, and he moved on to other interests. He published three books (1972, 1978, 1986) on the history of his home parish Kurkijoki, and two school history books.

In his obituary of Hakulinen, his colleague Teuvo Ahti describes him as "an important link in maintaining continuity between the splendid Finnish tradition of lichenology from William Nylander through E. A. Vainio and V. Rasanen to the present". Hakulinen died at his home on 29 December 1991.

The lichens Candelariella hakulinenii S.Y.Kondr., Lőkös & Hur (2017) and Verrucaria hakulinenii Pykälä & Myllys (2024) are named in his honour.

== Selected publications ==
Hakulinen's 40 lichenological publications are listed in Ahti's obituary. Some of his major works include:

- Hakulinen, Rainar (1965). "Über die Verbreitung und das Vorkommen einiger nördlichen Erd- und Steinflechten in Ostfennoskandien" [About the distribution and occurrence of some northern earth- and stone lichens in eastern Fennoscandia]. Aquilo / Seria Botanica (in German). 3: 22–66.
- Hakulinen, Rainar (1954). "Die Flechtengattung Candelariella Müller Argoviensis mit besonderer Berticksichtigung ihres Auftretens und ihrer Verbreitung in Fennoskandien" [The lichen genus Candelariella Müller Argoviensis with special consideration of its occurrence and its distribution in Fennoscandia]. Annales Botanici Societatis Zoologicae-Botanicae Fennicae Vanamo (in German). 27 (3): I–VI, 1–127.
- Hakulinen, Rainar (1967). "Die Flechtengattung Umbilicaria in Ostfennoskandien und angrenzenden Teilen Norwegens" [The lichen genus Umbilicaria in eastern Fennoscandia and neighbouring parts of Norway]. Annales Botanici Societatis Zoologicae-Botanicae Fennicae Vanamo (in German). 32 (6): l–87.
- Hakulinen, Rainar (1966). "Über einige nördliche Flechtenarten im südöstlichen Fennoskandien" [About some northern lichen species in southeastern Fennoscandia]. Annales Botanici Fennici (in German). 3: 180–198.

== See also ==
- Category:Taxa named by Rainar Hakulinen
