= Phoma candelariellae =

Scientific classification
- Domain: Eukaryota
- Kingdom: Fungi
- Division: Ascomycota
- Class: Dothideomycetes
- Order: Pleosporales
- Family: Didymellaceae
- Genus: Phoma
- Species: P. candelariellae

Binomial name
- Phoma candelariellae Z.Kocakaya & Halıcı (2016)

Species of fungus

Phoma candelariellae is a species of lichenicolous (lichen-eating) fungus in the family Didymellaceae. It is found in the Central Anatolia Region of Turkey and in Ukraine, where it grows parasitically on the apothecia (fruiting structures) of the saxicolous (rock-dwelling) lichen Candelariella aurella.

== Taxonomy ==
The fungus was formally described as a new species in 2016 by Zekiye Kocakaya and Mehmet Gökhan Halıcı. The type specimen was collected northwest of Sivrihisar (Eskişehir) at an altitude of 1,260 m (4,130 ft), where it was found growing on the apothecia of the saxicolous lichen Candelariella aurella, which itself was growing on calcareous rocks.

Phoma candelariellae is the only member of Phoma that grows on lichen genus Candelariella. David Hawksworth and colleagues later expressed doubt about the placement of the taxon in genus Phoma, suggesting that a transfer may be necessary, "as the species does not appear to be congeneric with the type species of the genus".

== Description ==
The conidiomata of Phoma candelariellae are in the form of pycnidia—spherical to pear-shaped reproductive structures, that begin more or less immersed in the host tissue, but later burst partially through the surface. These black spots are covered by a clear gelatinous sheath; their dimensions are typically in the range 98.5−117 by 74−103 μm. A 12 μm-diameter ostiole provides an opening for the release of abundant conidia, which themselves are more or less spherical with a smooth wall and a gelatinous sheath, contain a single internal oil droplet, and measure about 5 μm across.

== Habitat and distribution ==
The only known host of Phoma candelariellae is Candelariella aurella. Infection by the fungus is pathogenic, causing discolouration (blackening) of the host tissue, and diminishing and ultimately destroying the hymenium of the infected apothecia.

At the time of its original publication, Phoma candelariellae had been documented from only two localities in the Central Anatolia Region of Turkey. The authors suggested that the fungus likely has a wider distribution, as the host is widely distributed in the Northern Hemisphere. This was confirmed when it was reported from the Zhytomyr, Kherson, and Mykolaiv regions of Ukraine.
