= Candelinella =

Scientific classification
- Kingdom: Fungi
- Division: Ascomycota
- Class: Candelariomycetes
- Order: Candelariales
- Family: Candelariaceae
- Genus: Candelinella; S.Y.Kondr. (2020)

Type species
- Candelinella makarevichiae (S.Y.Kondr., Lőkös & Hur) S.Y.Kondr. (2020)

Species
- C. deppeanae C. makarevichiae

Genus of lichens

Candelinella is a genus of lichen-forming fungi in the family Candelariaceae. It contains two species of crustose lichens. It is visually similar to the genus Candelina but has unique features, including a distinct thallus and unique spore structures. It was established by Sergey Kondratyuk in 2020, with Candelinella makarevichiae assigned as the type species. The genus is distinguished by the small, crustose thallus that ranges from a granular to areolate or squamulose texture, and the simple to 1-septate, narrowly ellipsoid to oblong ascospores. Its lack of a lower cortex and medulla further sets it apart from Candelina.

== Taxonomy ==
The genus Candelinella was circumscribed by Ukrainian lichenologist Sergey Kondratyuk in 2020, with Candelinella makarevichiae assigned as the type species. Its name reflects its similarities to the genus Candelina, based on combined multigene and nuclear ribosomal DNA internal transcribed spacer (nrITS) phylogenies. It shares a sister position with Candelina in the phylogenetic tree; however, it distinguishes itself with a loosely attached, areolate to squamulose thallus and ascospores that are simple to 1-septate, and narrowly ellipsoid to oblong. Additionally, Candelinella lacks a lower cortex and medulla. Candelinella makarevichiae was initially described from samples collected from the bark of both deciduous and coniferous trees.

Candelinella is morphologically similar to Candelina but has certain distinguishing features including a distinct thallus and unique ascospore structure. A significant finding in the taxonomic history of Candelinella was the determination that Candelariella subsquamulosa, described from South Korea by Dong Liu and Jae-Seoun Hur, is a new synonym for C. makarevichiae, based on nrITS phylogeny and identical sequences of the holotype and isotype specimens.

An independent analysis published in 2025 found that currently available data do not robustly support recognising Candelinella as a separate genus: an ITS-based family-level phylogeny failed to recover support for Candelinella, and the authors argue that further generic changes in the family Candelariaceae are premature until multilocus evidence and congruent anatomical characters are available. Candelariella remains paraphyletic in current trees, and deeper relationships among Candelaria, Candelariella, Candelina and Placomaronea are largely unresolved.

== Description ==
Candelinella is recognised by its small, crustose thallus that varies from granular to areolate or squamulose. The thallus, which ranges from green yellow to orange yellow, is typically convex, rounded to angular or irregular in outline, and sometimes aggregated into thicker crusts. Its apothecia are lecanorine and darker yellow than the thallus, usually becoming strongly convex. The ascospores of this genus are hyaline, simple to 1-septate, and narrowly ellipsoid to oblong. Several lichen products are found in the genus, including calicin, pulvinic acid, pulvinic dilactone, and vulpinic acid.

== Habitat and distribution ==
The genus Candelinella includes two identified species: Candelinella makarevichiae from East Asia and C. deppeanae from south-western North America. The latter, however, may belong to a different genus due to a relatively low level of support for the Candelinella subclade. These lichens are found on the bark or decorticated trunks of both coniferous (Juniperus deppeana and Pinus spp.) and deciduous trees (such as oak and cherry) and shrubs, in diverse ecosystems ranging from desert scrub and riparian woodland to pine forests, up to 2,100 m (6,900 ft) above sea level.
