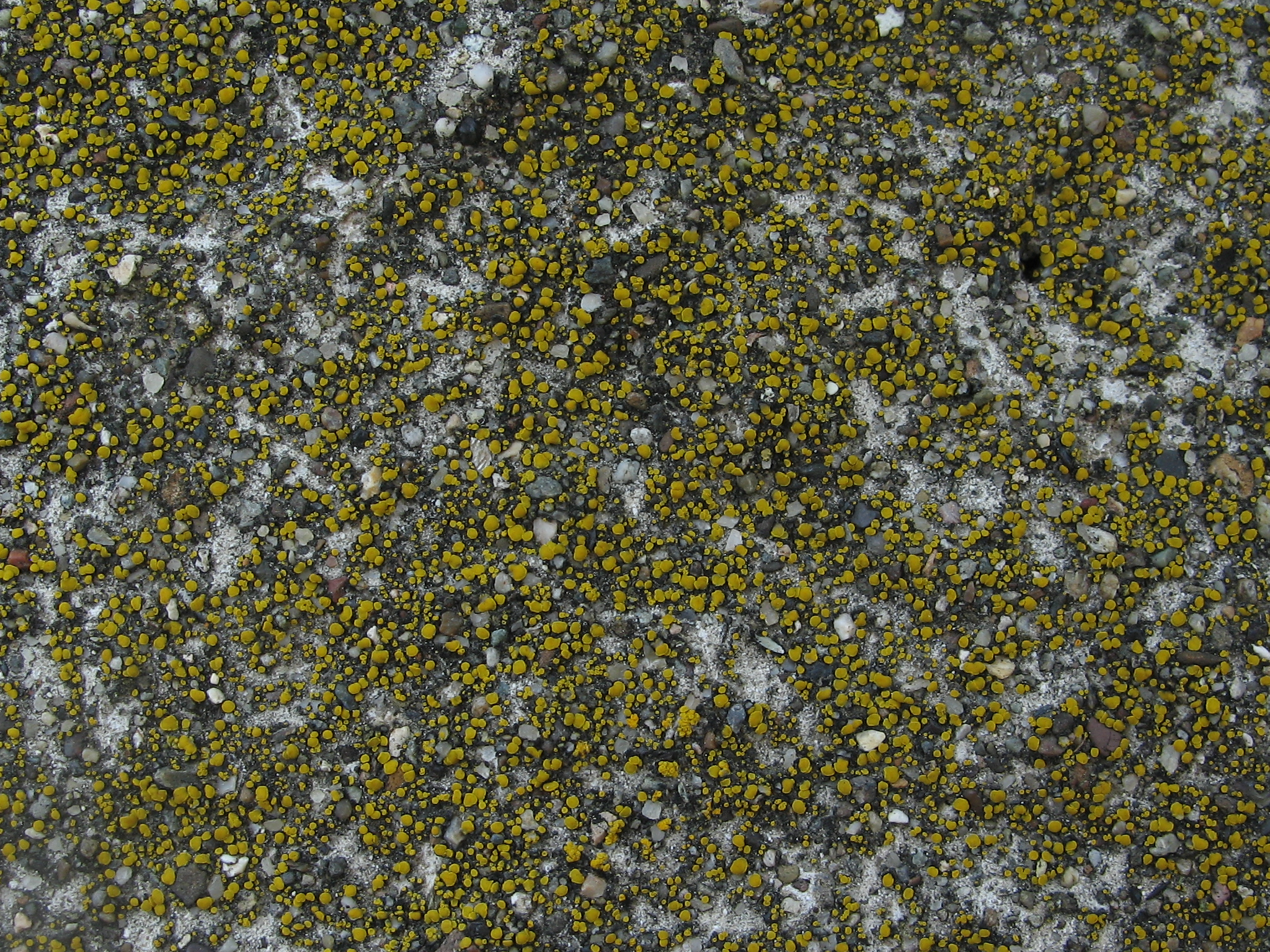
- On old bridge north of Solano Park Circle, Davis, California, USA

Conservation status
- Secure (NatureServe)

Scientific classification
- Kingdom: Fungi
- Division: Ascomycota
- Class: Candelariomycetes
- Order: Candelariales
- Family: Candelariaceae
- Genus: Candelariella
- Species: C. aurella

Binomial name
- Candelariella aurella (Hoffm.) Zahlbr. (1928)

Synonyms
- Verrucaria aurella Hoffm. (1796)

= Candelariella aurella =

Species of lichen-forming fungus

Candelariella aurella, the hidden goldspeck lichen or eggyolk lichen, is a yellow crustose lichen in the family Candelariaceae. It is commonly found on calcareous rock or wood or bark exposed to sunlight and which may have calcareous dust in areas with lime soils. The thallus is areolate with scattered small (0.1–0.3 mm), rounded to elongated yellow areolas. It has a global distribution and occurs on limestone and calcareous sandstone in the Sonoran Desert in Arizona, California, and Baja California. It occurs in Joshua Tree National Monument. In Nepal, Candelariella aurella has been reported from 1,600 to 3,500 m elevation in a compilation of published records.

Phoma candelariellae is a species of lichenicolous (lichen-eating) fungus that has been documented parasitising the apothecia of Candelariella aurella individuals in Europe. Infection by the fungus results in reduced ascospore production, and eventual destruction of the hymenium of the affected apothecia.
