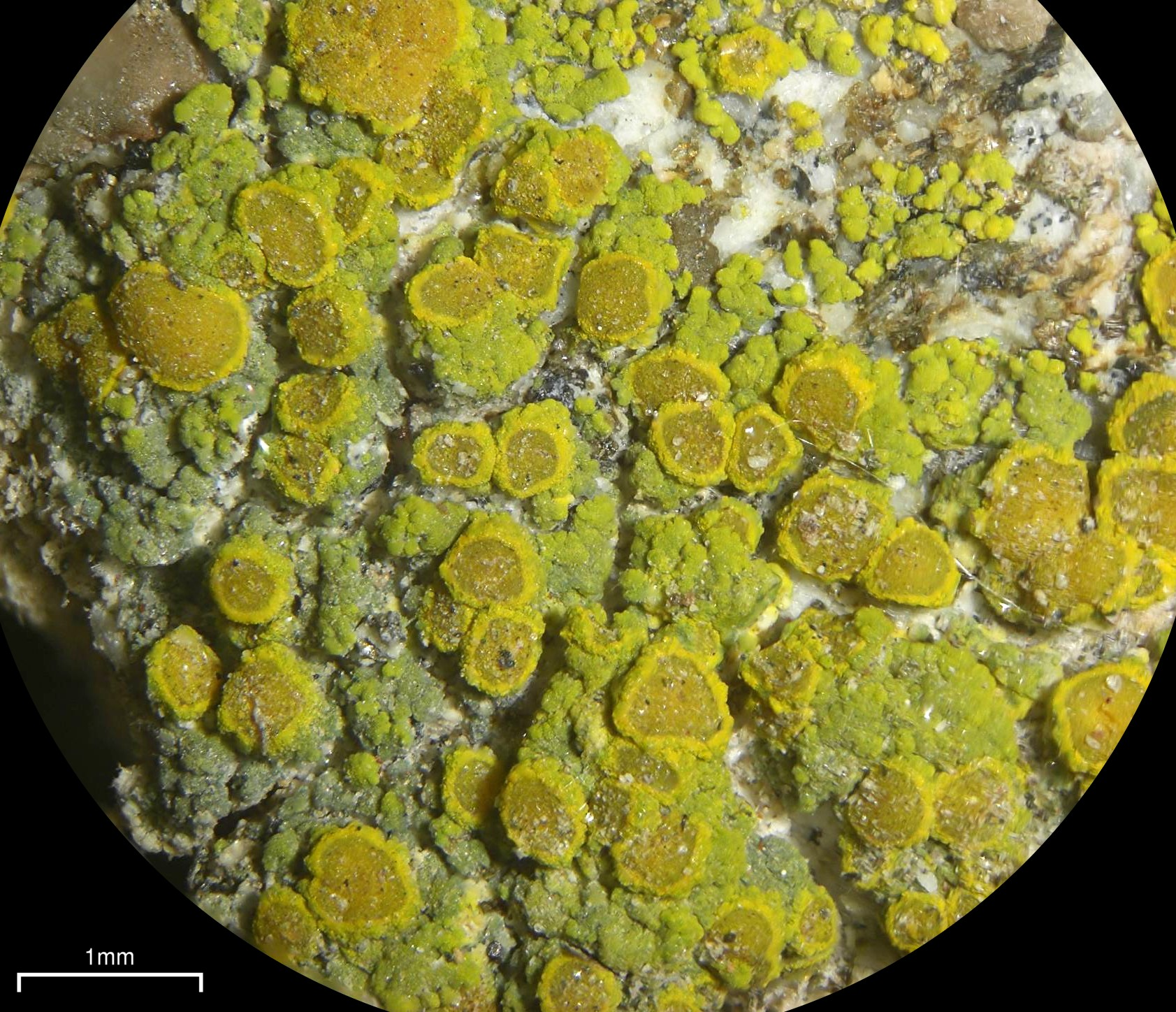
- Candelariella vitellina on granite, magnification 30x

Conservation status
- Secure (NatureServe)

Scientific classification
- Kingdom: Fungi
- Division: Ascomycota
- Class: Candelariomycetes
- Order: Candelariales
- Family: Candelariaceae
- Genus: Candelariella
- Species: C. vitellina

Binomial name
- Candelariella vitellina (Ehrh.) Müll.Arg. (1894)

Synonyms
- Lichen vitellinus Ehrh. (1785); Patellaria vitellina Hoffm. (1794)

= Candelariella vitellina =

Species of lichen

Candelariella vitellina is a common and widespread green-yellow to orange-yellow crustose areolate lichen that grows on rock, wood, and bark, all over the world. It grows on non-calcareous rock, wood, and bark.

== Taxonomy ==
The taxon Candelariella vitellina var. mendozae, proposed by Finnish lichenologist Veli Räsänen in 1941, was promoted to distinct species status, Placomaronea mendozae, in 2004.

== Description ==
Candelariella vitellina often has tiny lobate areoles in the shape of lion claws. The areoles may be flat or convex. Its sexual reproductive structures (apothecia) are a 0.35–1.0 mm-wide disc, darker yellow than the thallus, rimmed with thallus-like tissue (lecanorine), flat but becoming convex with age. The results of lichen spot tests are K+ reddish, KC−, and C−. It produces calycin, pulvinic acid, pulvinic dilactone and vulpinic acid as secondary metabolites.

Candelariella vitellina looks like a miniature version of C. rosulans. It can be distinguished by C. vitanela having a visible exciple (the rim around the apothecia disc), which C. rosulans does not have. It is usually much larger and thicker than the similar C. lutella.

== Habitat and distribution ==
In California, it prefers growing on granite, but can also be found on wood (rarely on bark) and other kinds of rock.

== Species interactions ==
It is a known host to the lichenicolous fungus species Carbonea vitellinaria.
