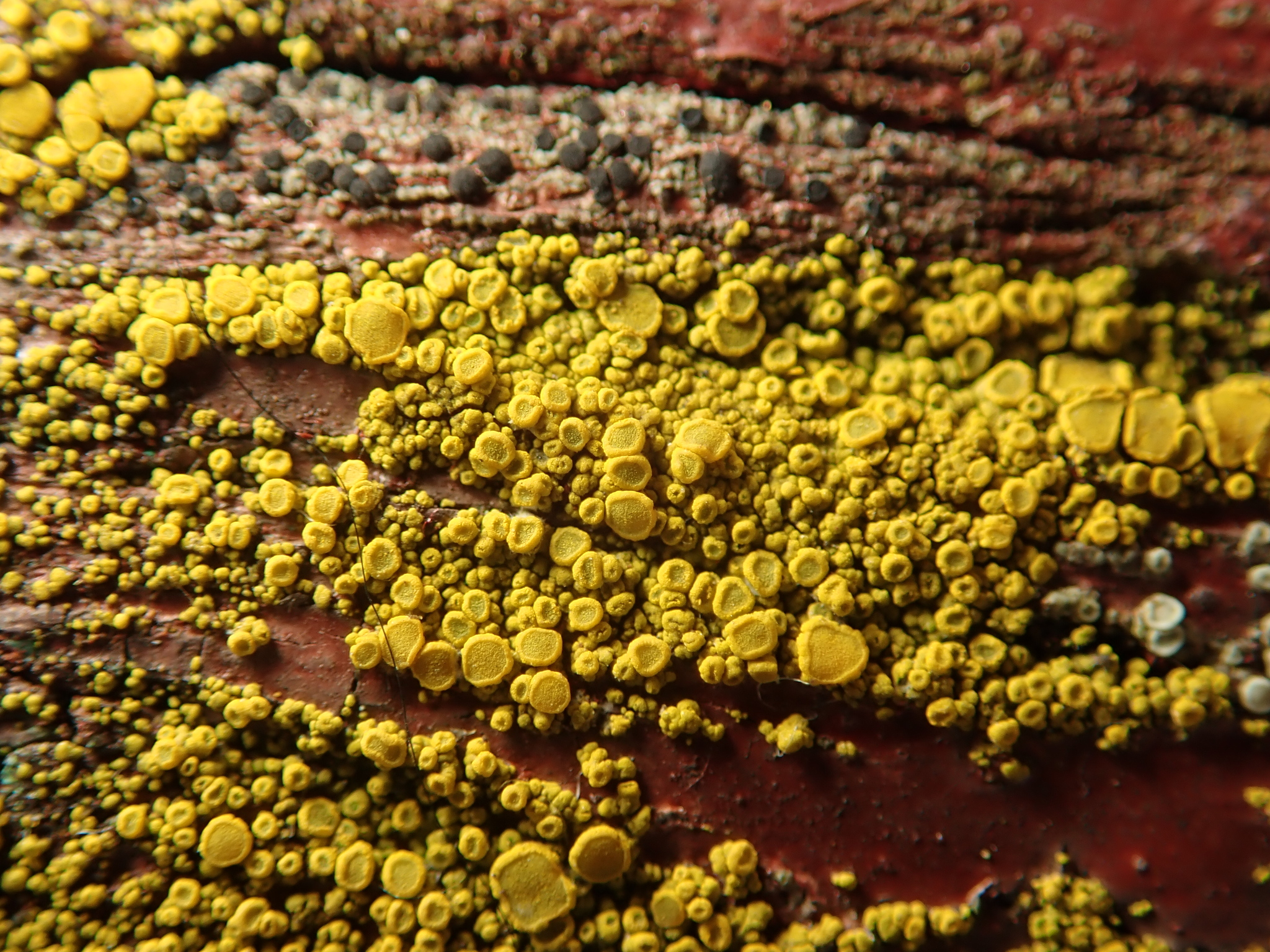
- Candelariella vitellina

Scientific classification
- Kingdom: Fungi
- Division: Ascomycota
- Class: Candelariomycetes
- Order: Candelariales
- Family: Candelariaceae
- Genus: Candelariella; Müll.Arg. (1894)

Type species
- Candelariella vitellina (Ehrh.) Müll.Arg. (1894)

Species
- See text

= Candelariella =

Genus of lichens

Candelariella is a genus of bright yellow, ocher, or greenish yellow crustose or squamulose lichens in the family Candelariaceae. Members of the genus are commonly called eggyolk lichens, goldspeck lichens, or yolk lichens.

== Taxonomy ==
The genus was circumscribed in 1894 by Swiss lichenologist Johannes Müller Argoviensis, with Candelariella vitellina assigned as the type species.

In recent years, taxonomic research (aided by molecular data) has led to a surge in newly described Candelariella species. Since the 2000s, over a dozen species have been added to the genus, reflecting renewed interest and improved methods in lichen systematics. For instance, C. blastidiata (2017) and C. flavosorediata (2021) were discovered in Asia and Africa, respectively, followed by C. ruzgarii from Antarctica (2023) and C. ahtii from Asia (2024). This flurry of recent additions brings the total number of Candelariella species to around 40 as of 2025.

The 2025 analysis also resolved some nomenclature issues. It merged Candelariella makarevichiae (described 2018 from Korea) and C. subsquamulosa (2019, S. Korea) into synonymy with C. xanthostigmoides, since genetic data showed they belong to the same species. Several other sorediate species remain poorly known – for example, C. sorediosa (from the Himalayas), C. flavosorediata (Réunion), and C. magellanica (southern South America) – and lack molecular data. Ongoing research is needed to determine how these relate to the core Candelariella lineage.

== Characteristics ==
The key feature of Candelariella species are the distinct yellow apothecia. Although all species are very small, even the smallest can be identified by the lemon-yellow to orange-yellow discs. Most species have a yellow thallus, although Candelariella antennaria is one example with a grey thallus. Some species are pycnidiate. This genus will generally have all spot tests emerge as negative, although K tests may have an orange or reddish colour on some species' apothecia.

Spore count between species varies from 8 to 32 simply or thinly septate spores. Spores often hold one to two oil drops.

== Habitat and distribution ==
Candelariella species are found across the globe, although most commonly described in North America, Asia, and Australia. Species can be found on calcareous and non-calcareous rock, soil, tree bark, mosses, and other lichens. While some species may grow only on rock, and others only on trees, the more generalist species can be found in a variety of locations.

== Species interactions ==
As of 2016, 16 lichenicolous fungi have been documented parasitising species of the genus Candellariella. These are: Tremella candelariellae, Polysporina subfuscescens, Sarcogyne sphaeospora, Arthonia almquistii, Caloplaca grimmiae, Carbonea vitellinaria, Trichonectria furcatosetosa, Lichenochora arctica, Sarcopyrenia cylindrospora, Zwackhiomyces lecanorae, Phoma candelariellae, Henfellra muriformis, Ascochyta candelariellicola, Taeniolella delicata, Intralichen christiansenii, and Intralichen lichenicola.

== Species ==
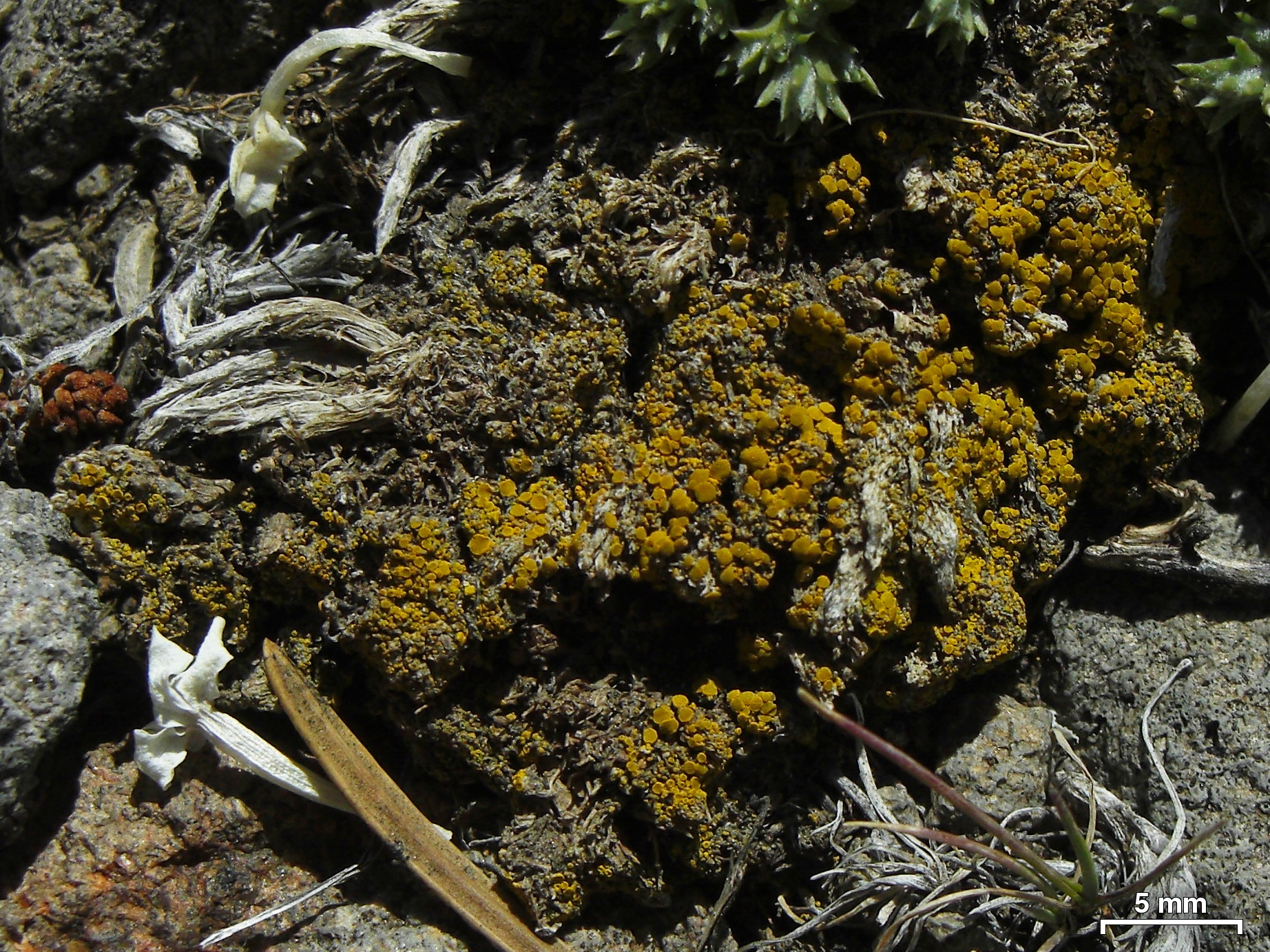
Candelariella aggregata

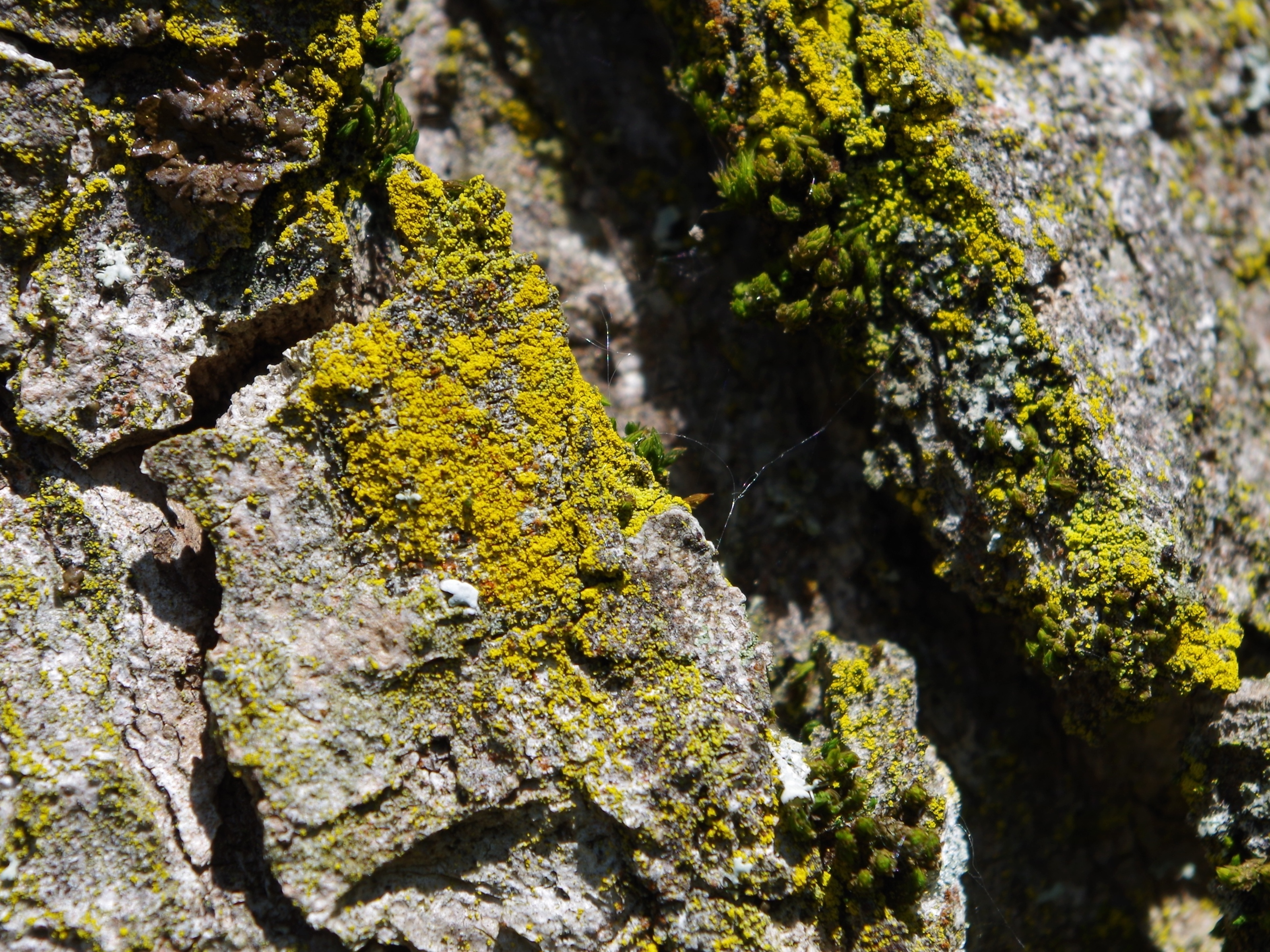
Candelariella xanthostigma

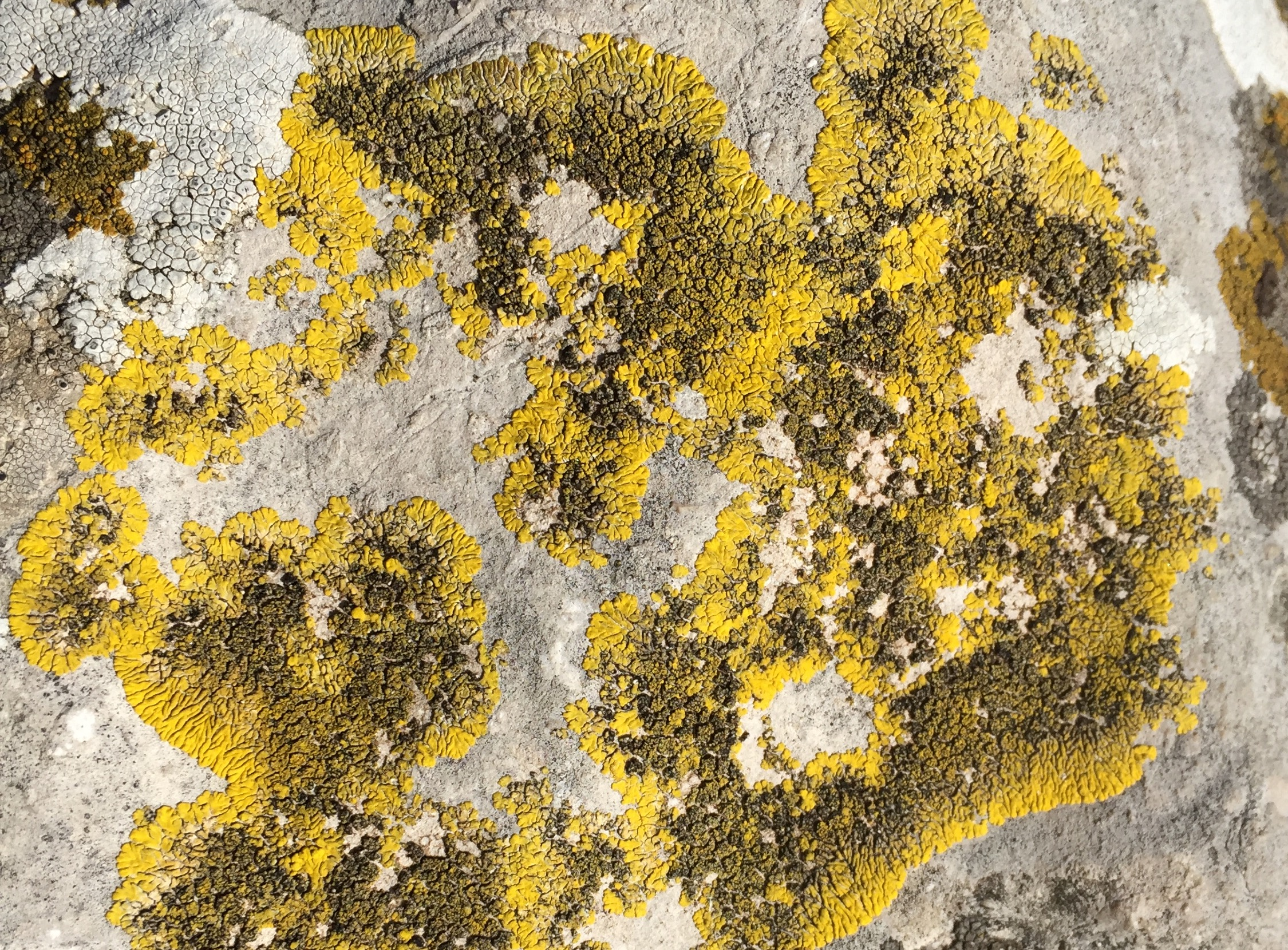
Candelariella medians

- Candelariella aggregata M.Westb. (2007)
- Candelariella ahtii Yakovchenko (2024)
- Candelariella antennaria Räsänen (1939)
- Candelariella arctica (Körb.) R.Sant. (1966)
- Candelariella aurella (Hoffm.) Zahlbr. (1928)
- Candelariella australiensis P.M.McCarthy & Elix (2017) – Australia
- Candelariella biatorina M.Westb. (2007)
- Candelariella blastidiata Yakovch. (2017)
- Candelariella boikoi Khodos. & S.Y.Kondr. (2004)
- Candelariella boleana Etayo, Palice & T.Sprib. (2009) – Europe
- Candelariella borealis M.Westb. (2007) – North America
- Candelariella californica M.Westb. (2007)
- Candelariella clarkiae E.Tripp & Lendemer (2015)
- Candelariella commutata Otte & M.Westb. (2013)
- Candelariella complanata M.Westb. (2007)
- Candelariella coralliza (Nyl.) H.Magn. (1935)
- Candelariella corallizoides M.Westb. (2007)
- Candelariella corviniscalensis C.A.Morse & M.Westb. (2011)
- Candelariella deppeanae M.Westb. (2007)
- Candelariella efflorescens R.C.Harris & W.R.Buck (1978)
- Candelariella flavosorediata Kalb & Aptroot (2021) – Réunion
- Candelariella flavovirella (Nyl.) Lettau (1912)
- Candelariella granuliformis M.Westb. (2011)
- Candelariella hakulinenii S.Y.Kondr., Lőkös & Hur (2017)
- Candelariella immarginata M.Westb. (2007)
- Candelariella lichenicola M.Westb. (2007)
- Candelariella magellanica Etayo (2021) – Chile
- Candelariella medians (Nyl.) A.L.Sm. (1918)
- Candelariella plumbea Poelt & Vězda (1976) – Europe
- Candelariella pulchella van der Kolk, Westb. & Malíček (2025) – Europe (widespread; also possibly North America)
- Candelariella reflexa (Nyl.) Lettau (1912)
- Candelariella rhodax Poelt & Vězda (1976) – Europe
- Candelariella rosulans (Müll.Arg.) Zahlbr. (1928)
- Candelariella rubrisoli D.Liu & Hur (2019)
- Candelariella ruzgarii Halıcı, A.M.Kahraman & Güllü (2022)
- Candelariella superdistans (Nyl.) Malme (1911)
- Candelariella vainioana Hakul. (1954)
- Candelariella vitellina (Hoffm.) Müll.Arg. (1894)
- Candelariella xanthostigma (Pers. ex Ach.) Lettau (1912)
- Candelariella xanthostigmoides (Müll.Arg.) R.W.Rogers (1982)
