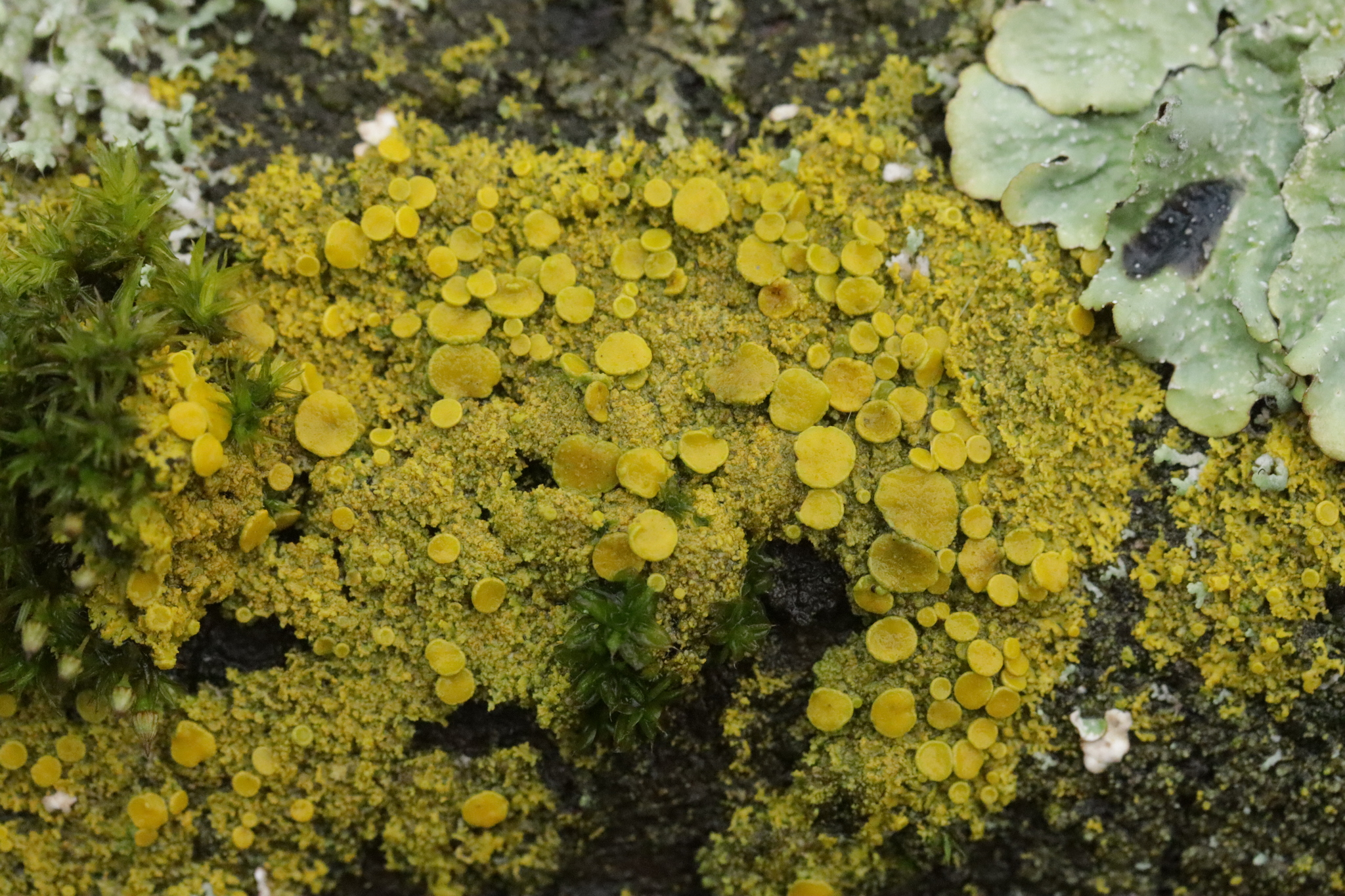
- Candelaria concolor is the type species of the type genus of the Candelariaceae.

Scientific classification
- Kingdom: Fungi
- Division: Ascomycota
- Class: Candelariomycetes
- Order: Candelariales
- Family: Candelariaceae; Hakul. (1954)

Type genus
- Candelaria A.Massal. (1852)

Genera
- Candelaria; Candelariella; Candelina; Candelinella; Opeltiella; Placomaronea; Protocandelariella

= Candelariaceae =

Family of lichens

Candelariaceae is a family of lichen-forming fungi in the order Candelariales. It contains seven genera and about 73 species of lichens that are typically characterised by their bright yellow colour. These lichens have diverse growth forms, including crusty, scaly, and small leaf-like structures, and are found worldwide, particularly in arid and mountainous regions of both hemispheres. The family includes well-known genera such as Candelaria, Candelariella, and Placomaronea, with their classification continuing to evolve based on molecular studies. Recent phylogenies find Candelina and Placomaronea to be well supported, but many relationships among Candelaria and Candelariella lineages remain unresolved.

== Taxonomy ==
The Finnish lichenologist Rainar Hakulinen proposed Candelariaceae in 1954 when he removed the bright-yellow foliose genus Candelaria from Parmeliaceae and united it with the crustose Candelariella and the umbilicate Placomaronea. Candelaria had formerly been placed in the Parmeliaceae by Alexander Zahlbruckner in 1926, while the crustose lichen genus Candelariella was classified among the crustose Lecanoraceae. The family remained morphologically delimited until Josef Poelt (1974) showed that cortex anatomy separated the placodioid Candelina—which has a densely pigmented outer cortex—from Placomaronea, where the cortex is paraplectenchymatous and capped by "peppered" pigment hoods. Early molecular work (Westberg et al. 2007) confirmed the monophyly of the family within Candelariales and recovered well-supported clades corresponding to Candelina and Placomaronea, but also revealed that Candelariella in its traditional sense is paraphyletic.

Subsequent phylogenies that sampled a wider array of internal transcribed spacer (ITS) sequences reiterated these patterns and showed that the ability to produce more than eight ascospores per ascus (polyspory) has evolved repeatedly inside the family. In an effort to impose monophyly, in 2020 Sergey Kondratyuk and colleagues erected three additional genera—Candelinella, Opeltiella and Protocandelariella—to house small but distinct ITS lineages, chiefly the grey-thalline Candelariella subdeflexa group. Because their multilocus backbone had weak support and relied on sparsely sampled loci, those proposals have been treated as provisional in some recent catalogues.

The most comprehensive analysis to date, an ITS-only dataset of 303 accessions that included two newly described Placomaronea species, again retrieved robust clades for Candelina and Placomaronea and confirmed the basal position of the Protocandelariella lineage, but failed to give meaningful support to Candelinella or Opeltiella, and left relationships among the various Candelariella and Candelaria lineages in an unresolved polytomy. The authors therefore recommended a conservative taxonomy that recognises five well-supported genera—Candelaria, Candelariella sensu lato (in the broad sense), Candelina, Placomaronea and the anatomically distinctive Protocandelariella—while awaiting multilocus data that might justify further segregation. Under this pragmatic circumscription the family comprises roughly 80 accepted species distributed worldwide, especially in arid and montane regions of the Northern and Southern hemispheres.

== Description ==
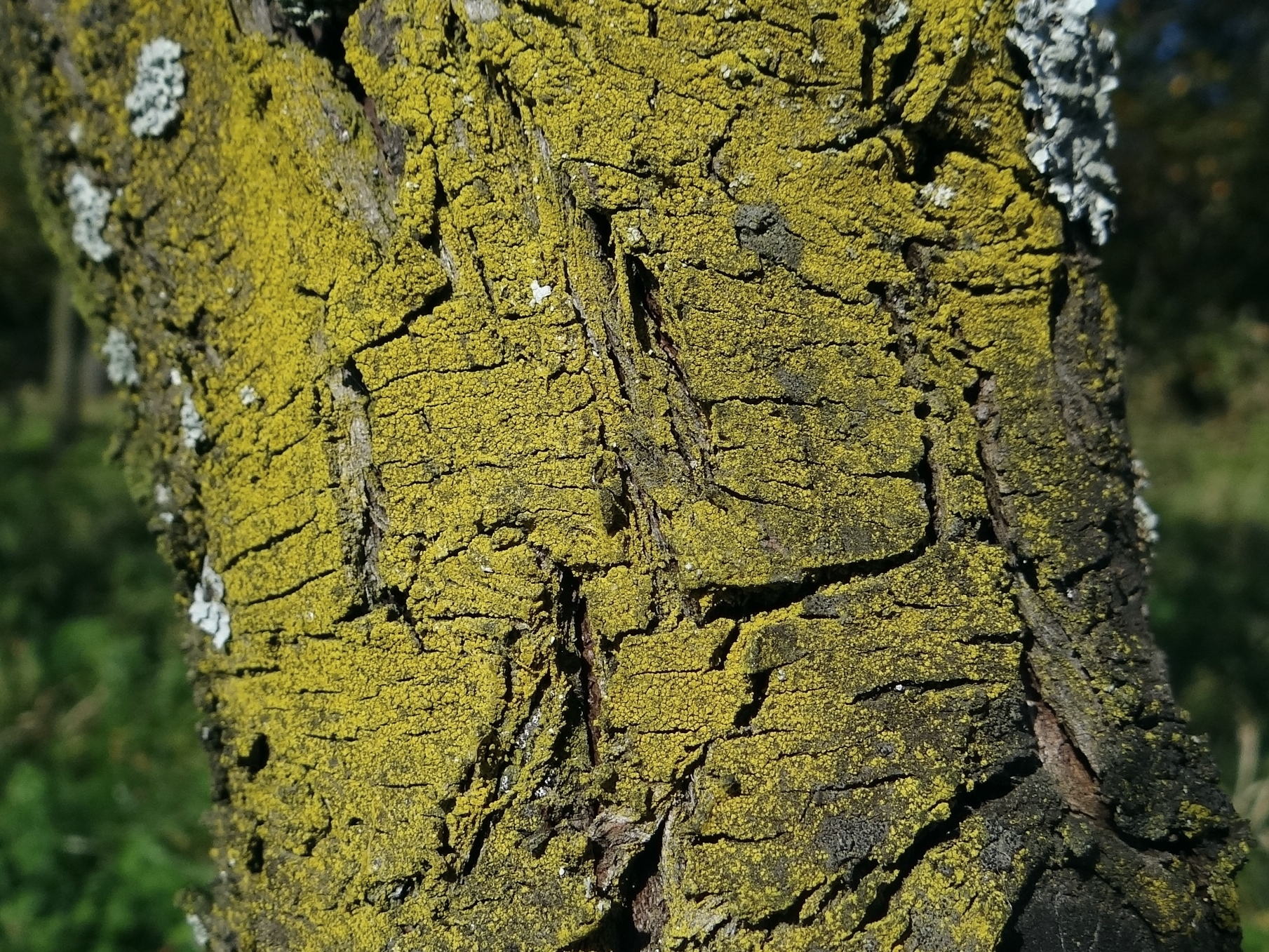
Candelariella xanthostigma

The Candelariaceae exhibits a diverse range of growth forms, including crustose, squamulose, peltate-subumbilicate, and microfoliose thalli, typically characterized by their bright yellow colour. The photobiont in these lichens is chlorococcoid, contributing to their photosynthetic abilities. The reproductive structures, or ascomata, are predominantly lecanorine apothecia, although biatorine apothecia are also found in some instances.

The hamathecium, which is part of the ascomata, is made up of unbranched or slightly branched, amyloid paraphyses. The asci, or spore-bearing structures, have an apical tholus with an amyloid outer wall. The tholus is weakly amyloid, except for the darker, strongly amyloid lower portion, and is typically clavate in shape. Each ascus contains 8 to 64 ascospores, which are either non-septate or indistinctly 1-septate. These spores are hyaline, non-amyloid, and vary in shape from ellipsoid to citriform (lemon-shaped).

Candelariaceae lichens also produce conidiomata, which are pycnidia-containing structures. The conidia, or asexual spores, are non-septate, hyaline, and range in shape from ellipsoid to bacillar (rod shaped), sometimes exhibiting a curved form. The secondary chemistry of Candelariaceae lichens includes derivatives of pulmonic acid, a lichen product that contributes to their unique characteristics.

=== Field and microscope identification ===
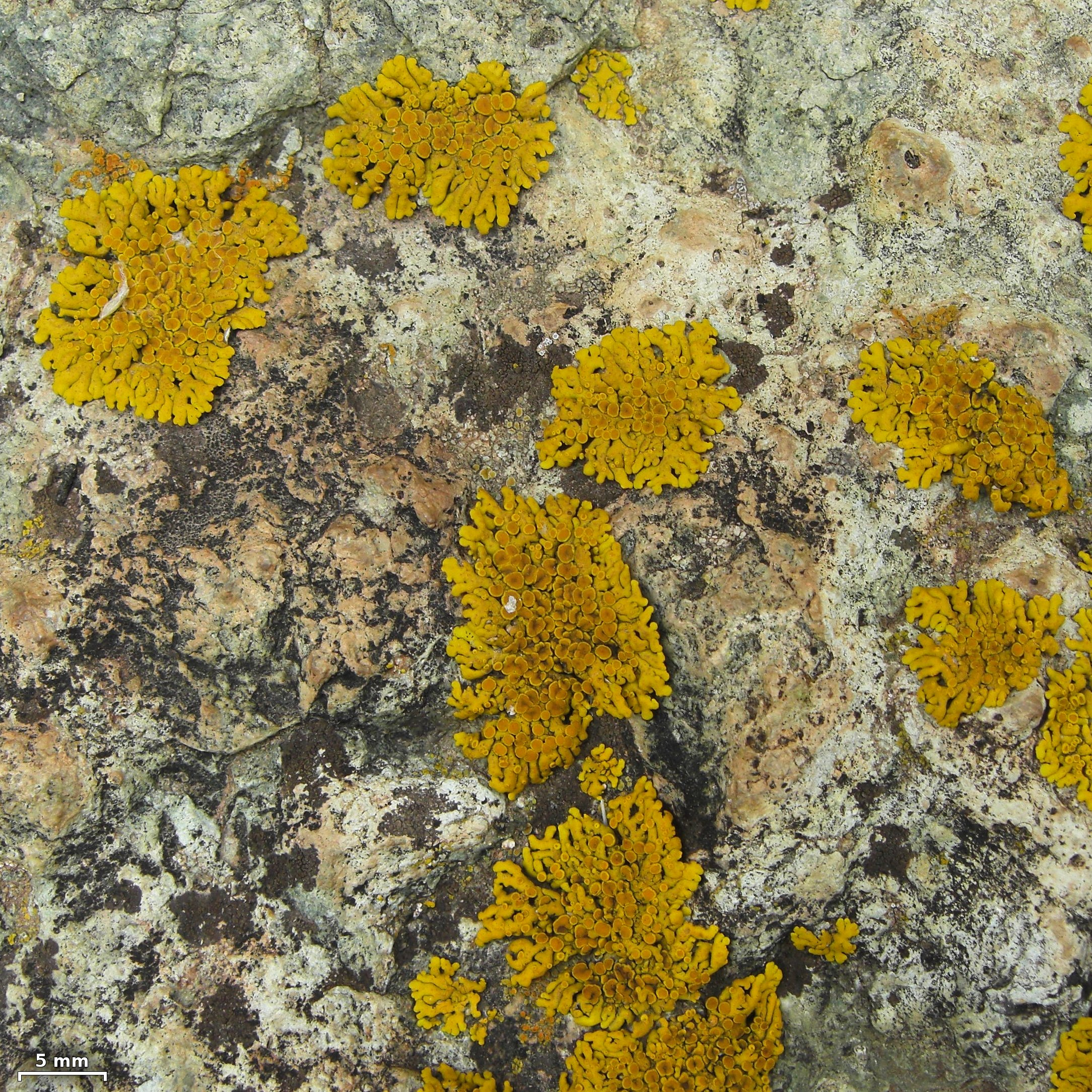
A rock-dwelling Placomarea lichen in Peru

Placodioid Placomaronea and Candelina are easily confused in the field; sections of the upper cortex resolve them: Placomaronea shows a thick paraplectenchymatous cortex with hooded apical cells "peppered" in pigment and a thin hyaline coating that flakes, whereas Candelina has a thinner cortex capped by a dense, cemented pigment layer and lacks any hyaline coating. Candelariella typically has a thinner, looser pigment layer and a mostly prosoplectenchymatous cortex; C. kansuensis is an outlier with a Placomaronea-like hooded cortex plus a very thick hyaline coating.

== Genera ==
Many authors provisionally recognise five core genera (Candelaria, Candelariella (in the loose sense), Candelina, Placomaronea, Protocandelariella) based on well-supported clades; Candelinella and Opeltiella have been proposed but remain weakly supported in ITS-only backbones and are treated conservatively by some workers pending more evidence with multiple genetic loci.

- Candelaria A.Massal. (1852) – 7 spp.
- Candelariella Müll.Arg. (1894) – ca. 50 spp.
- Candelina Poelt (1974) – 3 spp.
- Candelinella S.Y.Kondr. (2020) – 2 spp.
- Opeltiella S.Y.Kondr. (2020) – 4 spp.
- Placomaronea Räsänen (1944) – 6 spp.
- Protocandelariella Poelt, D.Liu, Hur & S.Y.Kondr. (2020) – 2 spp.
