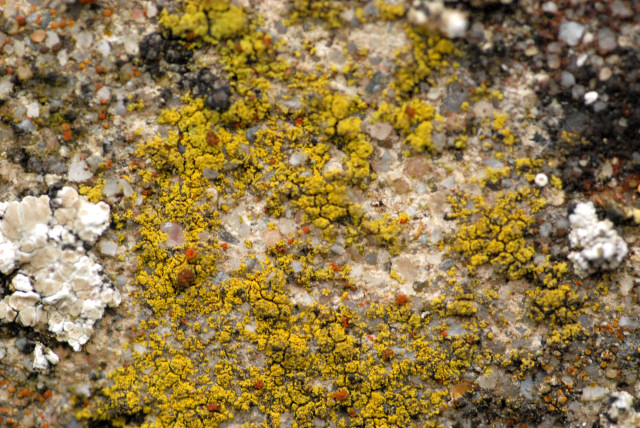
- Candelariella coralliza

Scientific classification
- Kingdom: Fungi
- Division: Ascomycota
- Class: Candelariomycetes; Voglmayr & Jaklitsch (2018)
- Order: Candelariales; Miadl., Lutzoni & Lumbsch (2007)

Families
- Candelariaceae; Pycnoraceae

= Candelariales =

Order of fungi

The Candelariales are an order of fungi in the monotypic class Candelariomycetes. It contains the families Candelariaceae and Pycnoraceae. The order was circumscribed by Jolanta Miadlikowska, François Lutzoni, and Helge Thorsten Lumbsch as part of a comprehensive phylogenetic classification of the kingdom Fungi published in 2007. The class Candelariomycetes was proposed in 2018 by Hermann Voglmayr and Walter Jaklitsch.

== Taxonomy ==
The yellow "candle-wax" lichens now grouped in Candelariomycetes were long treated as part of the large class Lecanoromycetes. A multigene study of lichen-forming fungi published in 2007 first recognized them as a distinct order, Candelariales – comprising the families Candelariaceae and Pycnoraceae – but still left the group inside Lecanoromycetes. Even earlier, Miądlikowska and co-workers had informally coined the name "Candelariomycetidae" in 2006 for this lineage, but that name was not then validly published under the botanical code. Lücking, Timdal, and Westberg later validly published Candelariomycetidae in 2017 as a new monotypic subclass within Lecanoromycetes, containing the single order Candelariales and its two families, Candelariaceae and Pycnoraceae. They designated Candelariales as the type order and Candelaria as the type genus.

In the circumscription, the subclass was characterized as a group of mostly crustose to squamulose lichens that are often bright yellow, with a green chlorococcoid photobiont and no cephalodia. The group includes species growing on rock, bark, bryophytes, soil, or, in the case of Pycnoraceae, typically on wood. The subclass is difficult to separate morphologically from other lecanoromycete subclasses, apart from the distinctive Candelaria-type ascus with a broad amyloid ring in the lower part of the tholus, it is defined chiefly by molecular phylogenetic evidence rather than by a unique set of outward structural features.

Subsequent DNA analyses that combined ribosomal (nrSSU, nrLSU, mtSSU) and protein-coding (RPB1, RPB2) gene sequences from nearly every recognised class of Leotiomyceta showed that Candelariales never groups with the lecanoroid core. Instead, it forms an isolated, well-supported branch in which Pycnoraceae is placed as the sister family (closest relative) to Candelariaceae. In the best-scoring maximum-likelihood tree the class received 88% bootstrap support (79% under parsimony) and a posterior probability of 1.0, values that molecular systematists regard as strong evidence of a genuine evolutionary grouping.

Recognising this consistent phylogenetic independence, Voglmayr and Jaklitsch erected the new class Candelariomycetes in 2018 (published 2019), with Candelariales as its type order and Candelaria as the nomenclatural type genus. Although different analyses place the class variously near Eurotiomycetes, Arthoniomycetes or Dothideomycetes, none recover it within Lecanoromycetes when a broad taxon sample is used; the lineage is therefore now treated as one of the younger, small classes of filamentous Ascomycota.

== Description ==
Members of the Candelariomycetes are readily recognised in the field by their vivid lemon- to orange-yellow thalli. The vegetative body (thallus) ranges from a paper-thin crust tightly appressed to the substrate to small, scale-like lobes (squamules) that may pile up into tiny, leaf-like rosettes. In a few species the thallus is reduced or absent and the fungus grows directly on other lichens. A green, spherical alga (a chlorococcoid photobiont) provides photosynthetic energy, and unlike some other lichen groups no cyanobacterial "cephalodia" are formed. The bright colour comes from pulvinic acid pigments in the Candelariaceae or, in the wood-inhabiting Pycnoraceae, from depsidic compounds such as alectorialic acid. Most species colonise bark or siliceous rock in well-lit, nutrient-enriched habitats; a few grow on mosses, soil, or old timber. The cosmopolitan species Candelaria concolor—common on street trees and fence rails—illustrates the group's tolerance of urban conditions.

Sexual reproduction takes place in apothecia, the tiny, often disc-shaped fruiting bodies that dot the thallus surface. These apothecia usually carry a narrow rim of thallus tissue (lecanorine margin) in Candelariaceae or a blackened rim without algal cells (lecideine) in Pycnoraceae. Inside, unbranched paraphyses (slender sterile filaments) are imbued with starch-like (amyloid) material that turns blue in iodine-based staining—a useful diagnostic character. The spore sacs (asci) are club-shaped, also amyloid, and contain eight to as many as sixty-four colourless, smooth ascospores. These ascospores are ellipsoid to lemon-shaped and lack cross-walls or show, at most, one to three indistinct septa. When sexual spores are not being produced, many species form minute flask-shaped pycnidia that exude colourless, single-celled conidia. In the 2017 subclass concept of the Candelariomycetidae, the group was defined in part by its green algal partner, absence of cephalodia, clavate asci that may contain from eight to sixty-four spores, and hyaline, simple to indistinctly septate ascospores.
