= List of lichens of Rwanda =

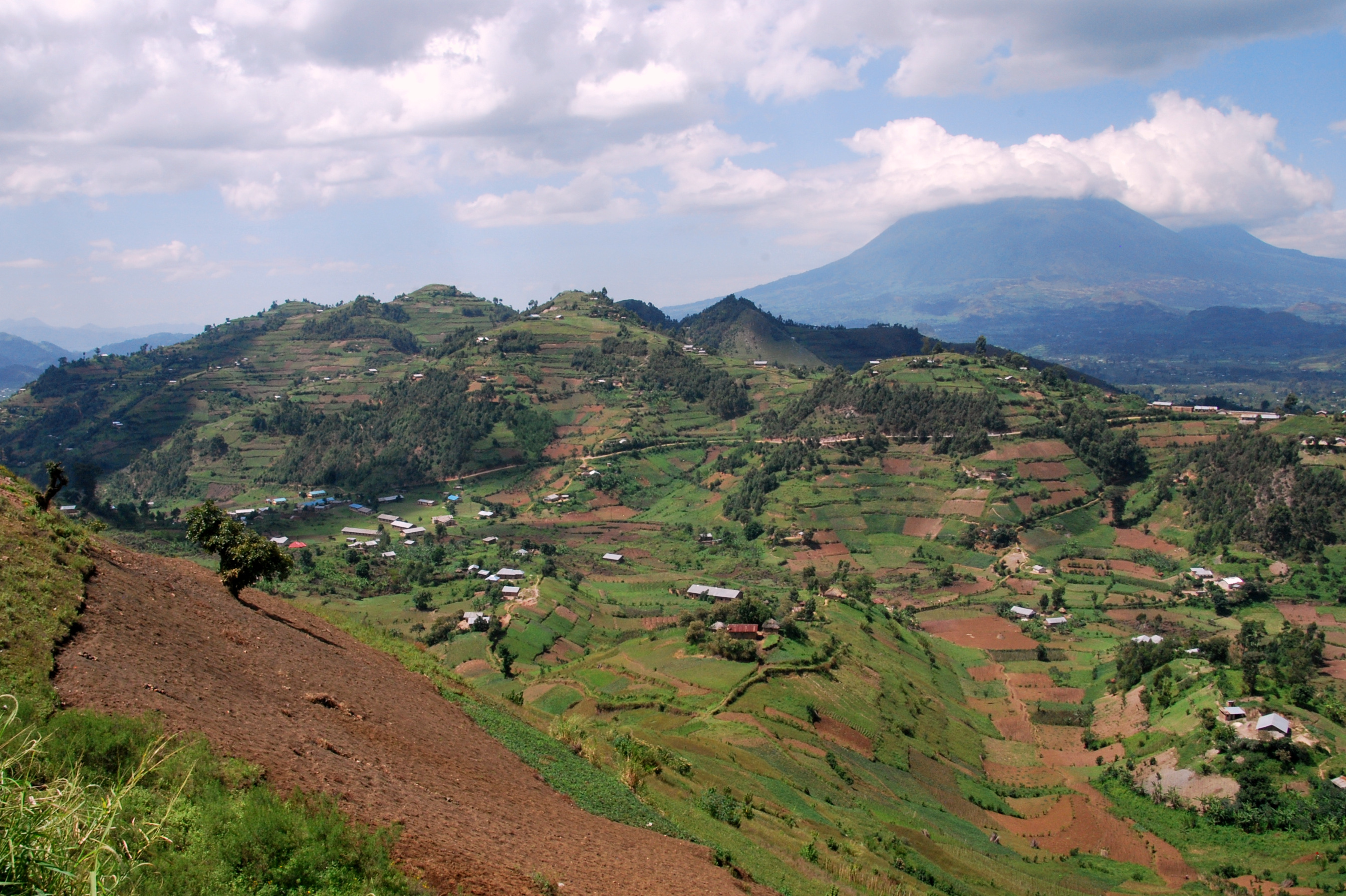
Rwandan landscape

The lichen flora of Rwanda, similar to many regions in Africa, remains incompletely documented. The first records of Rwandan lichens were published by Gustav Lindau (1911), who collected specimens during the German expedition led by Johannes Mildbraed in the Rugege forest. This was followed by extensive studies from Belgian scientists Jacques Lambinon and Emmanuël Sérusiaux in the latter half of the 20th century. Additional research was later conducted by Eberhard Fischer and colleagues.

While Thomas Douglas Victor Swinscow and Hildur Krog produced a comprehensive compilation of macrolichen flora for other East African nations (Ethiopia, Uganda, Kenya and Tanzania), Rwanda's lichen species had not been similarly catalogued. Considerable gaps in documentation exist, particularly in the Byumba province of northern Rwanda, where no lichen records were published. Many groups of Rwandan lichens remain unstudied, including lichenicolous fungi, of which only four species have been documented.

The lichen flora of Rwanda shows significant variation across different altitudinal zones and habitats, from montane forests to dry savannas. In the montane forest zones, lichens often form exuberant growths, with many species showing specific preferences for certain elevation ranges. The bamboo zones, Hagenia-Hypericum forests, and high-altitude ericaceous vegetation each harbour distinctive lichen communities.

This is a list of the lichen species in Rwanda. It is based on the 2007 checklist by Christina Bock, Markus Hauck, and Fischer, and new records of species from the country published since that time.

== Species ==
- Anzia afromontana
- Arthonia cyanea
- Arthonia cinnabarina
- Bacidia griseoalba
- Buellia argilliseda
- Buellia disciformis
- Buellia stellulata
- Bulbothrix hypochraea
- Bulbothrix isidiza
- Bulbothrix pustulata
- Bulbothrix sensibilis
- Bunodophoron melanocarpum
- Calicium trabinellum
- Caloplaca ferruginea
- Candelaria concolor
- Candelaria fibrosa
- Candelariella xanthostigma
- Canoparmelia aptata
- Canoparmelia crozalsiana
- Canoparmelia ecaperata
- Canoparmelia nairobiensis
- Canoparmelia somaliensis
- Canoparmelia texana
- Catillaria alba
- Cetrariastrum sorocheilum
- Cetrariastrum vexans
- Chaenotheca chrysocephala
- Chaenotheca furfuracea
- Chaenotheca stemonea
- Chaenotheca trichialis
- Chrysothrix xanthina
- Cladonia diplotypa
- Cladonia pyxidata
- Coccocarpia erythroxyli
- Coccocarpia palmicola
- Coccocarpia pellita
- Collema pulcellum
- Dermatocarpon aequinoctiale
- Dibaeis holstii
- Diploschistes scruposus
- Dirinaria applanata
- Dirinaria complicata
- Dirinaria confluens
- Dirinaria picta
- Echinoplaca furcata
- Erioderma meiocarpum
- Everniopsis trulla
- Fellhanera lambinonii
- Flavoparmelia subamplexa
- Flavopunctelia flaventior
- Graphis scripta
- Graphis tetralocularis
- Gyalideopsis cochlearifera
- Haematomma puniceum
- Heterodermia comosa
- Heterodermia diademata
- Heterodermia hypochraea
- Heterodermia hypoleuca
- Heterodermia isidiophora
- Heterodermia japonica
- Heterodermia leucomelos
- Heterodermia loriformis
- Heterodermia lutescens
- Heterodermia obscurata
- Heterodermia pindurae
- Heterodermia podocarpa
- Heterodermia speciosa
- Heterodermia vulgaris
- Hyperphyscia syncolla
- Hypogymnia physodes
- Hypotrachyna chlorina
- Hypotrachyna ducalis
- Hypotrachyna massartii
- Hypotrachyna neodissecta
- Hypotrachyna rwandensis
- Leptogium adpressum
- Leptogium azureum
- Leptogium cyanescens
- Leptogium phyllocarpum
- Lobaria discolor
- Lobaria pulmonaria
- Lobaria retigera
- Nephroma tropicum
- Normandina pulchella
- Nyungwea pallida

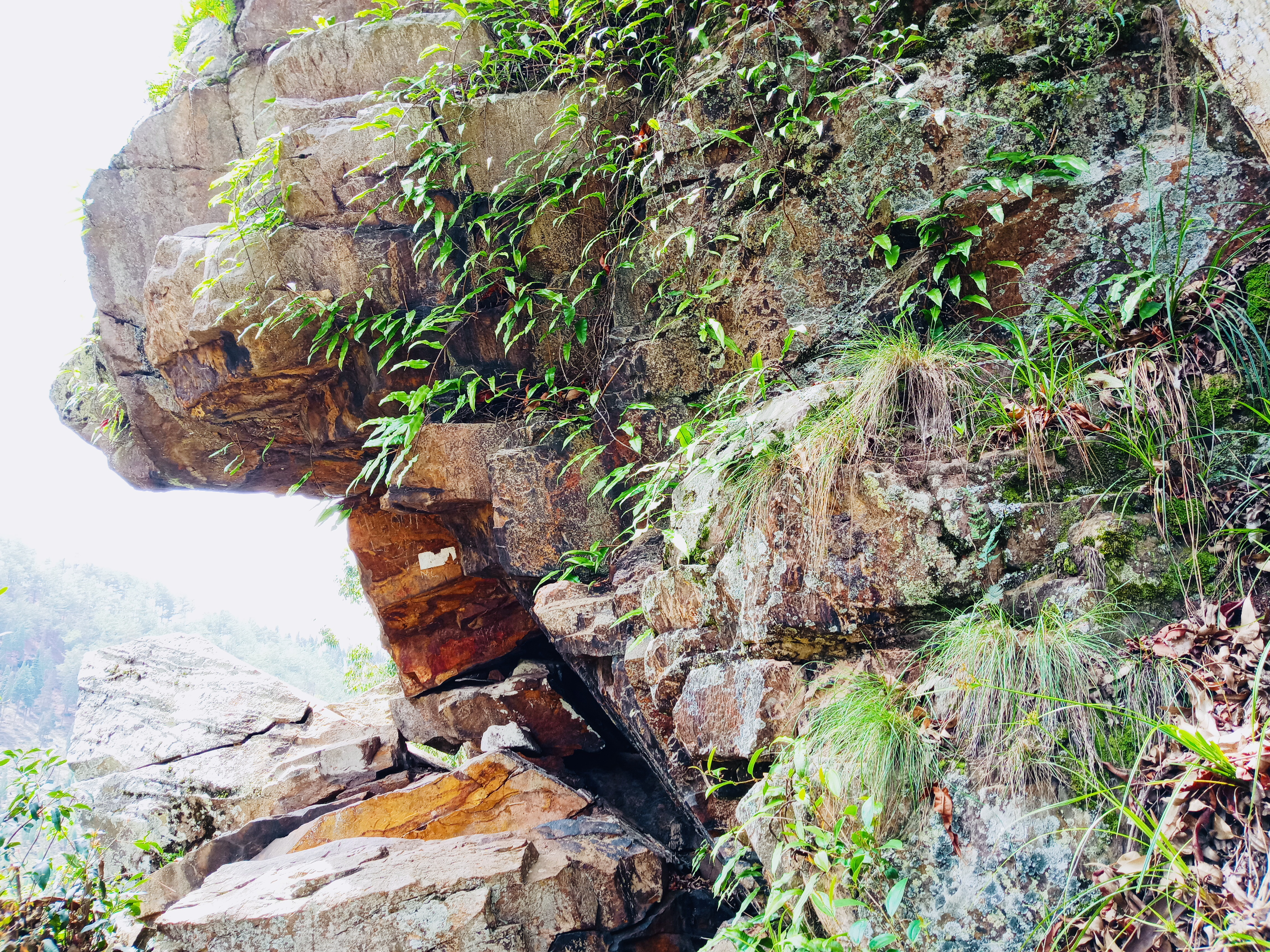
Some crustose lichens grow amongst a small community of organisms on this rock outcrop on Kanyarira mountain in Muhanga

- Pannaria rubiginosa
- Parmelinella wallichiana
- Parmelinopsis horrescens
- Parmotrema abessinicum
- Parmotrema afrocetratum
- Parmotrema andinum
- Parmotrema austrosinense
- Parmotrema bangii
- Parmotrema clavuliferum
- Parmotrema cooperi
- Parmotrema crinitum
- Parmotrema cristiferum
- Parmotrema defectum
- Parmotrema eunetum
- Parmotrema gardneri
- Parmotrema hababianum
- Parmotrema lambinonii
- Parmotrema mellissii
- Parmotrema neotropicum
- Parmotrema permutatum
- Parmotrema poolii
- Parmotrema pseudeunetum
- Parmotrema pseudograyanum
- Parmotrema ravum
- Parmotrema reticulatum
- Parmotrema soyauxii
- Parmotrema subhannigtonianum
- Parmotrema tinctorum
- Phaeophyscia hispidula
- Physcia aipolia
- Physcia erumpens
- Physcia krogiae
- Physcia poncinsii
- Physcia verrucosa
- Placopsis parellina
- Pleopsidium chlorophanum
- Pseudocyphellaria aurata
- Pseudocyphellaria clathrata
- Pseudocyphellaria crocata
- Pseudocyphellaria intricata
- Punctelia rudecta
- Pyrrhospora russula
- Pyxine cocoes
- Pyxine katendei
- Pyxine petricola
- Pyxine reticulata
- Pyxine subcinerea

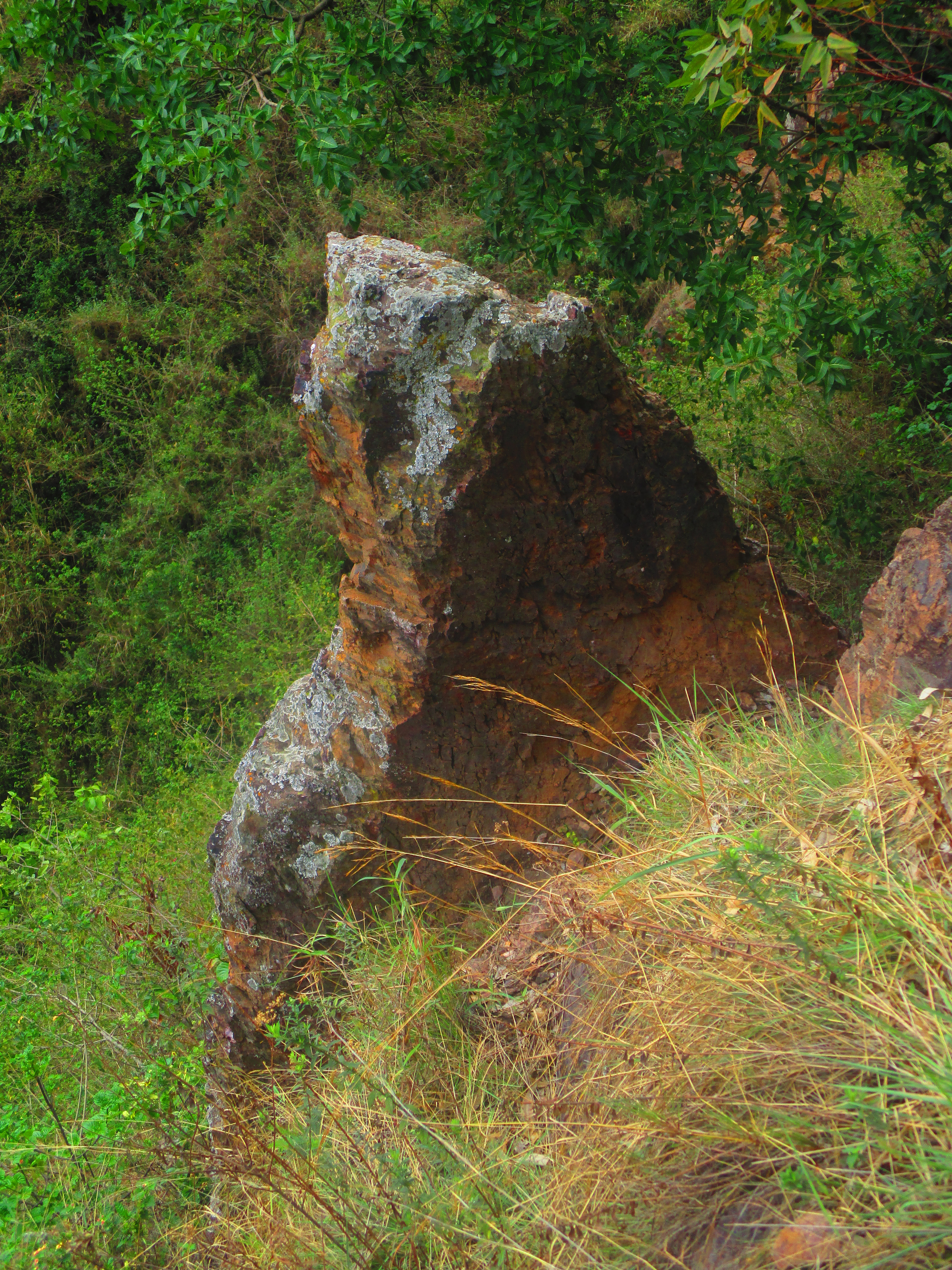
Crustose lichens on a rock on Mount Kigali

- Ramalina africana
- Ramalina calcarata
- Ramalina celastri
- Ramalina disparata
- Ramalina fimbriata
- Ramalina hoehneliana
- Ramalina pusiola
- Ramalina reducta
- Ramalina roesleri
- Ramalina subpusilla
- Solorina simensis
- Stereocaulon anomalum
- Stereocaulon atlanticum
- Stereocaulon claviceps
- Stereocaulon foliolosum
- Stereocaulon meyeri
- Stereocaulon nigromaculatum
- Stereocaulon pomiferum
- Stereocaulon ramulosum
- Stereocaulon vulcani
- Sticta ambavillaria
- Sticta fuliginosa
- Sticta limbata
- Sticta weigelii
- Syncesia afromontana
- Teloschistes chrysophthalmus
- Teloschistes exilis
- Teloschistes flavicans
- Teloschistes hypoglaucus
- Teloschistes perrugosus
- Thelotrema lepadinum
- Tylophoron moderatum
- Tylophoron protrudens
- Umbilicaria aprina
- Usnea complanata
- Usnea dasaea
- Usnea exasperata
- Usnea himantodes
- Usnea perhispidella
- Xanthoparmelia subramigera

Lichenicolous fungi:

- Lambinonia strigulae
- Nyungwea tenuiloba
- Plectocarpon nyungweense
- Talpapellis solorinae
