= Syncesia afromontana =

Scientific classification
- Kingdom: Fungi
- Division: Ascomycota
- Class: Arthoniomycetes
- Order: Arthoniales
- Family: Roccellaceae
- Genus: Syncesia
- Species: S. afromontana

Binomial name
- Syncesia afromontana Ertz, Killmann, Sérus. & Eb.Fisch. (2010)

Species of lichen

Syncesia afromontana is a rare species of lichen-forming fungus in the family Roccellaceae. It is found in Rwanda. The lichen has a byssoid (wispy, like teased wool), water-repellent thallus that is greyish to greyish-green and up to 10 cm (4 in) in diameter. It contains protocetraric acid as a major metabolite, and trace amounts of roccellic acid. It is distinguished from other members of its genus by producing ascospores with seven internal divisions rather than the typical three, making it unique within the group.

== Taxonomy ==
The lichen was formally described as a new species in 2010 by Damien Ertz, Dorothee Killmann, Emmanuël Sérusiaux, and Eberhard Fischer. The type specimen was collected in the Rwasenkoko swamp area of Nyungwe Forest (Southern Province) at an elevation of 2,335 m (7,661 ft). It is only known to occur at the type locality, where it grows on the trunks of Erica in thickets of Erica mannii as well as in forests of Hagenia abyssinica and Rapanea melanophloeios. Another member of the genus described in the same publication, S. madagascariensis, was later reported from Réunion (Indian Ocean).

== Description ==
Syncesia afromontana is a crustose lichen that forms distinctive colonies on tree bark in montane forests of central Africa. The thallus (lichen body) develops as moderately sized patches reaching up to 10 cm in diameter, presenting a characteristic byssoid (cotton-like) texture when fresh. The surface is matt and continuous, with greyish to greyish-green colouration with pronounced water-repellent properties. The thallus maintains a relatively substantial thickness of 150–400 micrometres (μm) and has a distinctive corticate structure with an overlying algal layer measuring 35–55 μm.

The photobiont layer contains Trentepohlia algae—the essential photosynthetic partner in this lichen symbiosis—which appear as distinctly segmented, carbonized hypothallus structures. These algal cells form a characteristic black framework that is readily visible in cross-section and contributes to the species' distinctive appearance. The internal architecture shows well-developed zonation with clearly demarcated cortical and medullary regions.

The reproductive structures (ascomata) represent the most taxonomically significant feature of this species. These develop as solitary, rounded to slightly flattened perithecia, typically measuring 0.2–0.8 mm in diameter when mature. Unlike many related species, the ascomata of S. afromontana maintain relatively simple, non-stromatoid organization without the complex radiating ridge patterns seen in other Syncesia species. The ascomata possess a distinctive black hypothecium (the layer beneath the spore-bearing surface).

The ascospores (sexual spores) provide the definitive diagnostic characteristic for this species, being consistently 7-septate (divided into eight compartments by seven internal cross-walls). These spores are hyaline (colourless), fusiform (spindle-shaped), and measure roughly 42–46 × 52–55 μm. This septation pattern is taxonomically exceptional, as S. afromontana is the only member of Syncesia to produce 7-septate ascospores, distinguishing it clearly from the typically 3-septate condition. Chemical analysis reveals protocetraric acid as the primary secondary metabolite, detectable through thin-layer chromatography. Additional chemical constituents include traces of roccellic acid derivatives.

== See also ==
- List of lichens of Rwanda
