= Dirinaria neotropica =

Scientific classification
- Kingdom: Fungi
- Division: Ascomycota
- Class: Lecanoromycetes
- Order: Caliciales
- Family: Caliciaceae
- Genus: Dirinaria
- Species: D. neotropica

Binomial name
- Dirinaria neotropica Kalb, 2004

Synonyms
- Dirinaria confusa var. saxicola (Räsänen) Awasthi, Biblioth. Lichenol. 2: 60 (1975)

Species of fungus

Dirinaria neotropica is a species of lichen belonging to the genus Dirinaria within the family Caliciaceae. It was described by Kalb in 2004.

== Morphology ==
Dirinaria neotropica is characterized by a foliose thallus that is almost crustose, ranging from closely appressed to agglutinated. The lobes are pinnately or subpinnately lobate, radiating, and may be slightly disjunct or merely adjacent. They are typically flat or convex but may be concave towards the apex. The upper surface varies in color, ranging from yellowish-gray, greenish-gray, gray, lead-gray, to bluish gray, often darker at the apex. Pseudocyphellae are often distinct, marginal, and laminal, usually restricted to the peripheral parts of the lobes, and may sometimes be reticulately confluent. The medulla is white, sometimes with orange hues towards the lobe tips, while the lower surface is black in the center, becoming paler towards the lobe tips and lacking rhizines.

=== Reproduction ===
Apothecia are common, laminal on the thallus, with black discs. Ascospores are brown, 1-septate, ellipsoid, measuring 10-15 x 4.5-6 μm. Pycnidia are immersed in warts, producing bacilliform conidia.

== Chemistry ==
Spot tests on the upper cortex reveal K+ yellow, C−, KC−, P+ yellow, while the medulla shows K−, C−, KC−, P−. Secondary metabolites include atranorin in the upper cortex, and divaricatic acid and a few terpenes in low concentration in the medulla.

== Substrate and ecology ==
Dirinaria neotropica is found on rocks from sea level to the edges of montane rain forests.

== Distribution ==
The species has a wide distribution in tropical and subtropical regions of North and South America. In the Sonoran region, Dirinaria neotropica is known to inhabit various habitats ranging from arid transition areas to oak-conifer forests. It can be found in Arizona, Baja California Sur, Chihuahua, and Sonora.

== Synonymy ==
Dirinaria neotropica has been synonymized with Dirinaria confusa var. saxicola by Awasthi in 1975. Dirinaria neotropica can be distinguished by its smaller ascospores, measuring 10-15 x 4.5-6 μm.

== Bibliography ==
- Kalb, K. (2004) Dirinaria (pp. 98-103) In: Nash III, T.H.; Ryan, B.D.; Diederich, P.; Gries, C. and Bungartz, F. (eds.), Lichen Flora of the Greater Sonoran Desert Region, Vol. 2. Lichens Unlimited, Arizona State University, Tempe, Arizona, 742 pages. (Discussion of Dirinaria neotropica: p. 100; black-and-white photo: p. 100, fig. 10)
