= Candelaria asiatica =

Scientific classification
- Kingdom: Fungi
- Division: Ascomycota
- Class: Candelariomycetes
- Order: Candelariales
- Family: Candelariaceae
- Genus: Candelaria
- Species: C. asiatica

Binomial name
- Candelaria asiatica D.Liu & J.S.Hur (2018)

Species of lichen

Candelaria asiatica is a lichen-forming fungus in the genus Candelaria, family Candelariaceae. Recognized by its small yellow lobate thallus, this species is found growing under open areas in forests. It is distributed in South Asia, Pakistan and China.

== Taxonomy ==
Candelaria asiatica was described by Dong Liu and Jae-Seon Hur in 2018. The epithet asiatica ("from Asia") refers to the species' geographic distribution.

== Description ==
The vegetative body, or thallus, of the lichen is foliose to sub-fruticose. The colour ranges from yellow to greenish yellow in the centre and bright yellow on the outside tip of the thallus. The thallus is lobate with a powdery surface and fragile lobe margins with basidia or phyllidia-like lobules. The thallus is minute, 0.2–1.2 cm wide, but aggregates to form extensive colonies which cover the substrate. Lobes of the thallus are linear and irregularly branched and range from adnate to erect. The upper cortex is distinct with chlorococcoid algae distributed below the upper cortex. The medulla is not well developed and is white in colour. The lower cortex is present near the centre of the thallus and lacks a lobe tip. The lower surface is covered with white rhizines.

The results of chemical spot tests for identification include K−, KC−, C−, PD−. Major lichen substances present in Candelaria asiatica are calycin, a UV filter or UVA screening compound, and pulvinic acid, a natural chemical pigment.

=== Similar species ===
Similar to Candelaria concolor, Candelaria asiatica differs in lobe tips and margins. Their margins are not round or smooth, and are fragile with blastidia, making them look sorediate. The thallus also has a distinct powdery surface unlike C. concolor. Candelaria asiatica forms a clade with two other species and is the sister group of C. crawfordii. Both of them are collected from Asia.

== Habitat and distribution ==
Candelaria asiatica is distributed in South Asia, China, and Pakistan. It is found growing under open areas in forests and arboretums. It has been found growing on Cerasus species.
