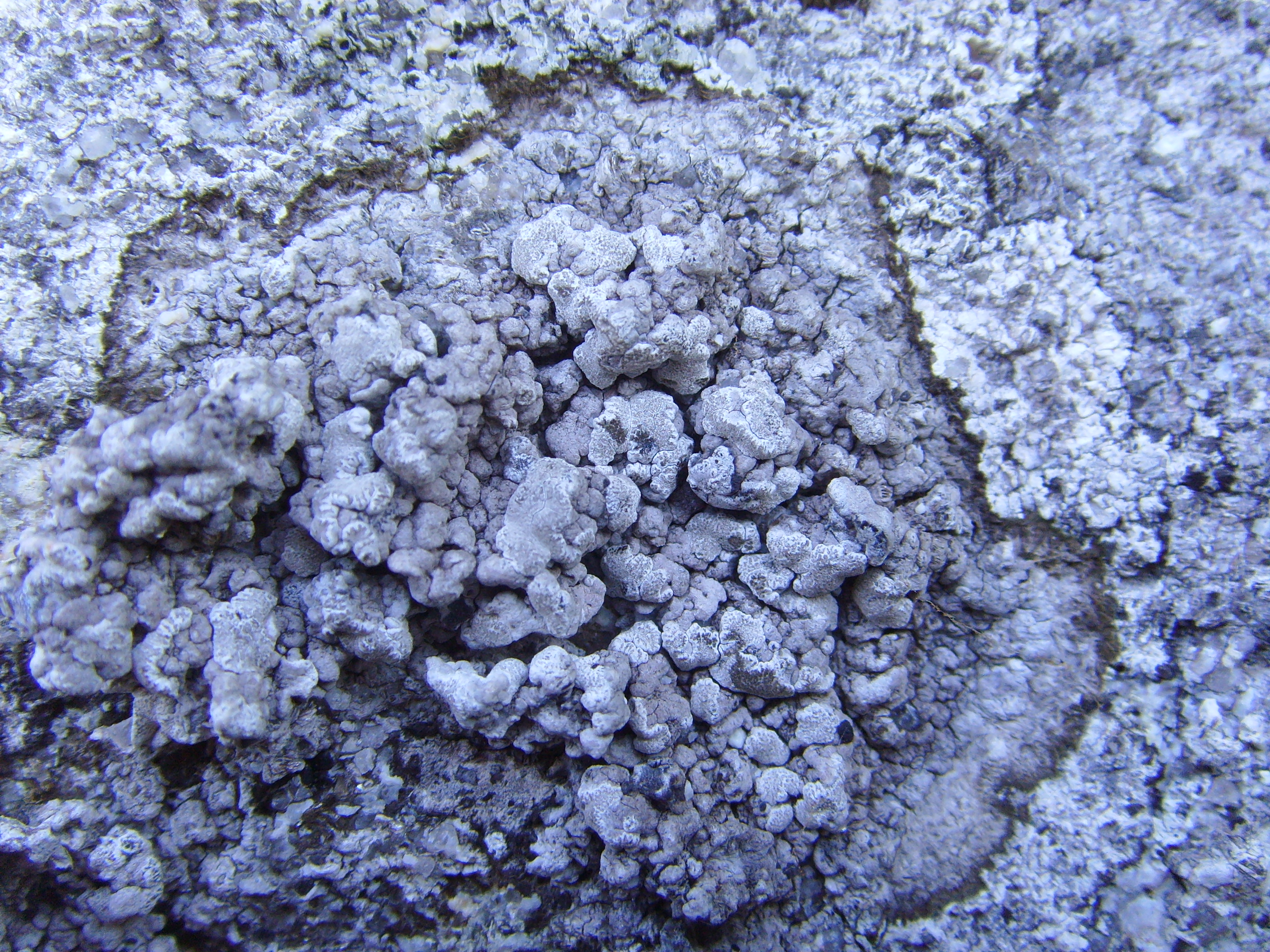
- Syncesia myrticola

Scientific classification
- Kingdom: Fungi
- Division: Ascomycota
- Class: Arthoniomycetes
- Order: Arthoniales
- Family: Roccellaceae
- Genus: Syncesia; Taylor (1836)

Type species
- Syncesia albida Taylor (1836)

= Syncesia =

Genus of lichens

Syncesia is a genus of lichen-forming fungi in the family Roccellaceae. These lichens typically grow as thin crusts on tree bark in humid environments, forming small raised patches that contain multiple tiny disc-shaped fruiting bodies. The genus includes about nine species found primarily in tropical and subtropical regions around the world, from the Caribbean and South America to Africa and Asia. Many species produce powdery patches on their surface that help them spread to new locations without sexual reproduction.

== Taxonomy ==
The genus was circumscribed in 1836 by the English botanist Thomas Taylor. Taylor established the genus based on the single species Syncesia albida, collected from dry shaded rocks between Dunkerron and Killarney in County Kerry, Ireland. In his original description, he noted the genus's distinctive crustaceous thallus with oblong-elongate, stellate-radiate apothecia (fruiting bodies) that are aggregated and immersed in scattered thalline verrucae. Taylor acknowledged difficulty in placing the genus among existing lichen classifications, noting its apparent relationship to Porina and Verrucaria while recognizing its distinct characteristics, particularly the fibrous vertical structure and blackish-brown spore-bearing surface reminiscent of certain Lecanora and Lecidea species.

== Description ==
Syncesia lichens form a thin, crust-like thallus that grows mostly on the surface of bark and, less often, on rock. A brown prothallus—a marginal zone of fungal tissue—may be visible, but the outer cortex is either absent or only faintly developed, consisting of loosely interwoven fungal threads (hyphae). The photosynthetic partner (photobiont) is a member of the filamentous green algal genus Trentepohlia. Some species produce pale-grey farinose soralia—powdery patches packed with highly light-reflective crystals that function as vegetative propagules.

The sexual reproductive bodies are small apothecia (0.1–0.5 mm in diameter) that sit in slightly raised, often irregular stromata and can contain five to fifteen disc-shaped cavities. These discs are exposed, usually dusted with a frost-like bloom (pruina) and may have uneven outlines. A thin rim of thallus tissue borders each disc, while the proper exciple—the fungal wall immediately surrounding the hymenium—is poorly developed and brown. Internally, a pale- to dark-brown epithecium overlies a consistently dark-brown hypothecium that can extend into the substrate. The hymenium itself is filled with sparingly branched, colourless, septate paraphysoids immersed in a clear gel that turns blue in iodine. Each club-shaped ascus bears eight colourless, three-celled ascospores that are spindle-shaped and slightly curved, with one end more tapered than the other; the asci release their spores by splitting along two wall layers (fissitunicate discharge).

Asexual reproduction occurs in tiny, brown-to-black pycnidia, either raised above or immersed in the thallus and 50–200 μm across. These structures exude long, thread-like, non-septate conidia that are straight to curved. Chemically, most species contain protocetraric acid along with other orcinol- and β-orcinol-based depsides, fatty acids and dibenzofurans. Syncesia typically colonises bark in humid habitats, although some species tolerate mineral substrates. Historically placed in Chiodecton because of its stromatic apothecia, the genus is now separated by the presence of a pruinose or felted stroma that encloses multiple innate, disc-like ascomata.

== Species ==
- Syncesia afromontana Ertz, Killmann, Sérus. & Eb.Fisch. (2010) – Africa
- Syncesia byssolomoides M.Cáceres, A.A.Menezes & Aptroot (2013) – Brazil
- Syncesia farinacea (Fée) Tehler (1997)
- Syncesia indica S.Joshi & Upreti (2011) – India
- Syncesia madagascariensis Ertz, Killmann, Razafindr., Sérus. & Eb.Fisch. (2010) – Africa
- Syncesia mascarena van den Boom, Ertz, M.Brand & Sérus. (2011) – Réunion
- Syncesia myrticola (Fée) Tehler (1997)
- Syncesia palmensis (Vain.) Ertz & Tehler (2014)
- Syncesia subintegra Sipman (2009)
