= Hypotrachyna rwandensis =

Scientific classification
- Kingdom: Fungi
- Division: Ascomycota
- Class: Lecanoromycetes
- Order: Lecanorales
- Family: Parmeliaceae
- Genus: Hypotrachyna
- Species: H. rwandensis

Binomial name
- Hypotrachyna rwandensis Elix, Eb.Fisch. & Killmann (2005)

Species of lichen

Hypotrachyna rwandensis is a species of saxicoous (rock-dwelling) foliose lichen in the family Parmeliaceae. It was discovered in 1999 in a high-elevation swamp environment in southern Rwanda, where it grows exclusively on ancient schist rock formations. The species is distinguished by its greyish, leaf-like appearance with fine hair-like projections along the edges and dense, branching reproductive structures on its surface. As of 2007, it remains one of five Hypotrachyna species documented in Rwanda.

== Taxonomy ==
Hypotrachyna rwandensis was described as new to science in 2005 by John Elix, Eberhard Fischer and Dorothee Killmann from material collected in October 1999 on schistose rock at Rwasenkoko, Gikongoro Province, Rwanda (2,350 m); the holotype is in the herbarium of the Berlin Botanical Garden and Botanical Museum (B), with an isotype in the Australian National Herbarium (CANB). The epithet refers to Rwanda. The authors distinguished it from the superficially similar H. neodissecta by its ciliate lobe margins, the presence of small lobules in the thallus centre, somewhat larger ascospores, and a different medullary chemistry that includes 5-O-methylhiascic acid as a major secondary metabolite. They also noted its resemblance to Parmelinopsis horrescens but that species has narrower lobes, mainly simple rhizines, and a different major medullary compound.

== Description ==
This is a foliose (leaf-like) lichen forming rosettes about 5–6 cm across on rock. Lobes are somewhat linear and overlapping, 1–3.5 mm wide, with tips that are rounded to blunt-cut; the lobe margins bear cilia—fine, hair-like extensions visible with a hand lens. The upper surface is pale to dark grey, smooth and somewhat shiny near the tips, without pale maculae (patches). Small secondary lobes (lobules) occur towards the thallus centre (typically 0.2–1.0 mm wide). Isidia (minute, finger-like outgrowths used for vegetative reproduction) are dense on the surface; they start cylindrical and often branch into short, coral-like tufts, with cortex-covered tips that often themselves become ciliate. The lower surface is black (becoming brownish near the lobe tips) and anchored by very dense, repeatedly forked rhizines (root-like holdfasts). Fruiting bodies (apothecia) are uncommon; when present they are 3–5 mm wide, sit on the thallus surface with a short stalk, have a dark-brown disc that can crack radially with age, and a rim densely covered in isidia. Ascospores are ellipsoid, 13–15 × 8–10 μm. No pycnidia were observed.

Chemically, the cortex reacts K+ (yellow) and contains atranorin and chloroatranorin. The medulla is K−, C+ (red) and KC+ (red), P−, UV−, with gyrophoric acid and 5-O-methylhiascic acid as major substances, plus minor lecanoric and hiascic acids and traces of related methylated derivatives. Standard spot tests give a yellow reaction on the surface (K) and a red reaction within (C/KC), which, together with the metabolite profile determined by chromatography, helps separate this species from lookalikes.

== Habitat and distribution ==
The species is saxicolous, known to occur only at its type locality on Precambrian schist in the Rwasenkoko swamp, a cold-air basin at 2,350 m in southern Rwanda. The site shows a vegetation inversion: montane forest with Kuloa usambarensis and Podocarpus latifolius occupies nearby hill-crests, afroalpine Hagenia abyssinica and Erica johnstonii stands line the slopes, and the valley floor carries afromontane swamp vegetation (e.g., Lobelia mildbraedii, Cyperus denudatus, Alchemilla johnstonii, Swertia adolfi-fiderici). Night-time temperatures can dip below freezing. Within this setting, H. rwandensis was found on rock outcrops; the site has also yielded the typically high-elevation lichen Hypogymnia physodes. As of 2007, it was one of five Hypotrachnyna species that have been documented in Rwanda.

== See also ==
- List of lichens of Rwanda
