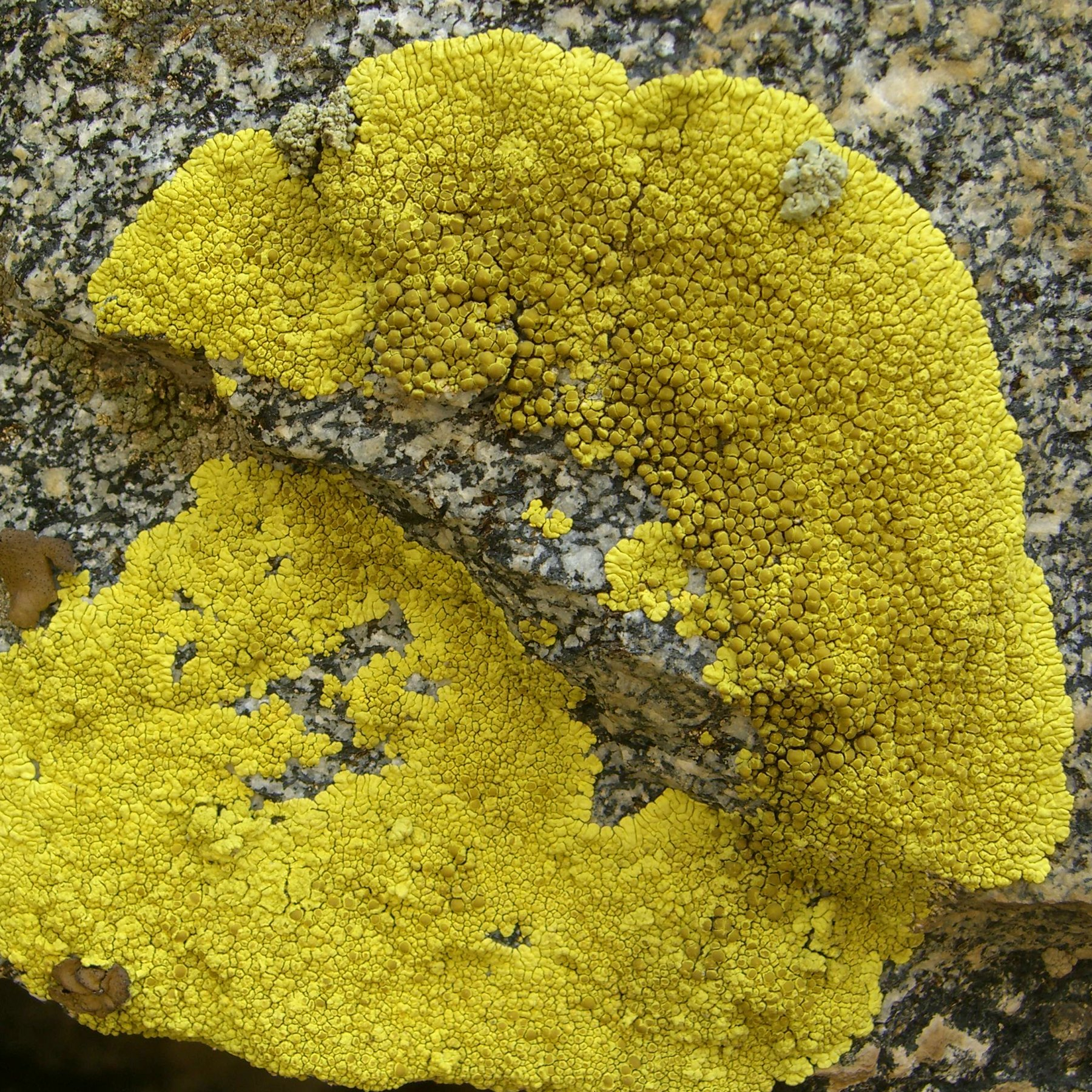
- Pleopsidium flavum

Scientific classification
- Kingdom: Fungi
- Division: Ascomycota
- Class: Lecanoromycetes
- Order: Acarosporales
- Family: Acarosporaceae
- Genus: Pleopsidium
- Species: P. flavum

Binomial name
- Pleopsidium flavum (Bellardi) Körb.

Synonyms
- Acarospora chlorophana

= Pleopsidium flavum =

Species of fungus

Pleopsidium flavum (gold cobblestone lichen) is a distinctively colored, bright lemon-yellow to chartreuse crustose lichen that grows in high elevations (montane to alpine) on vertical or overhanging hard felsic rock (e.g. granite) in western North America. Its thallus grows in a circular outwardly radiating pattern (placodioid), with 1mm wide lobed edges. This is the identity of the vivid, lime-green lichens often photographed on granite boulders in the Wichita Mountains Wildlife Refuge of Oklahoma. According to Prof. Wayne Armstrong of Mount Palomar College, This lichen only grows "a few millimeters" per century., making it the slowest growing of all known plants (sensu lato).

It was formerly classified as Acarospora chlorophana. It is in the Pleopsidium genus of the Acarosporaceae family.

It is similar to Acarospora schleicheri, which grows on soil (terricolous lichen) and rarely on rock, and to Pleopsidium chlorophanum, which favors dry arctic or alpine sandstone cliffs and boulders.
