= Dirinaria frostii =

Conservation status
- Apparently Secure (NatureServe)

Scientific classification
- Kingdom: Fungi
- Division: Ascomycota
- Class: Lecanoromycetes
- Order: Caliciales
- Family: Caliciaceae
- Genus: Dirinaria
- Species: D. frostii

Binomial name
- Dirinaria frostii (Tuck.) Hale & Culb.

Species of fungus

Dirinaria frostii is a species of lichen in the family Caliciaceae. It is commonly found in the southeastern United States and Sonora, Mexico. The species was first described by Tuckerman and later classified by Hale & Culberson.

== Description ==
Dirinaria frostii has a foliose thallus, which is closely appressed to agglutinated and ranges from 1 to 3 cm in diameter. The lobes are dichotomously pinnately or subpinnately lobate, radiating, and often confluent. The upper surface can be gray, bluish gray, or yellowish gray, sometimes with white patchy pruinosity. Soredia are initially marginal, becoming laminal, and pseudocyphellae are mainly marginal. The medulla is typically white, occasionally with orange spots at lobe tips. The lower surface is black in the center, becoming paler towards the lobe tips. Apothecia are rarely present, and if so, they have brown, 1-septate ascospores. Spot tests reveal that the upper cortex is K+ yellow, C−, KC−, P+ yellow, while the medulla is K−, C−, KC−, P−. Secondary metabolites include atranorin in the upper cortex and divaricatic acid in the medulla, along with a few terpenes in low concentration.

== Distribution and habitat ==
Dirinaria frostii primarily inhabits rocks, occasionally found on bark, and thrives in shaded areas such as thorn and deciduous forests. Its distribution spans the north- and southeastern United States, including areas from the upper Great Lakes region and southern New England south to the southern Atlantic and Gulf coastal states. In Mexico, it is particularly abundant in Baja California Sur, Chihuahua, and Sonora.

== Conservation ==
In the United States, Dirinaria frostii holds various statuses across different states. It is designated as NNR (National Natural Heritage Rank) at the national level. In Kentucky, it is classified as S2. Wisconsin assigns it the status of SH (State Historical Rank). In Georgia, North Carolina, and Pennsylvania, it is recognized as SNR (State Natural Heritage Rank). Additionally, the species is assessed as G4 (rounded) (Note: A G4 conservation status implies that it is generally secure but may face localized threats or declines in certain areas.) as of 2000.

== Bibliography ==
- Nash, T.H., Ryan, B.D., Gries, C., Bungartz, F., (eds.) 2004. Lichen Flora of the Greater Sonoran Desert Region. Vol 2.
