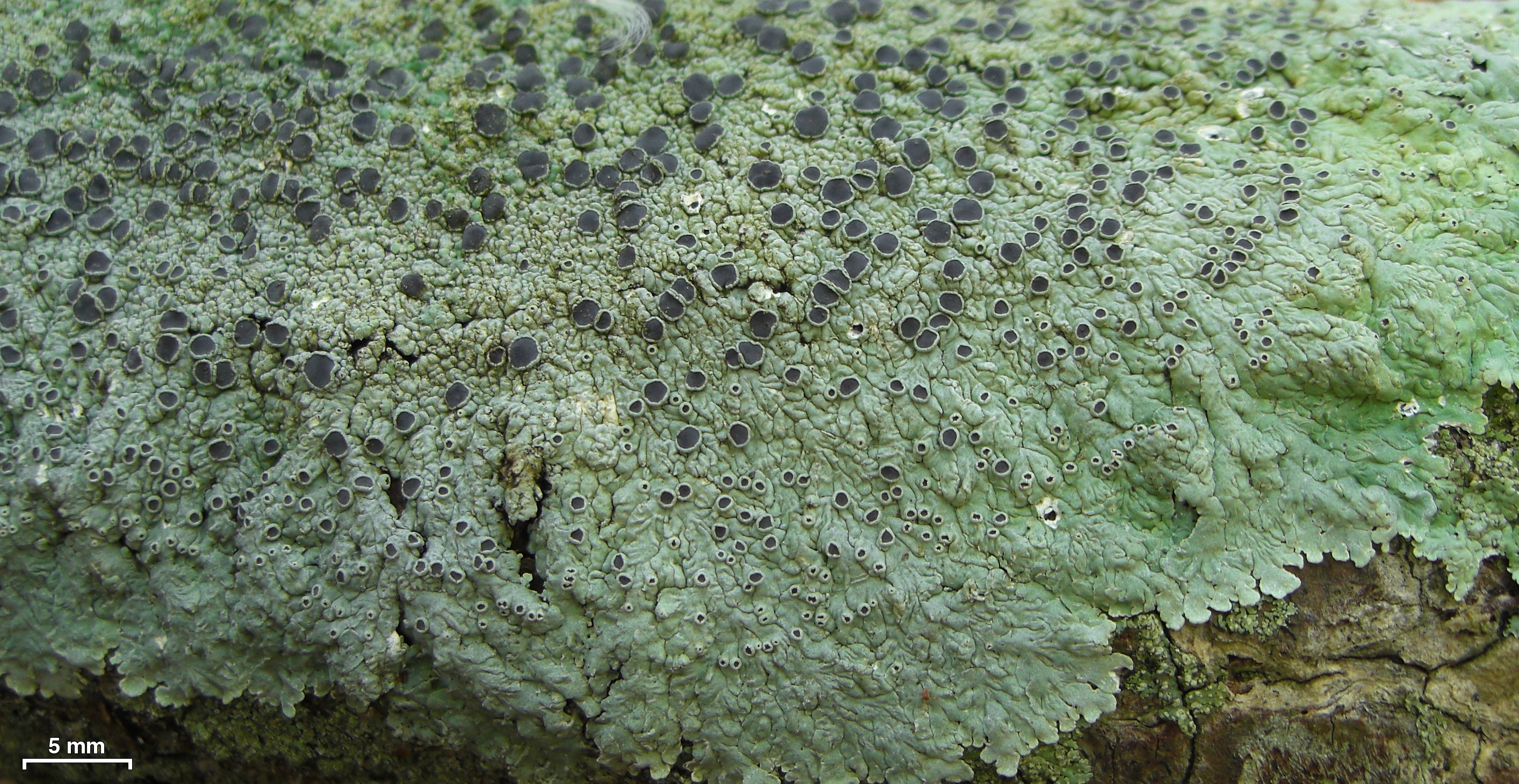

Conservation status
- Secure (NatureServe)

Scientific classification
- Kingdom: Fungi
- Division: Ascomycota
- Class: Lecanoromycetes
- Order: Caliciales
- Family: Caliciaceae
- Genus: Dirinaria
- Species: D. confusa

Binomial name
- Dirinaria confusa D. D. Awasthi

= Dirinaria confusa =

Species of fungus

Dirinaria confusa is a species of fungus within the family Caliciaceae, belonging to the order Caliciales in the class Lecanoromycetes of the division Ascomycota.

== Taxonomy ==
Two subspecies are recognized:

- D. confusa saxicola
- D. confusa confusa

== Description ==
Dirinaria confusa exhibits foliose thalli, which are approximately pressed and loosely pressed at the tips of lobes, with a maximum diameter of up to 8 cm. The lobes display a pinnate or subpinnate lobate structure, spreading out and merging, typically flat or convex but occasionally concave towards the tips, measuring between 0.2 and 3 mm wide. Notably, they take on a distinct fan-like appearance towards the lobe tips.

On the upper surface, the coloration varies from gray to bluish gray, nearly white, or straw-colored, sometimes with a slight powdery coating or lacking such. There are no visible soralia, isidia, or polysidiangia, but distinctive pseudocyphellae are evident, primarily located on the edges and surface, occasionally forming interconnected patterns. The medulla is either entirely white or shows a hint of orange at its base. The lower surface starts dark at the center and gradually lightens towards the tips of the lobes, lacking any rhizines.

=== Reproductive structures ===
Apothecia are often present, found laminal on the thallus, with diameters ranging from 0.5 to 1.5 mm. The disc is black, slightly grayish pruinose, sometimes lacking a pruina. Ascospores are brown, 1-septate, narrowly ellipsoid, with dimensions of 12-19 x 5-7 μm. Pycnidia are immersed in warts, containing bacilliform conidia measuring 3-4 x 1 μm.

== Chemistry ==
Spot tests conducted on the upper cortex indicate K+ yellow, C−, KC−, P+ yellow reactions, whereas the medulla tests negative for K, C, KC, and P. The secondary metabolites identified include atranorin in the upper cortex, with sekikaic acid as the major compound, along with minor amounts of ramalinolic acid, and a few terpenes present in low concentrations in the medulla.

== Habitat and distribution ==
Dirinaria confusa is frequently encountered on bark and wood, especially in proximity to coastal regions. Its distribution spans tropical and subtropical areas of North, Central, and South America, with notable occurrences in Texas.

=== Conservation status ===
Dirinaria confusa is classified as G5, indicating a widespread and abundant species.
