= Graphis tetralocularis =

Scientific classification
- Kingdom: Fungi
- Division: Ascomycota
- Class: Lecanoromycetes
- Order: Graphidales
- Family: Graphidaceae
- Genus: Graphis
- Species: G. tetralocularis

Binomial name
- Graphis tetralocularis C.Bock & M.Hauck (2005)

Species of lichen-forming fungus

Graphis tetralocularis is a species of crustose lichen in the family Graphidaceae. Found in Rwanda, it was formally described as a new species in 2005 by Christina Bock and Markus Hauck. The type specimen was collected by the first author from Akagera National Park at an altitude of 1,369 m (4,491 ft); here it was found growing on a twig of a Nuxia floribunda tree. It is only known to occur at the type locality, which is a dry forest dominated by the trees Nuxia floribunda, Haplocoelum gallense, and Strychnos usambarensis. The lichen has a thin, smooth, whitish grey to grey-green crustose thallus. The specific epithet tetralocularis refers to the unusual morphology of its four-chambered ascospores. Graphis tetralocularis contains trace amounts of atranorin, a secondary chemical that can be detected using the technique of thin-layer chromatography.

== See also ==
- List of Graphis (lichen) species
- List of lichens of Rwanda
