= Parmotrema afrocetratum =

Scientific classification
- Kingdom: Fungi
- Division: Ascomycota
- Class: Lecanoromycetes
- Order: Lecanorales
- Family: Parmeliaceae
- Genus: Parmotrema
- Species: P. afrocetratum

Binomial name
- Parmotrema afrocetratum Elix, Eb.Fischer & Killmann (2005)

Species of lichen

Parmotrema afrocetratum is a species of saxicolous (rock-dwelling) foliose lichen in the family Parmeliaceae. Described as new to science in 2005, it is found in Rwanda. It forms broad, leaf-like rosettes up to 10 cm across with grey-green upper surfaces and black undersides, growing directly on rock surfaces in landscaped areas at about 1750 metres elevation. The species is distinguished from similar lichens by its smooth margins without hair-like extensions and its distinctive flask-shaped reproductive spores.

== Taxonomy ==
Parmotrema afrocetratum was formally described in 2005 by John Elix, Eberhard Fischer, and Dorothee Killmann during their survey of Rwanda's poorly documented lichen funga. It belongs to the family Parmeliaceae, a large group of mostly foliose ("leaf-like") lichens that are especially diverse in tropical regions. The holotype was collected on rock outcrops in the grounds of the Institut de Recherche Scientifique et Technologique (IRST) at Butare, roughly 1750 m above sea level. The authors chose the epithet afrocetratum to signal both its African origin and its superficial resemblance to Parmotrema cetratum, a widespread pantropical species. Morphologically the new lichen differs from P. cetratum by lacking marginal cilia (hair-like extensions), having lobulate (small lobe-bearing) margins, and producing imperforate (un-holed) apothecia. It also has smaller ascospores and distinctly flask-shaped (sublageniform) conidia, whereas P. cetratum bears long, thread-like conidia. Chemotaxonomically P. afrocetratum is distinguished by atranorin in the cortex and salazinic acid as the principal medullary substance. These features, taken together, justify its recognition as a separate species within Parmotrema despite its overall similarity in habit to P. cetratum and P. latissimum.

== Description ==
The lichen forms loosely attached, foliose rosettes 8–10 cm across. Its lobes are relatively broad (5–15 mm), irregularly branched, and lie flat to gently waved; their margins are smooth or subtly lobulate but entirely without cilia. The upper surface ranges from grey to grey-green; when fresh it is shiny and maculate, and with age these maculae break into a fine network of cracks. No isidia (minute vegetative outgrowths) or soredia (powdery propagules) develop, so the species relies primarily on sexual and conidial reproduction. The medulla—the lichen's inner fungal layer—is white and reacts K+ (yellow then red), a spot test that betrays the presence of salazinic acid.

Below, the thallus is black and densely covered with rhizines—short, root-like holdfasts—that sometimes cluster near the lobe tips; a narrow brownish zone without rhizines often rims the margins. Apothecia (cup-shaped fruit-bodies) are scattered, 1–3 mm wide, and may sit flush with the thallus or rise slightly on a short stalk. Their discs start concave but become unevenly curved and brownish-glossy as they expand; unlike many in the genus they are never perforated at the centre. Ascospores are ellipsoid, 9–11 × 6–7 μm, while the plentiful pycnidia generate 5–7 × 1 μm sublageniform conidia. The chemical profile comprises atranorin and chloroatranorin in the cortex, with salazinic acid dominating the medulla, a combination that supports its placement within the salazinic acid group of Parmotrema species.

== Habitat and distribution ==
Parmotrema afrocetratum is known only from its type locality in southern Rwanda, where it grows saxicolously—that is, directly on rock surfaces—within an artificially landscaped park of open lawns and planted exotic trees adjoining the Ruhande Arboretum at Butare. The site lies at roughly 1750 m in a subtropical montane setting that experiences a mild but seasonally moist climate. Although the immediate habitat is anthropogenic, the surrounding region features a mosaic of natural montane forest and afroalpine vegetation, suggesting that the lichen could also inhabit nearby rocky clearings or forest edges. No additional populations have yet been recorded, so its broader distribution, ecological amplitude, and conservation status remain uncertain until further field surveys are undertaken. Parmotrema afrocetratum is one of 25 species of Parmotrema that have been documented in Rwanda.

== See also ==
- List of lichens of Rwanda
- List of Parmotrema species
