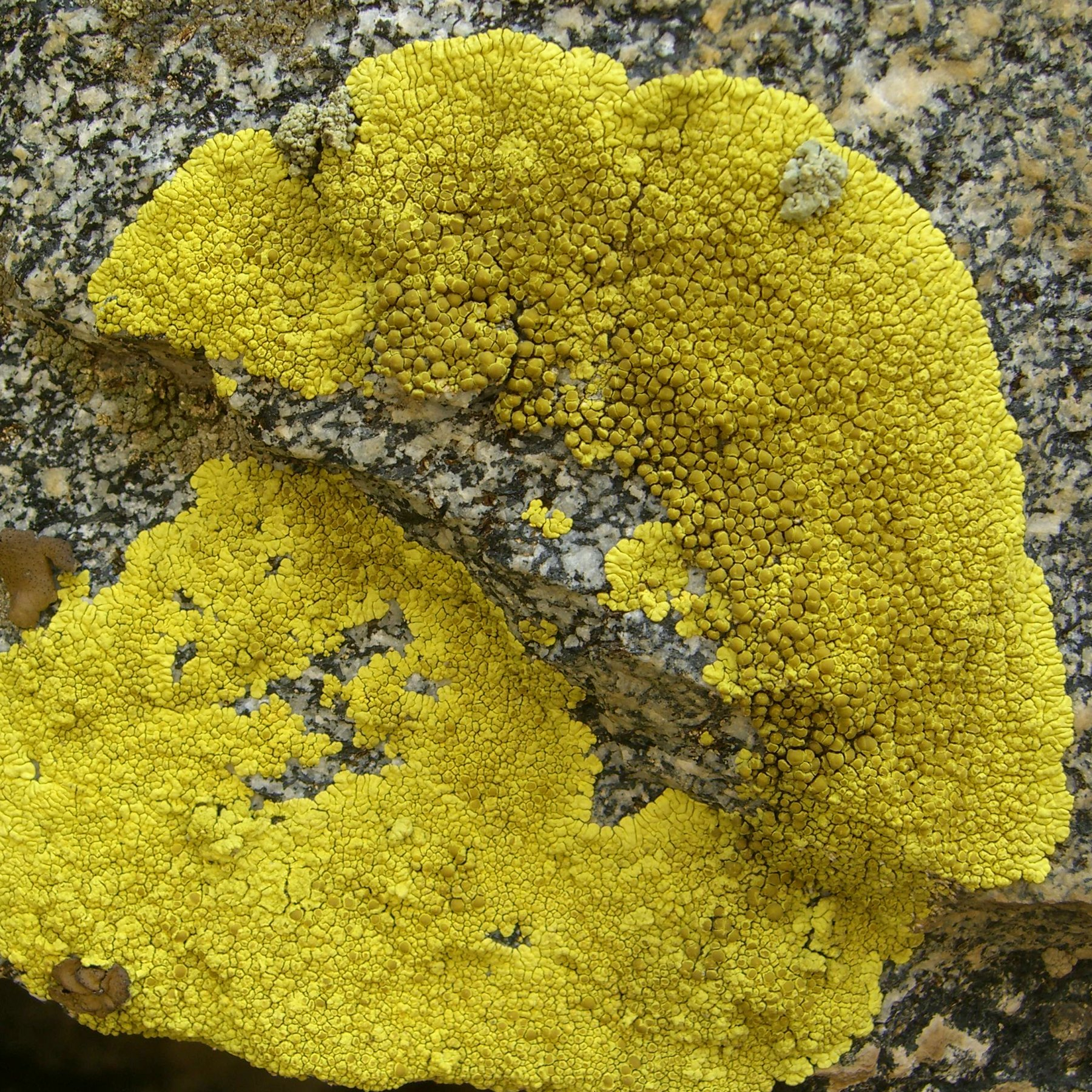
- Pleopsidium flavum

Scientific classification
- Kingdom: Fungi
- Division: Ascomycota
- Class: Lecanoromycetes
- Order: Acarosporales
- Family: Acarosporaceae
- Genus: Pleopsidium; Körb. (1855)

Species
- P. chlorophanum P. corrugatulum P. discurrens P. flavum P. gobiense P. oxytonum P. stenosporum P. tumidulum

Synonyms
- Gussonea Tornab. (1848); Acarosporomyces Cif. & Tomas.; Biatorellopsis C.W.Dodge (1965)

= Pleopsidium =

Genus of lichen-forming fungi

Pleopsidium is a genus of lichen-forming fungi in the family Acarosporaceae (order Acarosporales). The widespread genus was circumscribed by lichenologist Gustav Wilhelm Körber in 1855. After a 2025 revision of the genus, it comprises eight species.

== Taxonomy ==
In 2025, a taxonomic revision of the genus from China clarified species limits and expanded the genus's recognised diversity. Based on combined morphological, chemical and DNA sequence data, the authors identified a lineage of species lacking characteristic fatty acids and formally described two new taxa, Pleopsidium tumidulum and P. corrugatulum. These new species, together with P. gobiense, form a strongly supported clade distinct from other fatty acid‑containing members of the genus. The revision provides updated diagnostic characters and phylogenetic context to improve identification and classification of Pleopsidium species.

== Description ==
Pleopsidium is a genus of crustose lichens, typically forming small, patchy crusts divided into separate, block-like sections (areoles). Around the edges, these lichens may develop elongated or somewhat shaped (effigurate) lobes. The upper surface can be smooth or faintly wrinkled, and is most often a bright, vibrant yellow, though some specimens appear paler and slightly greenish. Beneath this surface layer, the photosynthetic partner is a green algal cell type known as chlorococcoid algae, arranged in a continuous layer. The upper cortex—the thin protective "skin"” on top—is made of small, closely packed cells (prosoplectenchymatous), but there is no lower cortex on the underside.

The reproductive structures, the apothecia, sit either on the surface or are slightly embedded. Initially they are flat, gradually becoming more dome-shaped over time. These structures are often surrounded by a distinctive thalline margin, especially in younger apothecia. The exposed centre (disc) of the apothecium varies from yellow to brownish-yellow. Inside, numerous thin, branched, and septate threads called paraphyses help support the spore-producing tissue. The asci (spore sacs) are club-shaped, contain over a hundred spores each, and have a characteristic dome at their tip. They display a blue reaction when treated with a combination of potassium (K) and iodine (I) chemicals. The spores themselves are ellipsoidal, colourless, and do not have internal divisions.

In addition to sexual reproduction through spores, Pleopsidium also reproduces via tiny, flask-shaped structures called pycnidia, which are hidden within the thallus. These produce small, ellipsoidal conidia (asexual spores) that narrow slightly at one end.

Chemically, Pleopsidium species contain rhizocarpic acid as well as specific fatty acids known as acaranoic and acarenoic acids. Ecologically, these lichens are typically found growing on rocks (saxicolous) in cool and humid environments, where they can often be identified by their distinctive bright yellow crusts.

== Species ==
- Pleopsidium chlorophanum (Wahlenb.) Arnold (1878)
- Pleopsidium corrugatulum C.C.Miao, Xin Yu Wang & Li S.Wang (2025)
- Pleopsidium discurrens (Zahlbr.) Obermayer (1996)
- Pleopsidium flavum (Bellardi) Körb. (1855)
- Pleopsidium gobiense (H.Magn.) Hafellner (1993)
- Pleopsidium oxytonum (Ach.) Rabenh. (1857)
- Pleopsidium stenosporum (Stizenb. ex Hasse) K.Knudsen (2011)
- Pleopsidium tumidulum M.Ai, Xin Yu Wang & Li S.Wang (2025)
