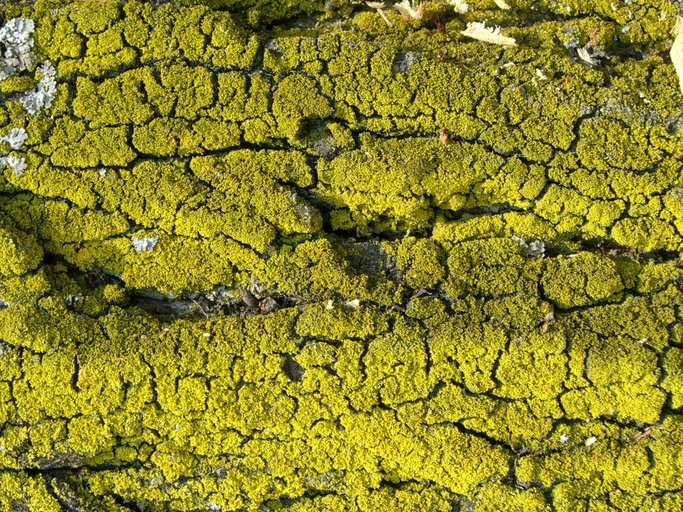
- Candelaria pacifica

Scientific classification
- Kingdom: Fungi
- Division: Ascomycota
- Class: Candelariomycetes
- Order: Candelariales
- Family: Candelariaceae
- Genus: Candelaria; A.Massal. (1852)

Type species
- Candelaria concolor (Dicks.) Stein (1879)

Species
- C. asiatica C. concolor C. crawfordii C. pacifica

Synonyms
- Placodium sect. Candelaria (A.Massal.) Branth & Rostr. (1869); Xanthoria sect. Candelaria (A.Massal.) Th.Fr. (1871); Lecanora sect. Candelaria (A.Massal.) Cromb. (1894)

= Candelaria (lichen) =

Genus of lichens

Candelaria is a genus of lichen-forming fungi in the family Candelariaceae. The genus was circumscribed by Italian lichenologist Abramo Bartolommeo Massalongo in 1852.

== Species ==
As of November 2025, Species Fungorum (in the Catalogue of Life) accepts seven species of Candelaria:

- Candelaria asiatica D.Liu & J.S.Hur (2018) – South Korea
- Candelaria concolor (Dicks.) Arnold (1879)
- Candelaria coudercii Harm (1910)
- Candelaria crawfordii (Müll.Arg.) P.M.Jørg. & D.J.Galloway (1992)
- Candelaria fibrosa (Fr.) Müll.Arg. (1887)
- Candelaria murrayi Poelt (1970)
- Candelaria pacifica (M.Westb. & Arup (2011)) – Europe; North America; South America
