= Syncesia indica =

Scientific classification
- Kingdom: Fungi
- Division: Ascomycota
- Class: Arthoniomycetes
- Order: Arthoniales
- Family: Roccellaceae
- Genus: Syncesia
- Species: S. indica

Binomial name
- Syncesia indica S.Joshi & Upreti (2011)

Species of lichen-forming fungus

Syncesia indica is a species of corticolous (bark-dwelling) crustose lichen in the family Roccellaceae. Found in southern India, it was formally described as a new species in 2011 by Santosh Joshi and Dalip Kumar Upreti. The type was collected from an evergreen forest in the Shradighat region of Karnataka.

== Description ==
The thallus of Syncesia indica is crustose and grows on bark (corticolous). It forms a greyish white to pale grey crust with a slightly felted (tomentose) surface that becomes cracked (rimose), and it produces rhizomorph-like structures. The thallus is about 140–300 μm thick. The fruiting bodies are stromatoid and sit directly on the thallus (sessile), forming compound structures (synascomata) up to about 3 mm across. The hypothecium extends down into the medulla. The ascospores are colourless (hyaline), fusiform, and 3-septate, measuring 15–22 × 2–4 μm. The thallus contains protocetraric acid as a major secondary metabolite and trace amounts of roccellic acid.
