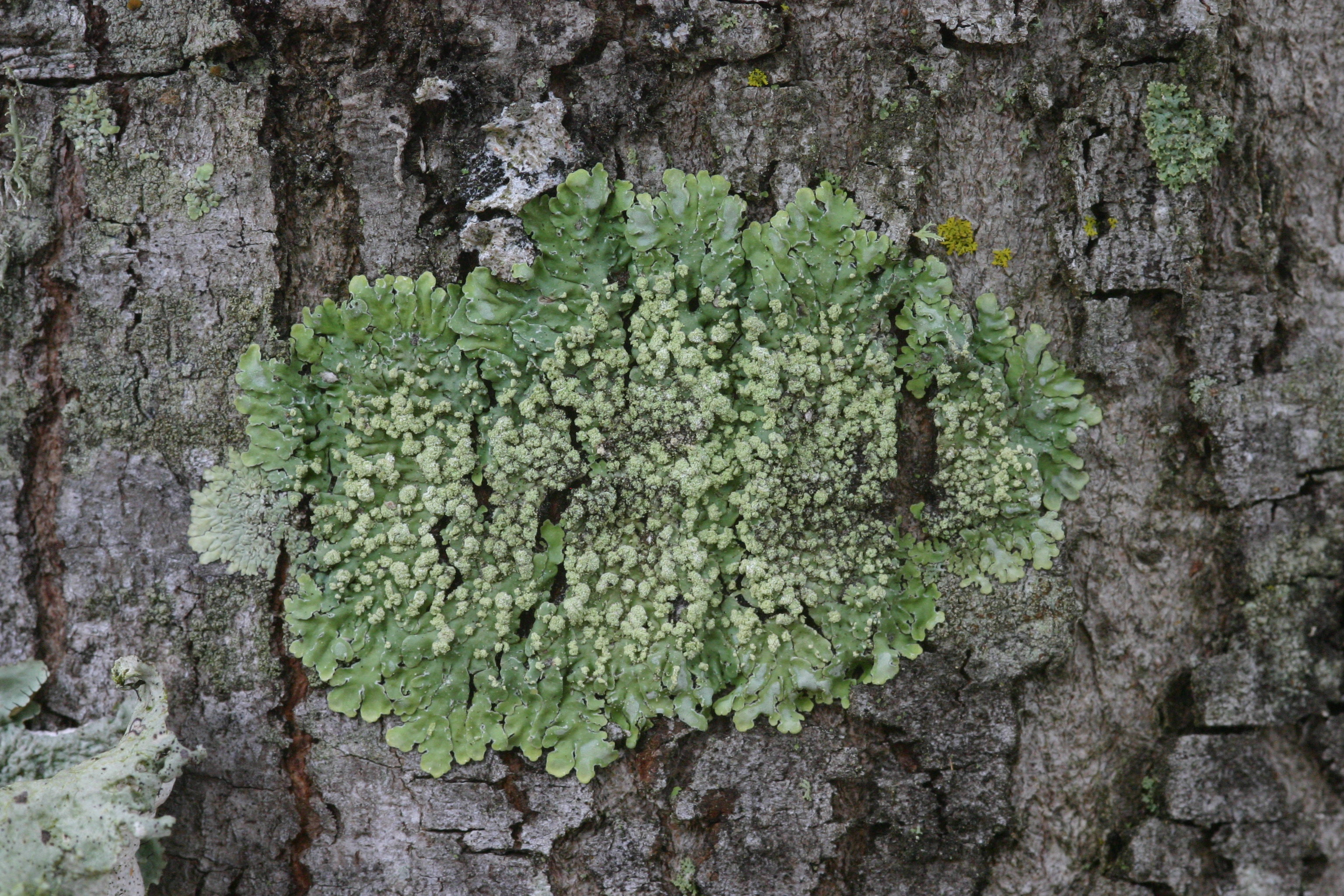

Conservation status
- Apparently Secure (NatureServe)

Scientific classification
- Kingdom: Fungi
- Division: Ascomycota
- Class: Lecanoromycetes
- Order: Caliciales
- Family: Caliciaceae
- Genus: Dirinaria
- Species: D. picta

Binomial name
- Dirinaria picta (Sw.) Clem. & Shear

Synonyms
- Dimelaena picta (Sw.) Trevis.; Hagenia picta (Sw.) Bagl.; Lichen pictus Sw.; Lobaria picta (Sw.) Raeusch.; Parmelia picta (Sw.) Ach.; Parmelia plumosa Taylor; Physcia picta (Sw.) Nyl.; Physcia picta f. erythrocardia (Tuck.) J.W. Thomson; Physcia plumosa (Taylor) Nyl.; Pyxine picta (Sw.) Tuck.; Pyxine picta var. erythrocardia Tuck.; Squamaria picta (Sw.) Ach.; Physcia erythrocardia (Tuck.) Vain.

= Dirinaria picta =

Species of fungus

Dirinaria picta is a species of lichen within the family Caliciaceae, classified under the order Caliciales in the class Lecanoromycetes of the division Ascomycota.

== Etymology ==
The specific epithet "picta" means "painted or variegated".

== Description ==
Dirinaria picta forms suborbicular to spreading thalli, closely attached to the substrate, and can be saxicolous or corticolous. The lobes are stellate-radiating, contiguous, and pinnatifid to multifid, typically measuring 1-1.5 mm wide. They are generally discrete at the periphery, with acute to rounded apices that are not flabellate confluent.

The upper surface is glaucous-white to pale grey, smooth, and sometimes faintly pruinose at the apices. Soralia are laminal, capitate, and sparsely distributed, with soredia that are fine and powdery. The lower surface is black. Apothecia are occasionally present, with a disc that is black and subpedicellate. Ascospores are biseriate and measure 12-21 × 5-9 μm.

== Distribution ==
Dirinaria picta is distributed in various locations, including the Kermadec Islands, Bangladesh, and several regions in New Zealand. It is also widely recorded from tropical areas from both hemispheres.

== Habitat ==
This species is typically found on the bark of various tree species, including Rhopalostylis sapida, orange trees, Kunzea spp., Leptospermum scoparium, and Metrosideros excelsa. It also grows on fenceposts in open grassland areas.

== Similar taxa ==
Dirinaria picta can be distinguished from Dirinaria applanata by its pinnately or subpinnately divided lobes, which are discrete at the periphery, with narrow to oblong apices. Additionally, the thallus of D. picta is less wrinkled-plicate compared to that of D. applanata.

== Substrate ==
The species Dirinaria picta typically thrives on bark surfaces, a habitat known as corticolous.
