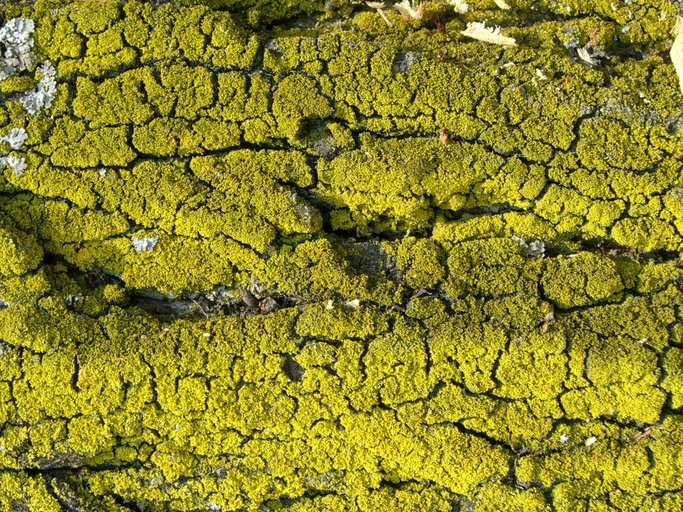

Scientific classification
- Kingdom: Fungi
- Division: Ascomycota
- Class: Candelariomycetes
- Order: Candelariales
- Family: Candelariaceae
- Genus: Candelaria
- Species: C. pacifica

Binomial name
- Candelaria pacifica M.Westb. & Arup (2011)

= Candelaria pacifica =

Species of lichen-forming fungus

Candelaria pacifica is a widely distributed corticolous (bark-dwelling), leprose lichen. It was formally described as a species in 2011. It is a very small, yellow, bark-dwelling lichen that is often confused with the similar Candelaria concolor but differs in having eight-spored asci, lacking a lower cortex, and producing fewer rhizines. The species is widespread in western North America and has become increasingly recognized across Europe, where herbarium revisions have shown that many specimens previously identified as C. concolor belong to this species. It grows mainly on nutrient-rich bark of deciduous trees in open or semi-open settings.

== Taxonomy ==
Candelaria pacifica was formally described as a distinct species in 2011 by Martin Westberg and Ulf Arup. Before that, material now referred to this species had often been misidentified as Candelaria concolor, and some European collections had also been placed under Candelariella reflexa. In an earlier ITS-based phylogenetic study of the Candelariaceae, it was already included as an undescribed taxon distinct from C. concolor because it had eight-spored asci and lacked a lower cortex. Later revisions of herbarium material in Germany and Austria showed that a number of older specimens named as C. concolor in fact belonged to C. pacifica.

== Description ==
Candelaria pacifica is a very small, yellow, foliose lichen whose individual thalli are usually up to about 5 mm wide, although neighbouring thalli may merge into much larger patches on bark. The thallus is typically squamulose rather than neatly rosette-forming, with narrow lobes 0.1–0.6 mm wide that give it a somewhat shrubby appearance; many specimens consist largely of minute blastidia with only a few weakly developed lobes. The upper surface is yellow (with shades of lemon, orange, or green), smooth, with a cortex up to 45 μm thick. The inner tissue (medulla) is white and thin, and the underside is whitish to greenish, lacking a true lower cortex and therefore appearing pale and cobwebby under magnification. Attachment structures are few and delicate, not the long, conspicuous rhizines typical of C. concolor. Soredia form on the lobe tips and margins, including on the lower side, and the thallus margins commonly produce abundant blastidia.

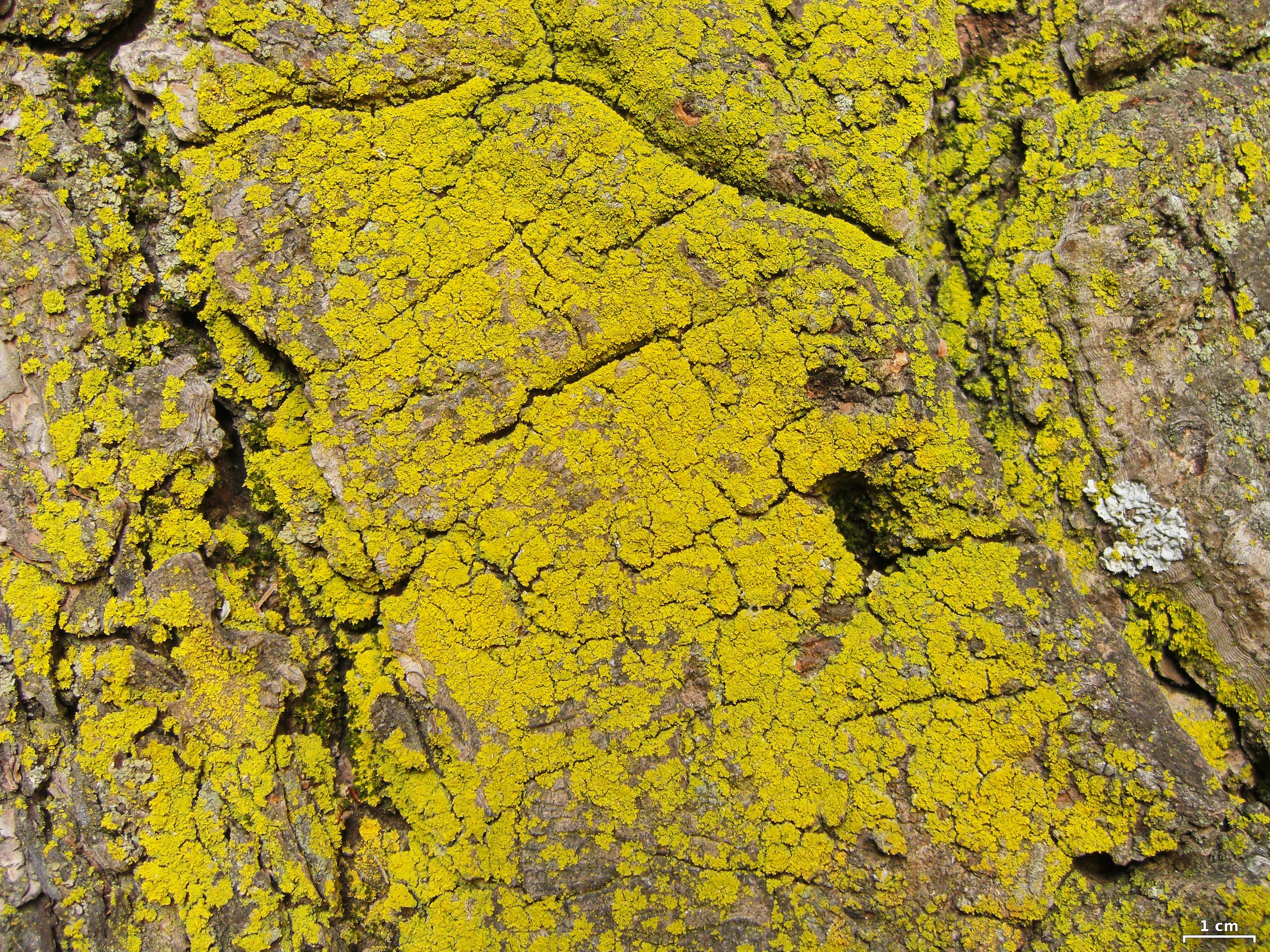
Found on Mount San Antonio, southern California; scale: 1 cm

Apothecia are common in some populations but appear uncommon in European material; they reach up to 1 mm in diameter. The asci are club-shaped (clavate) and eight-spored — a key distinction from C. concolor, which has many-spored asci. The ascospores are colorless and ellipsoid, containing lipid droplets. Pycnidia appear on the surface as orange warts, producing ellipsoid conidia. Standard spot tests (K, C, KC, P) are all negative on the surface and medulla.

=== Similar species ===
Candelaria pacifica is most easily confused with Candelaria concolor, which it closely resembles in overall appearance. The two are best separated by ascus spore number (eight in C. pacifica versus many in C. concolor), the absence of a lower cortex in C. pacifica, and the presence of soredia on the underside of its lobes. The recognition of C. pacifica as a distinct species prompted herbarium revisions across Europe, which revealed that C. concolor – previously thought to be common in many countries — is in fact considerably rarer than had been assumed.

== Habitat and distribution ==
Candelaria pacifica was described from California, and it is now known to be widespread in western North America, from the Sonoran Desert north to Washington and Idaho and into British Columbia. It has also been reported from South America. In Europe, the species has been recorded from Scandinavia, France, Belgium, Luxembourg, the Netherlands, Germany, Austria, Switzerland, Poland, Estonia, Russia, and Turkey. It has also been found in Iran.

The lichen grows mainly on the nutrient-rich bark of deciduous trees in open or semi-open habitats such as roadside plantings, cemeteries, and park-like settings, often on free-standing trees or at forest edges; it occasionally occurs on conifers and can also colonise dead bark and detached wood. Recorded host trees include lime, oak, ash, hornbeam, elm, horse chestnut, maple, birch, pear, poplar, walnut, and other broadleaved species. The algal partner is a green alga housed within the thallus.

Field studies in Germany found it common and apparently not threatened in the north-west German lowlands, especially on old lime trees in settled areas, though in the Aachen region it remained less frequent than C. concolor. In Upper Austria, revisions of herbarium collections showed that many specimens previously filed under C. concolor actually belonged to C. pacifica, suggesting the species is more widespread than older records indicate.
