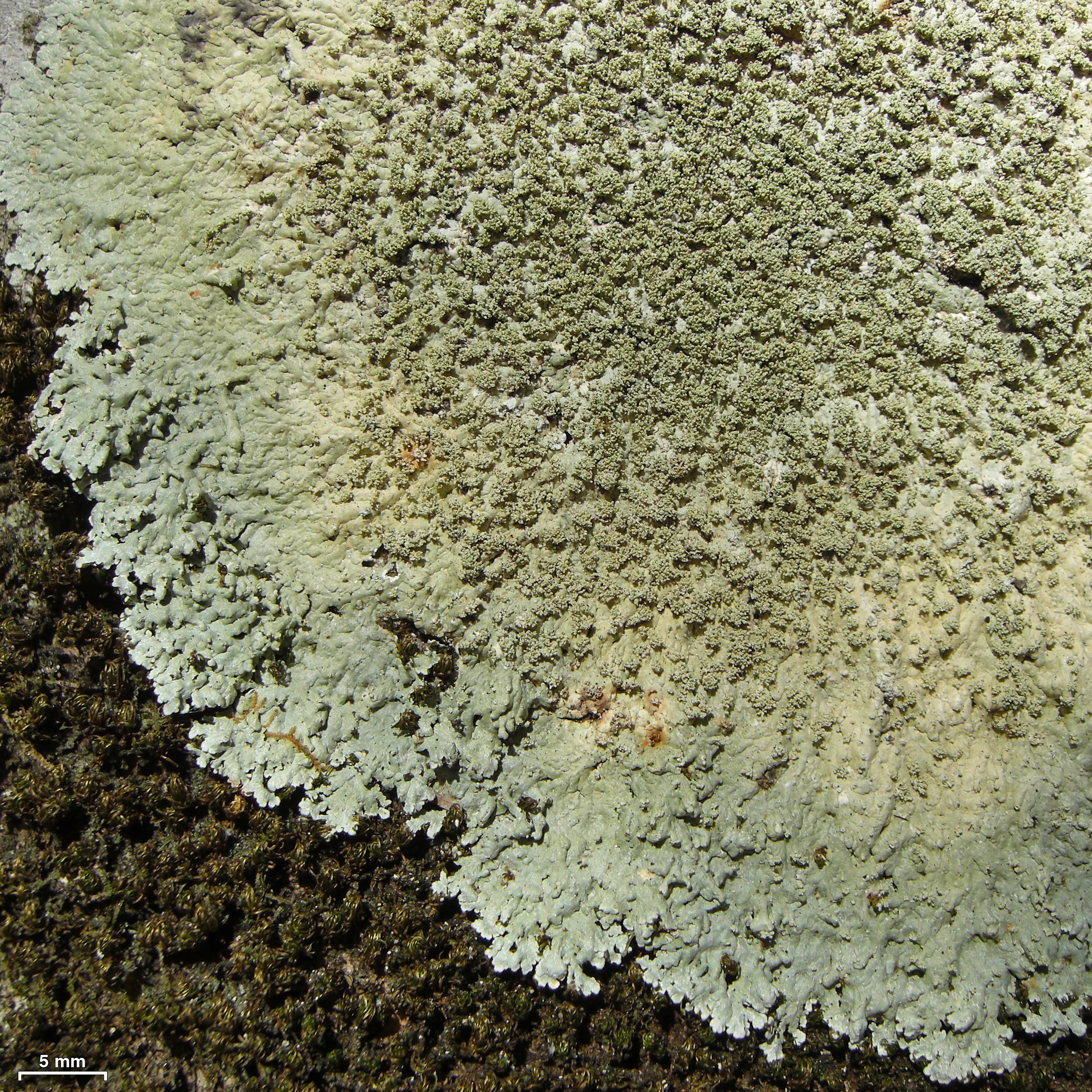

Conservation status
- Apparently Secure (NatureServe)

Scientific classification
- Kingdom: Fungi
- Division: Ascomycota
- Class: Lecanoromycetes
- Order: Caliciales
- Family: Caliciaceae
- Genus: Dirinaria
- Species: D. aegialita

Binomial name
- Dirinaria aegialita (Afzel. ex Ach.) B.J. Moore

Synonyms
- Parmelia aegialita Afzel. ex Ach.; Lecanora aegiliata (Afzel. ex Ach.) Ach.; Physcia aegialita (Afzel. ex Ach.) Nyl.; Hagenia aegialita (Afzel. ex Ach.) Bagl.; Lecanora aegialita (Afzel. ex Ach.) Ach.; Parmelia aegiliata Ach.; Physcia aegiliata (Afzel. ex Ach.) Nyl.

= Dirinaria aegialita =

Species of lichen

Dirinaria aegialita is a species of foliose lichen in the family Caliciaceae. It is found in tropical regions around the world, with scattered occurrences in subtropical North America.

== Morphology ==
The lichen forms loosely appressed thalli, reaching diameters of up to 12 cm. Its thallus structure is pinnately or subpinnately lobate, featuring radiating and confluent lobes. Typically measuring between 0.2 and 3 mm wide, these lobes present a flat or convex profile, often displaying concavity towards the tips and occasionally exhibiting a distinctive flabellate shape.

The upper surface of the thallus showcases a spectrum of colors, including various shades of gray, bluish gray, almost white, or stramineous hues. This surface may display a slight pruinose texture or lack a pruina entirely, transitioning into soredia over time. Notably, the presence of polysidiangia is observed, emerging from isidia-like outgrowths, which subsequently rupture to reveal soredia, ultimately forming an apically crateriform appearance.

Distinct pseudocyphellae, both laminal and marginal, are typically confined to the peripheral regions of the lobes, with occasional formations of reticulately confluent patterns. The medulla, predominantly white, often presents an orange hue at its lowest part, particularly towards the lobe tips. In contrast, the lower surface adopts a central black coloration, gradually fading to paler tones towards the lobe tips, and is described as erhizinate.

While apothecia are infrequent, they are found laminal on the thallus, measuring between 0.5 and 1.5 mm wide, featuring a black, slightly grayish pruinose disc. Ascospores, crucial for reproductive structures, are brown, 1-septate, and ellipsoid, with dimensions ranging from 16–22 x 7–9 μm. Pycnidia, immersed in warts, contain bacilliform conidia measuring 4–5 x 0.8–1 μm.

== Chemistry ==
In spot test, the upper cortex demonstrates positive reactions to K+ yellow while exhibiting negative reactions to C−, KC−, and P+ yellow. Conversely, the medulla, encompassing both upper and lower parts, shows negative responses to K−, C−, KC−, and P−. Secondary metabolites identified include atranorin within the upper cortex, accompanied by divaricatic acid and a few terpenes in low concentration within the medulla.

== Ecology and distribution ==
Dirinaria aegialita thrives within a diverse ecological range, commonly found on bark, wood, and rocks, spanning from sea level to the perimeters of montane rain forests. Its distribution encompasses all tropical regions of both hemispheres, with occasional sightings in the eastern regions of subtropical North America. Particularly prominent within the Sonoran region, it exhibits a notable prevalence in thorn forests, desert transition areas, and sporadically within oak-conifer forests of Baja California, Baja California Sur, Chihuahua, Sinaloa, and Sonora.
