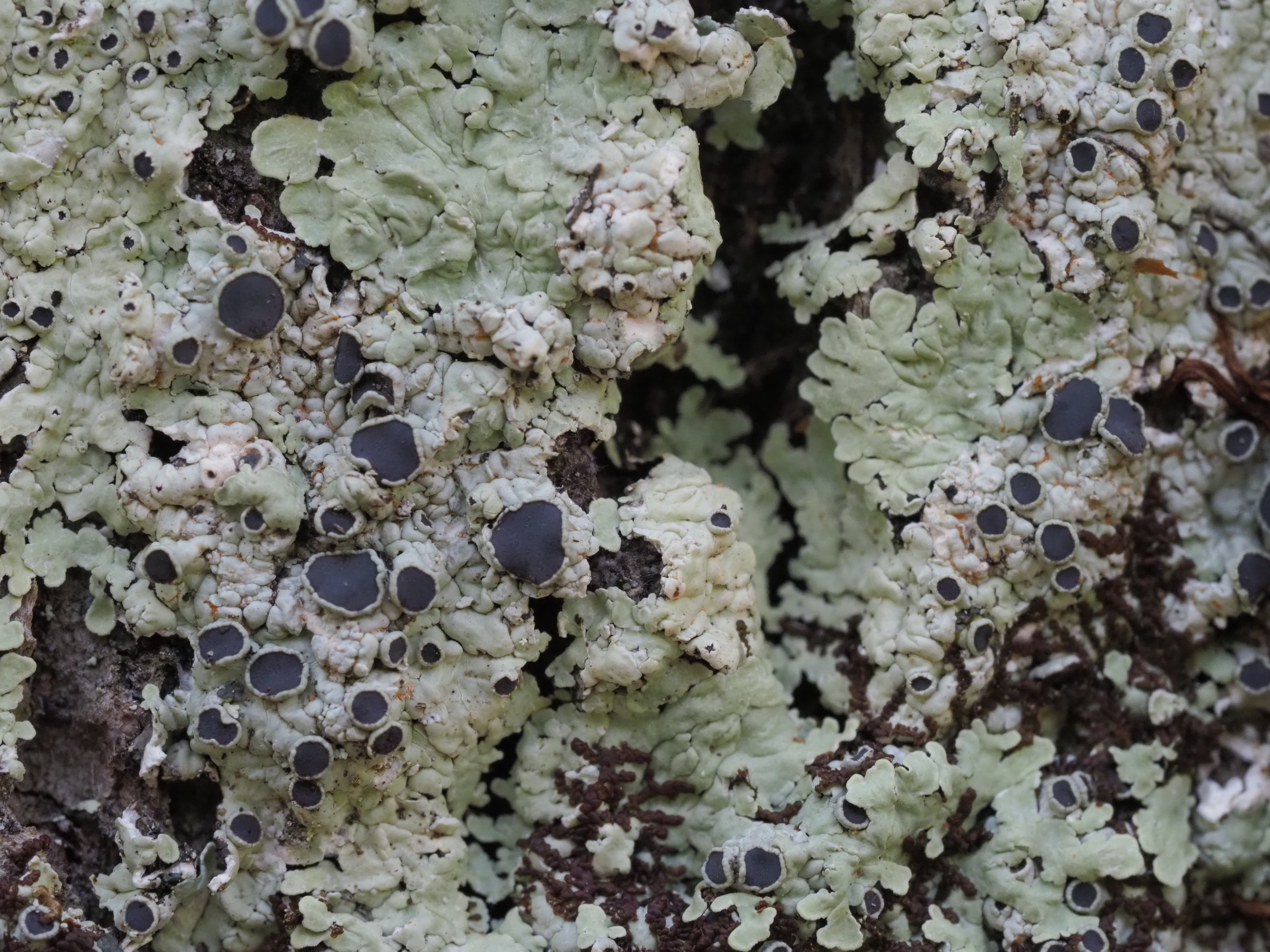

Scientific classification
- Kingdom: Fungi
- Division: Ascomycota
- Class: Lecanoromycetes
- Order: Caliciales
- Family: Caliciaceae
- Genus: Dirinaria
- Species: D. confluens

Binomial name
- Dirinaria confluens D.D.Awasthi

Synonyms
- Dimelaena confluens (Fr.) Trevis.; Parmelia confluens Fr.; Physcia confluens (Fr.) Nyl.

= Dirinaria confluens =

Species of fungus

Dirinaria confluens is a species of foliose lichen belonging to the genus Dirinaria within the family Caliciaceae. It was originally described by D.D.Awasthi in 1975.

== Morphology ==
Dirinaria confluens exhibits a foliose thallus that ranges from loosely appressed to firmly agglutinated. The lobes are pinnately or subpinnately lobate, radiating, and sometimes confluent. They are typically flat or convex but may be concave towards the tips. The upper surface varies in color from gray, lead-gray, bluish-gray, yellowish gray, to almost white, often with a punctiform or powdery white pruina. Pseudocyphellae are often distinct, marginal, and laminal, while the medulla is white, sometimes with an orange hue towards the tips. The lower surface is black in the center and paler towards the tips, lacking rhizines. Apothecia are common, laminal on the thallus, with jet-black discs. Ascospores are brown, 1-septate, narrowly ellipsoid, measuring 15-19 x 6-7 μm. Pycnidia are immersed in warts, producing bacilliform conidia.

== Chemistry ==
Spot tests conducted on the upper cortex exhibit a positive reaction to K+ yellow, while showing negative reactions to C−, KC−, and a positive reaction to P+ yellow. Conversely, the medulla demonstrates negative reactions to K−, C−, KC−, and P−. Secondary metabolites present include atranorin in the upper cortex, and divaricatic acid along with a few terpenes in low concentration in the medulla.

== Substrate and ecology ==
Dirinaria confluens inhabits various substrates, including bark, wood, and rocks, spanning from sea level to the boundaries of montane rain forests.

=== Distribution ===
The species is distributed across all tropical regions of both hemispheres, with occasional collections noted from subtropical areas of Japan. Dirinaria confluens is predominantly found in thorn forests and areas transitioning from desert environments in Baja California, Baja California Sur, Sinaloa, and Sonora.
