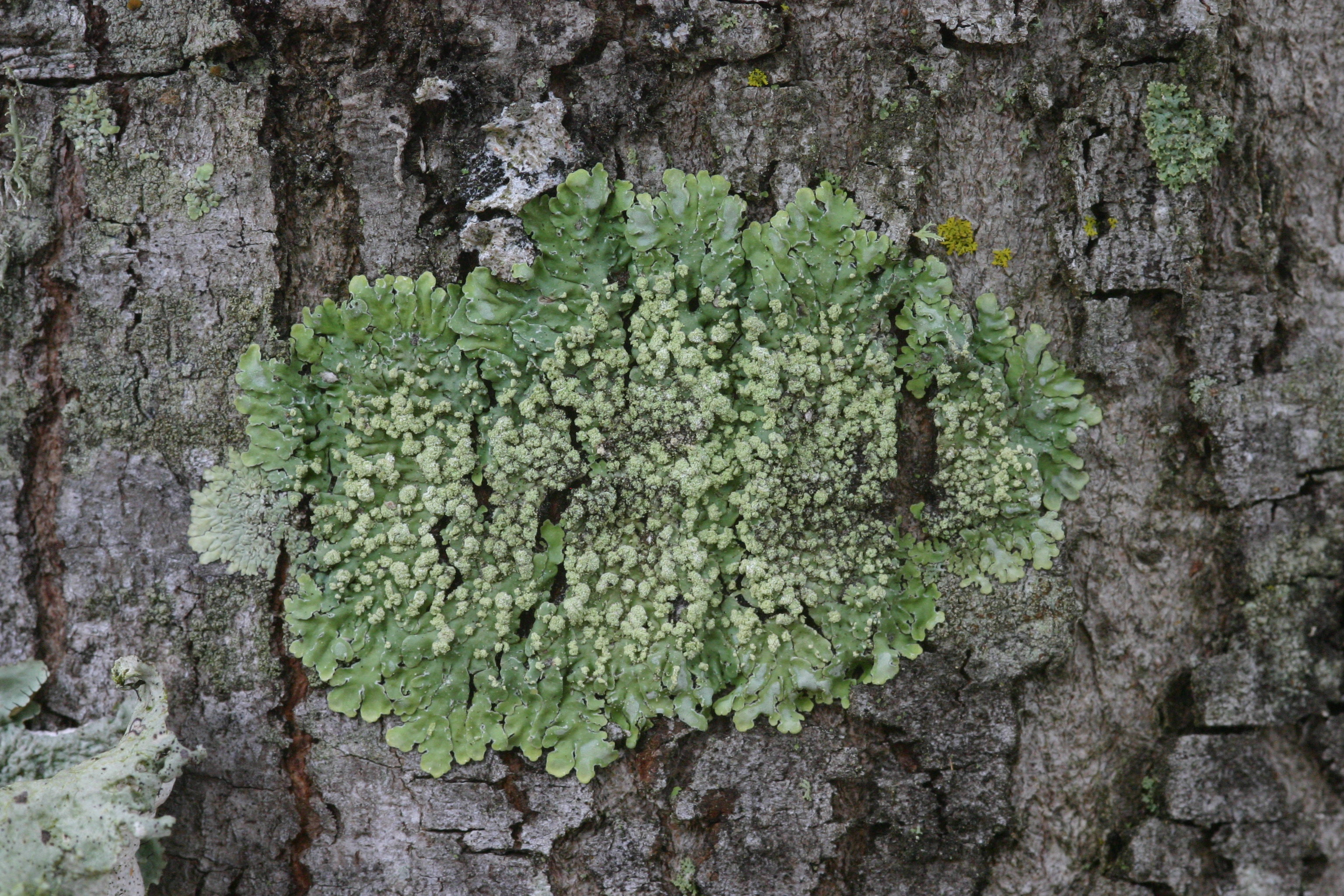
- Dirinaria picta

Scientific classification
- Domain: Eukaryota
- Kingdom: Fungi
- Division: Ascomycota
- Class: Lecanoromycetes
- Order: Caliciales
- Family: Caliciaceae
- Genus: Dirinaria (Tuck.) Clem. (1909)

Type species
- Dirinaria picta (Sw.) Schaer. ex Clem.

Synonyms
- Pyxine sect. Dirinaria Tuck. (1877)

= Dirinaria =

Genus of lichens in the family Caliciaceae

Dirinaria is a genus of lichenized fungi in the family Caliciaceae. The genus has a widespread distribution, especially in tropical regions, and contains about 35 species.

== Species ==
- Dirinaria aegialita (Afzel. ex Ach.) B.J.Moore (1968)
- Dirinaria applanata (Fée) D.D.Awasthi (1970)
- Dirinaria aspera (H.Magn.) D.D.Awasthi (1964)
- Dirinaria batavica D.D.Awasthi (1975)
- Dirinaria complicata D.D.Awasthi (1975)
- Dirinaria confluens (Fr.) D.D.Awasthi (1975)
- Dirinaria consimilis (Stirt.) D.D.Awasthi (1970)
- Dirinaria flava (Müll. Arg.) C.W.Dodge (1971)
- Dirinaria flavida (B.de Lesd.) Kalb & Schumm (2019)
- Dirinaria frostii (Tuck.) Hale & W.L.Culb. (1970)
- Dirinaria melanoclina (C.Knight) D.D.Awasthi (1975)
- Dirinaria minuta Kalb (2001)
- Dirinaria neotropica Kalb (2004)
- Dirinaria picta (Sw.) Clem. & Shear (1931)
- Dirinaria pruinosa Kalb (2001)
- Dirinaria purpurascens (Vain.) B.J.Moore (1968)
- Dirinaria sekikaica Elix (2008)
- Dirinaria subconfluens D.D.Awasthi (1975)
