= Syncesia madagascariensis =

Scientific classification
- Kingdom: Fungi
- Division: Ascomycota
- Class: Arthoniomycetes
- Order: Arthoniales
- Family: Roccellaceae
- Genus: Syncesia
- Species: S. madagascariensis

Binomial name
- Syncesia madagascariensis Ertz, Killmann, Razafindr., Sérus. & Eb.Fisch. (2010)

Species of lichen

Syncesia madagascariensis is a rare species of crustose lichen in the family Roccellaceae. It is found in Madagascar. This lichen forms large, continuous patches up to 15 cm across on tree bark, with a creamy surface that becomes increasingly cracked with age and distinctive flattened, disc-shaped fruiting bodies that show radiating ridge patterns. It is known only from montane forests near Ambositra at 1705 metres elevation, where it grows on tree trunks in forests dominated by myrtle family trees.

== Taxonomy ==
The lichen was formally described as a new species in 2010 by Damien Ertz, Dorothee Killmann, Tahina Razafindrahaja, Emmanuël Sérusiaux, and Eberhard Fischer. The type specimen was collected south of Ambositra in Ankazomivady (Ambalamanakana) at an altitude of 1,705 m (5,594 ft). It is only known to occur at the type locality, where it grows on tree trunks in a montane forest of mostly Myrtaceae and Syzygium.

== Description ==
Syncesia madagascariensis is a crustose lichen that forms extensive, adherent patches on tree bark in Madagascar's montane forests. The thallus (lichen body) develops as large, continuous colonies reaching up to 15 centimetres in diameter, with a characteristic matt, rimose surface that becomes increasingly cracked and fissured with age. The surface texture ranges from nearly smooth to minutely subgranular, presenting a creamy colouration with subtle greenish tones and exhibiting hydrophobic (water-repellent) properties.

The thallus architecture is relatively robust, measuring 50–250 micrometres (μm) in thickness, with a homogeneous, hyphae-dominated internal structure. The cortical layer is densely populated with small crystalline deposits that readily dissolve when treated with potassium hydroxide solution. The photobiont layer contains Trentepohlia algae—the photosynthetic partner essential to the lichen symbiosis—appearing as pale to dark brown cells measuring 14–20 μm in diameter.

The reproductive structures (ascomata) represent one of the species' most diagnostic features. These initially develop as solitary, rounded perithecia but mature into distinctly flattened, discoid structures measuring 0.5–1.0 mm across. The mature ascomata show prominent stromatoid organization, characterized by radiating ridge-like formations that create a distinctive reticulate pattern across the surface. Each ascoma has a black hypothecium (the layer beneath the spore-bearing surface) and produces protocetraric acid within the thalline walls—a secondary metabolite that can be detected through thin-layer chromatography. Protocetraric acid is the major secondary metabolite, along with traces of roccellic acid.

The ascospores (sexual spores) are particularly distinctive, being 5-septate (divided into six compartments by five internal cross-walls, or septa), hyaline (colourless), and measuring roughly 50–57.5 × 68–80 μm. This septation pattern is taxonomically significant, as it distinguishes S. madagascariensis from most other Syncesia species, which typically produce 3-septate ascospores.
