= Everniopsis =

Scientific classification
- Domain: Eukaryota
- Kingdom: Fungi
- Division: Ascomycota
- Class: Lecanoromycetes
- Order: Lecanorales
- Family: Parmeliaceae
- Genus: Everniopsis; Nyl. (1860)
- Species: E. trulla

Binomial name
- Everniopsis trulla (Ach.) Nyl. (1860)

Synonyms
- Genus: Parmelia sect. Everniopsis (Nyl.) Stizenb. (1862); Hendrickxia P.A.Duvign. (1942); Species: Parmelia trulla Ach. (1803); Borrera trulla (Ach.) Ach. (1810); Evernia trulla (Ach.) Nyl. (1858)

Single-species genus of lichen

Everniopsis is a fungal genus in the family Parmeliaceae. It consists of a single species, the bark-dwelling lichen Everniopsis trulla, which occurs in Africa and South America.

== Systematics ==
Everniopsis trulla was first formally described by Erik Acharius in 1803 with the name Parmelia trulla. The type material, collected in Peru, is kept at the herbarium of the Department of Botany at the Swedish Museum of Natural History. William Nylander transferred the taxon to the new genus Everniopsis in 1860. Ernst Stizenberger thought that Everniopsis should be a section of genus Parmelia, and proposed this classification in an 1862 publication. The genus Hendrickxia, circumscribed by Belgian botanist Paul Auguste Duvigneaud in 1942 with Hendrickxia pseudoreticulata as the type species, has been folded into synonymy with Everniopsis.

Molecular phylogenetic analysis indicates that Everniopsis is in the Psiloparmelioid clade of the family Parmeliaceae, along with the genus Psiloparmelia.

== Description ==
Evernipiopsis has a thallus attached by a holdfast to its substrate. The lobes comprising the thallus are linearly elongated, split into two at the ends, and longitudinally grooved (canaliculate). The thallus lacks both rhizines (root-like structures) and cilia (short, eyelash-like hair). Its conidia (asexual spores) are rod-shaped with swellings at each end (bifusiform). It produces ascospores that are ellipsoid in shape, measuring 12–16 by 7–10 μm. The superficially similar genus Everniastrum, in contrast, does not have a holdfast, it does have both rhizines and cilia, and its conidia are cylindrical.

Secondary chemicals that have been identified from Everniopsis trulla include usnic acid, atranorin, and ethyl haematommate.

== Habitat and distribution ==
Everniopsis trulla is a corticolous lichen and occurs in Africa and South America. On the latter continent, the lichen occurs at high elevations from Mexico south to northern Chile.
