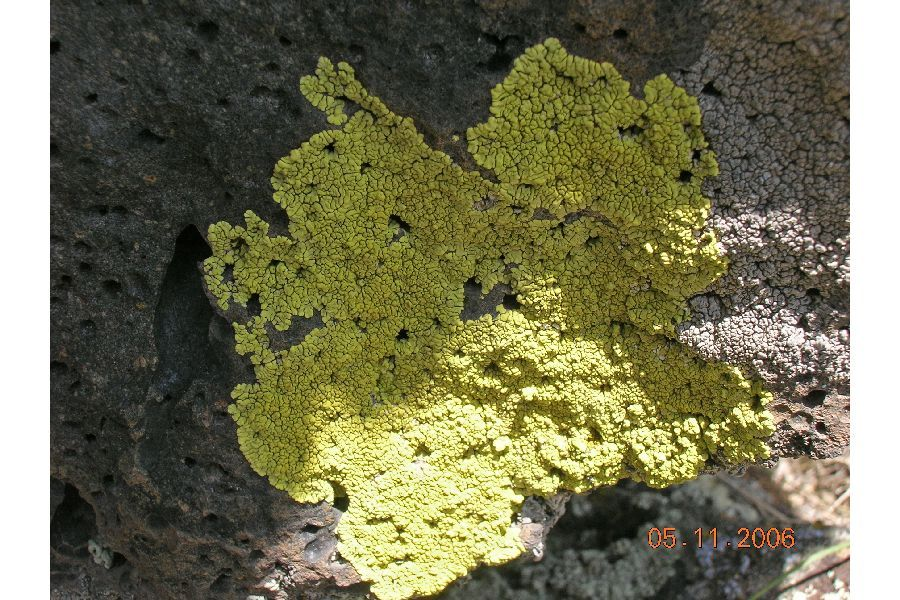

Conservation status
- Secure (NatureServe)

Scientific classification
- Kingdom: Fungi
- Division: Ascomycota
- Class: Lecanoromycetes
- Order: Acarosporales
- Family: Acarosporaceae
- Genus: Pleopsidium
- Species: P. chlorophanum

Binomial name
- Pleopsidium chlorophanum (Wahlenb.) Zopf (1895)

Synonyms
- List: Parmelia chlorophana Wahlenb. (1803); Lecanora chlorophana (Wahlenb.) Ach. (1810); Lichen chlorophanus (Wahlenb.) Wahlenb. (1812); Lichen peltatus * chlorophana (Wahlenb.) Lam. (1813); Parmelia flava var. chlorophana (Wahlenb.) Schaer. (1840); Gussonea chlorophana (Wahlenb.) Tornab. (1848); Placodium chlorophanum (Wahlenb.) Flot. (1849); Lecanora flava var. chlorophana (Wahlenb.) Schaer. (1850); Acarospora chlorophana (Wahlenb.) A.Massal. (1852); Teloschistes chlorophanus (Wahlenb.) Norman (1852); Pleopsidium flavum f. chlorophanum (Wahlenb.) Körb. (1855); Gussonea flava var. chlorophana (Wahlenb.) Anzi (1860); Myriospora chlorophana (Wahlenb.) Hepp (1860); Acarospora flava var. chlorophana (Wahlenb.) Stein (1879); Acarosporomyces chlorophanus (Wahlenb.) Cif. & Tomas. (1953)

= Pleopsidium chlorophanum =

Species of lichen-forming fungus

Pleopsidium chlorophanum (gold cobblestone lichen) is a distinctively colored, bright lemon-yellow to chartreuse crustose lichen, which favors dry arctic or alpine sandstone cliffs and boulders. It is a rare alpine lichen in Europe. It is in the genus Pleopsidium of the family Acarosporaceae.

This lichen is one of the few species able to survive at high altitudes in Antarctica, at altitudes of up to 2,000 metres (6,600 ft). It is able to cope with high UV, low temperatures and dryness. In its Antarctic habitat, it can be found on the surface, but it is mainly found in cracks, where just a small amount of scattered light reaches it. This is probably an adaptive behaviour to protect it from UV light and desiccation. It remains metabolically active in temperatures down to −20 °C (−4 °F), and can absorb small amounts of liquid water in an environment with ice and snow.

It is of especial interest for astrobiology since this is one of the most Mars-like environments on the Earth. In a 34-day experiment when placed in a Mars simulation chamber, it continued to photosynthesize, and it adapted to Mars conditions and even adapted physiologically by increasing its photosynthetic activity, and producing new growth.

It is similar to Acarospora schleicheri, which grows on soil (terricolous lichen) and rarely on rock, and to Pleopsidium flavum. that grows in high elevations (montane to alpine) on vertical or overhanging hard felsic rock (e.g. granite) in western North America.

Its thallus grows in a circular, outwardly radiating pattern (placodioid), with 1 mm wide lobed edges. It differs from Pleopsidium flavum in having a smooth, smaller squamulose thallus and larger apothecia (spore producing structures).
