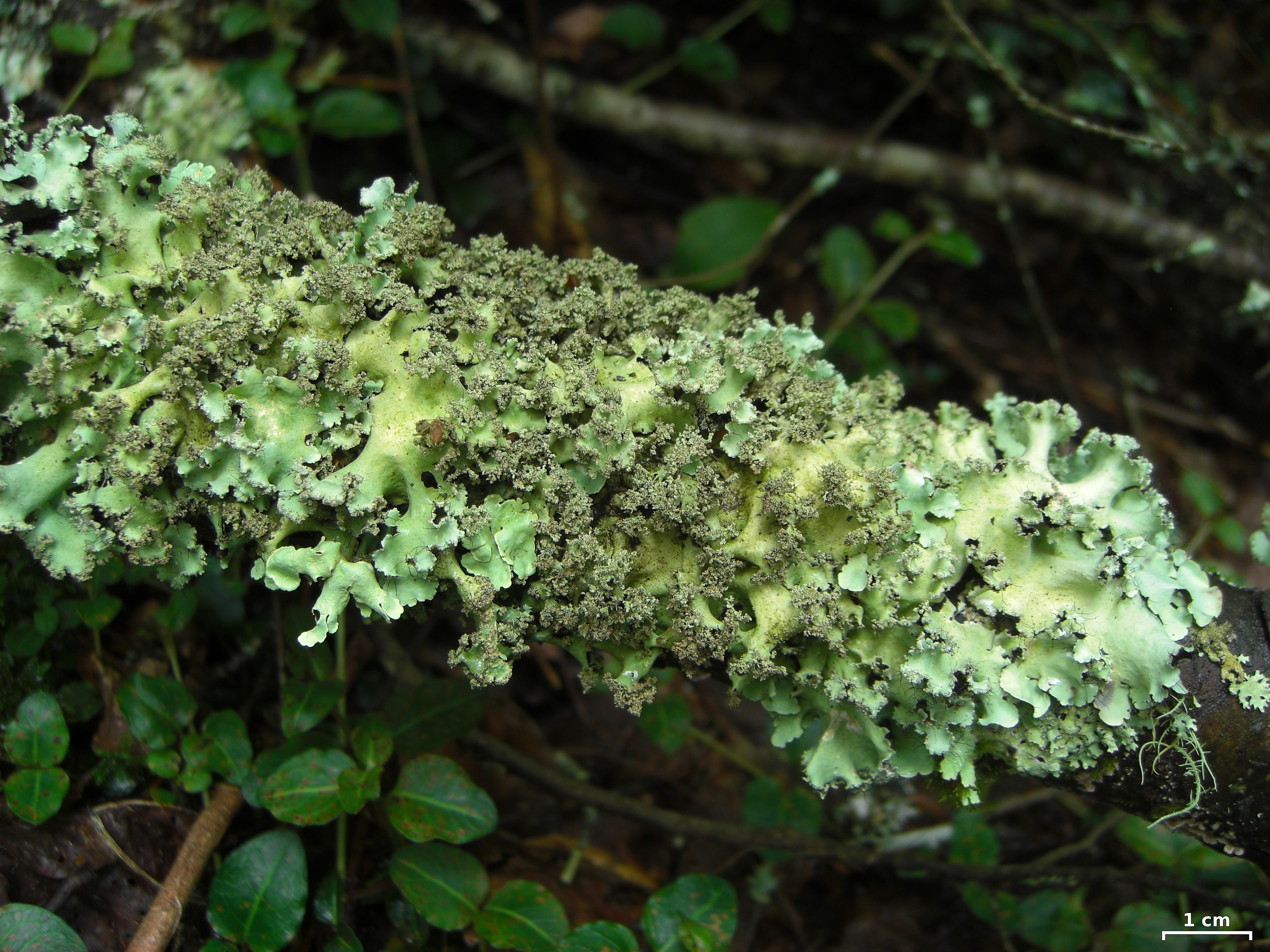

Conservation status
- Apparently Secure (NatureServe)

Scientific classification
- Kingdom: Fungi
- Division: Ascomycota
- Class: Lecanoromycetes
- Order: Lecanorales
- Family: Parmeliaceae
- Genus: Parmotrema
- Species: P. mellissii

Binomial name
- Parmotrema mellissii (C.W.Dodge) Hale (1974)

Synonyms
- Parmelia mellissii C.W.Dodge (1959)

= Parmotrema mellissii =

Species of lichen

Parmotrema mellissii is a widely distributed species of corticolous lichen in the family Parmeliaceae. It was first described by Carroll William Dodge in 1959 as a species of Parmelia. Mason Hale transferred it to the genus Parmotrema in 1974. The type collection was made in Saint Helena. Parmotrema mellissii has a pale yellowish-buff coloured thallus at least 12 cm (5 in) in diameter, comprising rounded lobes about 15 mm wide and long. It has been found in the southern U.S.A., the Neotropics from Mexico to Colombia and Brazil, Africa (including the Canary Islands and Kenya), Asia (Japan, Laos, the Philippines), Australia and Oceania.

== Description ==
The thallus of Parmotrema mellissii is corticolous, with an upper surface ranging from whitish gray to ivory and occasionally displaying large, mottled-black patches. It is dull, epruinose, and emaculate, though sometimes irregularly cracked in parts. The thallus is sparsely to abundantly isidiate, with marginal isidia that are cylindrical, simple to sparsely or abundantly branched (coralloid), and frequently clustered (caespitose).

These isidia are brown to blackened at the tip and often ciliate, giving them a tufted appearance. Lobes are broad and moderate, measuring 0.7–5(–7) mm wide, generally ± rotund, with incised axils and margins that are abundantly ciliate. Cilia are long, slender, black, mostly simple, and measure 0.5–5(–8) mm in length. The lower surface is black, with a distinctly erhizinate, dark brown to black marginal zone 0.5–2.5 mm wide. Rhizines are long, slender, black, mostly simple, and only rarely branched. The medulla is white.

Apothecia are absent or rare, 0.3–7 mm in diameter, with a cupulate thalline margin typically speckled with abundant isidia. The disc is dark brown, deeply concave, and imperforate. Asci are clavate and of the Lecanora-type, containing eight simple, broadly ellipsoid ascospores per ascus, measuring (14.9–)16.0–21.3(–22.3) × (9.4–)11.0–14.1(–14.9) μm, with walls approximately 1 μm thick. Pycnidia have not been observed.

== See also ==
- List of Parmotrema species
