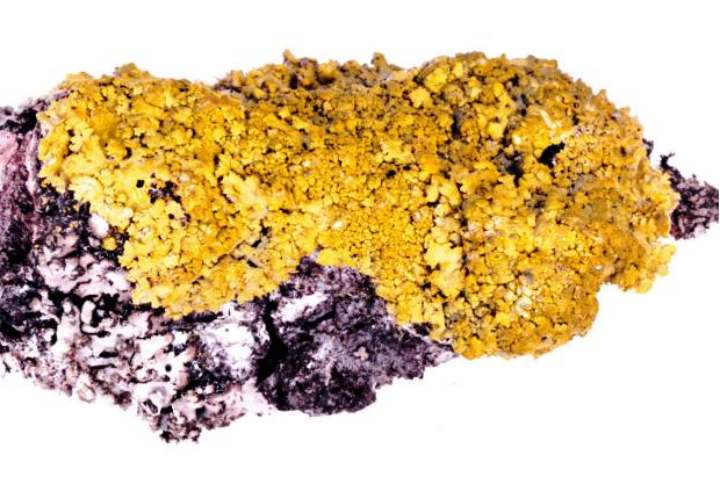

Conservation status
- Secure (NatureServe)

Scientific classification
- Kingdom: Fungi
- Division: Ascomycota
- Class: Candelariomycetes
- Order: Candelariales
- Family: Candelariaceae
- Genus: Candelaria
- Species: C. fibrosa

Binomial name
- Candelaria fibrosa Müll.Arg.

= Candelaria fibrosa =

Species of fungi

Candelaria fibrosa is a species of lichen-forming fungus. In English, it goes by the common name lemon lichen. It also goes by the common name fringed candleflame lichen. It occurs on the bark of wood, and it resembles Xanthoria hasseana.

== Description ==
Candelaria fibrosa is a small foliose lichen with a thallus up to 4 cm wide. The lobes are dorsiventral, lobate, and imbricate, measuring approximately 0.5–2 mm wide and often bearing secondary lobes. The upper surface is lemon yellow to mustard yellow, smooth to somewhat wrinkled, and lacks both soredia and isidia. The upper cortex is about 5–20 μm thick, and the medulla is thin and white. The lower cortex measures approximately 10–35 μm thick and is white to pinkish in color. Rhizines are abundant and simple.

Apothecia are common, laminal, and sessile, up to 2 mm in diameter, with a smooth margin that may have white or yellow cilia. The disc is darker yellow than the thallus. The epithecium is about 10 μm thick; the hymenium is 60–90 μm tall. Paraphyses are cylindrical to submoniliform, sometimes branched at the tips, with tip widths up to 5 μm. The hypothecium is 30–45 μm thick. Asci are clavate and contain more than 30 spores. Ascospores are uni- or biguttulate, colorless, and measure 7–11 × 4–6 μm. Pycnidia are common, immersed, and either concolorous with the upper surface or slightly darker. Conidia are ellipsoid to narrowly ellipsoid, measuring 2–3.5 × 1.5 μm.

Spot test results: upper surface K− (or K+ deeper yellow), C−, KC−, P−; medulla K−, C−, KC−, P−. Secondary metabolites include calycin (major) and pulvinic dilactone (minor).
