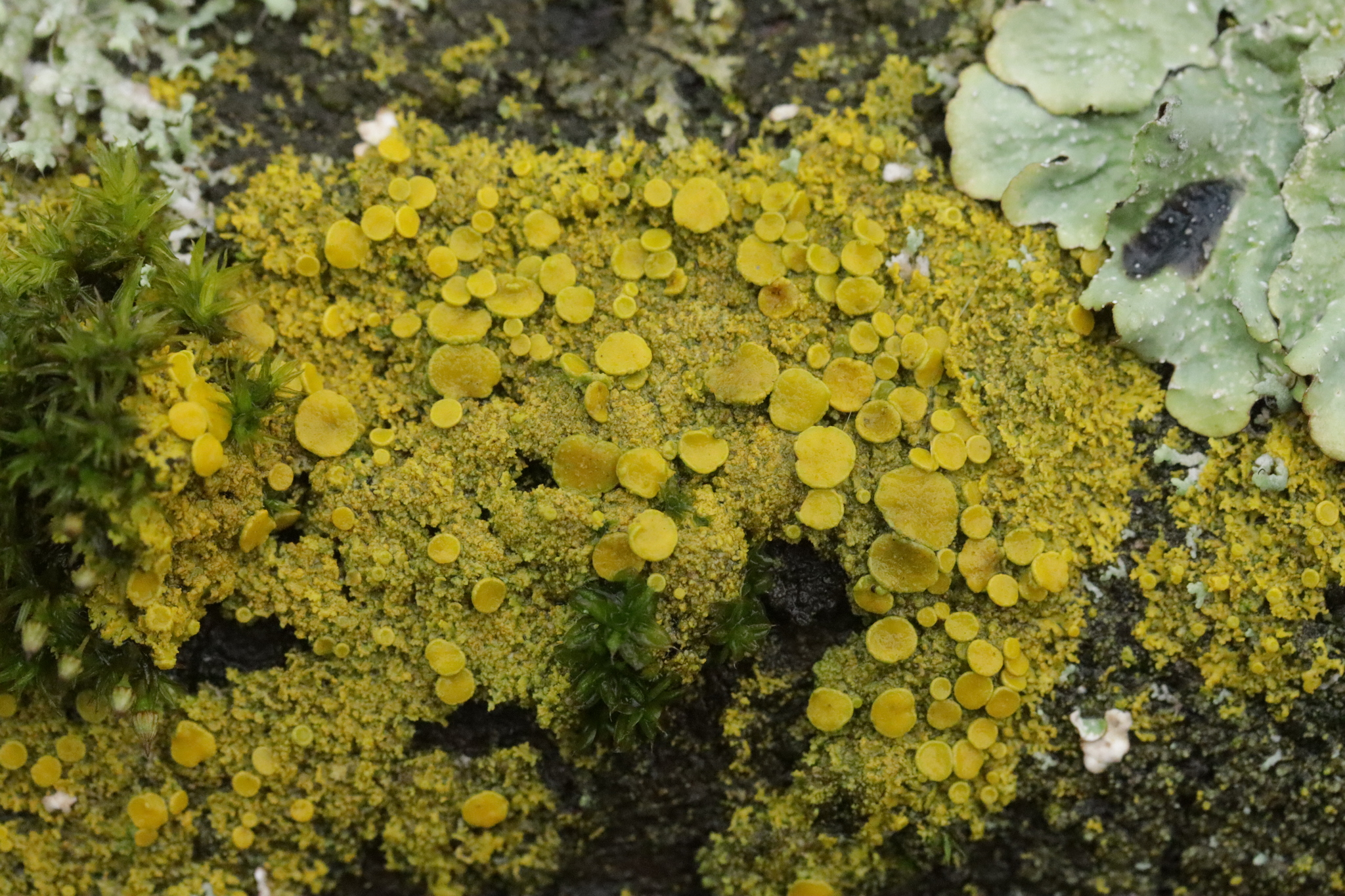

Conservation status
- Secure (NatureServe)

Scientific classification
- Kingdom: Fungi
- Division: Ascomycota
- Class: Candelariomycetes
- Order: Candelariales
- Family: Candelariaceae
- Genus: Candelaria
- Species: C. concolor

Binomial name
- Candelaria concolor (Dicks.) Stein (1879)

Synonyms
- List: *Blasteniospora concolor (Dicks.) Trevis. (1869); *Caloplaca concolor (Dicks.) Jatta (1900); *Lecanora concolor (Dicks.) Lamy (1880); *Lichen concolor Dicks. (1793); *Lobaria concolor (Dicks.) Hoffm. (1796); *Parmelia parietina f. concolor (Dicks.) Fr. (1831); *Parmelia parietina var. concolor (Dicks.) Fr. (1831); *Physcia concolor (Dicks.) Bagl. & Carestia (1880); *Physcia parietina var. concolor (Dicks.) Mudd (1861); *Teloschistes concolor (Dicks.) Tuck. (1882); *Xanthoria concolor (Dicks.) Th.Fr. (1871)

= Candelaria concolor =

Species of lichen

Candelaria concolor, commonly known as the candleflame lichen or the lemon lichen, is an ascomycete of the genus Candelaria. It is a small foliose lichen dispersed globally.

== Description and morphology ==
The vegetative body, or thallus, of the lichen is foliose, and its color ranges from bright-yellow to yellow-green. Thallus is minute (less than 1cm wide), but aggregates to form extensive colonies. Lobes of the thallus are flattened and divided. Soredia are granular and are found in margins between or at the end of lobes. Apothecia are rare and minute (under 1 mm). Asci are clavate and contain over 30 ascospores. Pycnidia are much more common and are found as wart-like structures on the upper-surface of the thallus. Pycnidia are often the same color as the thallus, with darker conidia. Lower surface of the thallus is whitish-pink with white rhizines.

=== Green modules ===
Candelaria concolor has been used as in anatomical studies of lichen looking at green modules, clusters of algae and hyphae. Electron micrograph images has revealed pockets of a protein called hydrophobin surrounding these modules. It has been postulated that these pockets allow for gas and water exchange to the algal layer of the lichen.

== Distinctions ==
Candelaria concolor is often misidentified as a member of Xanthoria, however C. concolor is K−, whereas Xanthoria species are K+ with a bright red to purple reaction.

Candelaria concolor can be distinguished from Candelaria pacifica due to its larger lobes, distinct lower cortex, and relatively large white rhizines. Asci of C. pacifica also contain only 8 ascospores.

Notable secondary metabolites created by C. concolor include: pulvinic dilactone, vulpinic acid, calycin.

== Habitat and distribution ==
Globally distributed. Very common species in North America and Europe. One of the most common lichen species in the Chihuahuan and Sonoran Deserts. Most commonly found of the bark of trees, especially that of Acer, Fraxinus, Salix, and Ulmus. Also found on wooden fences and poles. Less often seen on rocks and walls. Prefer well lit areas. Can be found in the emergent layer of forests in through birds dispersing both soredia and nutrients, however a different study found that C. concolor becomes more and more rare as canopy height increases.

== Ecology and conservation ==
Listed as IUCN Least Concern in Great Britain and Ireland. Regularly found in eutrophicated habitats, and can be an indicator of high nitrogen in the environment when found as the dominant lichen species. Quite tolerant to pollution, found in many urban environments.
