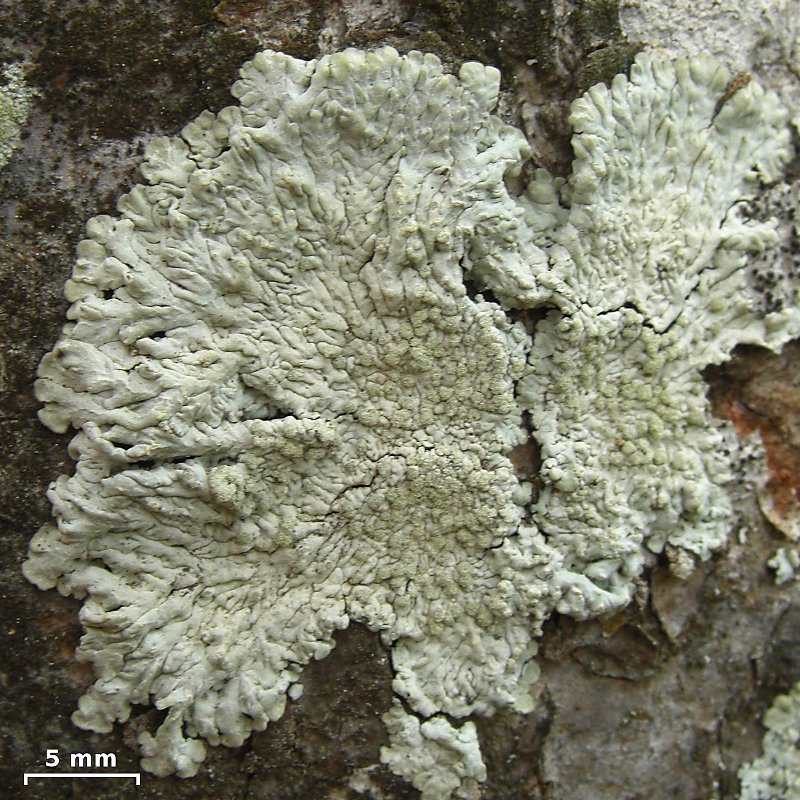

Scientific classification
- Kingdom: Fungi
- Division: Ascomycota
- Class: Lecanoromycetes
- Order: Caliciales
- Family: Caliciaceae
- Genus: Dirinaria
- Species: D. applanata

Binomial name
- Dirinaria applanata (Fée) D.D.Awasthi (1970)

Synonyms
- Parmelia applanata Fée (1825); Anaptychia applanata (Fée) A.Massal. (1853); Physcia applanata (Fée) Nyl. (1858); Lecanora flavostraminea (Müll.Arg.) Zahlbr. (1928); Placodium flavostramineum Müll.Arg. (1895); Parmelia redacta Stirt. (1900); Dirinaria consimilis var. ochracea D.D.Awasthi (1975)

= Dirinaria applanata =

Species of lichen-forming fungus

Dirinaria applanata is a species of corticolous (bark-dwelling), foliose lichen in the family Caliciaceae. It has a wide distribution in tropical and subtropical areas of the world.

== Taxonomy ==
The lichen was formally described as a new species, Parmelia applanata, by Antoine Laurent Apollinaire Fée in 1825. Dharani Dhar Awasthi transferred it to the Dirinaria in 1970.

== Chemistry ==
Chemical analysis of Dirinaria applanata lead to the discovery of nine unique compounds. This includes a novel hopane derivative known as 1β-acetoxy-21α-hopane-3β,22-diol. Alongside this, researchers have identified six phenolic compounds: divaricatinic acid, methyl divaricatinate, methyl-β-orcinolcarboxylate, methyl haematommate, divarinol, and ramalinic acid A. Additionally, two xanthones, namely lichexanthone and 4,5-dichlorolichexanthone, were also isolated.

== Habitat and distribution ==
In Nepal, Dirinaria applanata has been reported at 600 m elevation in a compilation of published records.

== Species interactions ==
A fungus newly described in 2023, Cylindromonium dirinariae, was reported as a lichenicolous fungus with Dirinaria applanata as its host. This nectrioid fungus forms a pinkish colony with mainly solitary phialides producing ellipsoid, aseptate conidia in mucoid packets.
