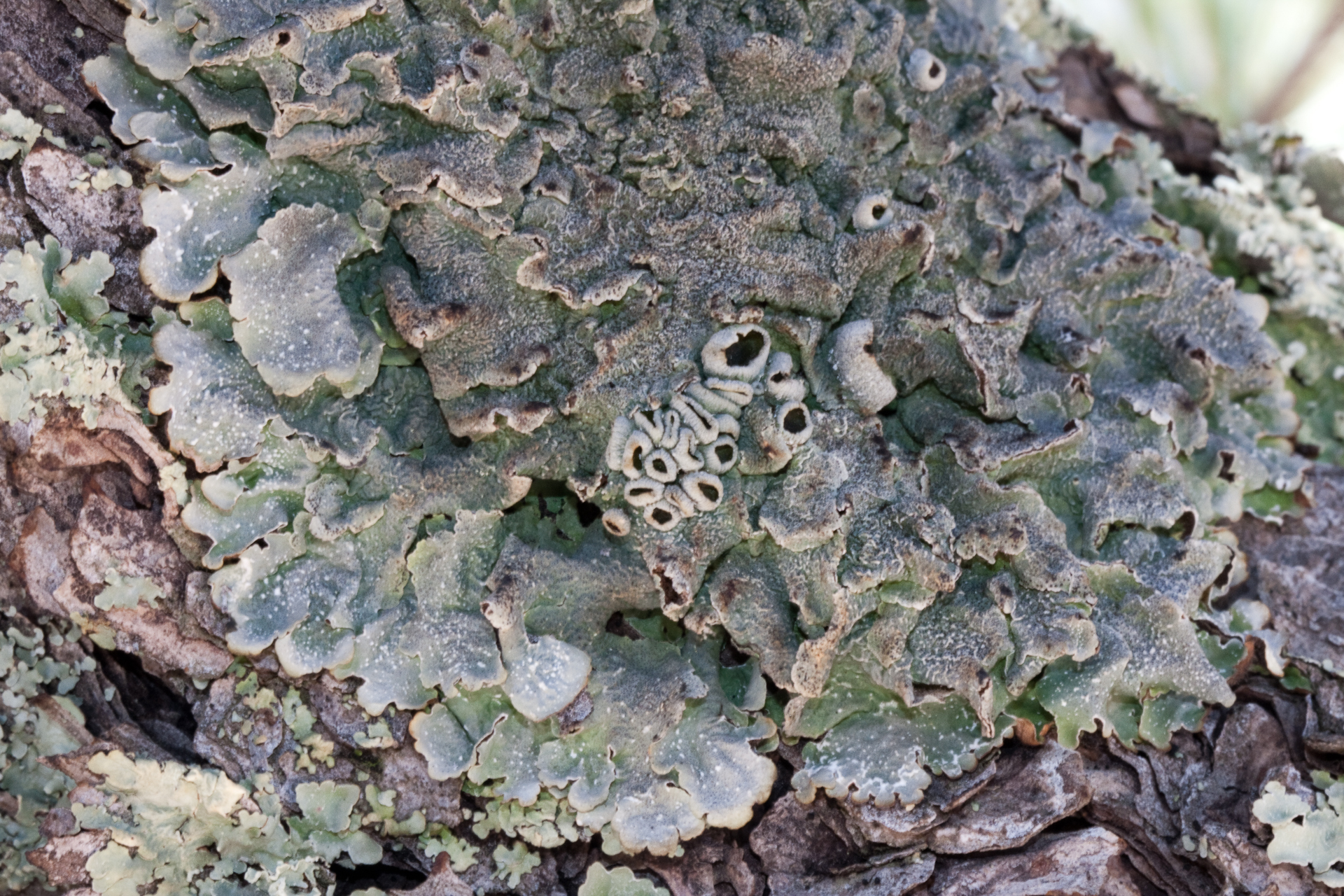
- Growing on the bark of Arizona cypress in Chiricahua National Monument, Arizona. A cluster of apothecia is visible in the center of the thallus

Conservation status
- Apparently Secure (NatureServe)

Scientific classification
- Kingdom: Fungi
- Division: Ascomycota
- Class: Lecanoromycetes
- Order: Lecanorales
- Family: Parmeliaceae
- Genus: Punctelia
- Species: P. hypoleucites

Binomial name
- Punctelia hypoleucites (Nyl.) Krog (1982)

Synonyms
- Parmelia hypoleucites Nyl. (1858); Parmelia borreri subsp. hypoleucites (Nyl.) Nyl. (1860)

= Punctelia hypoleucites =

Species of foliose lichen

Punctelia hypoleucites, commonly known as the southwestern speckled shield lichen, is a species of foliose (leafy) lichen in the family Parmeliaceae. First formally described by Finnish botanist William Nylander as a species of Parmelia, it was transferred to the genus Punctelia in 1982. The lichen is found in Africa, North America, and South America, where it grows on the bark of both hardwood and coniferous trees. Its greenish-grey thallus is covered with tiny white pseudocyphellae – minute holes in the thallus surface that facilitate gas exchange. Some macroscopic features that help distinguish this species from other related members of the genus include the presence and the structure of the apothecia (sexual reproductive organs), the absence of asexual surface propagules, and the light brown color of the thallus undersurface. Chemically, the presence of lecanoric acid in the medulla and atranorin in the cortex help distinguish it from lookalikes.

== Taxonomy ==
The lichen was first described as a new species by Finnish botanist William Nylander in 1858 as Parmelia hypoleucites. The type specimens were collected on the Pico de Orizaba, Veracruz, Mexico, by Fritz Müller, who sent them to Nylander for identification. Nylander mentioned its similarity to Parmelia saxatilis, but noted that it was smoother, with a paler underside and whitish rhizines (root-like structures). The specific epithet combines the Greek prefix hypo- ("under") with a form of the word leukos ("white"). Although Nylander did not mention it in his text, Müller sent two specimens from Veracruz, both of which were assigned the name Parmelia hypoleucites by Nylander. The smaller one of them is attached to bark (and is thus clearly corticolous), but it is poorly developed and lacks conidia (asexual spores) and apothecia (ascus-bearing structures). The second specimen is much larger, has conidia, but has a clean undersurface indicative of having grown on rock. In 1965, Mason Hale designated the larger specimen as the type for the species, a decision that was followed by Hildur Krog and Dougal Swinscow in their 1977 study of the Parmelia borreri species group.

A few years later, William and Chicita Culberson reported their observations on the differences in the length of the conidia in populations of P. hypoleucites collected from Arizona and Mexico. They noted that the long-form conidia morphs (P. hypoleucites) grew on bark and had a range restricted to woodlands of the Mexican highlands, while the short-form conidia morphs grew on rocks and were widespread in south-central North America, with few occurrences in regions with the long-form morph. They used this dimorphism to distinguish the short-form morph as a distinct species, P. semansiana, using the larger of Müller's specimens as the type of this new species, and designated the smaller, corticolous specimen as the type for Parmelia hypoleucites. Later, in a 2003 study, Robert Shaw Egan found P. semansiana to be identical with P. graminicola.

Krog transferred Parmelia hypoleucites and 21 other Parmelia species with rounded (punctate) pseudocyphellae (tiny pores that facilitate gas exchange) to the newly circumscribed genus Punctelia in 1982. The lichen is known colloquially as the "southwestern speckled shield lichen".

== Description ==
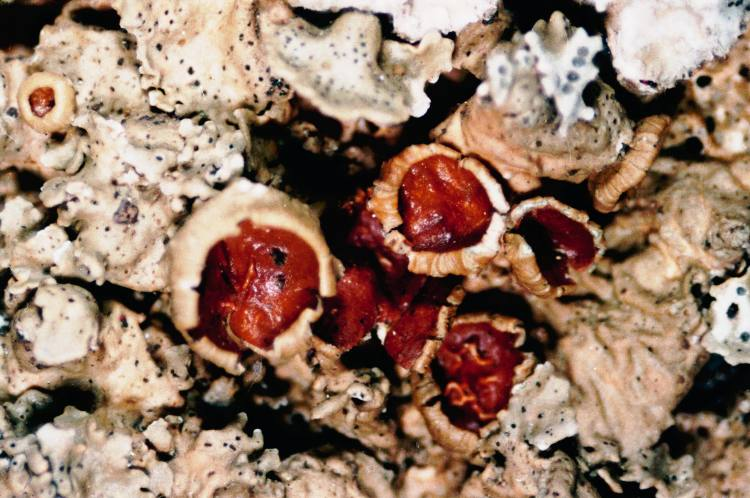
Closeup of apothecia of a herbarium specimen

Punctelia hypoleucites has a leafy (foliose) thallus measuring 7 cm (2.8 in) or more in diameter, with an upper limit of 12 cm (4.7 in). It has a fairly tight attachment to its substrate. When fresh, the upper thallus surface has a gray-greenish color; when dry it is brown-yellowish. The individual lobes comprising the thallus are typically up to 5 mm (0.2 in) wide (sometimes up to 1 cm wide), and they have rounded tips, sometimes developing a brownish margin that is narrow and shiny. The entire thallus surface is covered with abundant point-like (punctiform) white pseudocyphellae, which are up to 0.5 mm in diameter. There are not any asexual reproductive structures such as soralia nor isidia. Conspicuous pycnidia (asexual fruiting bodies) are present on the thallus as tiny black dots, especially near the margins of the lobes. The rounded lobes measure 2–6 mm (0.1–0.2 in) wide. The medulla – a layer of interlaced hyphae below the upper cortex – is white, while the thallus undersurface is light brown. Rhizines are abundant on the thallus underside; they are whitish or brown and mostly unbranched. The apothecia are 5–15 mm (0.2–0.6 in) in diameter, and are abundant. These cup-shaped reproductive structures are positioned on the surface of the thallus and have a brown hymenium (fertile, spore-bearing tissue), with a thick margin (an excipulum) that is curled inwards slightly. Pseudocyphellae occur on the excipulum. Ascospores, which number eight per ascus, have an ellipsoid shape, lack septa, and are smooth, translucent (hyaline), and thin-walled; they measure 14.4–17.6 by 8.8–9.6 μm. The conidia are threadlike (filiform) and hyaline, typically measuring 9.6 by 12 μm.

Standard chemical spot tests can be used to help identify Punctelia hypoleucites. In the medulla, the results of these tests are K-, KC+ (red), and C+ (red). The last of these indicates the presence of lecanoric acid. The cortex contains atranorin, which results in a K+ (yellow) reaction.

Punctelia hypoleucites is quite similar in appearance to P. bolliana; both have a brown underside, have apothecia, and lack soralia and isidia, but P. hypoleucites contains lecanoric acid while the medulla of P. bolliana contains lichesterinic and protolichesterinic acid. Another lookalike is Punctelia subpraesignis, which can be distinguished from P. hypoleucites by its dark brown to almost black thallus undersurface, and chemically by the presence of gyrophoric acid rather than lecanoric acid. Because of its abundant pseudocyphellae and similar overall appearance, Flavopunctelia praesignis is another lichen that could be mistaken for P. hypoleucites, but this species has a black undersurface and an overall yellowish-green coloring resulting from usnic acid.

== Habitat and distribution ==
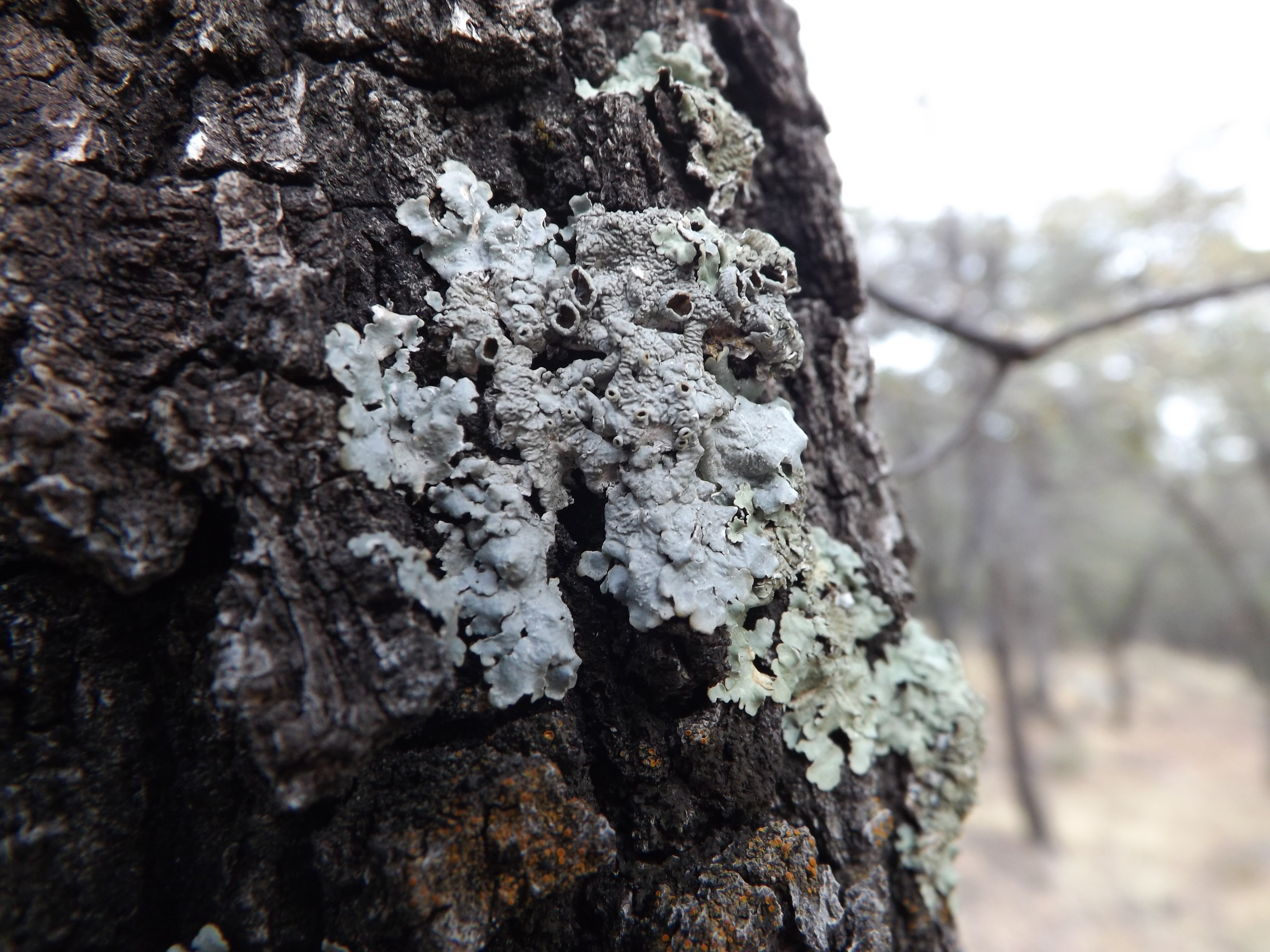
Individual growing on bark in Madera Canyon, Arizona, at an elevation of 1,839 m (6,033 ft); the greener lichen growing next to it is Flavopunctelia

In Mexico, Punctelia hypoleucites has been recorded from the states of Mexico, Guerrero, Puebla, Hidalgo, Veracruz, Jalisco, Michoacán, Colima, Nayarit, and Zacatecas. It is one of the most abundant foliose lichens in the Nueva Galicia region. In the United States, where it is relatively rare, the lichen is found in the southwestern region of the country; specifically, it has been recorded from Arizona, New Mexico, and Texas. First recorded from East Africa in 1977, it has been found in Ethiopia and Kenya. In South America it occurs in Argentina, and Bolivia.

The lichen grows on bark, usually of deciduous trees. It is a conspicuous member of the lichen flora in certain parts of its range, such as in oak and oak-pine forests at high elevations – greater than 2,000 m (6,600 ft). Here it has been observed to be part of flourishing epiphytic lichen communities, along with the common Flavopunctelia flaventior and members of the genera Everniastrum, Heterodermia, Hypogymnia, and Parmotrema. At lower elevations it is mostly absent, despite the abundance of potential substrates, and the individuals that are found tend to lack apothecia and pycnidia. Tree genera upon which the lichen has been recorded include the hardwoods Acer, Alnus, Arbutus, Quercus, Fraxinus, Prosopis, Prunus, Salix,Willardia, and the conifers Cupressus, Juniperus, Pinus, and Pseudotsuga.

Because of the widespread occurrence of Punctelia hypoleucites in both urban and industrial sites in and around Tandil, it has been proposed as a potential biomonitor of air pollution in that city.

A study on the post‐fire recolonization of dominant epiphytic lichen species on Quercus hypoleucoides determined that the primary means of recolonization for P. hypoleucites is spore dispersal.
