= Candelina mexicana =

Scientific classification
- Kingdom: Fungi
- Division: Ascomycota
- Class: Candelariomycetes
- Order: Candelariales
- Family: Candelariaceae
- Genus: Candelina
- Species: C. mexicana

Binomial name
- Candelina mexicana (B.de Lesd.) Poelt (1974)

Synonyms
- Placodium mexicanum B.de Lesd. (1914); Caloplaca mexicana (B.de Lesd.) Zahlbr. (1931)

Species of lichen

Candelina mexicana is a species of crustose lichen in the family Candelariaceae. This lichen forms bright yellow, rosette-shaped patches on sun-exposed rocks, with narrow lobes radiating outward from the center. It is found across a wide range from the southwestern United States through Mexico to northern South America, typically growing on non-calcareous rocks in arid and semi-arid environments. The species was first discovered in Mexico in the early 1900s and is distinguished from similar yellow lichens by its unique cellular structure and chemical composition.

== Taxonomy ==
The species was originally described by Maurice Bouly de Lesdain in 1914 as Placodium mexicanum. When he established Candelina, Josef Poelt selected this species as the type species of the genus, making the new combination Candelina mexicana; because the original type material had been destroyed, he also designated a replacement type (a "neo-holotype" in his wording). The neotype is Brother Arsène’s collection no. 4040 from Rincón, Morelia, Michoacán (21 January 1910; US), with additional paratype material from nearby localities; Poelt also listed the surviving syntype localities in Puebla (Tepoxuchitl) and multiple sites around Morelia on volcanic rock.

== Description ==
Candelina mexicana forms closely appressed, rosette-shaped thalli that are typically 2–3 cm across, although older growth may merge into larger patches. The marginal lobes are narrow and fragile, usually up to about 5 mm long and 0.3–0.8 mm wide; they are crowded yet remain free from one another, convex to flattened (often flattened toward the tips) and sometimes shallowly forked. The thallus center commonly carries a mat of smaller secondary lobes that overtop the primary ones. The upper surface is smooth and bright yellow, sometimes with a more orange tone, especially around the tiny pycnidial openings. The underside is distinctly corticate, yellow near the margin but otherwise whitish, and the thallus attaches to the rock by hyphae or, frequently, by robust haptera (small holdfasts). Apothecia are present and lecanorine in form (bearing a thalline margin). At the generic level, Candelina has a thin, very fragile upper and lower cortex of paraplectenchymatous cells ("Candelina type"), pycnidia that are immersed in the thallus, and eight narrowly ellipsoid, 1–2-celled, colourless ascospores. In sectioned thalli of C. mexicana, the upper cortex consists of one to two layers of hyaline, distinctly paraplectenchymatous cells that are capped externally by a thick, tightly cemented layer of yellow pigment granules; there is no hyaline "coating" above the pigments. The photobiont layer overlies a bright-yellow medulla, which is often exposed where the cortex is abraded. This cortical construction differentiates Candelina from superficially similar Placomaronea, which has "peppered" pigment hoods on inflated apical cortex cells and a sloughing hyaline coating.

=== Similar species ===
Placodioid, bright-yellow rosettes with a lower cortex also occur in Placomaronea, especially P. placoidea, and can strongly resemble Candelina in the field. They separate by cortex anatomy: Candelina has a thin paraplectenchymatous cortex capped by a dense, cemented layer of pigment granules and lacks any hyaline surface coating, whereas Placomaronea shows "peppered" pigment hoods on inflated apical cortex cells and a thin hyaline coating that sloughs from the surface; in P. placoidea the lobes soon become hollow. Within Candelina, C. submexicana is a frequent point of confusion; it shares the overall placodioid habit but differs in lobe proportions and details of the cortex visible in section.

== Chemistry ==
Thin-layer chromatography shows pulvinic acid derivatives as the dominant secondary metabolites (lichen products). Examined material of C. mexicana falls into two recurrent chemotypes: (A) pulvinic acid (major) with 4-hydroxypulvinic acid, pulvinic dilactone and calycin (minor to trace) plus terpenoids; and (B) the same suite but lacking pulvinic dilactone. Spot tests on the thallus surface vary from K+ (red to weakly reddish) or negative across specimens, likely reflecting differences in pulvinic acid derivative concentrations.

== Habitat and distribution ==
Candelina mexicana grows on sun-exposed, non-calcareous rock, typically on horizontal to sloping faces, and is saxicolous across its range. It occurs from Texas south through Mexico to northern South America; Poelt (1974) reported it to Ecuador, while verified herbarium records document the southwestern United States (Arizona and Texas) and Venezuela (the states of Mérida and Lara). In Mexico, C. mexicana is verified from numerous states, including Baja California Sur, Chihuahua, Coahuila, Durango, Guanajuato, Estado de México, Michoacán, Morelos, Oaxaca, Puebla, Sonora, Veracruz, and Zacatecas; it is also documented from the arid zone of Aguascalientes (Rincón de Romos municipality, about 2,120 m elevation) on sun-exposed rock in semi-dry shrubland.
