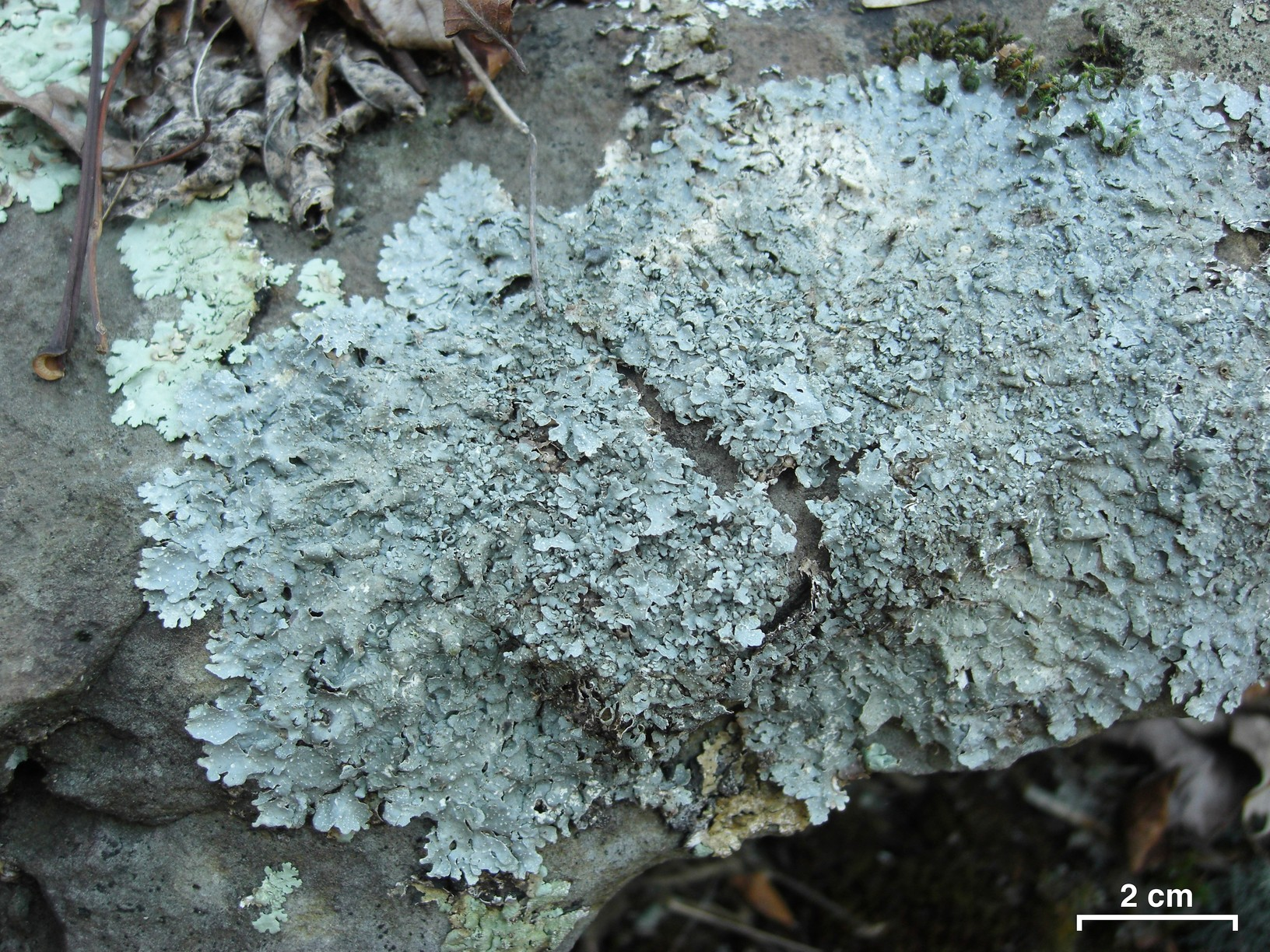
- In Arkansas, United States

Scientific classification
- Kingdom: Fungi
- Division: Ascomycota
- Class: Lecanoromycetes
- Order: Lecanorales
- Family: Parmeliaceae
- Genus: Punctelia
- Species: P. graminicola

Binomial name
- Punctelia graminicola (B.de Lesd.) Egan (2003)

Synonyms
- Parmelia graminicola B.de Lesd. (1942); Parmelia semansiana W.L.Culb. & C.F.Culb. (1980); Punctelia semansiana (W.L.Culb & C.F.Culb.) Krog (1982)

= Punctelia graminicola =

Species of lichen

Punctelia graminicola is a species of foliose (leafy) lichen in the family Parmeliaceae. It grows on rocks, and, less frequently, on bark in North America, South America, and East Africa. It has a blue-grey thallus measuring up to about 15 cm (6 in), covered with tiny pores called pseudocyphellae. Sometimes the lichen forms small lobes that project out from the surface. Fruiting bodies are uncommon in this species; if present, they resemble small cups with a brown internal disc measuring 3–10 mm (0.1–0.4 in) in diameter. A lookalike species, Punctelia hypoleucites, is not readily distinguishable from Punctelia graminicola by appearance or habitat alone; these species can only be reliably differentiated by examining the length of their conidia (asexual spores).

First described in 1942 from specimens collected in New Mexico by Brother Arsène Brouard, the type specimen, stored in Dunkirk, was destroyed during World War II. After that, the name was relegated to synonymy with Punctelia subrudecta. In 1980, the species became known as Parmelia semansiana after studies published by William and Chicita Culberson; a couple of years later it was transferred to the new genus Punctelia, created to contain Parmelia-like species with pseudocyphellae on the thallus surface. Its name was changed again after, in 2001, some of Brouard's collections were rescued from disposal at a local landfill. Among this material were duplicates of the original collection that used the original epithet graminicola.

== Taxonomy ==
The lichen was first formally described in 1942 as a new species by French lichenologist Maurice Bouly de Lesdain, as Parmelia graminicola. The type specimens were collected by Brother Arsène Brouard, a Lasallian Catholic monk, in 1935 from two sites near Las Vegas, New Mexico, at an altitude of 1,900 m (6,200 ft). The specific epithet graminicola suggests a close association with grasses, as gramini refers to the grass family Gramineae, while the ending -cola indicates a dweller or inhabitant, and is usually used to imply the habitat. However, Bouly de Lesdain noted that the lichen was found growing on mosses and the spikemoss Selaginella. Bouly de Lesdain kept this material, and other collections sent to him by Brouard, at his private herbarium in Dunkirk. The herbarium was destroyed during the bombing of Dunkerque in World War II, and his collections were destroyed. After the loss of the type material, the name Parmelia graminicola was often later relegated to synonymy with Punctelia subrudecta. In his original description of Parmelia graminicola, Bouly de Lesdain had noted its similarity to P. subrudecta.

In 1980, William and Chicita Culberson reported their observations on the differences in the length of the conidia in populations of Parmelia hypoleucites collected from Arizona and Mexico. They noted that the long-form conidia morphs (P. hypoleucites) grew on bark and had a range restricted to woodlands of the Mexican highlands, while the short-form conidia morphs grew on rocks and were widespread in south-central North America, with few occurrences in regions with the long-form morph. They used this dimorphism to distinguish the short-form morph as a distinct species, P. semansiana, using the larger of Müller's specimens as the type of this new species. (Note: Parmelia semansiana was named to honour philanthropist Mary Semans, who was a benefactor at Duke University.) Hildur Krog transferred Parmelia semansiana and 21 other Parmelia species with rounded (punctate) pseudocyphellae to the newly circumscribed genus Punctelia in 1982.

In 2001, after Robert Shaw Egan discovered that some of Brouard's collections had been rescued from being disposed at a local (New Mexico) landfill, the specimens were transferred to Arizona State University and curated. Among the lichens were specimens collected in 1935 close to the Chimayó dam, thus at the same time and place as some of the specimens on which the species description of Parmelia graminicola was based; Egan suggested that they are isotypes (i.e. duplicates of the holotype) or isosyntypes (i.e., duplicates of syntypes) of the original specimens. P. semansiana was found to be identical with P. graminicola.

== Description ==
The thallus of Punctelia graminicola measures 3.0–14.5 cm (1.2–5.7 in) in diameter. It comprises irregularly branched lobes, often crowded or overlapping, measuring 2–4 mm (0.08–0.16 in) wide. The upper thallus surface is blue-grey to greenish-grey, often with brown margins, and usually smooth and without pruina. Herbarium specimens tend to turn brown. Pseudocyphellae on the thallus surface range in number from occasional to abundant. They are circular to irregularly shaped, measuring 0.03–0.6 by 0.03–0.4 mm. The medulla is white. Propagules such as isidia or soralia are absent in this species, but sometimes the lichen forms lobules – small lobes (lacinulae) on the lobe margins that project out from the surface. Adriano Spielmann and Marcelo Marcelli have noted that Punctelia graminicola has a broad species concept, as it include individuals both with and without lacinulae. The thallus undersurface ranges in color from pale tan to light to medium brown, with sparse, light-colored rhizines. These rhizines are completely covered by a cortex.

The upper cortex is paraplenctenchymatous; this means that it is made of a type of tissue in which the hyphae are oriented in all directions, analogous to the parenchyma of plants. Depending on the dimensions of the thallus, the upper cortex is between 3 and 7 cells thick. It comprises three distinct layers: the top layer is made of small rounded cells that contact the epicortex; the lower layer is itself organised into two layers of larger, thicker-walled cells with a gelatinous appearance. Covering the upper cortex is a thin epicortex, which is continuous even over the pseudocyphellae. The pseudocyphellae are formed from the inside to outside of the thallus. Hyphae in the medulla are organized in circular groups at specific sites of the thallus; these groups of hyphae push the algal cells towards the upper cortex—rupturing both cortex and epicortex—and exposing the medulla. The size of the pore gradually increases as the cortical cells around the inside perimeter disintegrate and the medullary hyphae grow into the pore area.

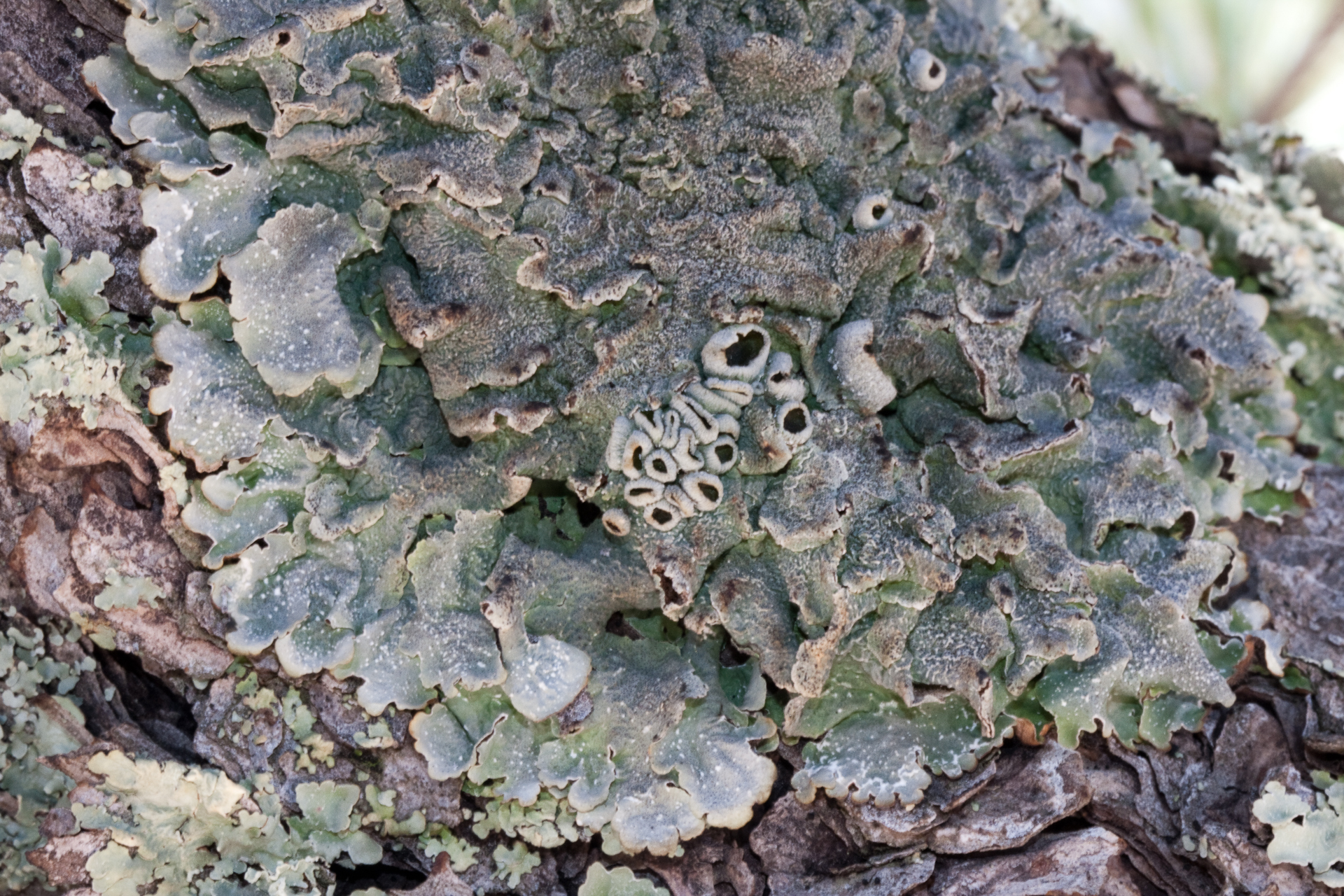
Punctelia hypoleucites, shown here, can be distinguished from P. graminicola using microscopic characteristics

Punctelia graminicola occasionally makes apothecia, although they are absent or immature in some individuals. They are cup shaped with a brown disc measuring 3–10 mm (0.1–0.4 in) in diameter. There are often abundant pseudocyphellae on the folded margins of the apothecia. The ascospores are more or less spherical to broadly ellipsoid, translucent, and measure 7–14 by 6–9 μm. Depending on the individual lichen, pycnidia can be rare or abundant. They are immersed in the thallus surface, resembling brown to black dots. They produce conidia that are usually like short, translucent rods and have a length of 5–6 by 1 μm; in rare instances the conidia are hooklike (unciform).

The expected results of standard lichen spot tests for Punctelia graminicola are K+ (yellow), C−, KC−, P−, and UV− in the upper cortex; the cortex contains atranorin as a minor or trace component, and chloroatranorin in trace amounts. In the medulla, spot test results are K−, KC+ (red), C+ (red), P−, and UV−, indicating the presence of lecanoric acid.

Punctelia hypoleucites is quite similar in appearance, and can be reliably distinguished from Punctelia graminicola by the length of its conidia (11–12 μm). Unlike Punctelia graminicola, which grows on both rock and bark (the latter much less frequently), Punctelia hypoleucites only grows on bark.

== Habitat and distribution ==
Punctelia graminicola grows on rocks, or on mosses that are on rocks. It has been recorded growing on a wide variety of rocks: basalt, conglomerate, granite, limestone, rhyolite, sandstone, schist, and volcanic. Much less frequently, it grows on bark. Recorded bark substrates include Fouquieria, Cupressus, and Quercus. In the United States, Punctelia graminicola occurs in the central US east to the Appalachians. It is common in the Great Plains region, extending to the southwestern part of the country. The Culbersons note that in the US, the lichen is only commonly found on trees in the centre of its range, while being largely confined to rock in the peripheries of its range. They suggest that the lichen "is primarily adapted to life on rock, extending substrate tolerance to bark only under the most favorable ecological conditions".

In Mexico Punctelia graminicola is widely distributed across the northern and central parts of the country. Its range continues south into Central America. In South America, its distribution includes Argentina and Brazil. In East Africa (where it was recorded as P. semansiana), it is rare; it is known from Ethiopia, Kenya, and Tanzania.
