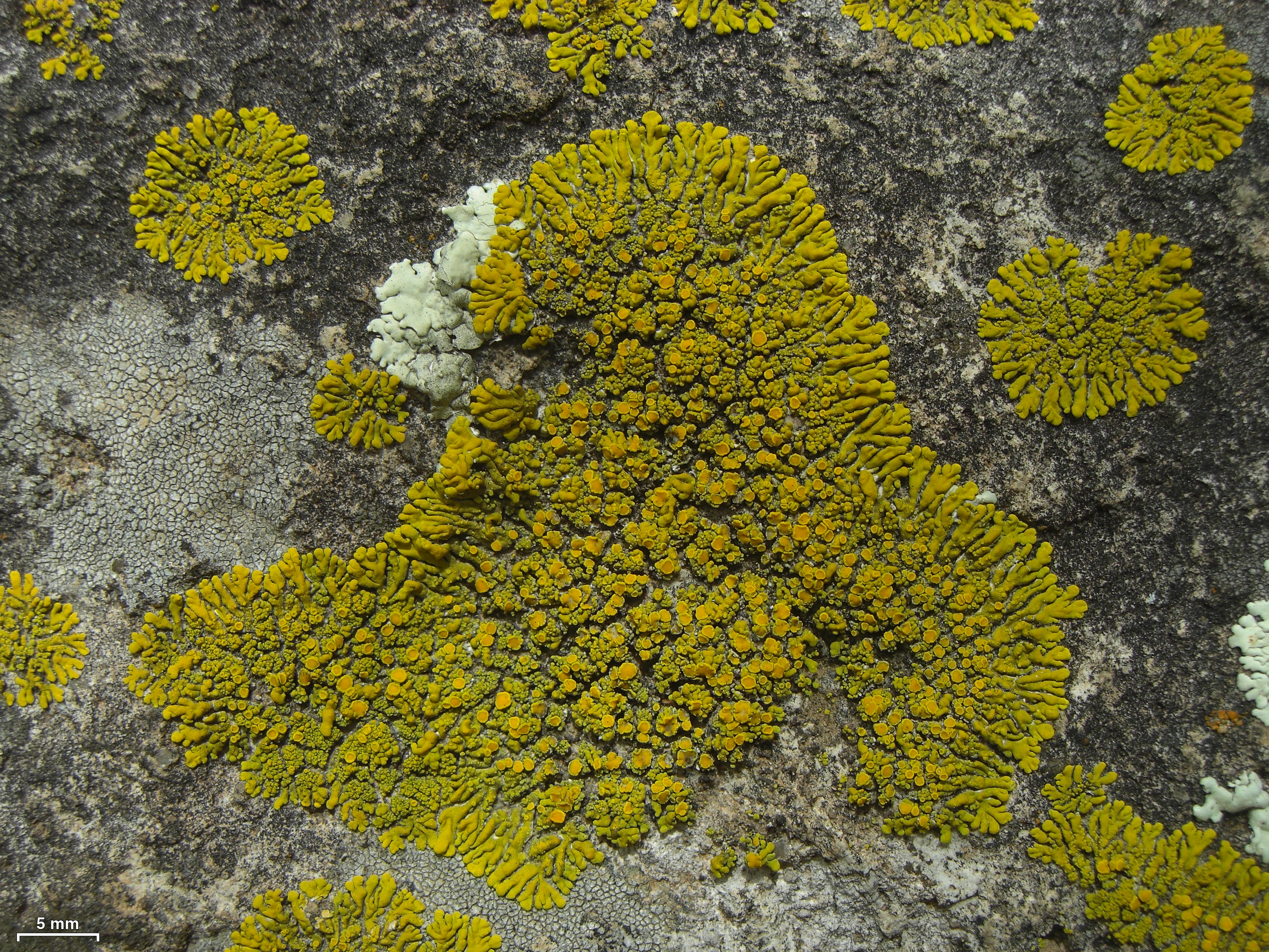
- in Chiricahua Mountains, Arizona

Scientific classification
- Kingdom: Fungi
- Division: Ascomycota
- Class: Candelariomycetes
- Order: Candelariales
- Family: Candelariaceae
- Genus: Candelina
- Species: C. submexicana

Binomial name
- Candelina submexicana (B.de Lesd.) Poelt (1974)

Synonyms
- Placodium submexicanum B.de Lesd. (1914); Candelariella submexicana B.de Lesd. (1929); Caloplaca submexicana (B.de Lesd.) Zahlbr. (1931); Caloplacopsis submexicana (B.de Lesd.) B.de Lesd. (1932)

= Candelina submexicana =

Species of lichen

Candelina submexicana is a species of saxicolous (rock-dwelling) crustose lichen in the family Candelariaceae. This small lichen forms yellow patches that hug tightly to rock surfaces, with flattened lobes radiating outward from the center. It is closely related to Candelina mexicana but can be distinguished by its smaller size, more reddish-yellow color, and different internal structure. The species grows in sunny, dry locations across Mexico, the southwestern United States, and Peru, typically on exposed non-limestone rocks.

== Taxonomy ==
Candelina submexicana was originally described by Maurice Bouly de Lesdain as Placodium submexicanum (1914). Poelt transferred it to Candelina and, because Bouly de Lesdain's herbarium had been destroyed, designated a new type: Frère Nicolas no. 5647 from "Tepoxúchitl", Puebla (housed at US), noting that this superseded his provisional typification from 1958. Poelt also listed a second syntype locality at Río San Francisco, Puebla, and documented later combinations the name passed through (e.g., Candelariella submexicana, Caloplaca submexicana, Caloplacopsis submexicana).

== Description ==
The species forms small, closely appressed rosettes (a placodioid thallus, with flat lobes spreading from a center and hugging the rock). Compared with Candelina mexicana, Poelt noted that the thallus is usually much smaller; marginal lobes are up to about 2 mm long and 0.2–0.5(–1) mm wide, strongly flattened and tightly attached; the surface often has a more reddish-yellow cast and reacts K+ (red) in spot tests. The medulla (the inner, cottony tissue) is entirely white and lacks the yellow needles seen in C. mexicana. Apothecia are about 0.3–0.5 mm across, rather narrowly attached, with flat discs and entire to notched margins. The ascospores are narrowly ellipsoid, and measure 11–15 × 3.3–4.5 μm.

The cortex conforms to the Candelina type: a thin paraplectenchymatous layer capped by a dense, closely cemented band of yellow pigment granules, lacking the "peppered pigment hoods" and flaking hyaline coating that characterise Placomaronea; the medulla is white rather than hollow. Thin-layer chromatography (TLC) shows pulvinic acid derivatives with several chemotypes; most tested specimens of C. submexicana react K+ (red) on the thallus (a few are only weakly K±), consistent with pulvinic series compounds detected on TLC.

=== Similar species ===
Placodioid thalli of Placomaronea placoidea can closely resemble Candelina submexicana in the field. They are most reliably told apart by cortex and medulla: Placomaronea has a thicker, distinctly paraplectenchymatous cortex with inflated apical cells capped by "peppered" pigment hoods, often overlain by a thin, flaking hyaline coating, and its lobes become hollow; Candelina submexicana lacks that hyaline coating and hooded cells, has a compact band of pigment granules over a thinner cortex, and a solid white medulla.

== Habitat and distribution ==
The species is confirmed from Mexico, the southwestern United States (Arizona, New Mexico) and Peru (Department of Ica), based on examined herbarium material. It grows on exposed, non-calcareous rock in sunny, open sites, typically on horizontal to gently sloping faces in warm, dry regions, and the Peruvian gatherings are likewise from open, rocky habitats.
