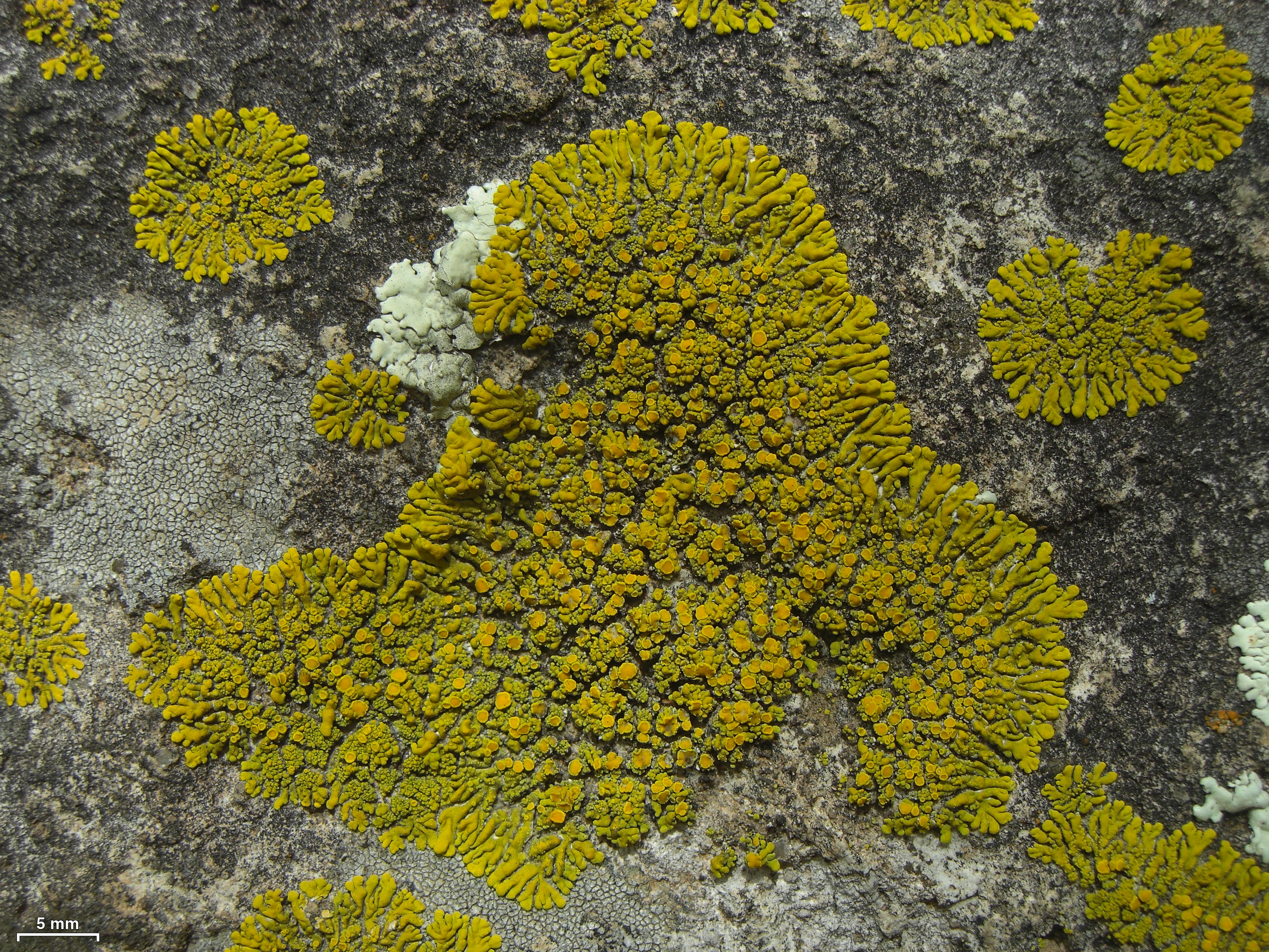
- Candelina submexicana in the Chiricahua Mountains, Arizona, USA

Scientific classification
- Kingdom: Fungi
- Division: Ascomycota
- Class: Candelariomycetes
- Order: Candelariales
- Family: Candelariaceae
- Genus: Candelina; Poelt (1974)

Type species
- Candelina mexicana (B.de Lesd.) Poelt (1974)

Species
- C. africana C. mexicana C. submexicana

= Candelina =

Genus of lichen

Candelina is a small genus of lichen-forming fungi in the family Candelariaceae. It comprises three species of yellow-colored, rock-dwelling crustose lichens. The lichens grow on sun-baked rocks in desert and semi-desert regions in the Americas and south-western Africa.

== Taxonomy ==
Josef Poelt erected Candelina as a new genus in 1974 to segregate a small, anatomically distinct group of bright-yellow, placodioid, rock-dwelling lichens. He diagnosed the genus by its thin but bi-corticate, fragile lobes that are attached by haptera and lack rhizines and soredia; lecanorine apothecia; and eight, 1–2-celled, narrowly ellipsoid ascospores. He selected Placodium mexicanum (originally described by Maurice Bouly de Lesdain in 1914) as the type species under the new combination Candelina mexicana, proposed a neoholotype for that species owing to the destruction of Bouly de Lesdain's herbarium, and at the same time recognized C. submexicana (as a new combination) and described C. africana as new. Poelt also stressed the genus's ecological coherence: species grow on non-calcareous, sun-exposed rock in seasonally hot, arid regions of the Americas and south-west Africa.

Molecular phylogenetic analyses using DNA sequence data from the internal transcribed spacer regions recover Candelina as a well-supported monophyletic group within Candelariaceae, but relationships among the family's major lineages remain only partly resolved given the current gene sampling; recent workers caution against major generic rearrangements until broader multi-locus datasets are available.

== Description ==
The upper cortex of Candelina is distinctive: several layers of hyaline, clearly paraplectenchymatous cells are capped externally by a thick, dense band of yellow pigment granules. Unlike the genus Placomaronea, there is no sloughing, colorless "coating"; the pigment layer sits directly on the cortex, and the lower cortex is well developed where lobes meet the substrate. In keys to the family, Candelina is separated from Candelariella (which has a thinner, looser pigment layer and mostly prosoplectenchymatous cortex) and from Placomaronea (which shows "peppered" pigment hoods on inflated apical cortex cells plus a fragile, hyaline outer residue). These anatomical differences are reliable even when gross thallus form is similar, and they are routinely used to avoid confusion with placodioid Placomaronea species in the Andes.

Chemically, members of Candelina share the family's rather uniform pulvinic acid-based profile. Thin-layer chromatography across multiple specimens recovered pulvinic acid with 4-hydroxypulvinic acid, sometimes accompanied by pulvinic dilacetone and calycin. spot tests on the thallus surface may be K+ (red), weakly reddish, or negative depending on concentration and combination of these metabolites. The chemistry is therefore of limited diagnostic value within the genus compared with cortex anatomy.

== Habitat and distribution ==
Candelina species are saxicolous lichens of warm, arid regions. Poelt described the genus as occurring on sun-exposed, non-calcareous rock, typically on horizontal to sloping faces, and emphasized that the group is characteristic of dry-warm areas in the Americas and south-western Africa.

Within the Americas, Poelt placed Candelina submexicana in the south-western United States and Mexico, and Candelina mexicana from Texas south to Ecuador; he described Candelina africana from south-western Africa (fertile material then unknown). Together these records outline a disjunct range across seasonally hot, open sites on sunlit rock in the New World and south-western Africa.
