= Flavopunctelia lobulata =

Scientific classification
- Domain: Eukaryota
- Kingdom: Fungi
- Division: Ascomycota
- Class: Lecanoromycetes
- Order: Lecanorales
- Family: Parmeliaceae
- Genus: Flavopunctelia
- Species: F. lobulata

Binomial name
- Flavopunctelia lobulata Elix & Adler (1987)

Species of lichen

Flavopunctelia lobulata is a species of foliose lichen in the family Parmeliaceae. Found in Argentina, it was described as a new species in 1987 by lichenologists John Alan Elix and Mónica Adler. The type specimen was collected near Las Pailas (Salta Province), where it was found growing over mosses at an elevation of 2,280 m (7,480 ft). It is similar in appearance to Flavopunctelia praesignis, but differs from that species in being terricolous rather than corticolous, and by its smaller thalli, which measure 4–8 cm (1.6–3.1 in) in diameter. The specific epithet refers to its dense, somewhat erect lobulae (small lobes) in the centre of the thallus.
