= Candelina africana =

Scientific classification
- Kingdom: Fungi
- Division: Ascomycota
- Class: Candelariomycetes
- Order: Candelariales
- Family: Candelariaceae
- Genus: Candelina
- Species: C. africana

Binomial name
- Candelina africana Poelt (1974)

Species of lichen

Candelina africana is a species of saxicolous (rock-dwelling) crustose lichen in the family Candelariaceae. This bright yellow lichen forms small, flower-like patches on rock surfaces and is currently known only from a single location in Namibia, making it one of the rarer members of its genus. It grows on a type of metamorphic rock called mica-schist in the desert landscapes of southwestern Africa.

== Taxonomy ==
Josef Poelt described Candelina africana as new to science in his 1974 revision of Candelariaceae. He designated a type collection from Gamsberg Pass, south of Windhoek in south-western Africa (now Namibia), on mica-schist, gathered in March 1970 by E.D. Schulze (Poelt 9445).

Recent family-level molecular phylogenetics work recovers Candelina as a well-supported monophyletic clade (ITS-based), distinct from Placomaronea. A 2024 eco‐phylogenetic study of Trebouxia (a common green algal photobiont in lichens) in southern Africa noted that their study provided the first molecular data for several lichen species, including Candelina africana.

== Description ==
The thallus (lichen body) forms small rosettes that often coalesce into broader patches. Marginal lobes are flattened, usually about 1–1.5 mm long and 0.3–0.5 mm wide, and irregularly divided. The inner parts of the thallus are densely packed with overlapping (imbricate), very small secondary lobes, giving a tile-like appearance. The upper surface is smooth and intensely yellow. The medulla (inner tissue) is golden yellow, but often whitish toward the base. Apothecia (disc-like fruit bodies) are unknown in this species; pycnidia (asexual structures) are immersed in the thallus and may appear as tiny reddish bumps at the surface. In anatomy the species matches the generic pattern for Candelina; its medulla is somewhat denser than in C. mexicana; reported pycnospores are about 2–2.5 × 1–1.5 μm. Poelt separated C. africana from C. mexicana by its generally smaller size, more strongly flattened lobes, the medulla turning white toward the base, and the conspicuously fine subdivision of the inner thallus into minute secondary lobes.

== Habitat and distribution ==
Poelt knew the species only from the type locality at Gamsberg Pass, south-western Africa (Namibia), where it grew on mica-schist. In his key he placed C. africana as the South-West African member of the genus, characterised by flattened lobes and a medulla that is yellow only in the upper part.
