= Placomaronea minima =

Scientific classification
- Kingdom: Fungi
- Division: Ascomycota
- Class: Candelariomycetes
- Order: Candelariales
- Family: Candelariaceae
- Genus: Placomaronea
- Species: P. minima

Binomial name
- Placomaronea minima M.Westb. & Frödén (2009)
- Holotype site: Región Metropolitana de Santiago, Chile

Species of lichen

Placomaronea minima is a species of saxicolous (rock-dwelling) crustose lichen in the family Candelariaceae. Found in South America and Southern Africa, it was formally described as a new species in 2009 by lichenologists Martin Westberg and Patrik Frödén. The type specimen was collected by the second author from the Santiago Metropolitan Region (Chile) at an altitude of about 1,200 m (3,900 ft), where it was found growing on rocks on a hill outside of San José de Maipo. The species epithet minima refers to its small size.

== Description ==
Placomaronea minima has a crustose thallus made up of individual areoles that form an expanding crust. These areoles, particularly at the margins, tend to have a slightly squamulose structure and can sometimes develop small lobes that rise from the base, growing up to about 1 mm in length. The surface of the thallus has a yellow, smooth, and glossy appearance, and it does not have any pruina. The thallus structure is quite compact, with an absent medulla and green algae filling its interior. The lower cortex is mainly evident near the margins of elevated squamules and essentially extends from the upper cortex.

The lichen's apothecia, or fruiting structures, measure between 0.2 and 1.3 mm in diameter. The discs are a darker shade of yellow than the thallus and have a smooth surface that is pruinose due to granular epihymenial pigments. Their margins are clear, somewhat uneven, and rise above the disc, reaching a thickness of up to 0.15 mm. In terms of anatomy, these thalline margins have a cortex that mirrors that of the thallus and measures between 15 and 25 μm in thickness. The epihymenium does not form hood-like structures over the tips of the paraphyses. The hymenium stands 90–120 μm tall. The paraphyses can either be simple or show some branching close to their tips, expanding to 4 μm at their widest point. The asci contain more than 30 spores, and they measure 52–80 by 18–30 μm. The ascospores are clear, primarily simple (though occasionally with a single septum), and are shaped like narrow ellipsoids, measuring around 8.5–11 by 3.0–4.0 μm. The lichen has numerous pycnidia, which are easily identified as tiny orange protuberances on the thallus. These pycnidia produce conidia that are narrowly ellipsoid in shape, with sizes ranging from 2.5 to 4.0 by 1.5 μm.

== Habitat and distribution ==
Placomaronea minima has a disjunct distribution, being found in both Chile and Argentina, as well as in southern Africa (Lesotho). In its type locality in central Chile it thrives on rock formations situated on semi-arid, partially exposed hill slopes.
