= Flavopunctelia darrowii =

Scientific classification
- Domain: Eukaryota
- Kingdom: Fungi
- Division: Ascomycota
- Class: Lecanoromycetes
- Order: Lecanorales
- Family: Parmeliaceae
- Genus: Flavopunctelia
- Species: F. darrowii

Binomial name
- Flavopunctelia darrowii (J.W.Thomson) Hale (1984)

Synonyms
- Parmelia darrowi J.W.Thomson (1950); Punctelia darrowi (J.W.Thomson) Krog (1982)

Species of lichen

Flavopunctelia darrowii is a species of foliose lichen in the family Parmeliaceae. It was first formally described as a new species by John Walter Thomson in 1950 as Parmelia darrowi. It is named after American botanist Robert Arthur Darrow. In 1982, Hildur Krog transferred it to the subgenus Flavopunctelia of her newly circumscribed genus Punctelia, created to contain Parmelia species with punctate (point-like) pseudocyphellae. Mason Hale raised this subgenus to generic status a couple of years later.

The lichen is endemic to the American oak-pine forests of southern Arizona and higher elevations in Chihuahua and Sonora, Mexico.
