= Flavopunctelia borrerioides =

Scientific classification
- Domain: Eukaryota
- Kingdom: Fungi
- Division: Ascomycota
- Class: Lecanoromycetes
- Order: Lecanorales
- Family: Parmeliaceae
- Genus: Flavopunctelia
- Species: F. borrerioides

Binomial name
- Flavopunctelia borrerioides Kurok. (1999)

Species of lichen

Flavopunctelia borrerioides is a species of foliose lichen in the family Parmeliaceae. It was described as a new species by Japanese lichenologist Syo Kurokawa in 1999. The type specimen was collected by Mexican mycologist Gastón Guzmán from Monte de la Candelaria at an altitude of about 2,400 m (7,900 ft). There it was found growing in a forest containing predominantly Juniper, Opuntia, and Agave. The lichen is found in Peru, Mexico, and India.
