= Placomaronea mendozae =

Scientific classification
- Domain: Eukaryota
- Kingdom: Fungi
- Division: Ascomycota
- Class: Candelariomycetes
- Order: Candelariales
- Family: Candelariaceae
- Genus: Placomaronea
- Species: P. mendozae

Binomial name
- Placomaronea mendozae (Räsänen) M.Westb. (2004)

Synonyms
- Candelariella vitellina var. mendozae Räsänen (1941)

Species of lichen

Placomaronea mendozae is a species of saxicolous (rock-dwelling) crustose lichen in the family Candelariaceae. Found in South America and the United States, it was formally described as a new species in 1941 by Finnish lichenologist Veli Räsänen. The type specimen was collected in Las Heras, Mendoza (Argentina) in 1939. Räsänen named it as a variety of Candelariella vitellina; Martin Westberg promoted the taxon to distinct species status in 2004. The lichen occurs along the Andes in Argentina and Peru, and in Arizona, USA. It is the only Placomaronea that has been found in North America.
