= Placomaronea kaernefeltii =

Scientific classification
- Kingdom: Fungi
- Division: Ascomycota
- Class: Candelariomycetes
- Order: Candelariales
- Family: Candelariaceae
- Genus: Placomaronea
- Species: P. kaernefeltii

Binomial name
- Placomaronea kaernefeltii M.Westb., Frödén & Wedin (2009)
- Holotype site: Tarapacá, Chile

Species of lichen

Placomaronea kaernefeltii is a rare species of saxicolous (rock-dwelling) lichen in the family Candelariaceae. Found in South America, it was formally described as a new species in 2009 by lichenologists Martin Westberg, Patrik Frödén, and Mats Wedin. The type specimen was collected by the second author from Arica (Chile), between Socoroma and Putre, at an altitude of 3,750 m (12,300 ft), where it was found growing along cracks and pits on a siliceous boulder in a dry mountain slope. The lichen is only known to occur at its type locality, although the authors suggest a wider distribution is likely. The species epithet honours Swedish lichenologist Ingvar Kärnefelt.

== Description ==
Placomaronea kaernefeltii has a distinct appearance, with its thallus transitioning from a crust-like structure to one with raised edges resembling lobes. It begins as bumpy areoles and soon becomes more lobate, elevated from its base. These lobes can grow up to 1.5 mm in length and 1.0 mm in width. These growths, often twice as long as they are wide, can either be isolated or crowd together to resemble rosettes. Their surface has a vibrant yellow colour, smooth texture, and matte appearance.

The lichen's underside might appear white or take on a brownish hue from accumulated dust. It lacks an epicortex, with pigments forming protective layers over the outermost cortex cells. The cortex itself is 15–45 μm thick. Instead of a distinct medulla, green algae predominantly fill the interior, and the lower cortex mirrors the upper one in texture but ranges from 20 to 35 μm in thickness.

The apothecia of the lichen, with a diameter ranging from 0.8 to 1.7 mm, have a flat disc that matches the bright yellow hue of the thallus. These discs are smooth with a slightly powdery (pruinose) surface, surrounded by a smooth margin that might develop a slightly uneven texture over time. This margin is not notably elevated from the disc and is anatomically similar to the lichen's cortex, measuring about 45–50 μm in thickness.

Within the apothecia, the hymenium stands 90–105 μm tall. Its paraphyses are simple, though some branch near their tips, ending in either cylindrical or club-shaped formations up to 4.5 μm wide. The asci contain more than 30 spores and measure between 63–70 μm in length and 20–22 μm in width. The spores themselves are simple, elongated, typically ranging from 11–14 μm in length and 3.5–4.0 μm in width. No pycnidia have been observed in this lichen species.
