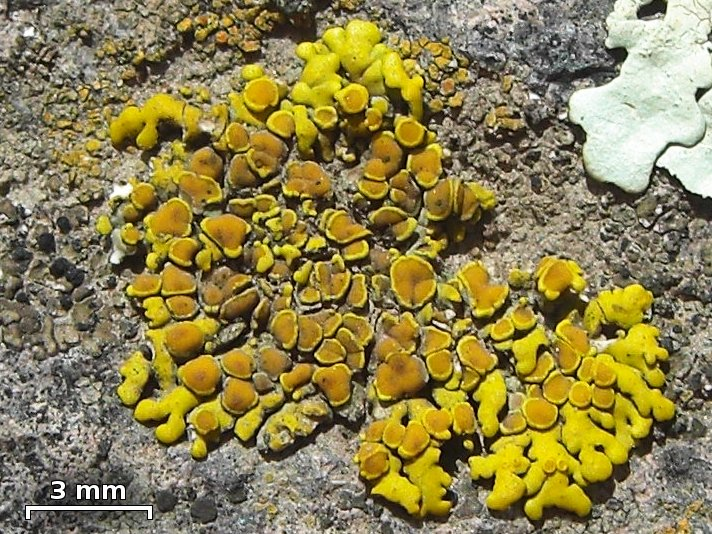
- in Ollantaytambo, Peru

Scientific classification
- Kingdom: Fungi
- Division: Ascomycota
- Class: Candelariomycetes
- Order: Candelariales
- Family: Candelariaceae
- Genus: Placomaronea
- Species: P. candelarioides

Binomial name
- Placomaronea candelarioides Räsänen (1944)

Synonyms
- Placomaronea candelarioides var. lacinulata R.Sant. (1944)

= Placomaronea candelarioides =

Species of lichen

Placomaronea candelarioides is a species of saxicolous (rock-dwelling), foliose lichen in the family Candelariaceae. It is found in South America. This lichen species can be recognised by its distinct umbilicate (single attachment point), monophyllous (single lobe) growth form. It was first described in 1944 by the Finnish scientist Veli Räsänen from specimens collected in Argentina, and serves as the type species for its genus. The lichen grows on acidic rocks in mountainous regions along the Andes, from Argentina north to Peru, typically at elevations between about 2,000 and 4,000 meters.

== Taxonomy ==
Placomaronea candelarioides was formally described as a new species in 1944 by Finnish lichenologist Veli Räsänen. It is the type species of the genus Placomaronea, which was circumscribed by Räsänen to contain this species. The type specimen of P. candelarioides was found in Mendoza, Argentina. A variety of this lichen, Placomaronea candelarioides var. lacinulata, was proposed by Rolf Santesson in 1944.

Räsänen originally placed Placomaronea with the family Acarosporaceae, but later authors transferred it to Candelariaceae; Poelt argued this placement better reflects its chemistry, hyphal structure, spore form and spore counts, which match Candelaria/Candelariella rather than the Acarosporaceae. Poelt also treated Santesson's "var. lacinulata" as no more than morphotypic variation (more separated lobes; darker lobe tips likely artefactual), not a distinct taxon.

== Description ==
Placomaronea candelarioides has a leaf-like (foliose) structure, uniquely anchored by a single point, a trait referred to as umbilicate and monophyllous. Though most specimens adhere to this typical appearance, some have shown variations, such as having numerous individual, little branched, and ascending lobes that attach to the substratum at the base. The lichen's overall shape is circular and can span up to 20 mm (13/16 in) across. It has extensions or lobes that radiate from its centre, each measuring between 0.4 and 1.7 mm in width and potentially growing up to 7 mm in length. These lobes sometimes have smaller offshoots or lobules and can occasionally take on a round shape, layering over each other and forming cushion-like clusters. The color of the lichen's upper surface ranges from dark yellow to brownish-yellow, presenting a smooth, shiny, and unpigmented appearance. The lichen's underside can display colors from white to grey or even brown, influenced by the dust it accumulates.

Prominently, the lichen's apothecia appear as darker yellow spots that often densely populate the central regions of the lichen. They sit raised on the surface, measure between 0.5 and 1.6 mm in diameter, and sometimes have a slightly jagged or crenulate edge. Internally, the lichen comprises several layers. Just beneath the surface, there is a cortex layer about 15–35 μm thick. Below this, a white layer of medulla. The base of the lichen has another cortical layer, which is similar in structure but slightly thicker, ranging between 25 and 45 μm.

Each ascus holds over 30 ascospores. These spores are narrowly oval in shape, measuring between 8–12.5 μm in length and 3–4 μm in width. Another distinguishing feature is the presence of pycnidia, which appear as darker yellow dimples on the lichen's surface.

In chemical spot tests, the lichen reacts weakly red when a solution of potassium hydroxide (K) is applied, a feature helpful for its identification.

== Habitat and distribution ==
Placomaronea candelarioides grows on non-calcareous, acidic rocks in open montane settings. It is recorded along the Andes, from Mendoza (Argentina) north to Peru's Ancash region. Poelt documented material from several Andean provinces and elevations: in Argentina from Mendoza (Dept. Luján: Estancia El Salto; Los Vallecitos, both roughly 2,800 m (9,200 ft)), and Tucumán (Valle de Tafí: Tafí del Valle, 1,978 m (6,490 ft), on granite boulders in a dry river bed; Carapunco/Infiernillo, 2,800 m (9,200 ft), on schistose rock), as well as Jujuy (Puna, Dept. Santa Catalina, 3,400 to 4,300 m (11,200 to 14,100 ft)). He also cited Peruvian material from Junín (Huancayo, Sapallanga, 11,000 to 12,000 ft (3,400 to 3,700 m)) on exposed outcrops in a dry, "desert" setting. The species may occur with Polycauliona candelaria, suggesting tolerance of nitrogen-enriched sites.
