= Placomaronea lambii =

Scientific classification
- Domain: Eukaryota
- Kingdom: Fungi
- Division: Ascomycota
- Class: Candelariomycetes
- Order: Candelariales
- Family: Candelariaceae
- Genus: Placomaronea
- Species: P. lambii

Binomial name
- Placomaronea lambii (Hakul.) R.Sant. (1974)

Synonyms
- Candelariella lambii Hakul. (1954)

Species of lichen

Placomaronea lambii is a species of saxicolous (rock-dwelling) lichen in the family Candelariaceae. It occurs at high altitudes in Argentina, Ecuador, and Peru, where it grows on acidic rocks in open habitats.

== Taxonomy ==
The lichen was first scientifically described as a new species in 1965 by Finnish lichenologist Rainar Hakulinen, who placed it in the genus Candelariella. Rolf Santesson transferred it to Placomaronea in 1974. The species epithet lambi honours polar explorer and lichenologist Elke Mackenzie (formerly Lamb), who collected the type specimen from the Tafí del Valle (Tucumán Province, Argentina, in 1947. There, in an alpine pasture at an altitude of 3,100 m (10,200 ft), it was found growing on a block of schistose rock.

== Description ==
Placomaronea lambii has a distinct rosette-like form, comprising numerous brownish-yellow lobes that can be multi-lobed and overlapping. The thallus has a dull brownish-yellow hue, while its reproductive structures, or apothecia, stand out with a darker yellow disc and the pycnidia (asexual spores) appear as darker yellow to slightly brownish depressions or bumps. Its ascospores are narrowly ellipsoid to nearly oblong, and typically measure 9.0–12.0 long by 3.0–4.5 μm wide.
