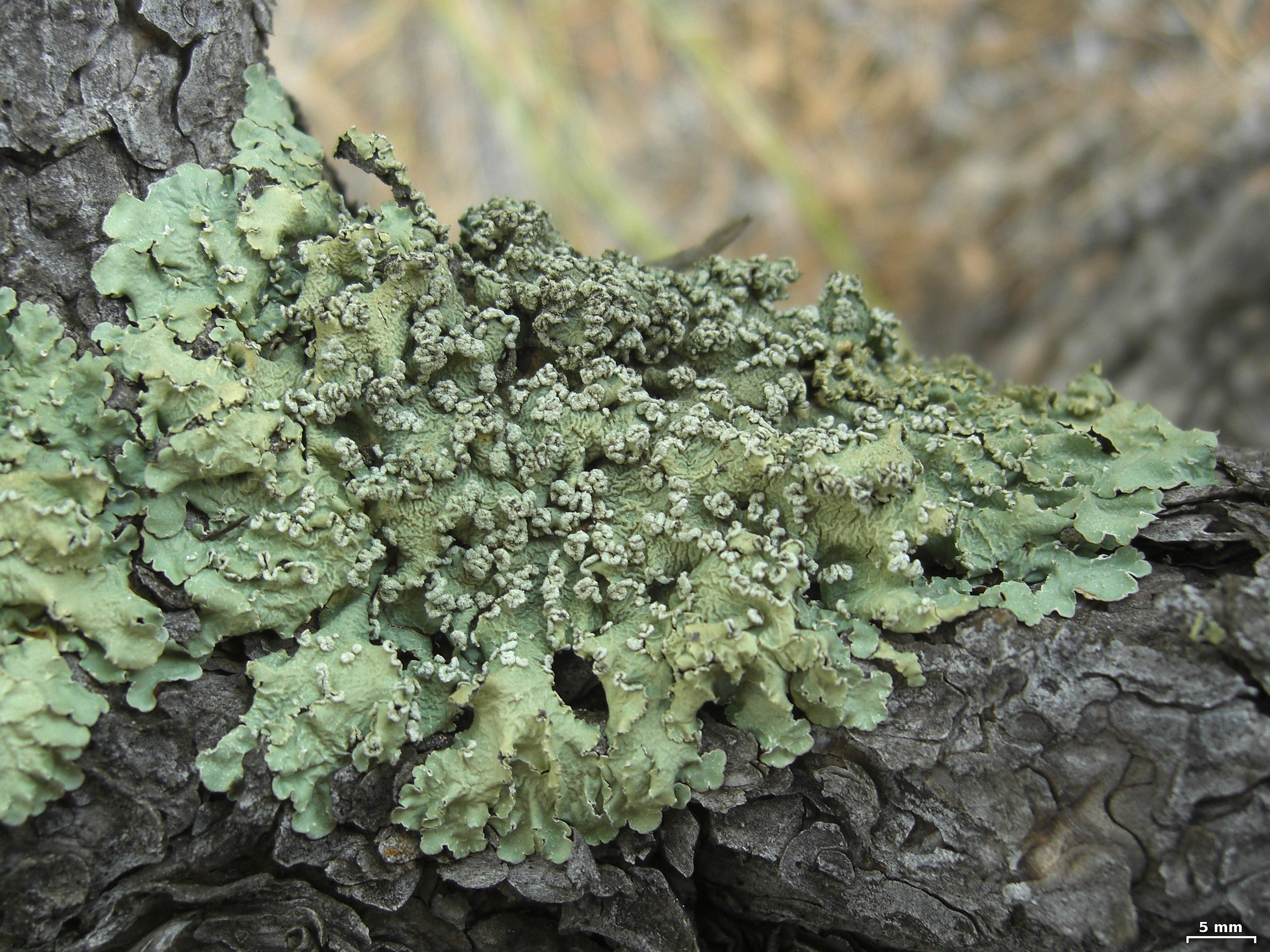
- In Charles M. Russell National Wildlife Refuge, Montana, USA

Conservation status
- Apparently Secure (NatureServe)

Scientific classification
- Kingdom: Fungi
- Division: Ascomycota
- Class: Lecanoromycetes
- Order: Lecanorales
- Family: Parmeliaceae
- Genus: Flavopunctelia
- Species: F. soredica

Binomial name
- Flavopunctelia soredica (Nyl.) Hale (1984)

Synonyms
- Parmelia soredica Nyl. (1872); Punctelia soredica (Nyl.) Krog (1982)

= Flavopunctelia soredica =

Species of lichen

Flavopunctelia soredica is a species of foliose lichen in the family Parmeliaceae. It was first described as Parmelia soredica by Finnish botanist William Nylander in 1872. In 1982, Hildur Krog transferred it to the subgenus Flavopunctelia of her newly circumscribed genus Punctelia, created to contain Parmelia species with punctate (point-like) pseudocyphellae. Mason Hale raised this subgenus to generic status a couple of years later. The lichen is colloquially known as the powder-edged speckled greenshield. It is widely distributed, having been recorded from North America, South America, South Africa, India, Russia, China and Japan.
