= Placomaronea fuegiana =

Scientific classification
- Kingdom: Fungi
- Division: Ascomycota
- Class: Candelariomycetes
- Order: Candelariales
- Family: Candelariaceae
- Genus: Placomaronea
- Species: P. fuegiana

Binomial name
- Placomaronea fuegiana M.Westb. & Frödén (2009)
- Holotype site: Tierra del Fuego, Argentina

Species of lichen

Placomaronea fuegiana is a species of saxicolous (rock-dwelling), crustose lichen in the family Candelariaceae. Found in South America, it was formally described as a new species in 2009 by Martin Westberg and Patrik Frödén. The type specimen was collected by the second author in Tierra del Fuego, Argentina, where it was found growing on sandstone. The species epithet fuegiana refers to the type locality. It also occurs in Pali-Aike National Park, where it grows in the pits of volcanic rocks.

== Description ==
The lichen body, or thallus, is crust-like in nature. It initially starts as scattered to crowded areoles that first manifest as small granules. These then develop into rounded, raised (bullate) areoles. As they mature, they may turn irregular in shape, with some areas slightly incised, reaching widths of up to 0.6 mm. The larger ones may look almost lobate but do not elevate from the underlying surface. The thallus has a yellow, smooth, slightly glossy appearance and is devoid of pruina. Its cortex, the outer layer, is 15–25 μm thick, with cells approximately 4–8 μm wide. An indistinct medulla is present, with algae distributed throughout the interior. The lichen lacks a lower cortex.

Apothecia, the fruiting bodies of the lichen, are abundant. They start as immersed structures in the thallus, later emerging through cracks. Once mature, they sit atop the thallus, with diameters ranging between 0.4–1.5 mm. Their thalline margins are entire and slightly irregular, reaching up to 0.10 mm in thickness. In mature stages, the disc often hides these margins. Initially flat, the disc eventually becomes convex, with a slightly darker yellow hue than the thallus and a smooth to somewhat coarse texture. Its surface may also be faintly pruinose. The margin of the apothecia has a cortex resembling that of the thallus, measuring 10–25 μm thick. Within, the hymenium (fertile layer) stands 90–100 μm tall. Its paraphyses, or filamentous cells, are primarily simple but may occasionally branch near the tips, measuring 1.5–2.0 μm in the mid-hymenium and expanding to 4 μm at the tips. The asci, or spore-producing structures, house more than 30 spores and are sized between 58–70 by 22–25 μm. The produced ascospores are simple, narrowly ellipsoid in shape, ranging from 9.5–13 by 3.5–4.0 μm in size. Pycnidia, the asexual fruiting structures, are sparse and can be spotted as orange, shallow indentations on the thallus. Their conidia (asexual spores), are narrowly ellipsoid, measuring 3–4 by 1.5 μm.
