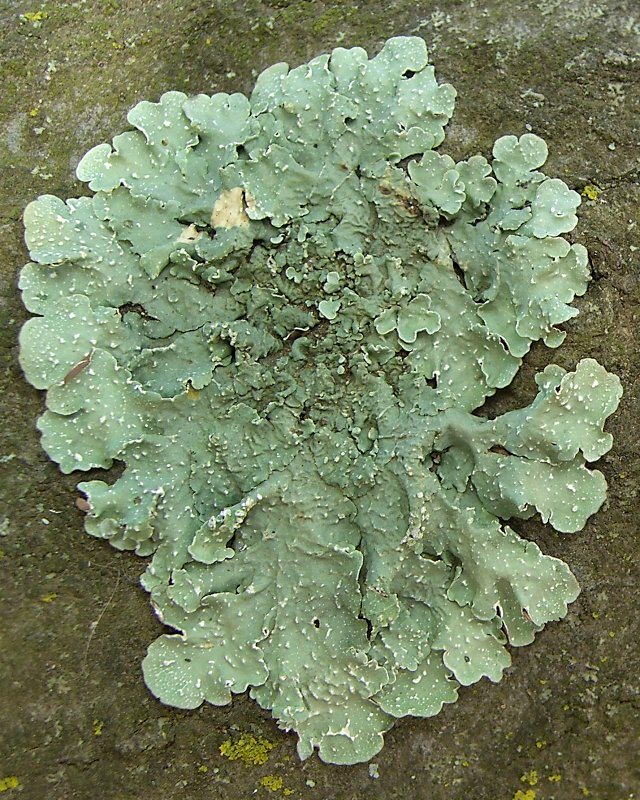

Conservation status
- Secure (NatureServe)

Scientific classification
- Kingdom: Fungi
- Division: Ascomycota
- Class: Lecanoromycetes
- Order: Lecanorales
- Family: Parmeliaceae
- Genus: Flavopunctelia
- Species: F. flaventior

Binomial name
- Flavopunctelia flaventior (Stirt.) Hale (1984)

Synonyms
- Parmelia flaventior Stirt. (1877); Punctelia flaventior (Stirt.) Krog (1982)

= Flavopunctelia flaventior =

Species of lichen-forming fungus

Flavopunctelia flaventior is a species of foliose lichen in the family Parmeliaceae. It was first formally described as a new species by James Stirton in 1877 as Parmelia flaventior. In 1982, Hildur Krog transferred it to the subgenus Flavopunctelia of her newly circumscribed genus Punctelia, created to contain Parmelia species with punctate (point-like) pseudocyphellae. Mason Hale raised this subgenus to generic status a couple of years later, setting Flavopunctelia flaventior as the type species of the new genus. The lichen is commonly known as the speckled greenshield. Flavopunctelia flaventior occurs in Asia, Europe, East Africa, North America, and South America. In Nepal, Flavopunctelia flaventior has been reported from 2,250 to 2,800 m elevation in a compilation of published records.
