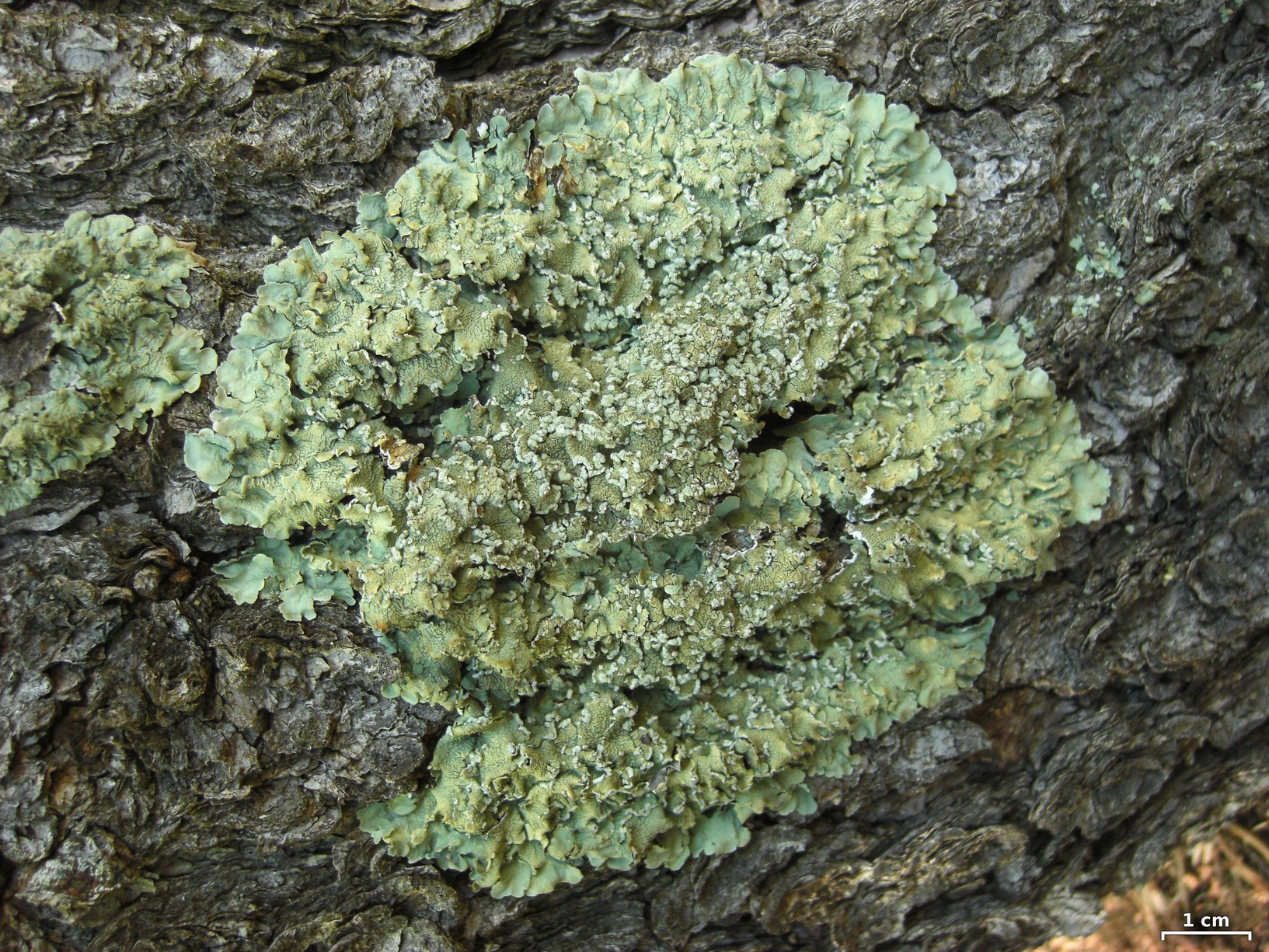
- Flavopunctelia soredica

Scientific classification
- Domain: Eukaryota
- Kingdom: Fungi
- Division: Ascomycota
- Class: Lecanoromycetes
- Order: Lecanorales
- Family: Parmeliaceae
- Genus: Flavopunctelia (Krog) Hale (1984)

Type species
- Flavopunctelia flaventior (Stirt.) Hale (1984)

Species
- F. borrerioides F. darrowii F. flaventior F. lobulata F. praesignis F. soredica

Synonyms
- Punctelia subgen. Flavopunctelia Krog (1982)

= Flavopunctelia =

Genus of fungi

Flavopunctelia is a genus of foliose lichens in the family Parmeliaceae. The genus contains species that are widespread in temperate and tropical areas. The genus is characterised by broad, yellow-green lobes, point-like (punctiform) pseudocyphellae on the thallus surface, and bifusiform conidia (i.e., threadlike with a swelling at both ends). All species contain usnic acid as a major secondary chemical in the cortex. Flavopunctelia was originally conceived as a subgenus of Punctelia by Hildur Krog in 1982; Mason Hale promoted it to generic status in 1984.

== Species ==
- Flavopunctelia borrerioides Kurok. (1999)
- Flavopunctelia darrowii (J.W.Thomson) Hale (1984)
- Flavopunctelia flaventior (Stirt.) Hale (1984)
- Flavopunctelia lobulata Elix & Adler (1987)
- Flavopunctelia praesignis (Nyl.) Hale (1984)
- Flavopunctelia soredica (Nyl.) Hale (1984)
