= Robert Shaw Egan =

American botanist and lichenologist

Robert S. Egan
- Born: 1945 (age 80–81); Buffalo, New York
- Education: University of Colorado Boulder
- Scientific career
- Fields: Lichenology
- Workplaces: University of Nebraska Omaha
- Thesis: A floristic study of alpine lichens from Colorado and New Mexico (1971)
- Author abbrev. (botany): Egan

Robert "Bob" Shaw Egan (born 1945) is a botanist and lichenologist, specializing in the family Parmeliaceae. He was the president of the American Bryological and Lichenological Society from 1999 to 2001.

== Education and career ==
Robert S. Egan graduated from the University of Colorado Boulder in 1967 with B.A., in 1969 with M.A., and in 1971 with Ph.D. He became an assistant professor at Castleton State College (now called Castleton University) and then from 1975 to 1979 was a faculty member at Texas A&M University. At the University of Nebraska Omaha he joined the faculty in 1979, was promoted to full professor in 1985, and retired there as professor emeritus. From 1989 to 1992 he was the chair of the botany department.

Egan has collected lichens in the U.S., Canada, Mexico, Puerto Rico, Costa Rica, and Guatemala. He is the author or co-author of over 100 scientific publications. He maintains a lichen herbarium with about 17,000 specimens, together with a lichen exchange program. His recent research has focused on "floristic and taxonomic studies of the lichens of Wyoming's Snowy Range, the Big Thicket National Preserve in East Texas, and the Lichen family Parmeliaceae in Mexico."

== Eponyms ==
- Buellia eganii Bungartz
- Xanthoparmelia eganii Elix & T.H.Nash

== Selected publications ==
- Egan, Robert S. (1970). "Alpine Lichens from Mt. Audubon, Boulder County, Colorado". The Bryologist. 73 (2): 385–389. doi:10.2307/3241265. JSTOR 3241265.
- Egan, Robert S. (1970). "Additions to the Lichen Flora of New Mexico". The Bryologist. 73 (1): 143–145. doi:10.1639/0007-2745(1970)73[143:ATTLFO]2.0.CO;2. JSTOR 3241593.
- Egan, Robert S. (1971). "Additions to the Lichen Flora of New Mexico. II". The Bryologist. 74 (3): 387–390. doi:10.2307/3241654. JSTOR 3241654.
- Egan, Robert S. (1976). "New and Additional Lichen Records from Texas". The Bryologist. 79 (2): 224–226. doi:10.2307/3241918. JSTOR 3241918.
- Egan, Robert S. (1977). "New and Additional Lichen Records from Texas. II". The Bryologist. 80 (1): 136–142. doi:10.2307/3242519. JSTOR 3242519.
- Egan, Robert S. (1982). "Parmotrema arteagum, a New Lichen Species from Mexico". The Bryologist. 85 (1): 79–83. doi:10.2307/3243143. JSTOR 3243143.
- Egan, Robert S. (1986). "Correlations and Non-Correlations of Chemical Variation Patterns with Lichen Morphology and Geography". The Bryologist. 89 (2): 99–110. doi:10.2307/3242750. JSTOR 3242750.
- Egan, Robert S. (1987). "A Fifth Checklist of the Lichen-Forming, Lichenicolous and Allied Fungi of the Continental United States and Canada". The Bryologist. 90 (2): 77–173. doi:10.2307/3242609. JSTOR 3242609.
- Esslinger, Theodore L.; Egan, Robert S. (1995). "A Sixth Checklist of the Lichen-forming, Lichenicolous, and Allied Fungi of the Continental United States and Canada". The Bryologist. 98 (4): 467–549. doi:10.2307/3243586. JSTOR 3243586.
- Egan, Robert S. (2003). "What is the Lichen Parmelia graminicola B. De Lesd.?". The Bryologist. 106 (2): 314–316. doi:10.1639/0007-2745(2003)106[0314:WITLPG]2.0.CO;2. ISSN 0007-2745.
- Egan, Robert S.; Harms, Robert; Widhelm, Todd (2005). "Studies on the Lichen Parmotrema rigidums. lat. from North and South America". The Bryologist. 108 (3): 402–405. doi:10.1639/0007-2745(2005)108[0402:SOTLPR]2.0.CO;2. ISSN 0007-2745.
- Pérez-Pérez, Rosa E.; Egan, Robert S.; Nash, Tom H.; Elix, John A. (2011). "Parmotrema mirandum (Hale) Hale: a revised chemistry and new records from Guerrero and Morelos, Mexico". The Bryologist. 114 (3): 474–476. doi:10.1639/0007-2745-114.3.474.
- Widhelm, Todd J.; Egan, Robert S.; Bertoletti, Francesca R.; Asztalos, Matt J.; Kraichak, Ekaphan; Leavitt, Steven D.; Lumbsch, H. Thorsten (2016). "Picking holes in traditional species delimitations: an integrative taxonomic reassessment of the Parmotrema perforatum group (Parmeliaceae, Ascomycota)". Botanical Journal of the Linnean Society. 182 (4): 868–884. doi:10.1111/boj.12483. ISSN 0024-4074.

== See also ==
- Category:Taxa named by Robert Shaw Egan
