= Arsène Brouard =

French botanist (1867 - 1938)

Arsène Gustave Joseph Brouard (1867 - 1938), also known as Gustave Arsène or Gerfroy Arsène, was a member of the Christian Brothers order (Frères des écoles chrétiennes) and a French botanist and scientific plant collector who worked extensively in Mexico and northern New Mexico.

== Biography ==
Arsène was born near Orléans, France. Upon becoming a Christian Brother, Arsène took the name Brother Gerfroy Arsène. He left for Mexico in 1906. He taught for eight years in Puebla, Morelia, Mexico City, and Queretaro. He, with his students, often walked up to 30 miles a day collecting specimens of lichens, mosses, ferns, and flowering plants. Early in the Mexican Revolution he left the country. Arsène traveled to the U.S. via Cuba and taught for a few years each in New York, Pennsylvania, Maryland, and Louisiana.

Arsène came to New Mexico in 1926. He taught at the Sacred Heart Training College in Las Vegas, NM, and St. Michael’s College in Santa Fe, NM, and collected extensively.

== Legacy ==
24 species were named for Brouard. His herbarium has been integrated into the University of New Mexico collection. Arsène was an internationally known collector, and 20,000 of his specimens are preserved worldwide. He shipped specimens to experts for identification, inclusion in research herbaria, and sales to collectors. Prince Roland Bonaparte eagerly purchased Arsène’s herbarium sheets. In all, Arsène collected nearly 200 new species. Paul Carpenter Standley of the Field Museum wrote, "Brother Arsène’s contributions to botanical knowledge of Mexico are monumental. They will endure as long as the science itself remains."
