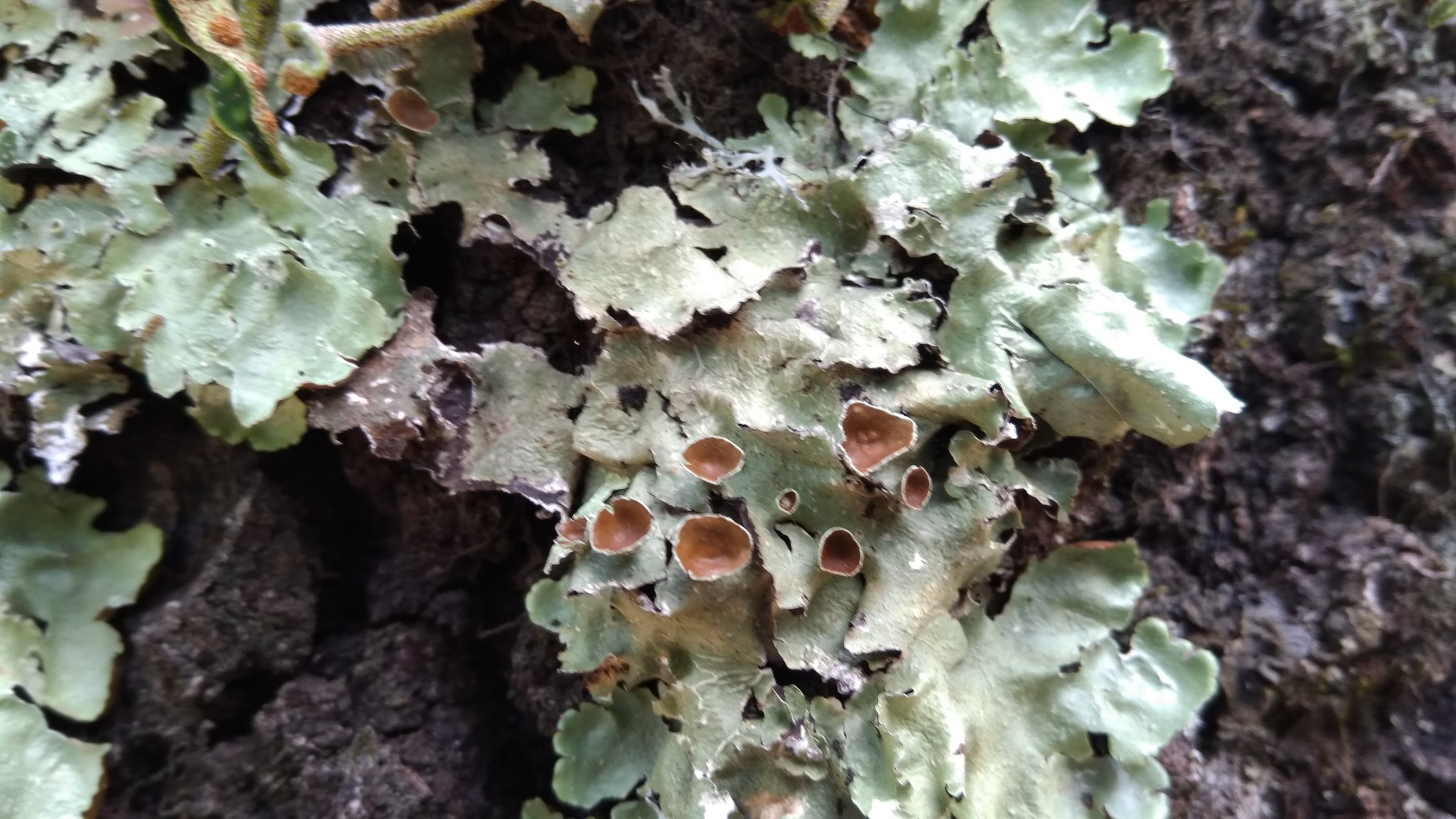

Conservation status
- Apparently Secure (NatureServe)

Scientific classification
- Kingdom: Fungi
- Division: Ascomycota
- Class: Lecanoromycetes
- Order: Lecanorales
- Family: Parmeliaceae
- Genus: Flavopunctelia
- Species: F. praesignis

Binomial name
- Flavopunctelia praesignis (Nyl.) Hale (1984)

Synonyms
- Parmelia praesignis Nyl. (1872); Punctelia praesignis (Nyl.) Krog (1982)

= Flavopunctelia praesignis =

Species of lichen

Flavopunctelia praesignis is a species of foliose lichen in the family Parmeliaceae. It was first described as Parmelia praesignis by Finnish botanist William Nylander in 1872. In 1982, Hildur Krog transferred it to the subgenus Flavopunctelia of her newly circumscribed genus Punctelia, created to contain Parmelia species with punctate (point-like) pseudocyphellae. Mason Hale raised this subgenus to generic status a couple of years later. The lichen is colloquially known as the fruiting speckled greenshield. It is found in the southern United States, in various states of Mexico, and in South America. It has also been reported from Kenya, but that may be due to misidentification.

A study on the post‐fire recolonization of dominant epiphytic lichen species on silverleaf oak determined that the primary means of recolonization for F. praesignis is fragmentation. In the thalli of partially burned lichens, the bleached portion fell off the tree leaving the green, metabolically active parts of the thallus remaining, thus creating space for recolonization as well as regeneration of remaining fragments.
