= Maurice Bouly de Lesdain =

French botanist and lichenologist (1869–1965)

- Born: 20 September 1869; Dunkirk, France
- Died: 3 January 1965 (aged 95); Lille, France
- Scientific career
- Fields: Lichenology
- Author abbrev. (botany): B.de Lesd.

Maurice Léopold Joseph Bouly de Lesdain (20 September 1869–3 January 1965) was a French botanist and lichenologist.

== Early life and career ==
Bouly de Lesdain was born in Dunkirk on 20 September 1869. He did his classical studies at the Jesuit college in Boulogne-sur-Mer, then his medical studies in Paris where he obtained his doctorate in 1894. At the same time, he had enrolled in the University of Paris for a degree in natural history, which he completed in 1896. With Jean-Nicolas Boulay he edited the exsiccata series Rubi praesertim Galliae exsiccati (1894-1901). During his studies in Paris, he worked with French botanist Gaston Bonnier, who had succeeded in the experimental resynthesis of lichens; Bouly de Lesdain's biographer Henry Nicollon des Abbayes suggested that it was this early collaboration that strengthened his desire to work in the field of lichenology. In 1910, Bouly de Lesdain defended his research thesis for a doctorate in Natural Sciences, which was about the lichens near Dunkirk. Around this time he settled in Dunkirk as a practicing physician, but devoted his spare time to the study of natural history. In the following decades, he went on many excursions to collect samples for his personal herbarium, and maintained correspondence with several leading French and foreign lichenologists, with whom he exchanged publications and specimens.

In 1940, during the Second World War, his home in Dunkirk, and his private herbarium and library were destroyed during the Battle of Dunkirk. He took refuge in Paris, where he joined the team of the cryptogam laboratory of the French National Museum of Natural History. His main work in lichenology was the systematic study of lichens, determination and description of their rare and exotic forms, in particular those of Cuba, Guadeloupe, New Mexico, and the Kerguelen Archipelago. He described several new species in the genus Caloplaca. He also published research on groupings of seed plants as well as on mosses and fungi. His destroyed herbarium contained many original lichen type specimens that had been sent to him by Gustave Arsène Brouard from Cuba, Mexico and New Mexico. One of these species was Parmelia graminicola; because of the loss of the type, the name languished, unused, until an isotype (duplicate) of Brouard's original collections of the lichen was discovered amongst a collection rescued from disposal at a New Mexico landfill in 2001. Bouly de Lesdain published 110 scientific papers from the period 1905 to 1961.

Bouly de Lesdain retired in Lille, France, in 1945. That same year he became a corresponding member of the French Academy of Sciences and the French National Museum of Natural History. He died in Lille on 3 January 1965.

== Eponyms ==
The genus Lesdainea (in the Lichens family) was named in his honour in 1910 by French explorer and diplomat François Jules Harmand. It is now a synonym of Trimmatothele Norman ex Zahlbr. Species that have been named after him include; Nesolechia lesdainii Vouaux (1910); Trichodiscula lesdainii Vouaux (1910); Verrucaria lesdainii Harm. (1911); Nectria lesdainii Vouaux (1912); Pleospora lesdainii Vouaux (1912); Mollisia lesdainii Vouaux (1914); Phacopsis lesdainii Vouaux (1914); Rhabdospora lesdainii Vouaux (1914); Lecanora lesdainii Samp. (1916); Crocynia lesdainii Hue (1924); Rinodina lesdainii Samp. (1924); Lecidea lesdainii Zahlbr. (1925); Buellia lesdainii Zahlbr. (1931); Parmelia boulydelesdainii Gyeln. (1931); Parmelia lesdainiana Gyeln. (1934); Usnea lesdainii Motyka (1937); Dendriscocaulon lesdainii Dughi (1945); Staurothele lesdainiana Clauzade & Cl.Roux (1985); and Placidium lesdainii Breuss (2002).

== Selected publications ==
- Bouly de Lesdain, M. (1929). "Lichens du Mexique. Deuxième supplément. Lichens recueillies par le frère Amable St.Pierre". Annales de Cryptogamie Exotique (in French). 2 (3–4): 217–254.
- ————————— (1931). "Lichens recueillis en 1930 dans les îles Kerguelen, Saint Paul et Amsterdam par M. Aubert de la Rue". Annales de Cryptogamie Exotique (in French). 4 (2): 98–103.
- ————————— (1932). "Lichens de l'etat de New-Mexico (USA) recueillis par le frère G. Arsène Brouard". Annales de Cryptogamie Exotique (in French). 5 (1): 89–139.

== See also ==
- Category:Taxa named by Maurice Bouly de Lesdain
