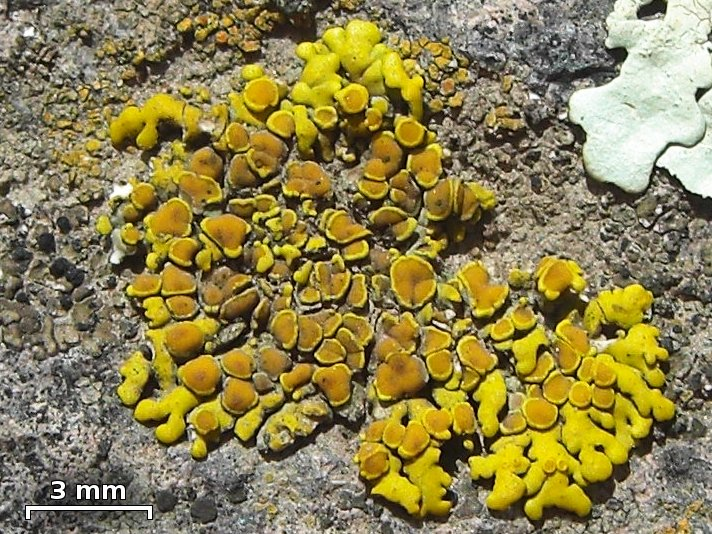
- Placomaronea candelaroides

Scientific classification
- Kingdom: Fungi
- Division: Ascomycota
- Class: Candelariomycetes
- Order: Candelariales
- Family: Candelariaceae
- Genus: Placomaronea; Räsänen (1944)

Type species
- Placomaronea candelarioides Räsänen (1944)

Species
- P. candelarioides P. fruticosa P. fuegiana P. kaernefeltii P. lambii P. mendozae P. minima P. placoidea

= Placomaronea =

Genus of lichen

Placomaronea is a genus of lichen-forming fungi in the family Candelariaceae. These lichens are primarily found in the high mountains of South America, particularly in the Andes, where they grow on rocks and soil in harsh, exposed conditions. Most species form bright yellow, circular patches that can range from flat crusts to more complex, three-dimensional structures. The genus is distinguished from similar yellow lichens by its distinctive cellular structure, which includes specialised pigment-containing caps on the surface cells. Recent studies have added two new species from Peru, bringing the total number of known species to eight.

== Taxonomy ==
The genus was circumscribed by Finnish lichenologist Veli Räsänen in 1944, with Placomaronea candelarioides assigned as the type species. The genus was revised by Martin Westberg and colleagues in 2009, who accepted six species in the genus. Two newly described species from Peru were added to the genus in 2025.

== Description ==
The thalli of Placomaronea species range from crustose to foliose-placodioid and even subfruticose. The cortex is distinctly paraplectenchymatous and the apical cortical cells bear yellow 'pigment hoods' peppered with granules; externally the cortex is coated by a thin, hyaline residue that tends to flake. This cortical architecture sharply contrasts with Candelina, which lacks hoods and instead has a dense, cemented layer of pigment granules on the uppermost cortex, and with most Candelariella, where the cortex is thinner and proso- to indistinctly paraplectenchymatous with a looser pigment layer. The superficially similar Candelariella kansuensis convergently shows a Placomaronea-like hooded cortex, but has an unusually thick, layered hyaline coating.

Across Placomaronea and related genera, secondary metabolite chemistry is largely uniform and of limited taxonomic value: pulvinic acid with 4-hydroxypulvinic acid predominates ('chemotype D'), with variable presence of pulvinic dilactone and calycin in other chemotypes. A K spot test on the thallus surface variably yields no reaction to a weak or strong red reaction; the variability may relate to concentration of 4-hydroxypulvinic acid in the cortex. In Placomaronea most analysed specimens fell in chemotype D (K− to faint K±), with occasional chemotype B (K+).

== Habitat and distribution ==
Placomaronea centres in the central–southern Andes, from Ecuador and Peru south to Chile and Argentina, with outliers for some taxa (e.g. P. mendozae in Arizona, P. minima in Lesotho). The two Peruvian species occur in exposed, high-elevation sites (roughly 3000–4650 m); P. placoidea is saxicolous on sunny rock, whereas P. fruticosa is terricolous in compact puna grassland, with a subterranean, fruticose portion anchoring the thallus.

== Species ==
- Placomaronea candelarioides Räsänen (1944) – South America
- Placomaronea fruticosa Ramos, Hollinger & Bungartz (2025) – Peru
- Placomaronea fuegiana M.Westb. & Frödén (2009) – southeastern South America
- Placomaronea kaernefeltii M.Westb., Frödén & Wedin (2009) – Chile
- Placomaronea lambii (Hakul.) R.Sant. (1974) – Peru; Ecuador
- Placomaronea mendozae (Räsänen) M.Westb. (2004) – Argentina; Peru; Arizona (USA)
- Placomaronea minima M.Westb. & Frödén (2009) – Chile; Argentina; southern Africa
- Placomaronea placoidea Ramos, Hollinger & Bungartz (2025) – Peru
