= Svealand Line =

Railway line in Sweden

The Svealand Line
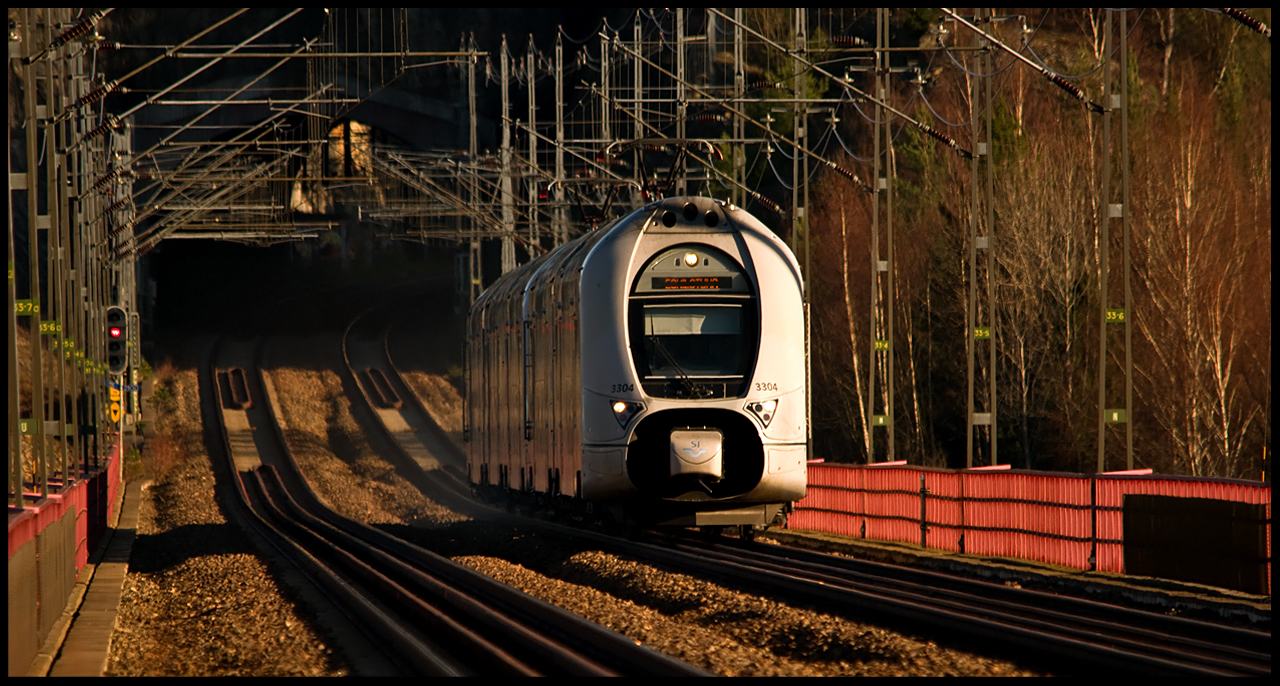
- An X40 regional train at Läggesta.

Overview
- Native name: Svealandsbanan
- Owner: Government of Sweden
- Locale: Stockholm County, Södermanland County and Västmanland County, Sweden
- Termini: Södertälje Syd; Valskog
- Connecting lines: Grödingebanan; Sala–Oxelösund Line; Mälaren Line; Western Main Line

Service
- System: Mälartåg
- Services: Örebro–Eskilstuna–Stockholm–Uppsala
- Operator: Transdev (as of November 2026)
- Rolling stock: ER1 double-decker electric multiple units

History
- Opened: June 1997

Technical
- Line length: 115 km (71 mi)
- Num of tracks: Primarily single-track, with double-track sections between Nykvarn and Läggesta, Strängnäs and Härad, and Eskilstuna and Folkesta.
- Track gauge: 1,435 mm (4 ft 8 1/2 in)
- Electrification: 15 kV, 16.7 Hz AC overhead catenary
- Operating speed: Service: 200 km/h (125 mph); Design: 250 km/h (155 mph)
- Signalling: System H
- Train protection system: Automatic Train Control (ATC)
- Maximum incline: 17.5‰

The Svealand Line (Swedish: Svealandsbanan) is a railway line in Sweden that runs between Södertälje (Södertälje Syd) and Valskog in Kungsör Municipality, via Nykvarn, Läggesta, Strängnäs, Eskilstuna and Kungsör. The station at Läggesta also serves the nearby town of Mariefred. The railway is approximately 115 kilometres (71 mi) long and is primarily used for passenger traffic, although freight trains also operate on the line.

The railway is named after the historical Swedish central region of Svealand. It is owned by the Swedish state, with infrastructure management provided by the Swedish Transport Administration (Trafikverket).

The railway is predominantly single-track, with several passing loops and three sections of double track. The line has a maximum permitted speed of 200 km/h (125 mph), although its infrastructure was designed to accommodate speeds of up to 250 km/h (155 mph).

== History ==
=== Construction and opening ===
The original railway between Södertälje and Eskilstuna, the Norra Södermanlands Railway, opened in 1895. By the beginning of the 1990s, it no longer met modern requirements for passenger comfort, speed and safety. Furthermore, its route did not pass through Strängnäs, the largest town along the railway between its termini.

It was therefore decided to construct an entirely new railway rather than renovate and modernise the existing line. The old Norra Södermanlands Railway ceased operations in January 1994, and construction of the new railway proceeded. The new section, approximately 79 km long, was completed and officially opened in June 1997.

The new Södertälje–Eskilstuna section was constructed with a substantially straighter alignment and gentler curves than the former railway. It was designed for fast regional railway services, with a design standard intended to accommodate speeds of up to 250 km/h (155 mph).

During the three-year construction period, no trains could operate between Eskilstuna and Södertälje. Passengers had to use replacement buses travelling via Strängnäs, Läggesta, Nykvarn and Södertälje, or take a longer route via Västerås. Depending on the service, a change of train in Västerås could also be necessary, as not all trains continued to Stockholm.

The section between Södertälje and Ryssjöbrink was opened for freight traffic in August 1995, ahead of the full opening of the railway.

Two entirely new stations were constructed as part of the project, at Strängnäs and Läggesta. The stations at Eskilstuna and Nykvarn were renovated. At Eskilstuna, the entire railway yard and station area were also rebuilt, with new platforms and a larger pedestrian underpass connecting the city centre with the Nyfors district on the opposite side of the tracks. The station building was also completely renovated.

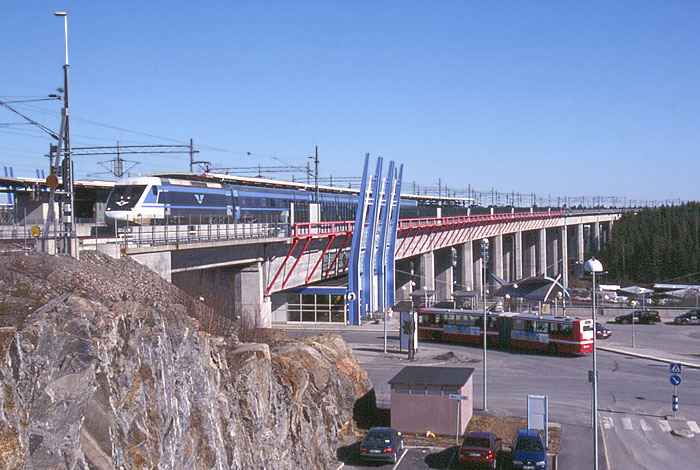
The Svealand Line begins at Södertälje Syd station in Södertälje.

Commemorative plaque for the inauguration in 1997.

Most of the new railway follows an entirely different alignment from the former Norra Södermanlands Railway. One exception is the section between Grundbro and Strängnäs, where the line follows the former railway embankment from Åkers Styckebruk. Several tunnels were constructed, including the Strängnäs Tunnel.

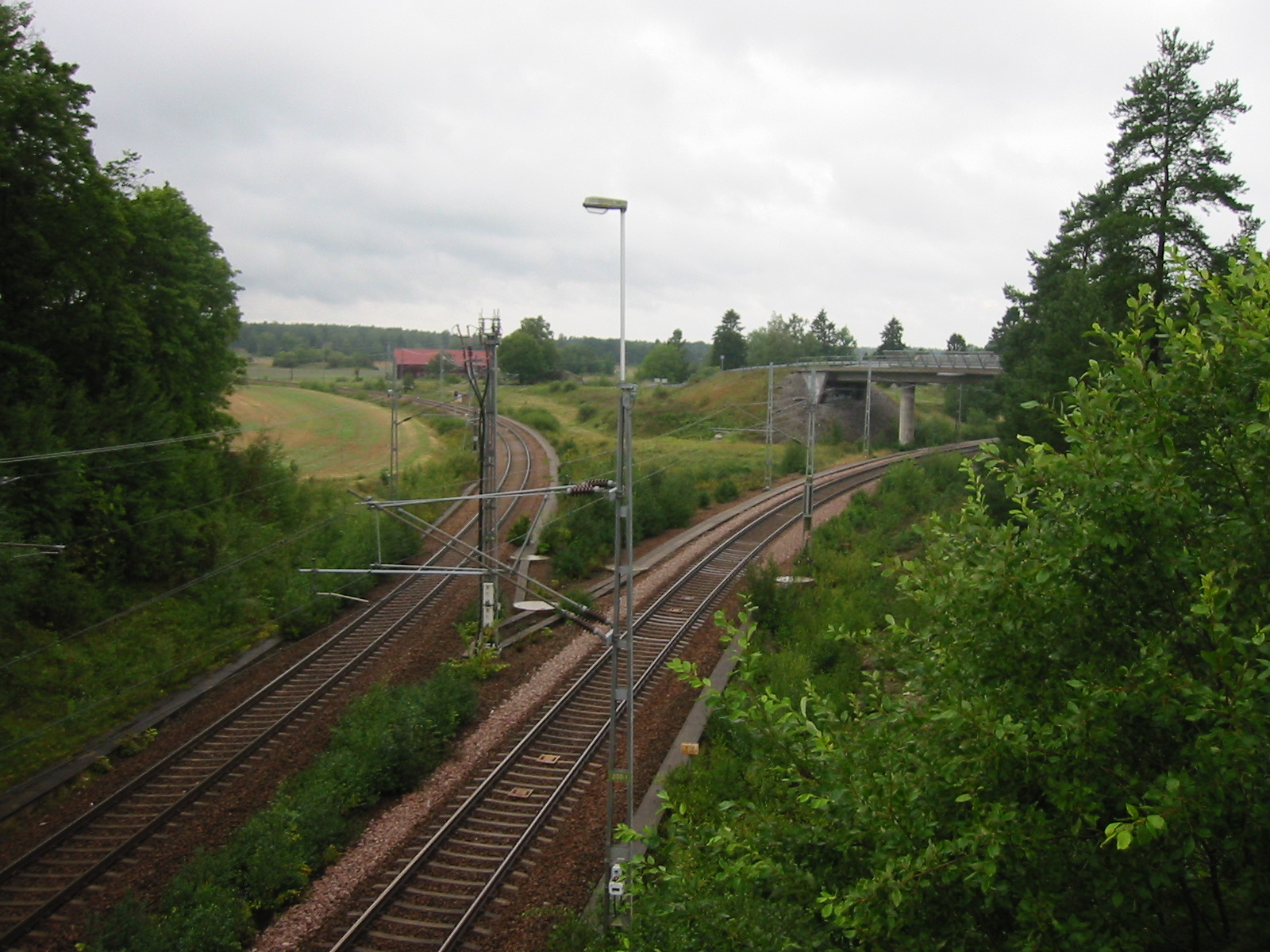
At Tumbo, the Svealand Line (left) connects with the railway from Kolbäck.

Between Eskilstuna and Rekarne, the Svealand Line shares its alignment with the Sala–Oxelösund line. The final section, between Rekarne and Valskog, originally opened in 1877 and was constructed by the Oxelösund–Flen–Västmanlands Railway. It retains its original alignment, although some improvements have been made over the years. The section was electrified in 1954 and, when incorporated into the Svealand Line, was upgraded to double track between Eskilstuna and Folkesta.

=== Rolling stock and early operation ===
The original intention was for the Svealand Line to be operated by specially purchased trains. However, no such trains were available when the railway opened in June 1997.

Instead, the first services were operated using X2-2/X2-1 (X2000) trains. These were subsequently replaced by locomotive-hauled trains, which in turn were replaced by Regina trains of the X52 type, capable of operating at up to 200 km/h (125 mph).

The Regina trains were later almost entirely replaced by the double-decker X40 trains, which entered regular service on the line in 2005 and became the dominant train type from 2006.

From 2019–2020, the double-decker ER1 electric multiple units were introduced. They subsequently replaced the X40 trains on passenger services. The ER1 trains are operated under the Mälartåg brand.

The railway was constructed with platforms 250 metres long, except at Eskilstuna, where they are 350 metres long. At Arboga, the effective platform length for trains arriving from the east and terminating there is only 170 metres.

=== Capacity improvements ===
Passenger numbers increased substantially following the opening of the new railway. By 2001, regional train journeys between Eskilstuna and Stockholm had increased to approximately 1.6 million journeys across the county boundary, around seven times the number recorded on the old railway service in 1993.

The predominantly single-track railway proved sensitive to service disruptions and capacity constraints. As part of the Stockholm–Mälardalen capacity improvement programme (Kraftsamling Stockholm-Mälardalen), the then Swedish Rail Administration (Banverket) constructed additional passing stations at Barva, Grundbro and Almnäs.

The double-track section between Ryssjöbrink and Läggesta was extended towards Nykvarn, creating a continuous double-track section between Nykvarn and Läggesta. The extension was completed in 2010. The full section is approximately 18 km long, and most scheduled train crossings on the line take place there.

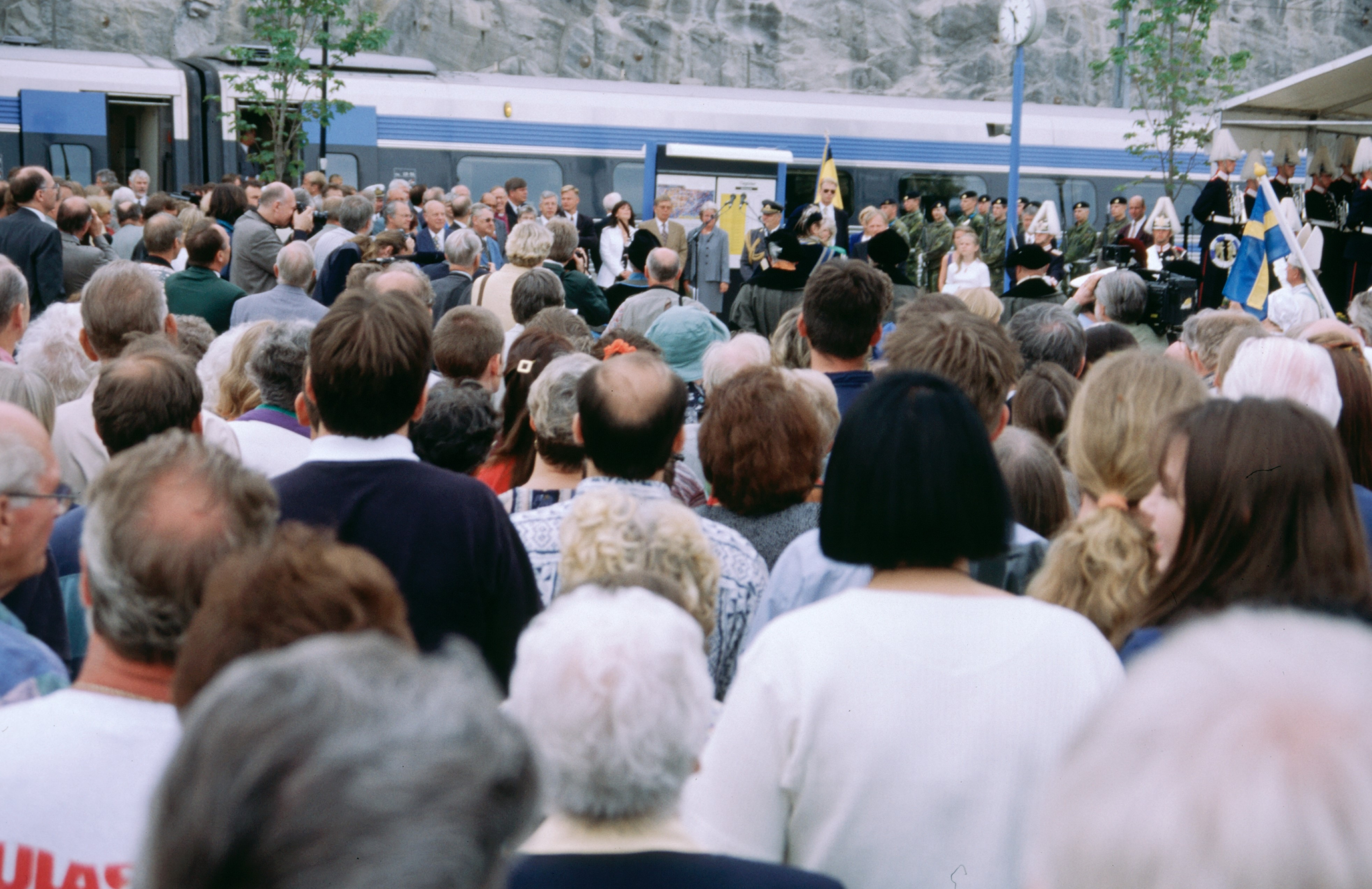
The inauguration of Strängnäs station during the opening of the Svealand Line on 9 June 1997.

The approximately 7 km section between Strängnäs and Härad was upgraded to double track between September 2014 and June 2018.

The project, together with the construction of the Stockholm City Line (Swedish: Citybanan) in Stockholm, made it possible to operate additional trains between Eskilstuna and Stockholm.

The former single-track arrangement at Strängnäs station had long been a capacity problem. Almost all trains stopped at the station, making it difficult for trains travelling in opposite directions to pass there. Consequently, train crossings often had to be scheduled at other locations along the line, sometimes requiring trains to wait or pass away from the station.

The current arrangement has three double-track sections:

- Nykvarn–Läggesta, approximately 18 km, including Ryssjöbrink.
- Strängnäs–Härad, approximately 7 km.
- Eskilstuna–Folkesta, approximately 6 km, including the intermodal freight terminal at Folkesta in Eskilstuna Municipality.

A map of the railway's operational area published by the Swedish Transport Administration in 2018 shows the relevant track infrastructure and the freight terminal.

== Technical characteristics ==
The Svealand Line uses standard gauge track (1,435 mm) and is electrified using a 15 kV, 16.7 Hz AC overhead catenary system.

The maximum permitted speed is 200 km/h (125 mph). The newly constructed infrastructure was designed to accommodate speeds of up to 250 km/h (155 mph), with its alignment and overhead electrification infrastructure built to that standard. However, the signalling system is not currently equipped to support operation at 250 km/h (155 mph). In Sweden, operation at that speed requires the European Rail Traffic Management System (ERTMS).

The maximum axle load is 22.5 tonnes (STAX D2), and the maximum gradient is 17.5‰.

The line uses the Swedish System H signalling system and is equipped with Automatic Train Control (ATC).

Most of the railway is single-track. Trains pass each other at designated passing loops and stations, while the three double-track sections allow trains to travel in both directions simultaneously. The longer section between Nykvarn and Läggesta is particularly important for scheduled train crossings without either train having to stop.

== Traffic ==
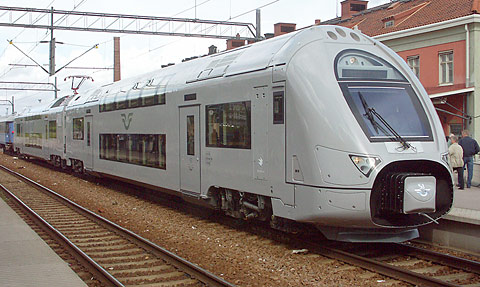
An X40 train at Eskilstuna Central Station.

=== Passenger services ===
As of 2026, the line is served by Mälartåg regional passenger services on the Örebro–Eskilstuna–Stockholm–Uppsala route. Depending on the departure, trains may terminate at Arboga or continue towards Örebro. Services also connect the line with Arlanda Airport and Uppsala via Stockholm.

The services are marketed under the Mälartåg brand. As of November 2026, Transdev operates the trains on behalf of Mälardalstrafik. VR Sverige is scheduled to take over the operation of Mälartåg's regional services in December 2026.

Passenger services generally operate hourly on weekdays between Eskilstuna and Stockholm, with additional departures during peak periods. Some peak-hour services operate at approximately 30-minute intervals on the busiest sections. Between Eskilstuna and Arboga, services generally operate hourly on weekdays and approximately every two hours on weekends.

An earlier timetable for the Örebro–Eskilstuna–Stockholm section was published by Mälartåg as timetable table 58 in 2020.

All regular passenger services on the line use ER1 double-decker electric multiple units.

=== Freight services ===
In addition to passenger traffic, the Svealand Line is used by freight trains. Freight traffic is relatively limited compared with passenger services.

Facilities along the route include a terminal in Nykvarn for the transshipment of biofuel and a railway connection serving Volkswagen's central warehouse. Through freight services include container trains between Södertälje Harbour and Västerås. Freight traffic is more common west of Eskilstuna, particularly on the section shared with the Sala–Oxelösund line.
