= Strängnäs railway station =

Railway station in Strängnäs, Sweden

Strängnäs Strängnäs resecentrum
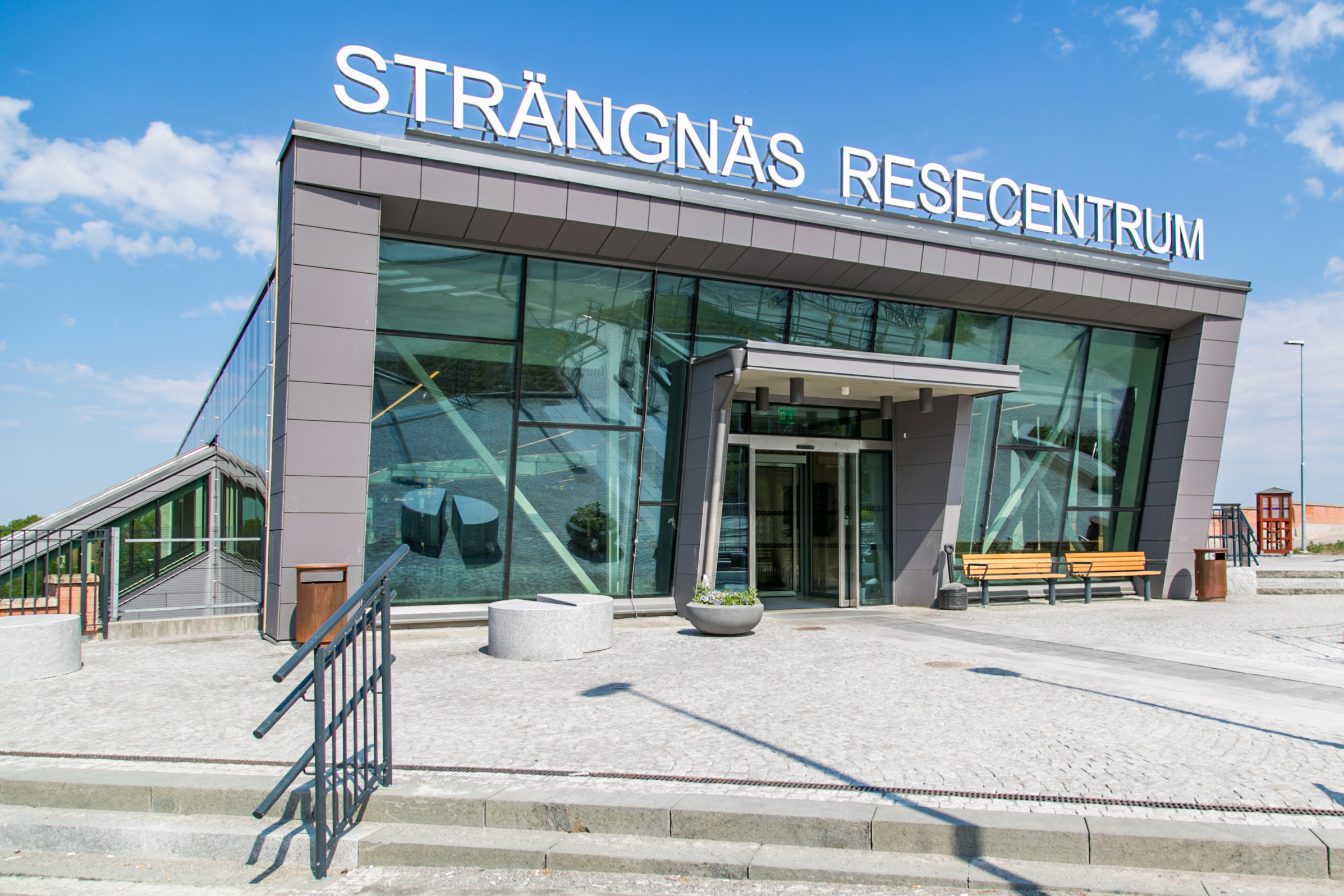
- Southern entrance of Strängnäs Travel Centre in 2018.

General information
- Location: Södertäljevägen; Strängnäs; Sweden
- Coordinates: 59.3709°N 17.0258°E
- Owner: Strängnäs Municipality
- Line: Svealand Line
- Distance: 47 km from Södertälje syd railway station
- Platforms: 2
- Tracks: 2
- Train operators: Mälartåg

Other information
- Station code: SGS

History
- Opened: 1997; 29 years ago

Services
Preceding station	Regional trains	Following station
Läggesta towards Stockholm Central	Mälartåg	Eskilstuna Central towards Arboga
Location

Strängnäs station (Swedish: Strängnäs station), also known as Strängnäs Travel Centre (Swedish: Strängnäs resecentrum), is a railway station in Strängnäs, Sweden. Located on the Svealand Line, it serves as the town's principal public transport hub and is served by regional trains operated by Mälartåg. The station is situated approximately 47 kilometres west of Södertälje syd railway station.

== History ==
=== Original station 1895-1997 ===
The original railway station in Strängnäs developed during the late 19th century as part of the expansion of regional rail infrastructure in Södermanland. In 1881, the bishop of Strängnäs proposed the construction of a railway between Södertälje and Strängnäs, reflecting the town’s administrative importance at the time. The line was inaugurated in 1895 by King Oscar II, together with branch connections from Läggesta to Mariefred and from Åkers styckebruk to Strängnäs.

The station functioned as a terminus on a branch line linked to the Northern Södermanland Railway system and played an important role in both passenger and freight transport. It provided connections to industrial operations at Åkers styckebruk, one of Sweden’s oldest industrial sites, and supported regional travel towards Stockholm and Eskilstuna. The railway expansion also coincided with early communications development, including the establishment of telephone lines in 1885.

During the early 20th century, rail services in the region were gradually reduced and restructured. In 1907, mainline traffic to Mariefred ceased, and over time other parts of the branch network were scaled back as transport patterns shifted.

=== Current station 1997- ===
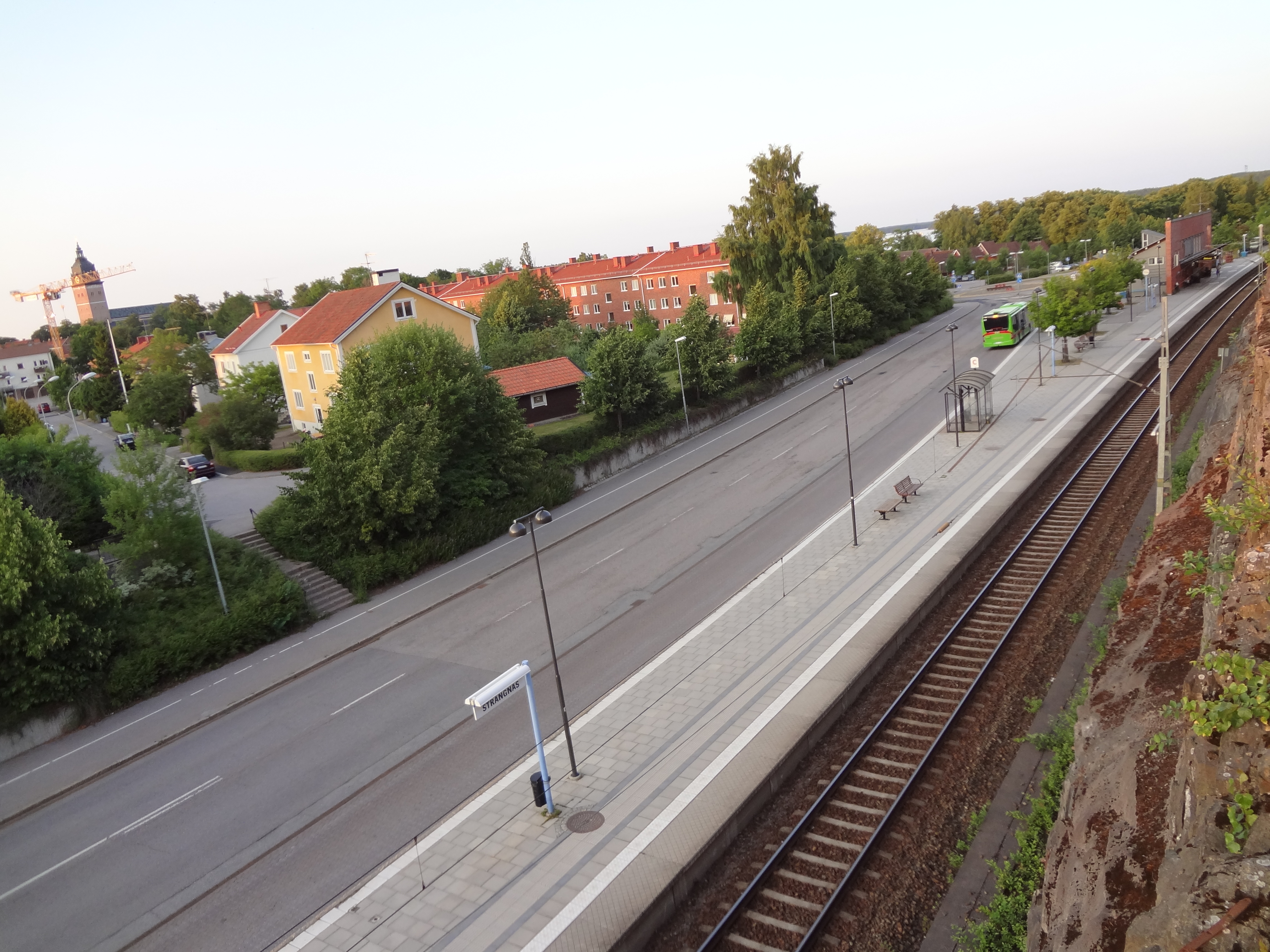
Strängnäs station in 2013, before the reconstruction.The former station building can be seen at the top right of the picture.

Following the construction of the Svealand Line, a new through station was built on a different alignment west of the town centre. The new station opened in 1997 together with the railway, providing direct rail connections between Strängnäs, Stockholm, Eskilstuna, and other destinations without the need for transfers.

The station was originally built with a single track, limiting operational flexibility and preventing trains from passing each other at Strängnäs. To accommodate increasing rail traffic on the Svealand Line, a reconstruction programme was undertaken between 2014 and 2018. The project included the addition of a second track, the construction of a new rail tunnel approach, upgraded platforms, and a new station building. Double-track operations commenced on 30 June 2018.

== Station facilities ==
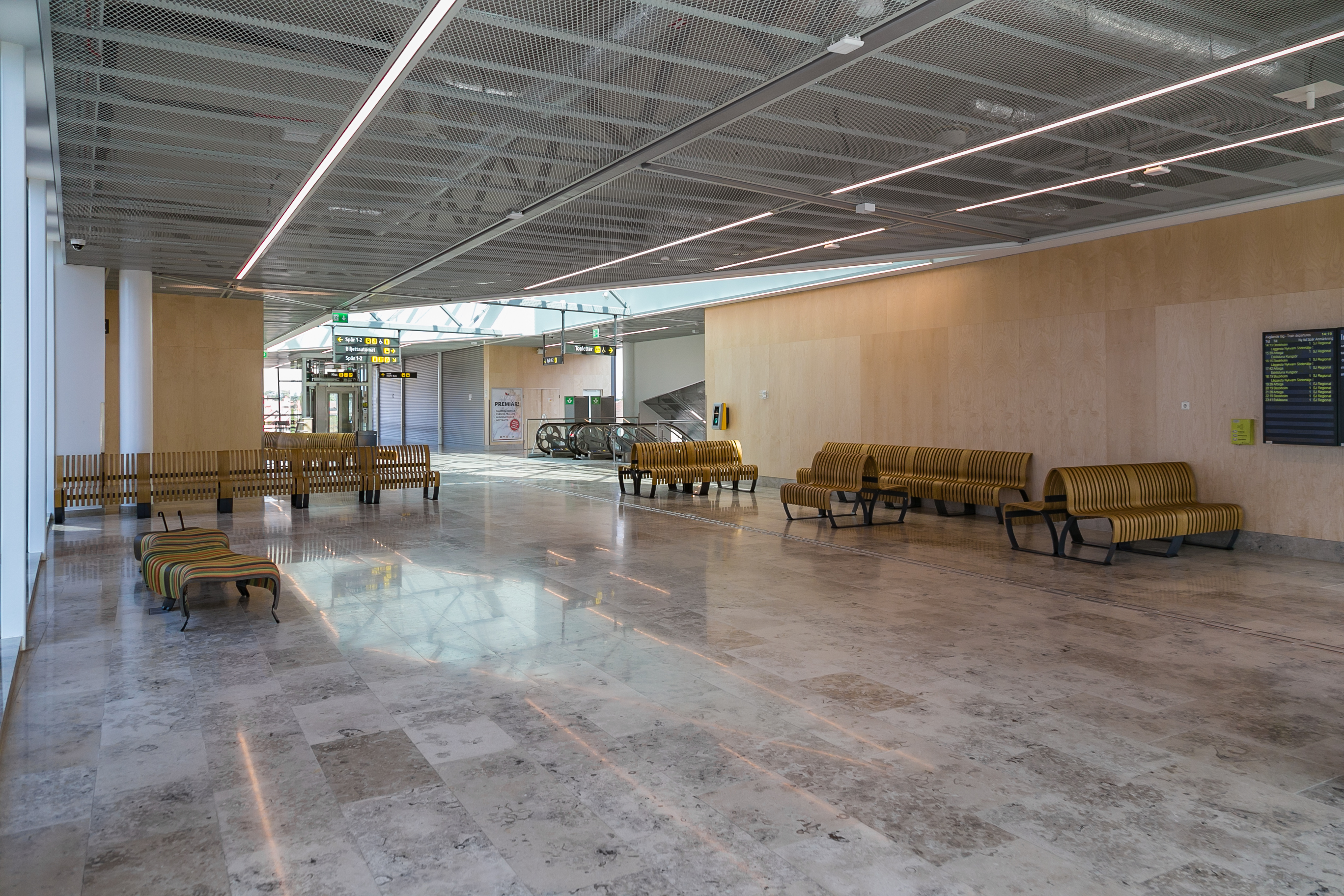
Waiting room, 2018

The current station building opened in December 2017 and replaced an earlier station structure that was demolished during the redevelopment project. The building is located above the railway tracks and contains a waiting hall, ticket machines, retail facilities, lifts, escalators, and accessible passenger amenities.

The station has entrances on both the northern and southern sides of the railway. Bus stops serving local and regional routes are located adjacent to the northern entrance. Facilities for cyclists, short-term parking, taxi services, and a multi-storey parking garage are also provided.

== Strängnäs Tunnel ==
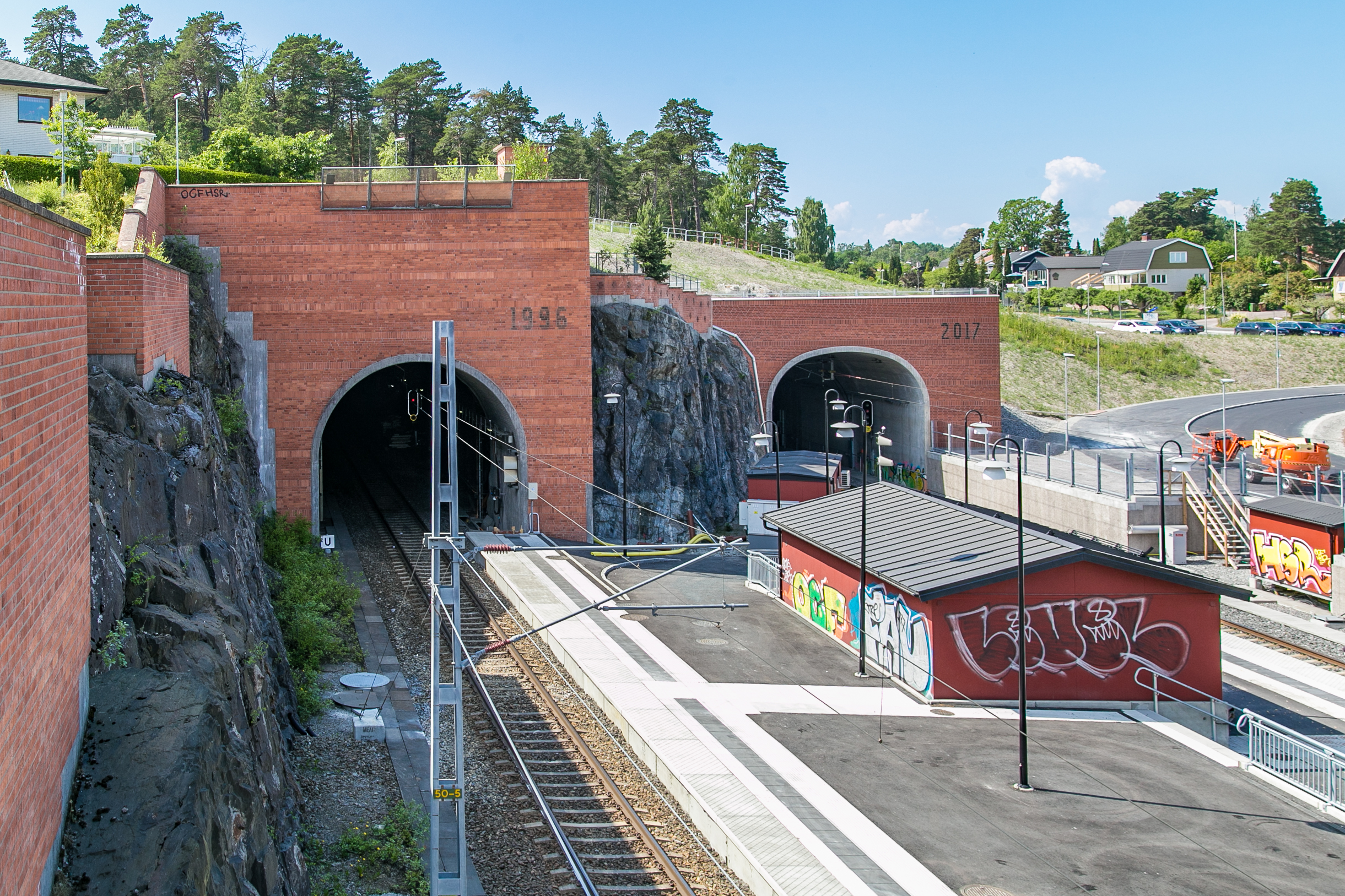
Strängnäs Tunnel

Immediately west of the station lies the Strängnäs Tunnel (Swedish: Strängnästunneln), a 2-kilometre long railway tunnel opened in 1997 as part of the Svealand Line project. At the time of its inauguration it was Sweden's second-longest railway tunnel, after the Gårda Tunnel in Gothenburg. The tunnel remains one of the longest railway tunnels in the country and forms a key part of the line through central Södermanland.

== Services ==
Strängnäs station is served by regional passenger services operated by Mälartåg. Regular services provide connections to Stockholm, Eskilstuna, Örebro, Linköping, Uppsala, and other destinations in the Mälaren Valley region.

In addition to rail services, the station functions as an interchange for local and regional bus routes, making it the primary public transport hub in Strängnäs Municipality.

== See also ==
- List of railway stations in Sweden
- Svealand Line
