= Eskilstuna Central Station =

Railway station in Eskilstuna, Sweden

Eskilstuna C
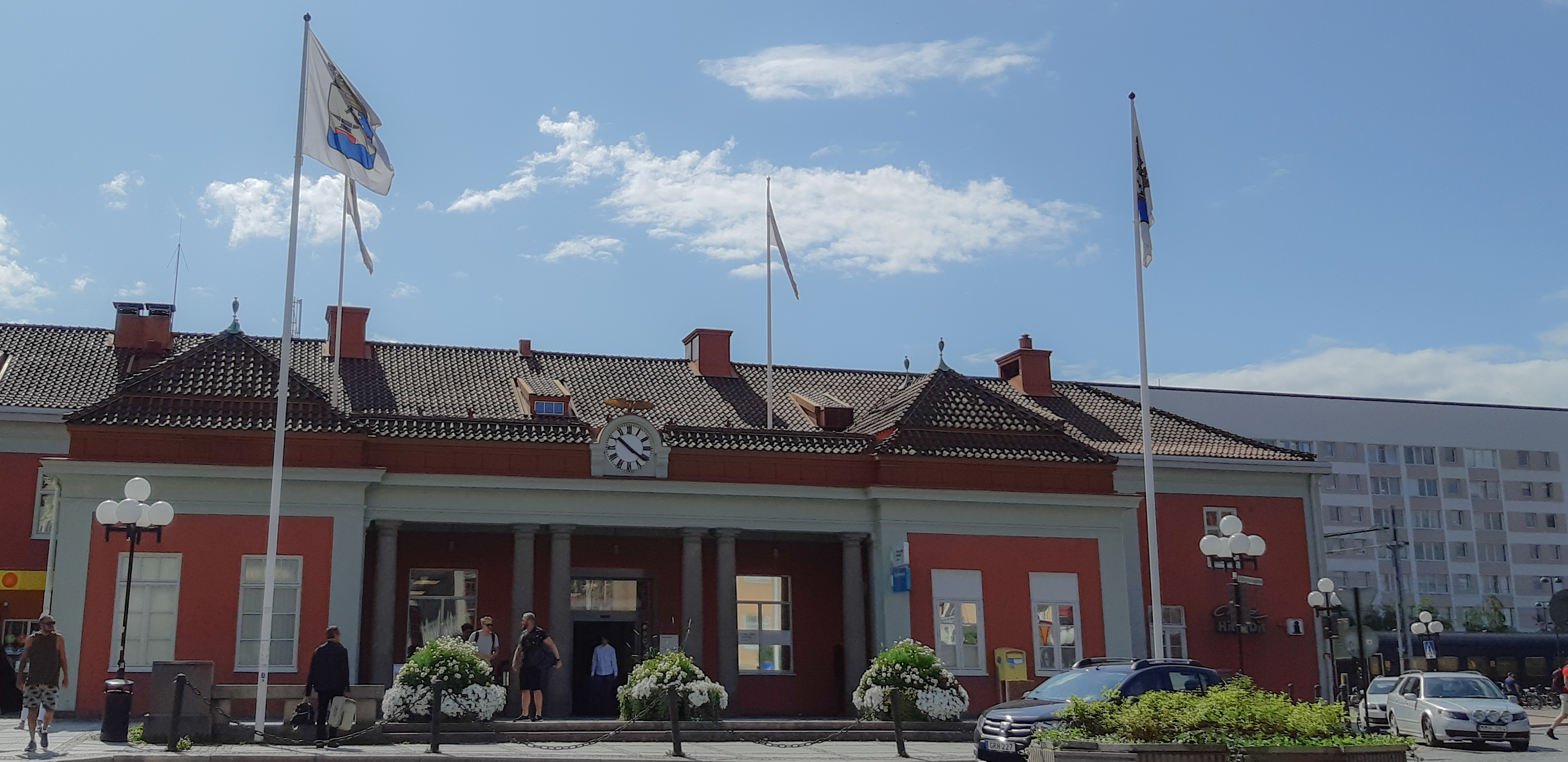

General information
- Location: Eskilstuna Centralstation; 632 20 Eskilstuna; Sweden
- Coordinates: 59°22′24″N 16°30′26″E
- Owner: Jernhusen (station infrastructure); Trafikverket (rail infrastructure)
- Line: Södertälje-Valskog
- Platforms: 3
- Tracks: 4
- Train operators: Mälartåg

History
- Opened: 1877; 149 years ago

Services
| Preceding station | Regional trains | Following station |
|---|---|---|
| Hälleforsnäs towards Linköping C | Mälartåg | Kvicksund towards Uppsala C |
| Kungsör towards Örebro C | Mälartåg | Strängnäs towards Uppsala C |
Location

Eskilstuna Central Station (Swedish: Eskilstuna centralstation) also known as Eskilstuna C is a railway station in Eskilstuna, Sweden. It serves as the primary transport hub for the city and is part of the national rail network.

== History ==
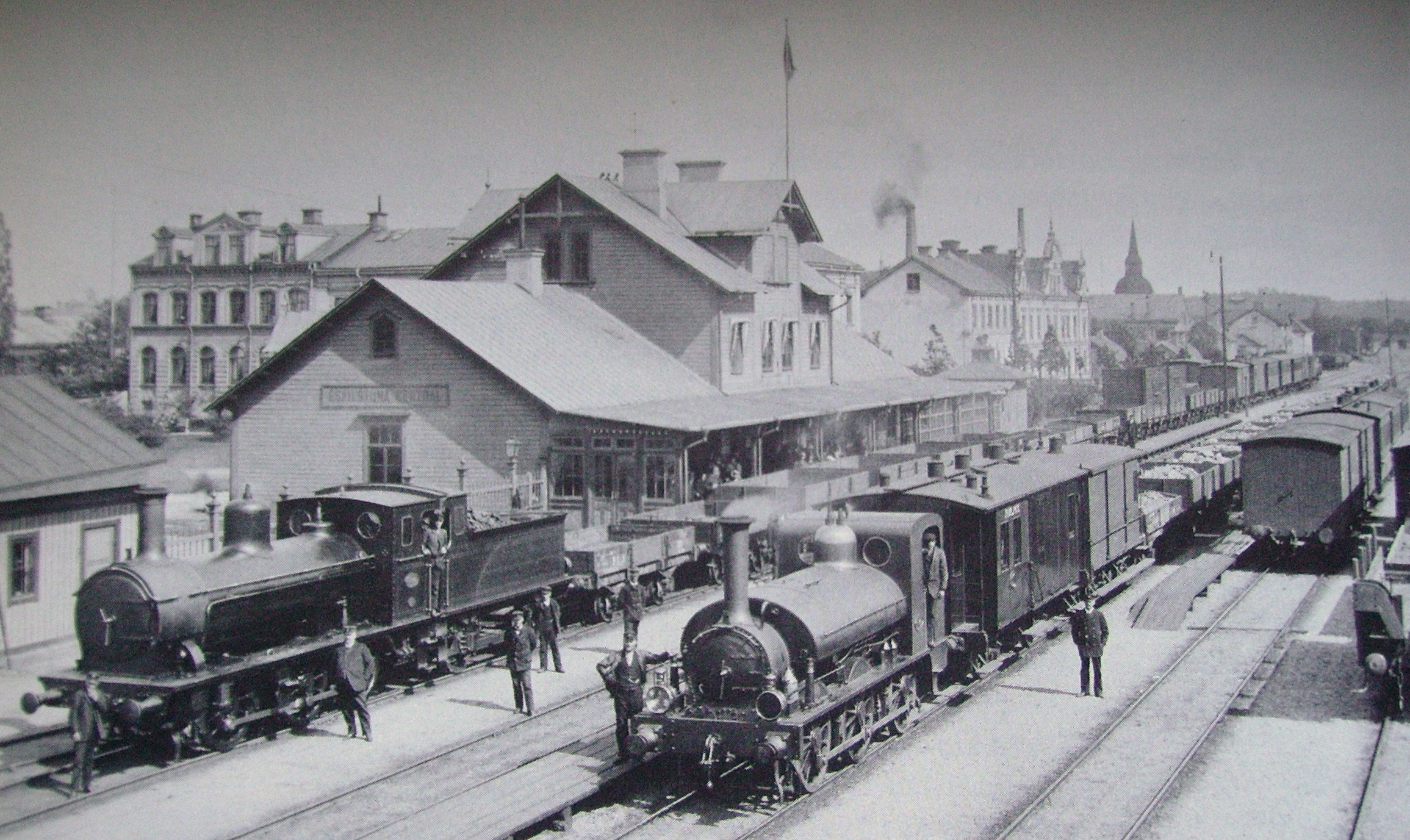
Eskilstuna C around 1900

Eskilstuna Railway Station was inaugurated in 1877, coinciding with the opening of the Oxelösund–Flen–Eskilstuna Railway, which connected the city to Valskog and Kolbäck in Västmanland.

The original station building was completed in 1876. In 1895, the opening of the Norra Sörmland Railway led to the renaming of OFWJ's station to Eskilstuna Central Station. The station underwent significant renovations in 1924, giving it its present appearance. The architectural design was done by Adolf W. Edelsvärd, who was responsible for many Swedish railway stations.

During the 20th century, Eskilstuna Central Station played a role in the industrial development of the city, facilitating the transport of goods and workers. In recent years, efforts have been made to modernise the station while preserving its historical significance.

== Services ==
Eskilstuna Central Station is a key stop on the Svealandsbanan railway line, which runs between Södertälje and Valskog via Mariefred Läggesta, Strängnäs, and Eskilstuna. The line is mainly single-tracked, with sections of double track, and allows trains to operate at speeds up to 200 km/h.

Passenger services at Eskilstuna Central are primarily operated by Mälartåg, with connections to cities such as Stockholm, Uppsala, Örebro, Sala, and Linköping.

In addition to rail services, Eskilstuna Central offers bus and taxi connections.

== Future Developments ==
Plans are in place to update the station to a transport hub (Swedish: Resecentrum). The redevelopment aims to improve passenger facilities, increase commercial space, and improve connectivity between different modes of transport. The upgrades will accommodate the growing number of travellers. One of the major planned improvements includes platform extensions to support longer trains.

== See also ==
- List of railway stations in Sweden
