= Listed buildings in Västmanland County =

There are 42 listed buildings (Swedish: byggnadsminne) in Västmanland County.

== Multiple municipalities ==
| Image | Name | Premise | Number of buildings | Year built | Architect | Coordinates | ID |
|---|---|---|---|---|---|---|---|
| | Strömsholms kanal | Semla 11:14 etc. Finntorpet 1:3 etc. Virsbo 2:316 etc. Horn 6:2 etc. | 85 | 1777–1795 | | 59.68684°N 16.15961°E | 21300000015243 |

== Arboga Municipality ==
| Image | Name | Premise | Number of buildings | Year built | Architect | Coordinates | ID |
|---|---|---|---|---|---|---|---|
| | Kungsgården 3, 5 | Kungsgården 3, 5 | 11 | | | 59.39342°N 15.83998°E | 21300000001968 |
| | Crugska gården | Fältskären 2, 3 | 5 | | | 59.39294°N 15.84273°E | 21300000001939 |
| | Götlunda previously kyrkoherdebostad | Holmsätter 1:77 | 1 | 17th century | | 59.35485°N 15.66768°E | 21300000013026 |

== Fagersta Municipality ==
placeholder

== Hallstahammar Municipality ==
placeholder

== Kungsör Municipality ==
There are no listed buildings in Kungsör Municipality.

== Köping Municipality ==
placeholder

== Norberg Municipality ==
placeholder

== Sala Municipality ==
placeholder

== Skinnskatteberg Municipality ==
placeholder

== Surahammar Municipality ==
There are no listed buildings in Surahammar Municipality.

== Västerås Municipality ==
placeholder
