= Östra Södermanlands Järnväg =

Narrow gauge heritage railway

Östra Södermanlands Järnväg (Ö.Sl.J.), Eastern Södermanland Railway is a 600 mm (1 ft 11 5/8 in) narrow gauge railway in Mariefred, Sweden. Steam-hauled passenger traffic is provided all days of the week during the summer.

Operations began on a small scale at the Lina brick works in Södertälje in 1959, until a chance to take over the recently closed Läggesta–Mariefred line appeared in 1964.

== General remarks ==
Ö.Sl.J. operates traffic with 600 mm (1 ft 11 5/8 in) narrow gauge locomotives and carriages dating from 1890–1925. Scheduled traffic runs between Mariefred, Läggesta and Taxinge-Näsby, a total length of 11 km (6.8 mi).

The collection of rolling stock of this heritage railway is centered on the seven Swedish railways which ran scheduled passenger traffic on 600 mm (1 ft 11 5/8 in) narrow gauge track. The collection of passenger cars is internationally noteworthy, as 600 mm (1 ft 11 5/8 in) narrow gauge is typically used for industrial freight only.

== Mariefred–Läggesta ==
This part of the line is the heart of Ö.Sl.J. The line was originally the SJ standard gauge spur line from Läggesta to Mariefred, which the Swedish State Railways (SJ) operated until 1964 when the line was closed. Ö.Sl.J. took over the track and station in Mariefred after a few years and relaid the track to 600 mm (1 ft 11 5/8 in) narrow gauge.

== Läggesta – Taxinge-Näsby ==
When the new SJ main line "Svealandsbanan" (Södertälje–Eskilstuna) was built in 1995, the old Södertälje–Eskilstuna line was closed and the track torn up on most of the line. Soon after this Ö.Sl.J. got permission to use the 7 km (4.3 mi)-long remaining part of the line from Läggesta to Taxinge-Näsby. After a 10-year-long trial period running a type Y7 railcar the line was regauged to 600 mm (1 ft 11 5/8 in) narrow gauge. Traffic with trains on 600 mm (1 ft 11 5/8 in) tracks started in May 2011.

== The collection ==
Steam locomotives at Östra Södermanlands Järnväg:

Nr.1 Lotta (under restoration)

No 2 Lessebo (the only remaining original design Mallet locomotive in the world. Not operational)

Nr.2 Virå (operational)

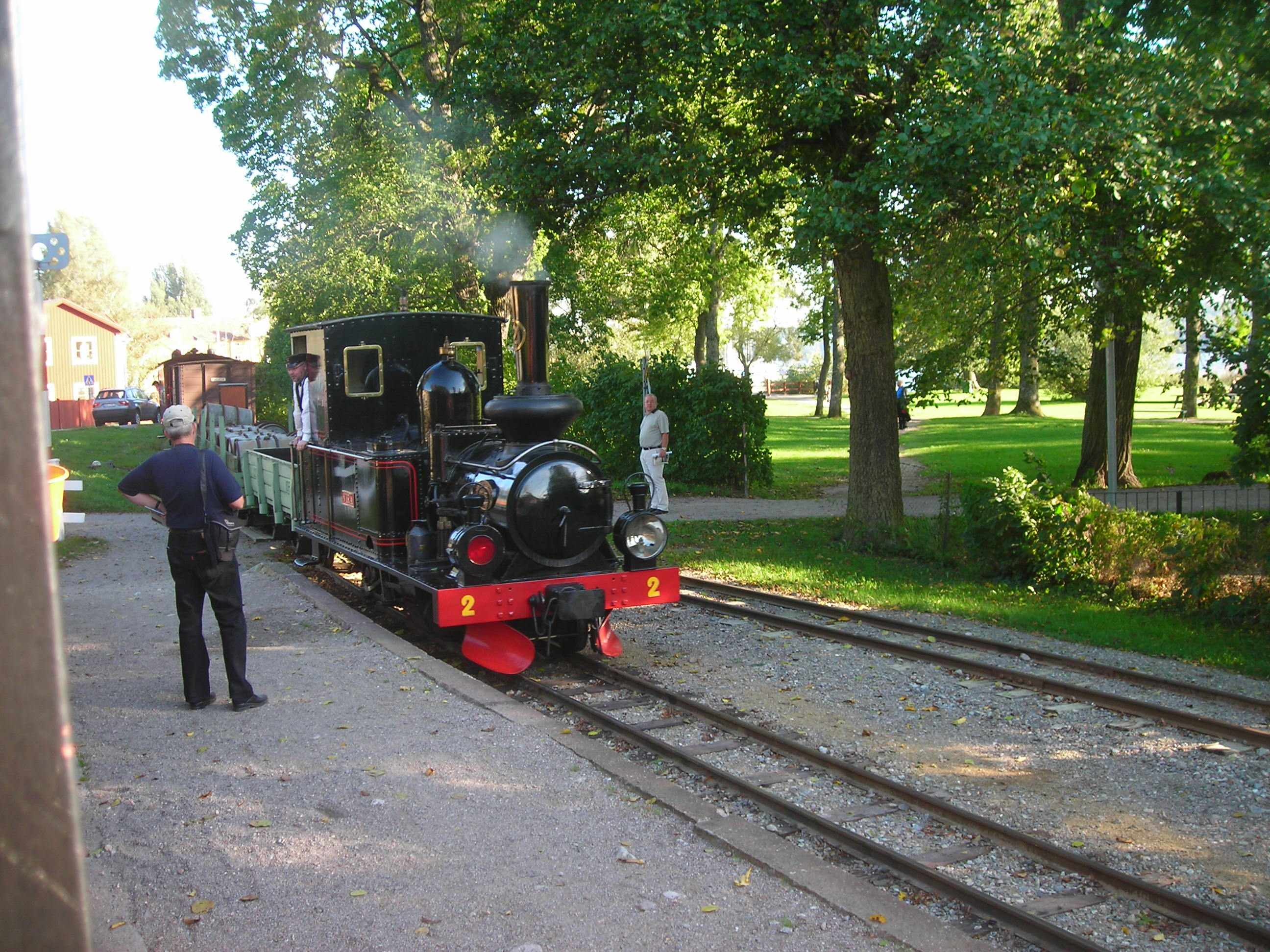
Virå

Nr.3 Dylta (not operational)

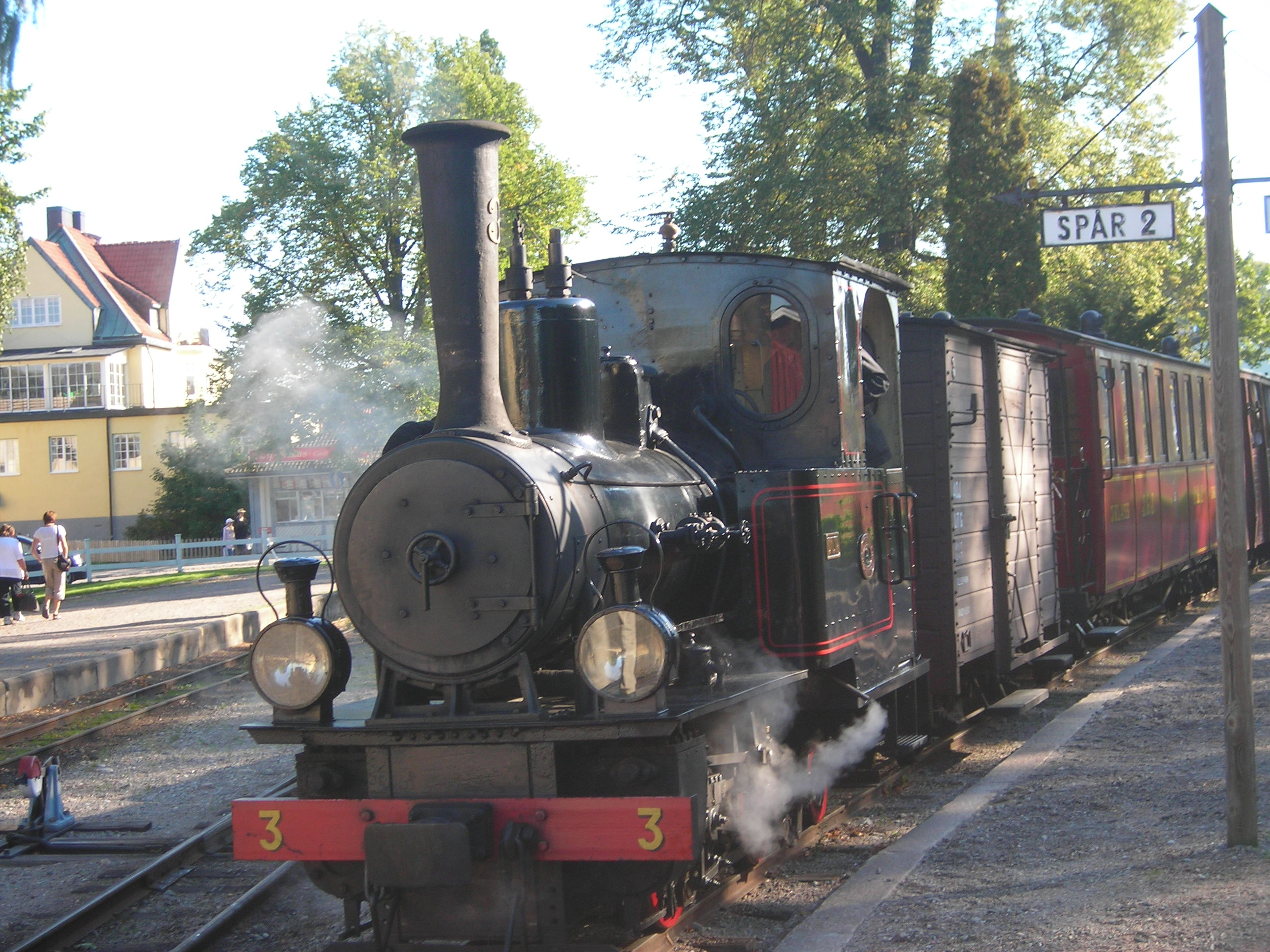
Dylta

Nr.4 km Nelsson (not operational)

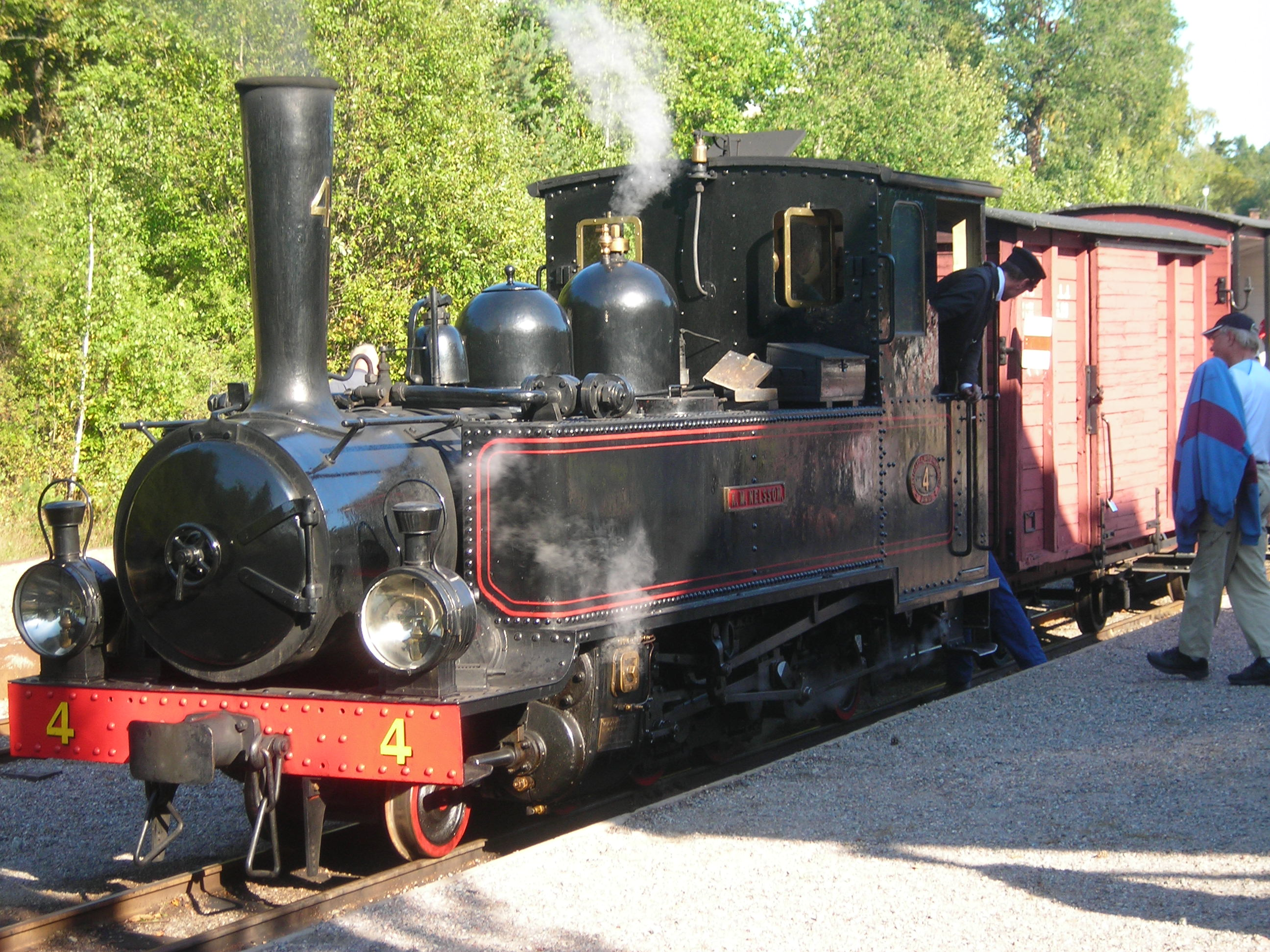
KM Nelsson

Nr.5 Hamra (machinery overhaul)

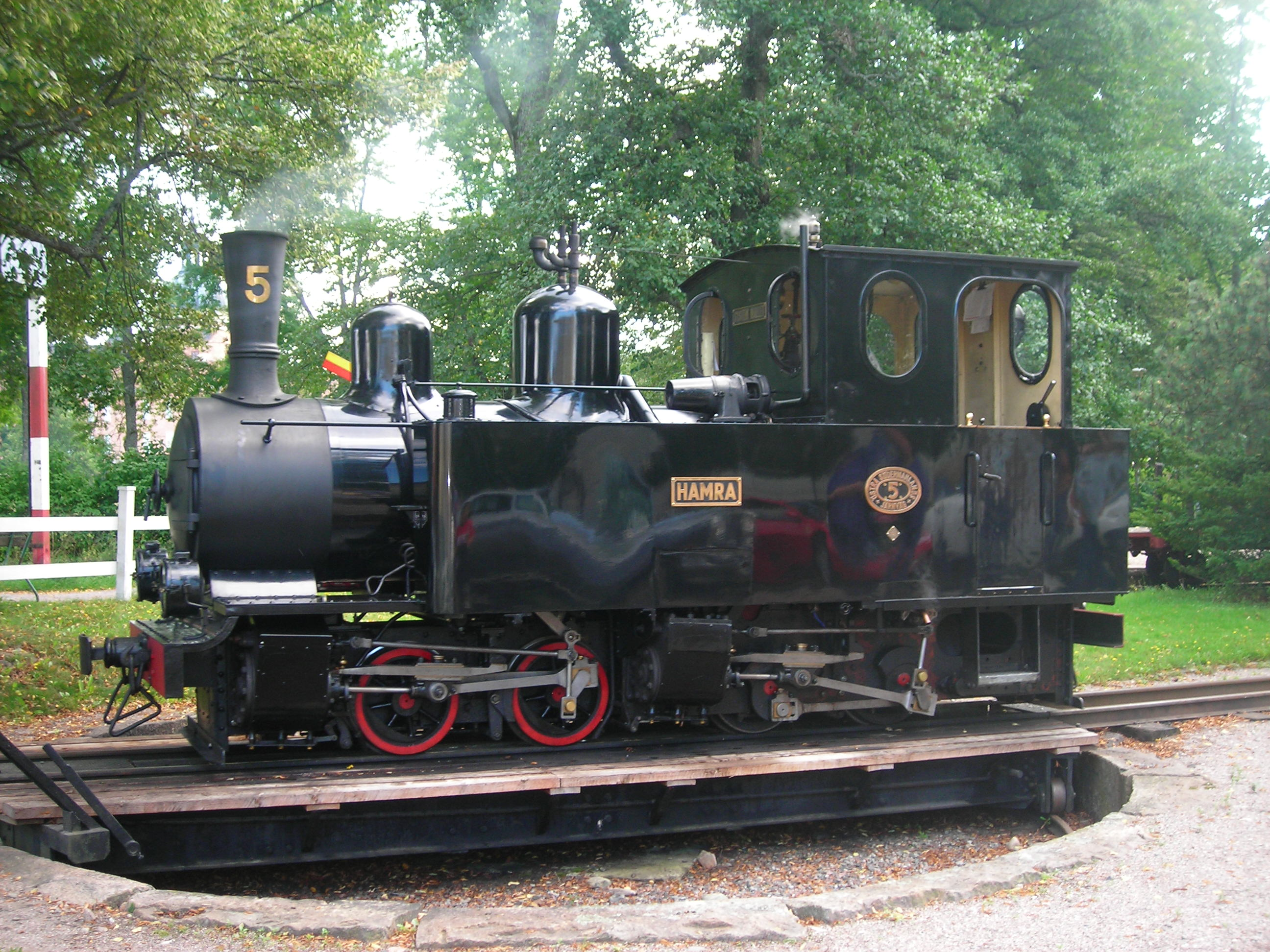
Hamra

Nr.6 Christina Hjelm (under reconstruction)

Nr.7 Helgenäs (boiler overhaul)

Nr.8 Emsfors (operational)

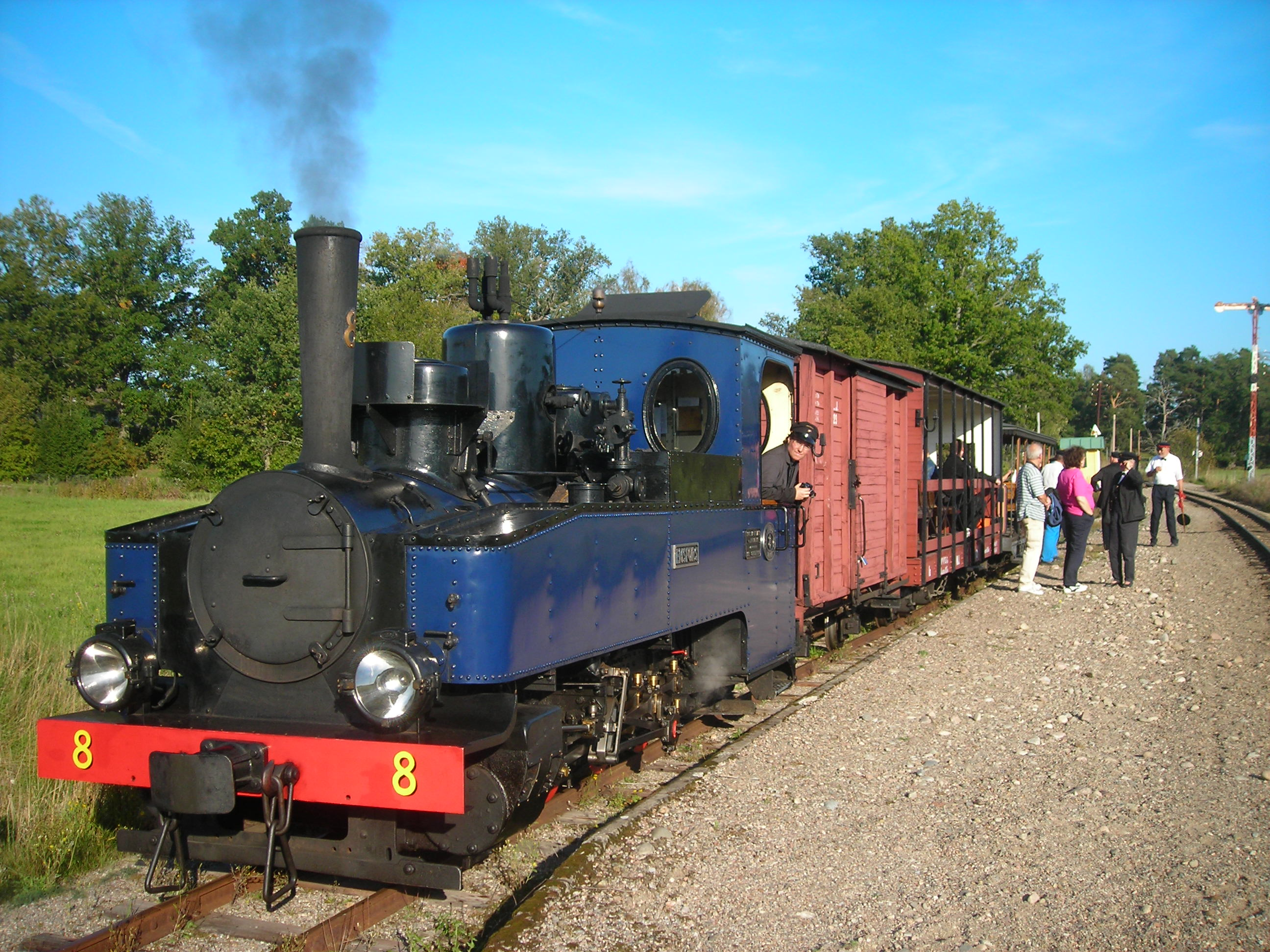
Emsfors

Nr.9 JGJ 9 (operational)

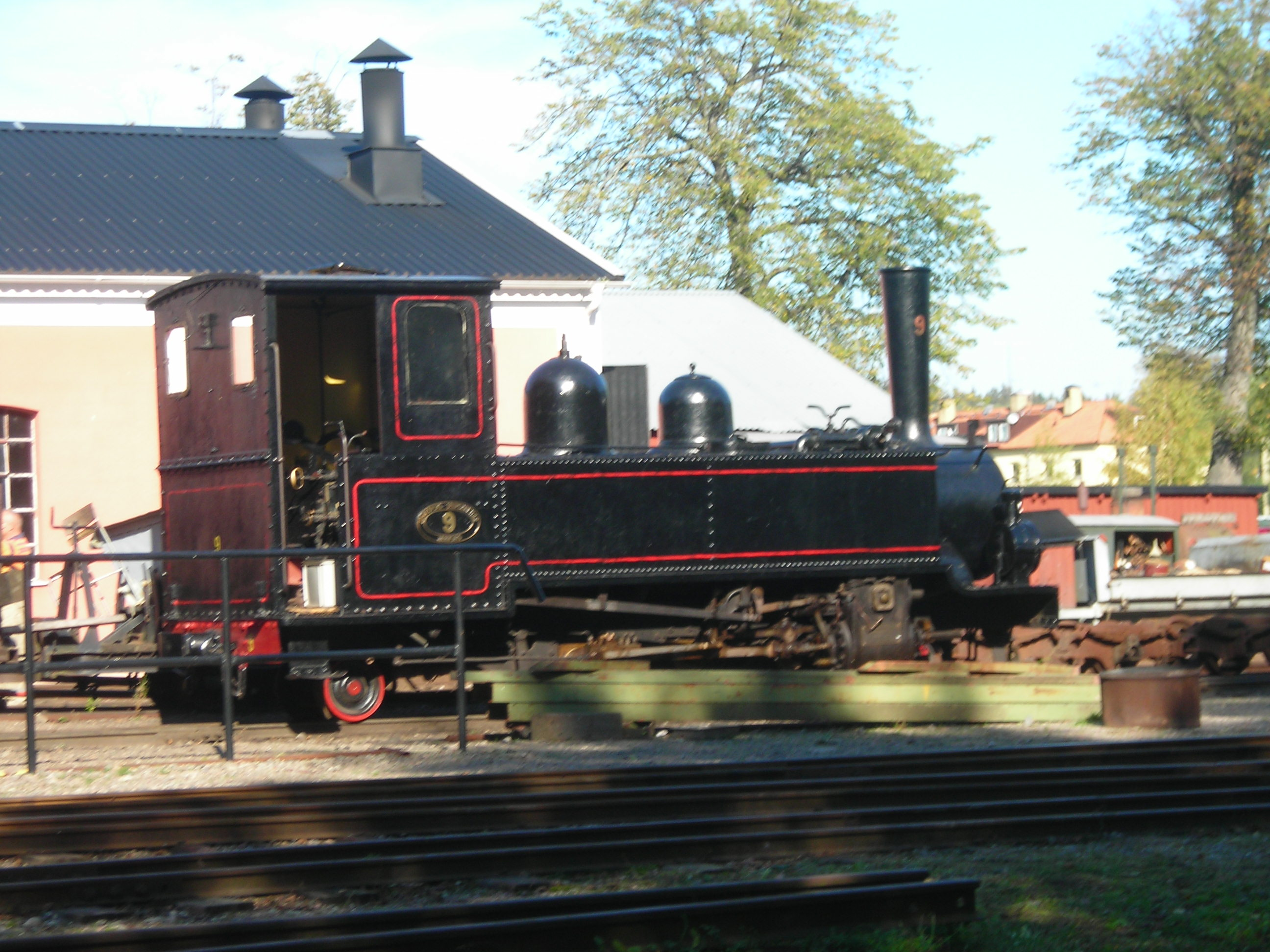
JGJ 9

Nr.10 Avesta (operational)

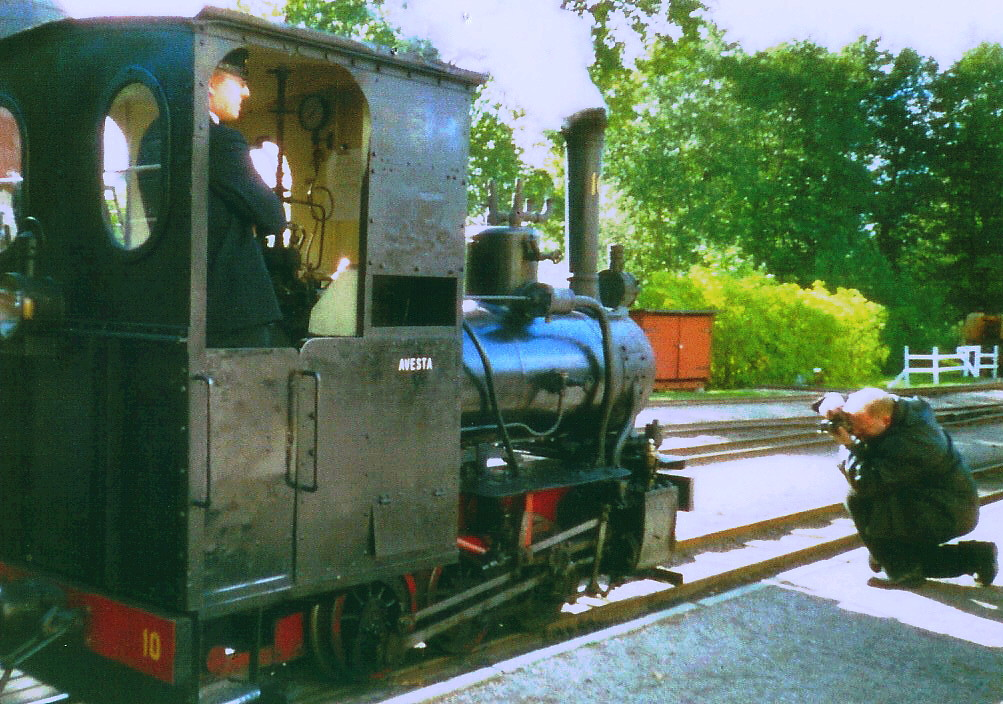
Avesta

== See also ==
- List of heritage railways
