= Lars Kinström =

Swedish organist and instrument maker

- Born: 14 August 1710; Risinge, Sweden
- Died: December 6, 1763 (aged 53); Hedvig Eleonora parish, Sweden
- Instrument: Organ
- Spouse: Christina Kinström

Lars Kinström, born 14 August 1710 in Risinge, Östergötland, died 6 December 1763 in Hedvig Eleonora Parish in Stockholm, was a Swedish organist and instrument maker. His nephew Matthias Lundbom was a piano maker and organist in Stockholm. His widow Christina Kinström continued the business after his death.

== Life ==
Kinström was born 1710 in Risinge parish in Östergötland and was the son of the commander of Finspång Castle, Vaste Kinström (1673–1738) and Rebecka Wetterström (died 1729). His father came from Kisa and his mother possibly belonged to the Wetterström family which is connected to Malexander. Kinström studied in Uppsala in 1730–1731. He was the cathedral organist in 1736–1737 in Strängnäs cathedral. Kinström was organist 1738–1763 in Ladugårdsland in Stockholm and had his workplace in Hedvig Eleonora church. They lived there in the block Walfisken no. 39. In 1741 he was offered a position as cathedral organist in Turku Cathedral, but never took up the position.

In 1742, Kinström was granted the privilege to build harpsichords, clavichords, clavier d'amours, and more. He also built cymbals and organ works.

He owned a house in the Walfisken block, number 35, in Hedvig Eleonora.

Kinström died of a stroke in 1763 in Hedvig Eleonora and was buried on December 10. After his death, his widow Christina became the proprietor of the firm bearing his name, with the journeyman Matthias Lundbom working for her.

== Family ==
Kinström married Maria Elisabeth Ekman (died 1748) around 1736. She was the daughter of the organist Lars Ekman in Strängnäs. Together they had Rebecka Christina (born before 1736), Johanna Charlotta (born 1739), Catharina Elisabeth (born 1742), Maja Gretha (born 1745) and Jacob (born 1746). Kinström's second marriage was to Christina Westervik on 10 October 1751 in Hedvig Eleonora parish, Stockholm. She was the daughter of the carpenter Erik Westerwik. Together they had the children Lars (born 1753), Erik Vaste (born 1755), son (born 1757) and Johan Gustaf (born 1759).

== Instruments ==
Year	Instrument	Total
1761	A piano and four cymbals	933
1762	-	333
1763	-	466

=== Organs ===
Year	Original church	Diocese	Image	Tunes	Notes
1753	Torneå church	Härnösand diocese		7	The organ was repaired in 1769 by Svalberg.
1762	Hacksta church	Uppsala diocese		7	Built together with Jacob Westervik. A new organ was built in 1932 by Erik Henrik Eriksson, Sundbyberg.

=== Keyboards ===
- 1748 - Clavichord with attached pedal. Today at Jämtland Museum.
- 1752 - Clavichord. Belonged to Vicke Andrén in 1903. Now at the Music Museum, Stockholm.
- Two harpsichords.

== Co-workers ==
- Anders Svalberg (born 1715). He was a journeyman with Kinström in 1754. He was married.
- Jacob Westervik was a journeyman with Kinström in 1760.
- Matthias Lundbom was an apprentice with Kinström in 1760.

== Sources ==
- Stockholms rådhusrätt part 1 (A, AB) F1A:149 (1751) pages 763-767
- Stockholms rådhusrätt part 1 (A, AB) F1A:197 (1764) pages 949-955
- Stockholms rådhusrätt part 1 (A, AB) F1A:284 (1786) pages 71-75
- Svenskt Klavikordbygge 1720–1820 [Swedish Clavichord Builders 1720–1820] (in Swedish). Stockholm: Eva Helenius-Öberg. 1986. Libris 8347701.
