= Hälleforsnäs =

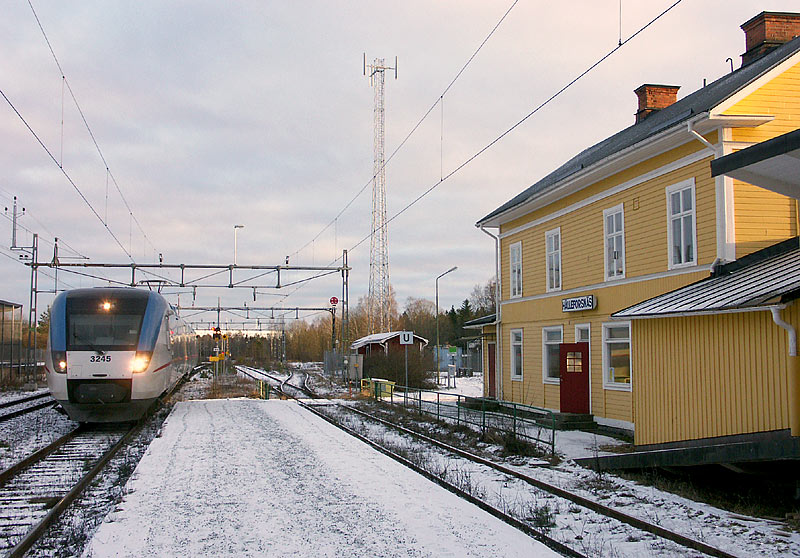
- Hälleforsnäs Train Station

- Location within Södermanland Location within Sweden
- Coordinates: 59°09′10″N 16°29′55″E
- Country: Sweden
- Province: Södermanland
- County: Södermanland County
- Municipality: Flen Municipality

Area
  - Total: 2.44 km^{2} (0.94 sq mi)

Population (31 December 2020)
  - Total: 1,615
  - Density: 662/km^{2} (1,710/sq mi)
- Time zone: UTC+1 (CET)
  - Summer (DST): UTC+2 (CEST)

Hälleforsnäs is a locality in Flen Municipality, Södermanland County, Sweden with approximately 2000 inhabitants in 2020.

A small village in the municipality of Flen, it is 15 km (9 miles) from Flen, 32 km (20 miles) from Eskilstuna, 40 km (25 miles) from Katrineholm and 120 km (75 mi) south-west of Stockholm.

This village was an industrial center until the foundry it was built around ceased operations after 350 years in the early 1990s. The foundry is now a cultural center and a hub of activity.

Beginning in the 17th century, the foundry functioned as a cannon workshop. Here, cannons were manufactured for the Swedish army in Europe. The foundry switched from producing military products to civilian radiators and stoves at the beginning of the 20th century. Between 1920 and 1980, pipes and other plumbing supplies were the company's primary products.

In the 1960s, when the foundry was at its peak, more than a thousand people worked there, as well as a few hundred in related occupations nearby.

Electrolux acquired the foundry in the 1980s and began manufacturing cookware plates. In 1990, Electrolux ceased operations, and several employees acquired the foundry. The area surrounding the foundry is still active, but less so than when it served as the village's focal point.

Today, the actual foundry serves as a center for local artists, and Hälleforsnäs has become the cultural heart of Sörmland. Both a restaurant and a seasonal herbal store are present. Moreover, the Jürss dairy company manufactures and sells award-winning cheese on-site.

== Riksdag elections ==
Due to its industrialization, Hälleforsnäs has always been a stronghold for the Swedish Social Democratic Party. Since it has always been Flen Municipality's most left-leaning district, it has contributed to large majorities throughout the municipality. With fewer people living in Hälleforsnäs, fewer people voting, and more people migrating to cities in Swedish industrial areas at the end of the 20th century, the number of votes cast there has significantly decreased. The vote share of the Social Democrats in the village decreased by 29 percentage points between 1994 and 2018, while the vote share of the Sweden Democrats grew rapidly.

Year	%	Votes	V	S	MP	C	L	KD	M	SD	NyD	Left	Right
1973	94.0	1,530	3.9	71.3		12.9	5.9	1.5	4.2			75.2	23.0
1976	94.5	1,534	4.2	71.6		11.7	7.0	1.0	4.2			75.8	23.9
1979	93.4	1,495	4.9	73.8		8.6	6.1	1.3	5.5			78.7	20.2
1982	95.2	1,479	7.0	74.0	0.9	6.6	4.3	0.5	6.8			80.9	17.6
1985	93.2	1,437	7.8	74.3	0.6	4.6	7.0		5.7			82.0	17.3
1988	89.3	1,325	7.7	72.6	1.9	5.6	6.4	1.7	4.0			82.3	16.0
1991	90.4	1,294	6.9	67.9	2.2	4.5	5.6	3.0	6.3		3.2	74.7	19.4
1994	89.8	1,289	8.9	72.9	3.0	1.8	3.5	2.2	6.8			84.9	14.3
1998	83.5	1,121	15.3	61.9	2.7	1.7	2.0	6.7	8.5			80.5	18.8
2002	80.9	1,033	9.1	66.7	2.2	2.0	5.9	6.3	6.3	0.5		78.0	20.5
2006	79.3	996	7.2	63.2	3.9	2.1	3.5	3.8	12.2	2.7		74.3	21.7
2010	83.4	984	7.5	53.9	3.8	2.4	3.3	3.4	16.3	8.6		65.1	25.3
2014	80.4	976	5.3	52.2	3.4	2.9	2.4	2.2	11.3	18.2		60.8	18.6
2018	82.9	931	7.3	43.6	2.8	3.3	2.0	3.5	8.6	26.9		57.0	41.0
