= Hälleforsnäs railway station =

Railway station in Sweden

Coordinates: 59°09′42″N 16°30′14″E

Hälleforsnäs
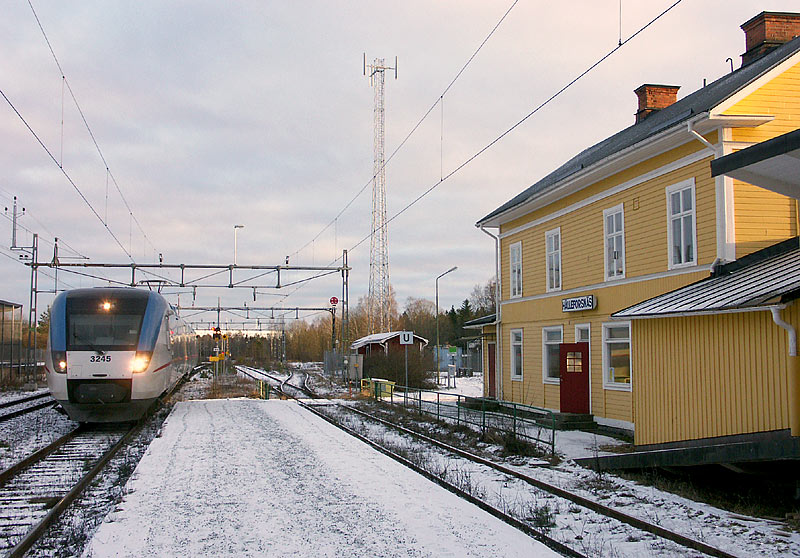
- Hälleforsnäs station building and platform

General information
- Location: Södermanland County; Sweden
- Elevation: 62 metres (203 ft)
- Line: Sala-Oxelösund railway

Other information
- Station code: Hnä

History
- Opened: 1877

Services
Preceding station	Regional trains	Following station
Eskilstuna Central towards Uppsala Central	Mälartåg	Flen towards Linköping Central
Location

Hälleforsnäs railway station is the main train station of Hälleforsnäs, Sweden. It located between Eskilstuna and Flen on the Sala–Oxelösund line and is served by SJ Regional passenger trains traveling between Sala and Linköping, usually called UVEN.
