= Läggesta railway station =

Railway station in Strängnäs, Sweden

Läggesta

General information
- Location: Mariefred, Strängnäs; Sweden
- Coordinates: 59°14′55″N 17°10′3″E
- Operator: Trafikverket
- Line: Svealandsbanan
- Distance: 67 km (Stockholm C)
- Tracks: 3 (lower level); 2 (upper level)

History
- Opened: 1895 (lower level); 1997 (upper level)
Location

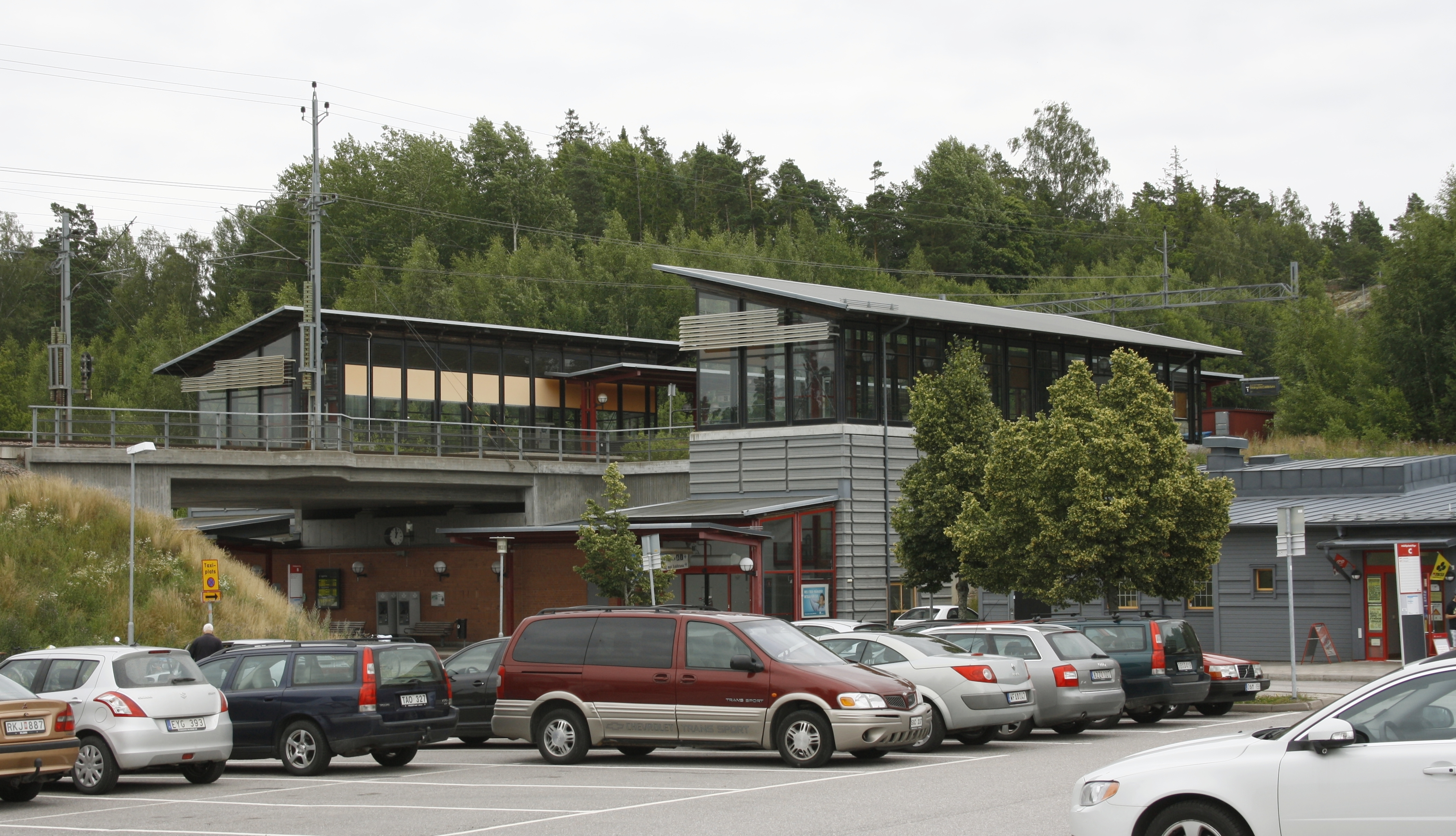
Läggesta (Upper) Railway Station

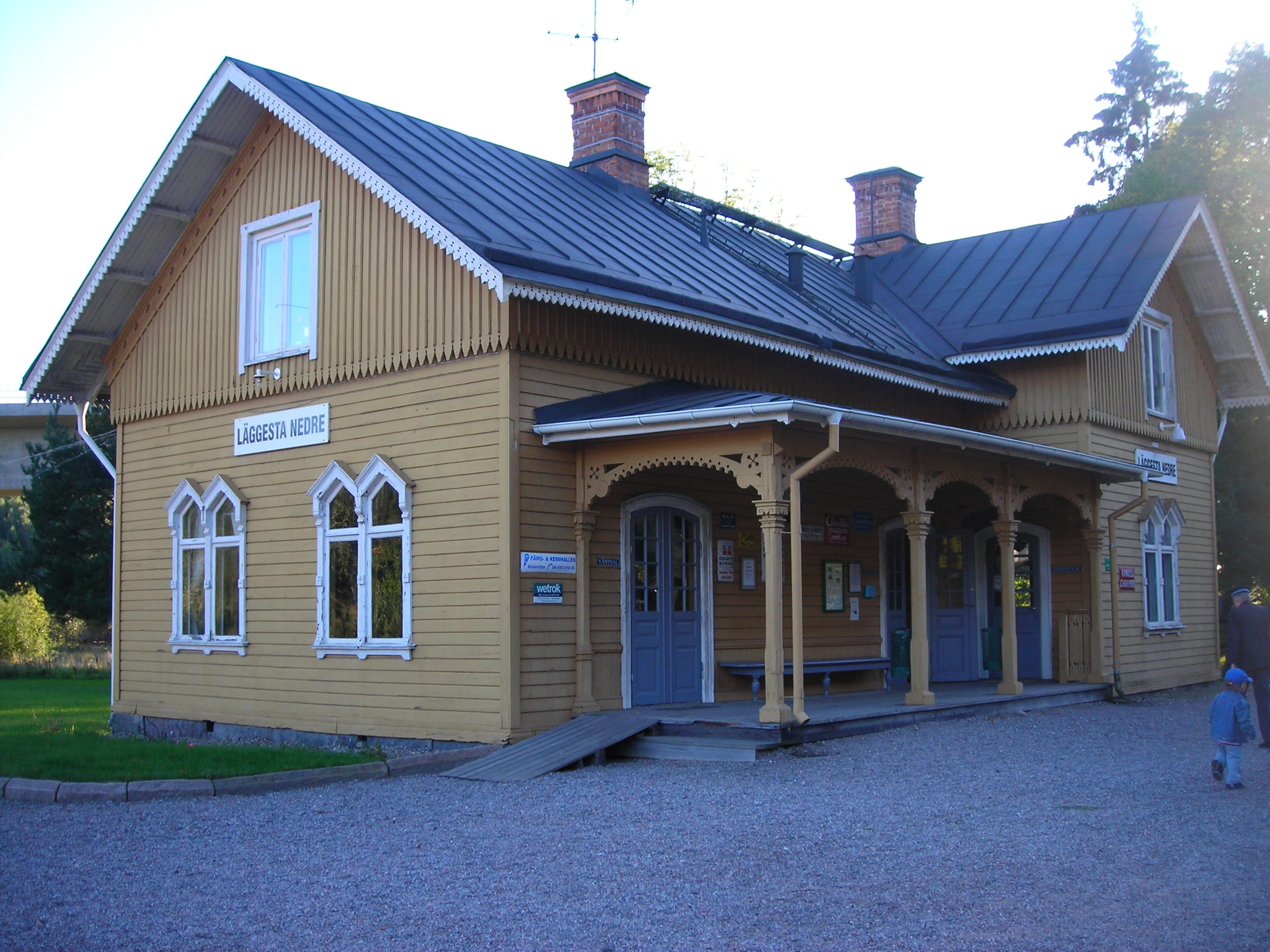
Läggesta Lower Railway Station

Läggesta railway station is a railway station on Svealandsbanan near the small town of Mariefred in Strängnäs municipality, Sweden.

Läggesta railway station is the nearest station for all-year rail traffic for visitors to Mariefred and to the Gripsholm Castle in Mariefred, to which regular buses leave from the railway station. There is also a museum railway, Östra Södermanlands Järnväg, with 600 mm (1 ft 11 5/8 in) gauge, going from Läggesta to Mariefred in the summer. Its station, Läggesta Lower Station (Swedish: Läggesta nedre station), is located under a bridge which is part of the mainline station of Läggesta.
