= X40 =

X40 may refer to:

- Boeing X-40, test platform for the X-37 Future-X Reusable Launch Vehicle
- SJ X40, series of electric multiple units operated by SJ of Sweden
- Southern Vectis route X40, bus route on the Isle of Wight, England
- ThinkPad X40, laptop computer by Lenovo
- Bestune X40, a subcompact crossover
