= Kungsör =

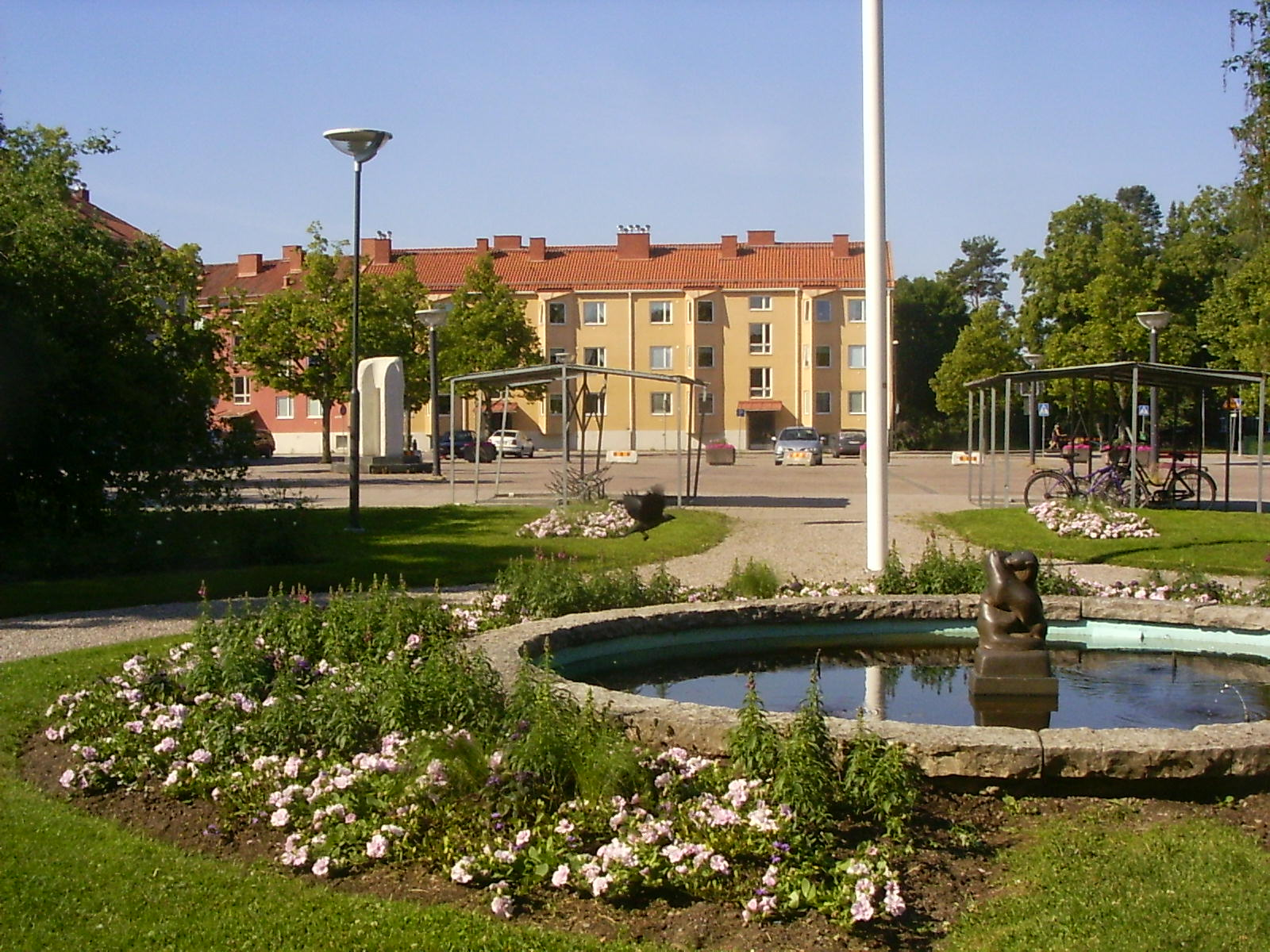
- Central Kungsör

- Location within Västmanland Location within Sweden
- Coordinates: 59°25′25″N 16°05′45″E
- Country: Sweden
- Province: Södermanland
- County: Västmanland County
- Municipality: Kungsör Municipality

Area
  - Total: 4.71 km^{2} (1.82 sq mi)

Population (31 December 2010)
  - Total: 5,452
  - Density: 1,157/km^{2} (3,000/sq mi)
- Time zone: UTC+1 (CET)
  - Summer (DST): UTC+2 (CEST)

Kungsör is a locality and the seat of Kungsör Municipality in Västmanland County, Sweden with 5,452 inhabitants in 2010.

== Gallery ==
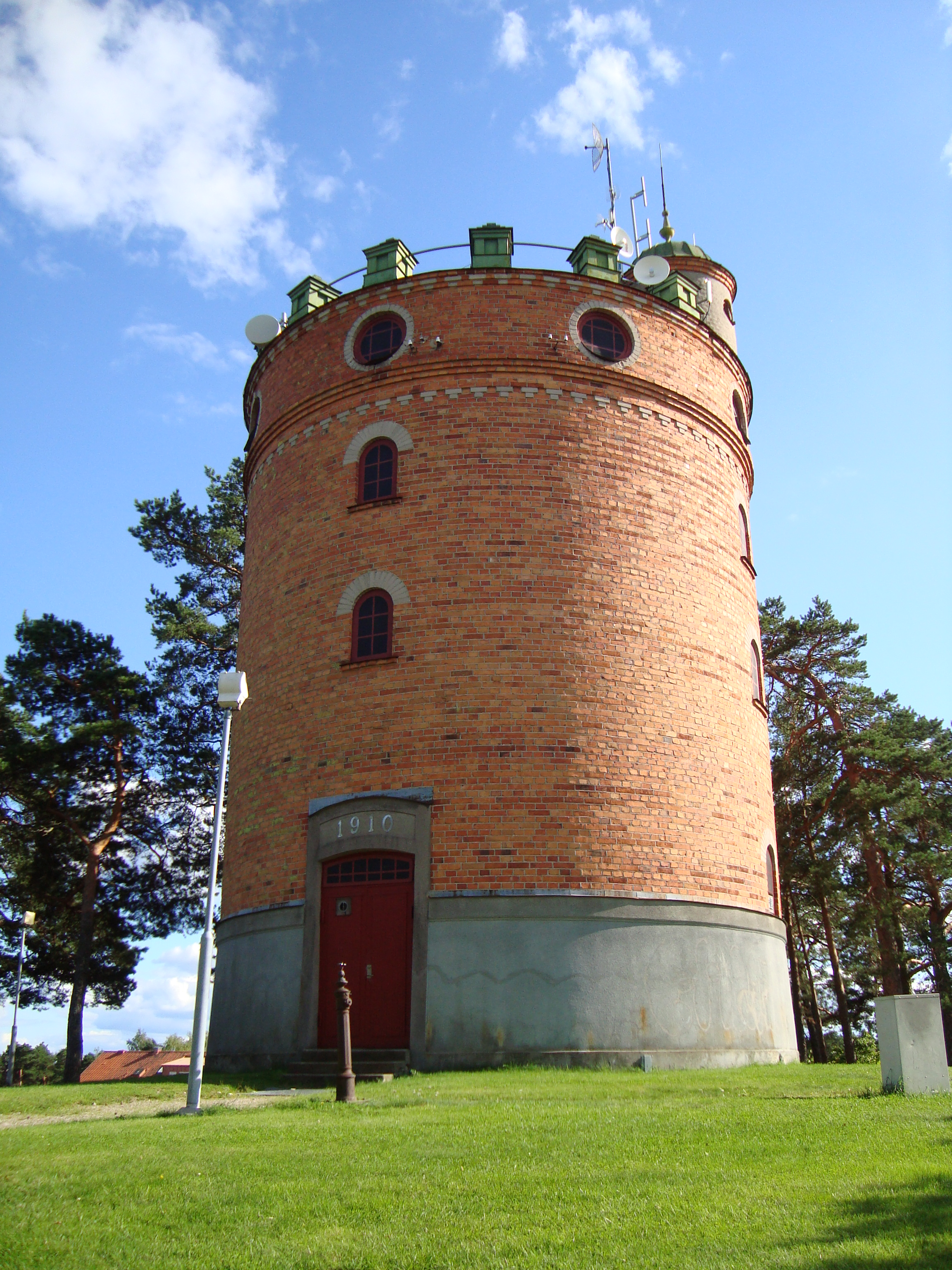
The water tower

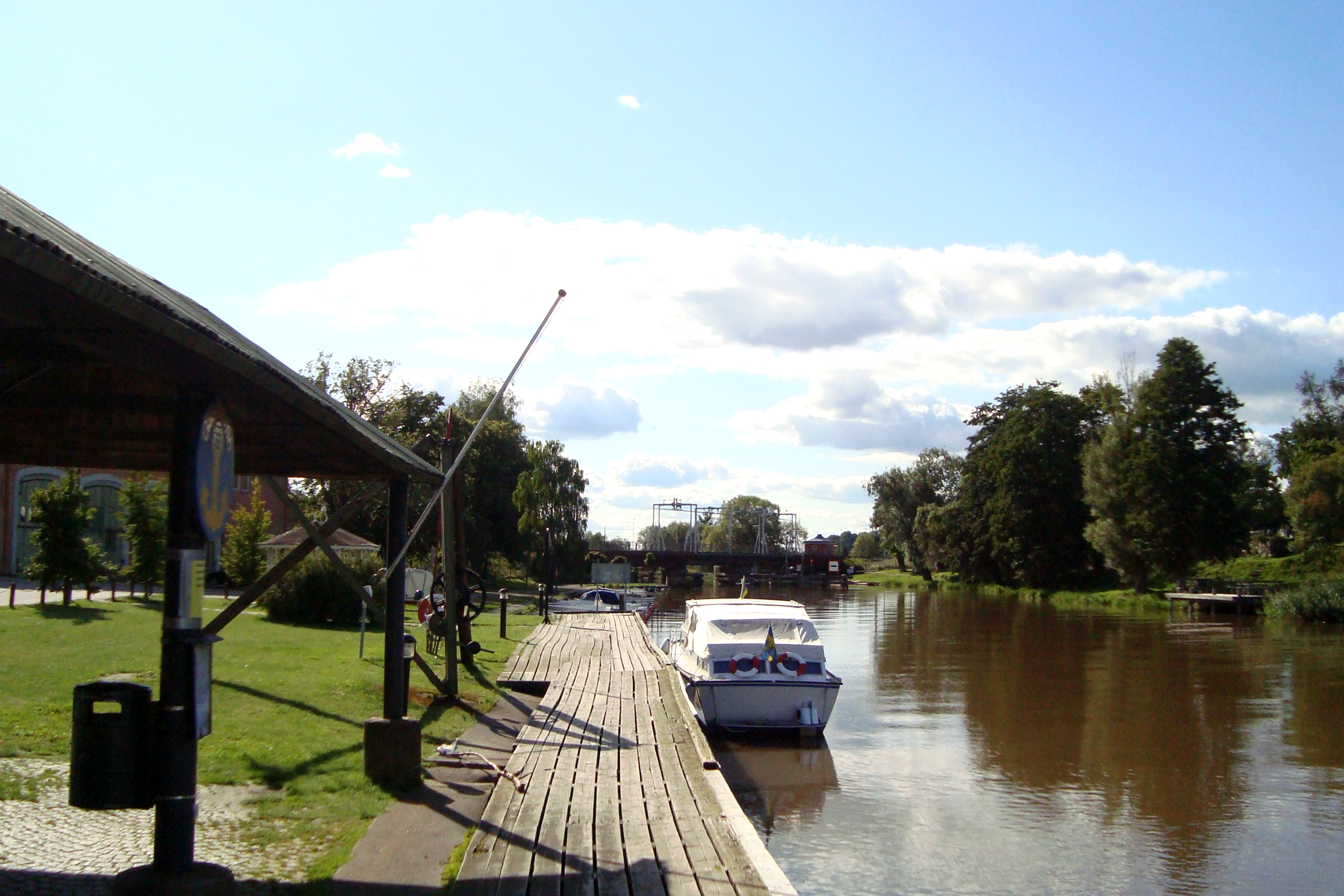
The harbour

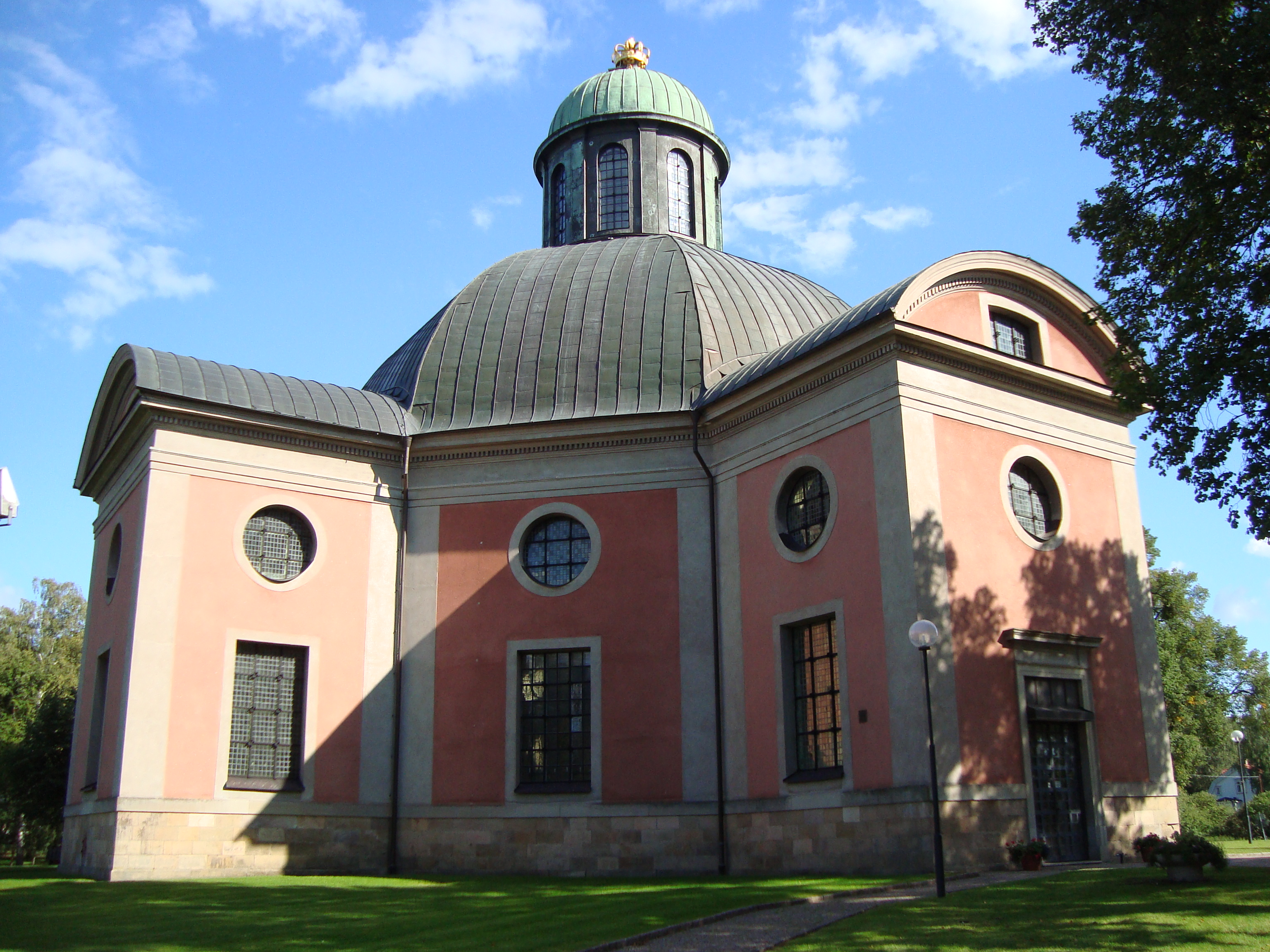
Church of Kung Karl
