= Valskog =

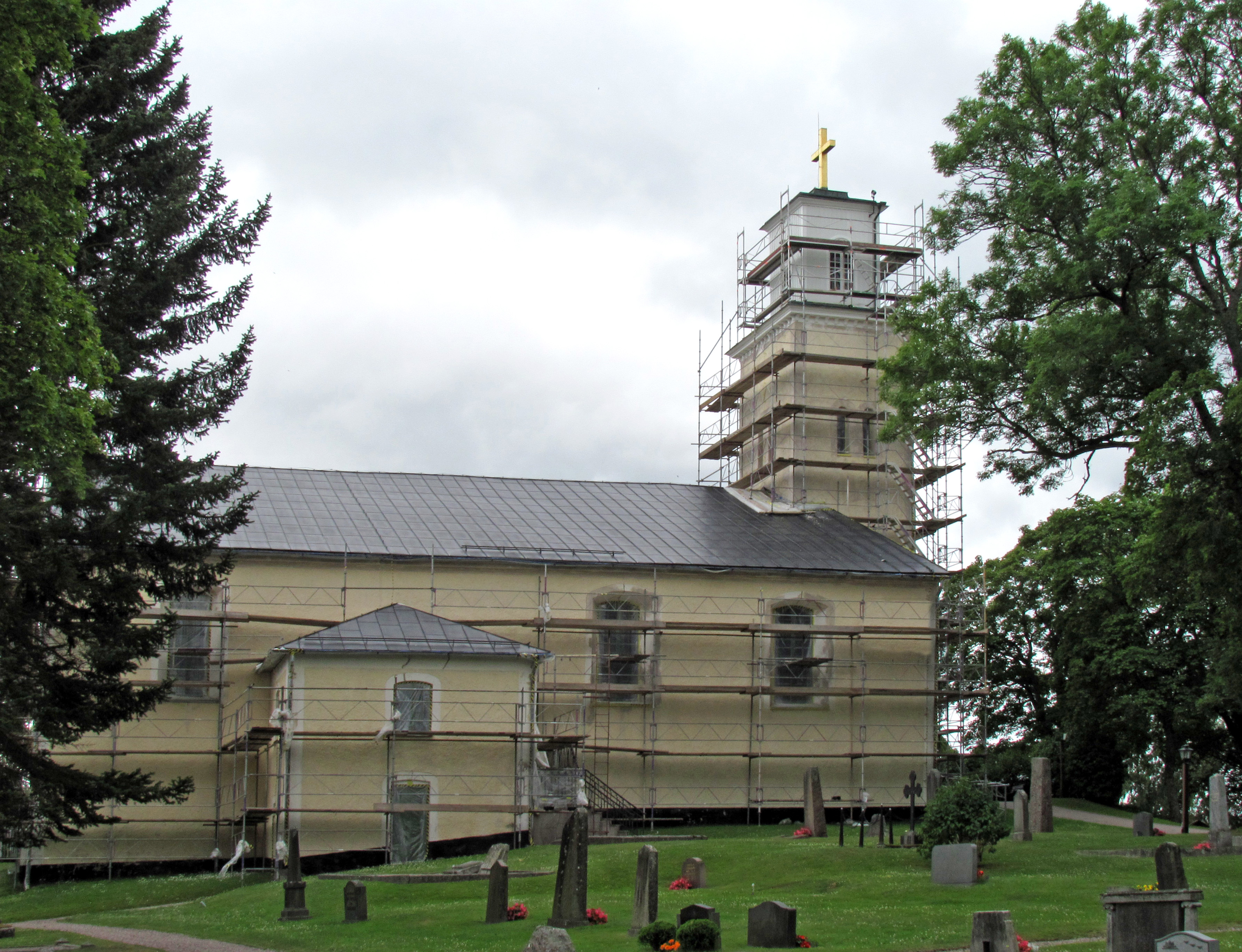
- Björskog Church in Valskog

- Location within Västmanland Location within Sweden
- Coordinates: 59°26′N 15°56′E
- Country: Sweden
- Province: Västmanland
- County: Västmanland County
- Municipality: Kungsör Municipality

Area
  - Total: 0.89 km^{2} (0.34 sq mi)

Population (31 December 2010)
  - Total: 694
  - Density: 779/km^{2} (2,020/sq mi)
- Time zone: UTC+1 (CET)
  - Summer (DST): UTC+2 (CEST)

Valskog is a locality situated in Kungsör Municipality, Västmanland County, Sweden with 694 inhabitants in 2010.
