= Kungsör Municipality =

Kungsör Municipality Kungsörs kommun
- Municipality
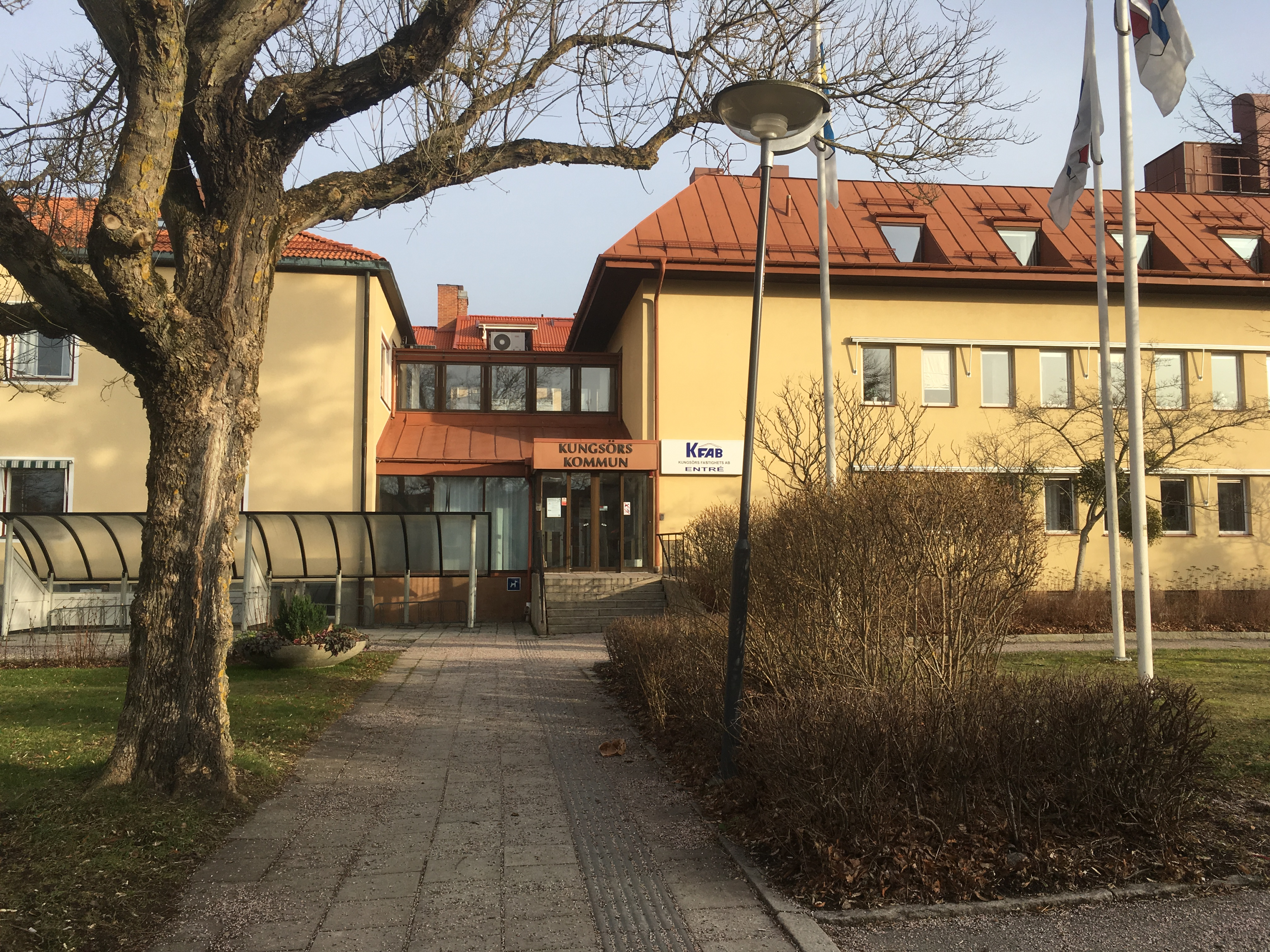
- Kungsörs town hall

- Coat of arms

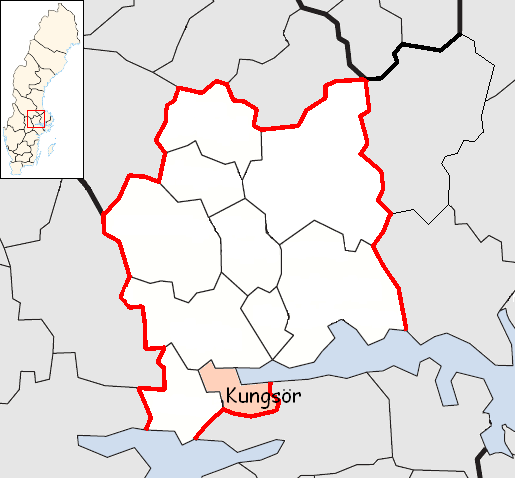
- Coordinates: 59°25′N 16°05′E
- Country: Sweden
- County: Västmanland County
- Seat: Kungsör

Area
  - Total: 227.13 km^{2} (87.70 sq mi)
  - Land: 202.65 km^{2} (78.24 sq mi)
  - Water: 24.48 km^{2} (9.45 sq mi)
- Area as of 1 January 2014.

Population (30 June 2025)
  - Total: 8,630
  - Density: 42.6/km^{2} (110/sq mi)
- Time zone: UTC+1 (CET)
  - Summer (DST): UTC+2 (CEST)
- ISO 3166 code: SE
- Province: Södermanland and Västmanland
- Municipal code: 1960
- Website: www.kungsor.se

Kungsör Municipality (Swedish: Kungsörs kommun) is a municipality in Västmanland County in central Sweden. Its seat is located in the town of Kungsör.

The present municipality was formed in 1971 when Kungsör and Kung Karl (from which Kungsör had been detached as a market town (köping) in 1907) were amalgamated

Kungsör is located at the western end of lake Mälaren. The landscape is open, dominated by fields and meadows.

== Localities ==
- Kungsör (seat)
- Valskog

Historically, the town grew around the Royal Mansion that King Gustav Vasa had built in the 16th century. Parts of the mansion are still preserved and open for visits. It is located on a cape into the Mälaren.

== Demographics ==
This is a demographic table based on Kungsör Municipality's electoral districts in the 2022 Swedish general election sourced from SVT's election platform, in turn taken from SCB official statistics.

In total there were 8,777 residents, including 6,521 Swedish citizens of voting age. 44.1% voted for the left coalition and 54.8% for the right coalition. Indicators are in percentage points except population totals and income.

Location	Residents	Citizen adults	Left vote	Right vote	Employed	Swedish parents	Foreign heritage	Income SEK	Degree
Location			%	%					
Centrum	2,047	1,409	48.7	49.9	66	62	38	18,443	28
Haga-Skillinge	1,697	1,332	43.4	56.1	85	80	20	27,088	37
Runna-Granhammar	2,325	1,673	49.3	49.4	73	70	30	21,637	28
Torpa-Malmberga	1,248	989	40.7	59.0	86	89	11	27,919	29
Valskog-Kungs	1,460	1,118	37.6	61.6	84	85	15	26,944	31
Source: SVT

== Riksdag elections ==
Year	%	Votes	V	S	MP	C	L	KD	M	SD	NyD	Left	Right
1973	92.6	4,931	5.6	49.7		24.9	10.5	1.1	7.9			55.2	43.3
1976	93.2	5,325	4.4	47.1		25.9	12.2	1.0	9.1			51.5	47.2
1979	92.9	5,441	4.7	49.0		19.5	10.9	1.2	14.4			53.7	44.8
1982	93.7	5,555	5.3	50.1	1.8	17.0	6.9	1.3	17.5			55.4	41.4
1985	91.0	5,474	5.0	49.5	2.2	13.3	13.2		16.4			54.5	42.9
1988	87.5	5,247	5.7	48.5	5.9	13.0	12.1	1.9	12.3			60.1	37.3
1991	87.2	5,370	4.3	43.2	3.7	9.5	9.9	5.5	16.8		7.0	47.5	41.6
1994	87.3	5,377	7.2	49.0	5.4	8.9	6.0	2.8	18.2		0.9	61.6	35.9
1998	81.9	4,892	13.6	39.7	4.4	7.2	3.9	10.7	19.0			57.8	40.7
2002	80.2	4,820	8.3	45.3	3.6	8.9	11.7	8.5	12.2	0.5		57.2	41.2
2006	81.1	4,963	5.8	38.8	3.7	10.9	5.6	5.0	23.4	3.2		48.2	46.0
2010	84.8	5,206	5.7	35.3	5.0	6.9	7.0	4.8	27.3	7.1		46.0	45.9
2014	86.2	5,332	5.0	36.3	3.6	7.2	4.9	4.4	18.7	17.5		45.0	35.2
2018	88.3	5,370	5.9	31.4	2.1	8.6	4.4	5.6	16.7	23.9		47.9	50.6

== Sister city ==
- Spydeberg, Norway
