= Strängnäs =

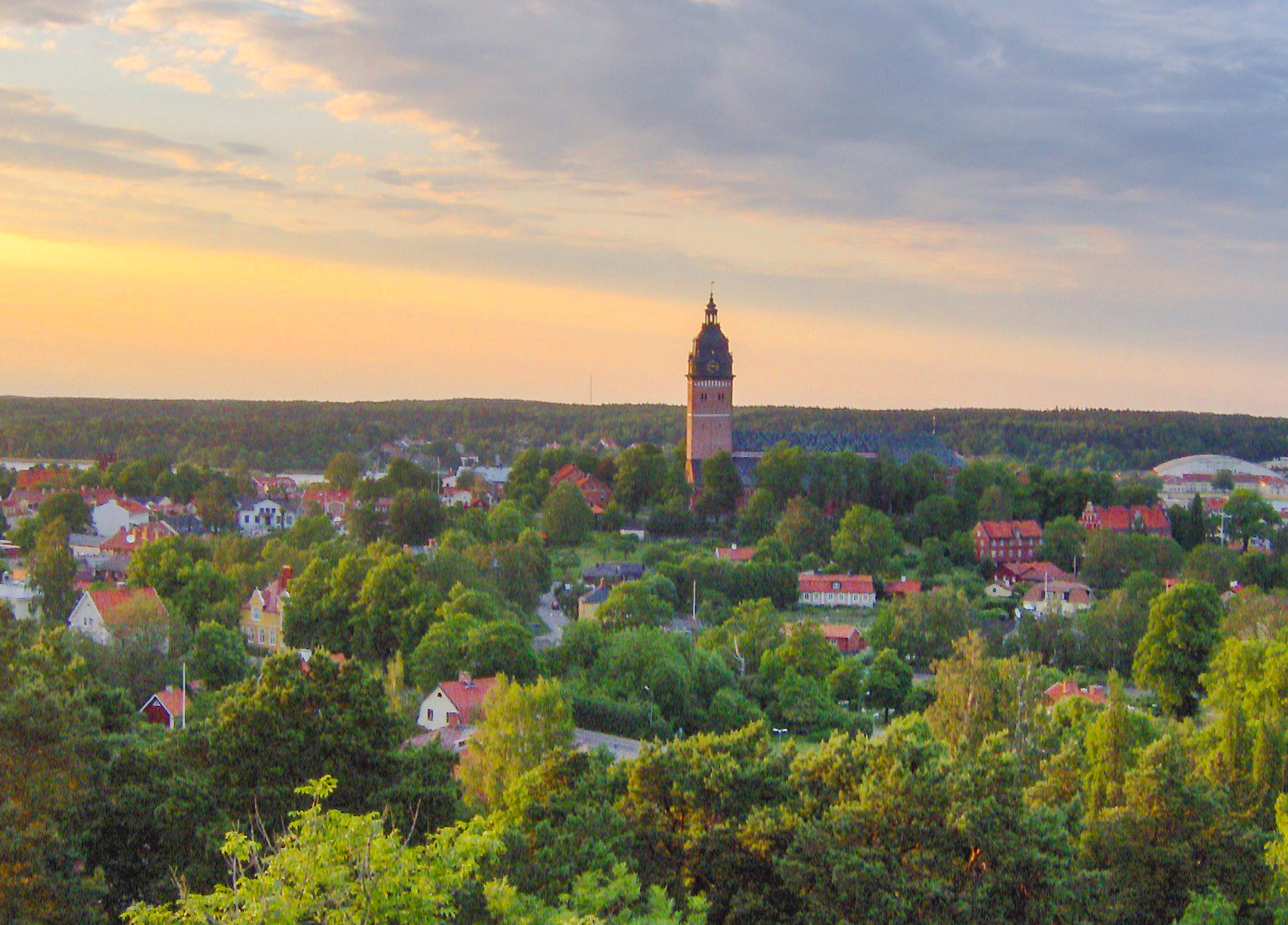
- Seen from the south

- Location within Södermanland Location within Sweden
- Coordinates: 59°22′N 17°02′E
- Country: Sweden
- Province: Södermanland
- County: Södermanland County
- Municipality: Strängnäs Municipality

Area
  - Total: 975.09 km^{2} (376.48 sq mi)

Population (31 December 2020)
  - Total: 38,526
  - Density: 40/km^{2} (100/sq mi)
- Time zone: UTC+1 (CET)
  - Summer (DST): UTC+2 (CEST)

Strängnäs is a locality and the seat of Strängnäs Municipality, Södermanland County, Sweden with 15,363 inhabitants in 2020. It is located by Lake Mälaren and is the episcopal see of the Diocese of Strängnäs, one of the thirteen dioceses of the Church of Sweden. Prominently located on a hilltop, Strängnäs Cathedral, built between 1291 and 1340, is an important landmark.

== Etymology ==
The city's name is first encountered in 1120, in reference to the Diocese. The name Strängnäs is derived from the fact that the city is located near a strait and on several hills, especially on two major ones, the "Mill Hill" and the "Cathedral Hill". In Old Norse strengr indicates a "narrow channel of water" and nes refers to an "isthmus", "narrow peninsula", or " headland", a very common toponymic in Scandinavia.

== History ==
A monastery was established around 1250, and the cathedral inaugurated in 1291, with the town subsequently evolving around these two institutions.

The oldest known city charter was granted in 1336 by King Magnus Eriksson. Strängnäs became a city of importance in the Södermanland province, as the location of the governing thing and also of an annual market. King Gustav Vasa was elected king in Strängnäs in 1523, and delivered his first speech from a position adjacent to the cathedral.

In the 15th and 16th centuries Strängnäs had an important place in the history of Sweden, particularly through the Reformation era. Strängnäs was the native city of prominent reformer Laurentius Andreae and the home city of both Andreae and Olaus Petri.

It became a regional centre of education and scholarship, and in 1626 the Thomas Gymnasium was established by King Gustavus Adolphus, and is today Sweden's second oldest operating gymnasium.

The urban and economic development of Strängnäs seems to have slowed after the Reformation, only flourishing temporarily with the arrival of energetic bishops. The city was slow to engage with the 19th century industrial development and investment found in other areas. A significant fire in 1871 led to large-scale reconstruction of the city, from which time its current appearance stems.

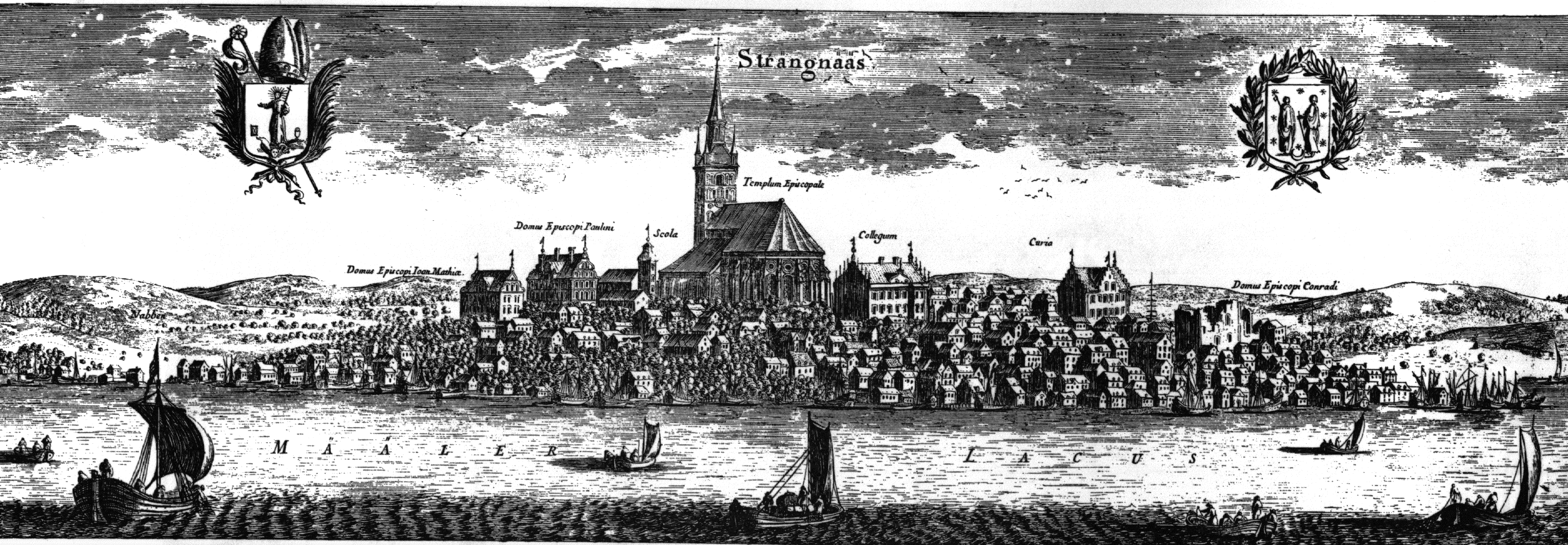
Strängnäs circa 1700, in Suecia antiqua et hodierna.

The city was accidentally bombed by the Soviet Union during World War II, causing minor damage.

In 1962 a runestone known as Strängnäs stone was discovered during the demolition of an old stove in a house at Klostergatan 4. The stone is a piece of jotnian sandstone inscribed with runes written in Proto-Norse, in Elder Futhark alphabet.

== Contemporary life ==
Many of the inhabitants of Strängnäs commute to Stockholm, Södertälje and Eskilstuna. European route E20 passes the city, and there is a mainline railway station with direct services to and from the capital Stockholm.

Tourism is a significant element of the city's economy, with the brick gothic cathedral (with celebrated statues, artworks, and historical archives) attracting many visitors, as well as the attraction of natural features, particularly the lake.

The extreme metal band Merciless was formed in Strängnäs.

=== Museums ===
- Swedish Tank Museum Arsenalen

== Gallery ==
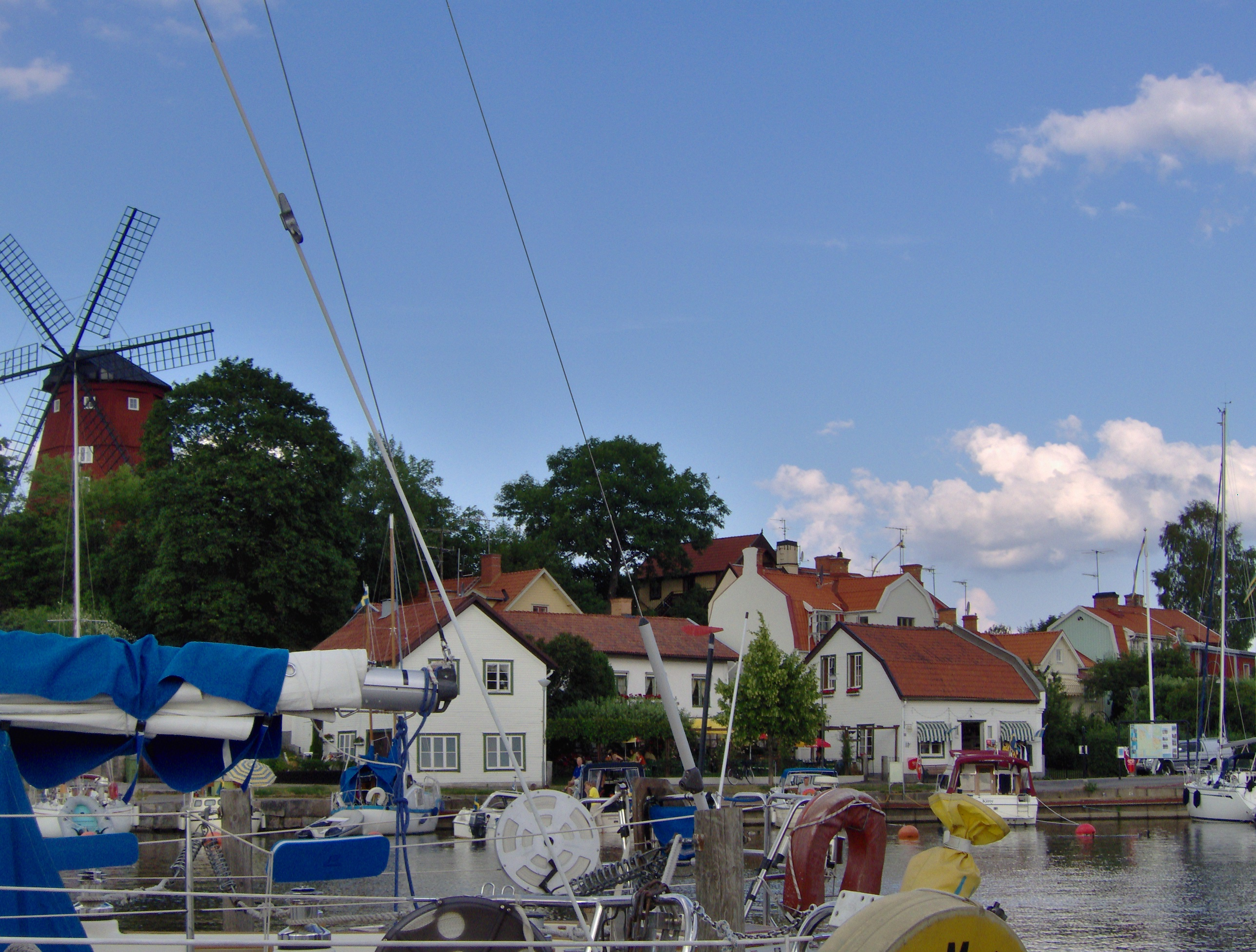
Harbour and old windmill

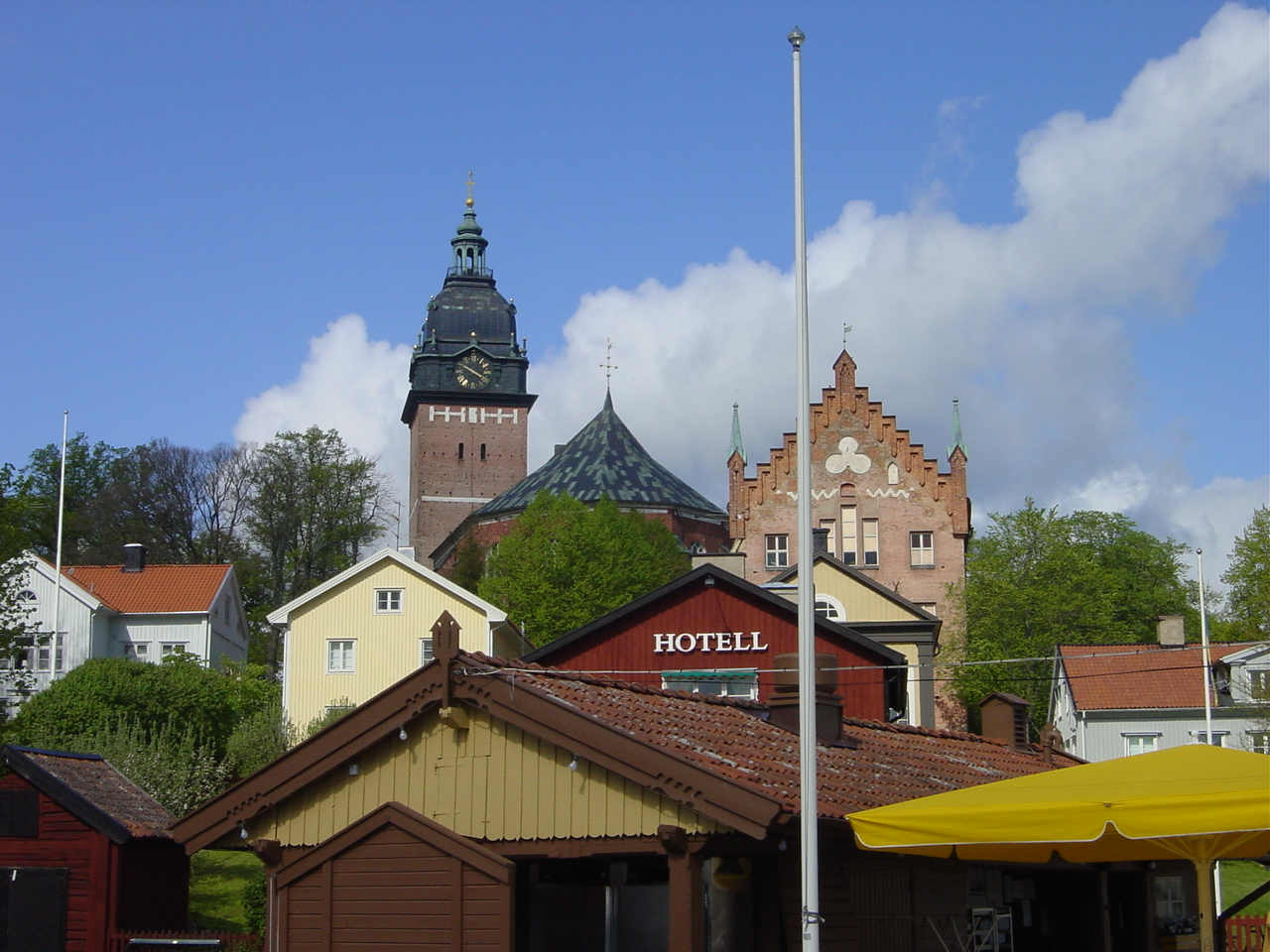
Houses in Strängnäs

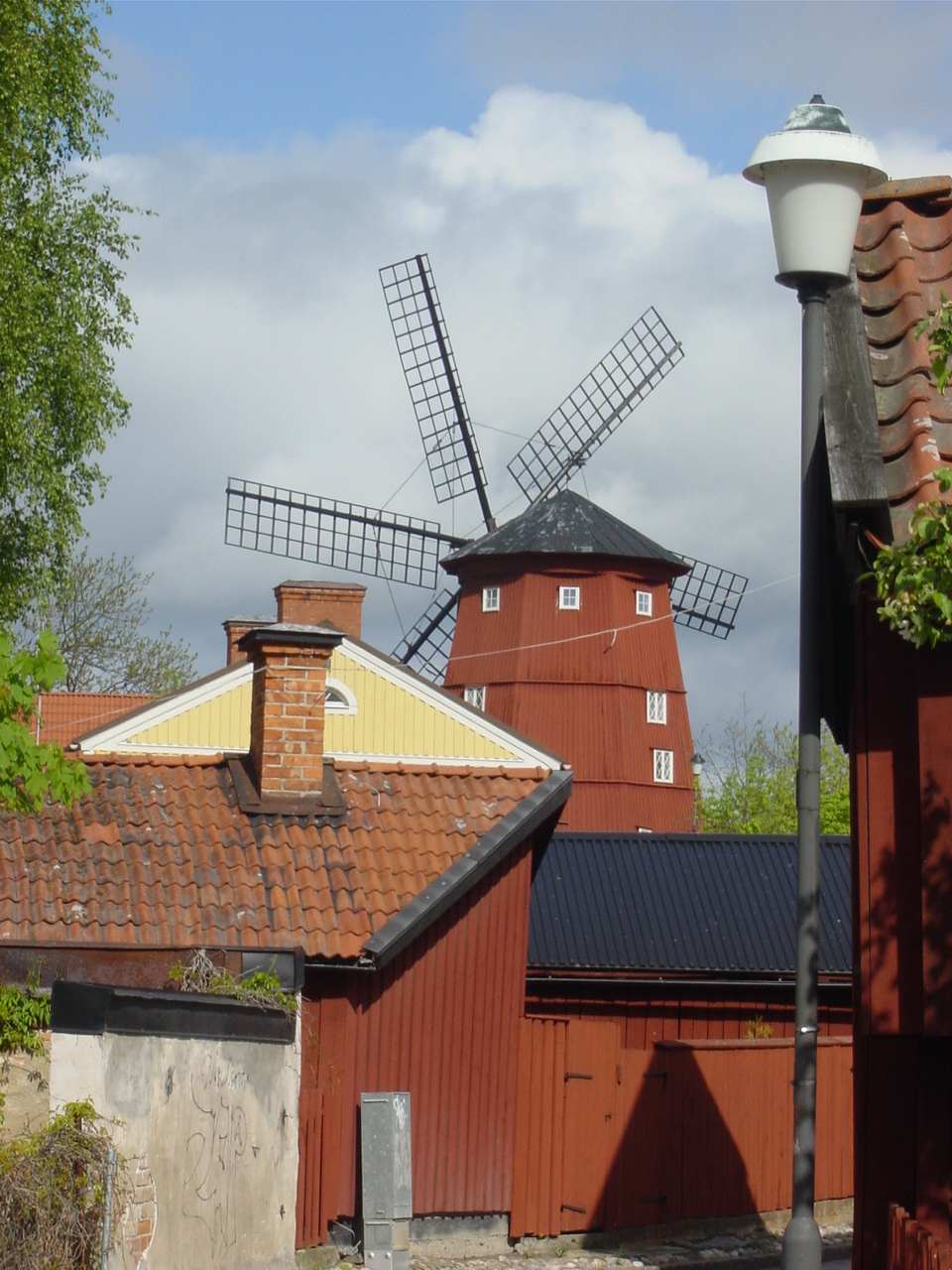
Old mill in Strängnäs

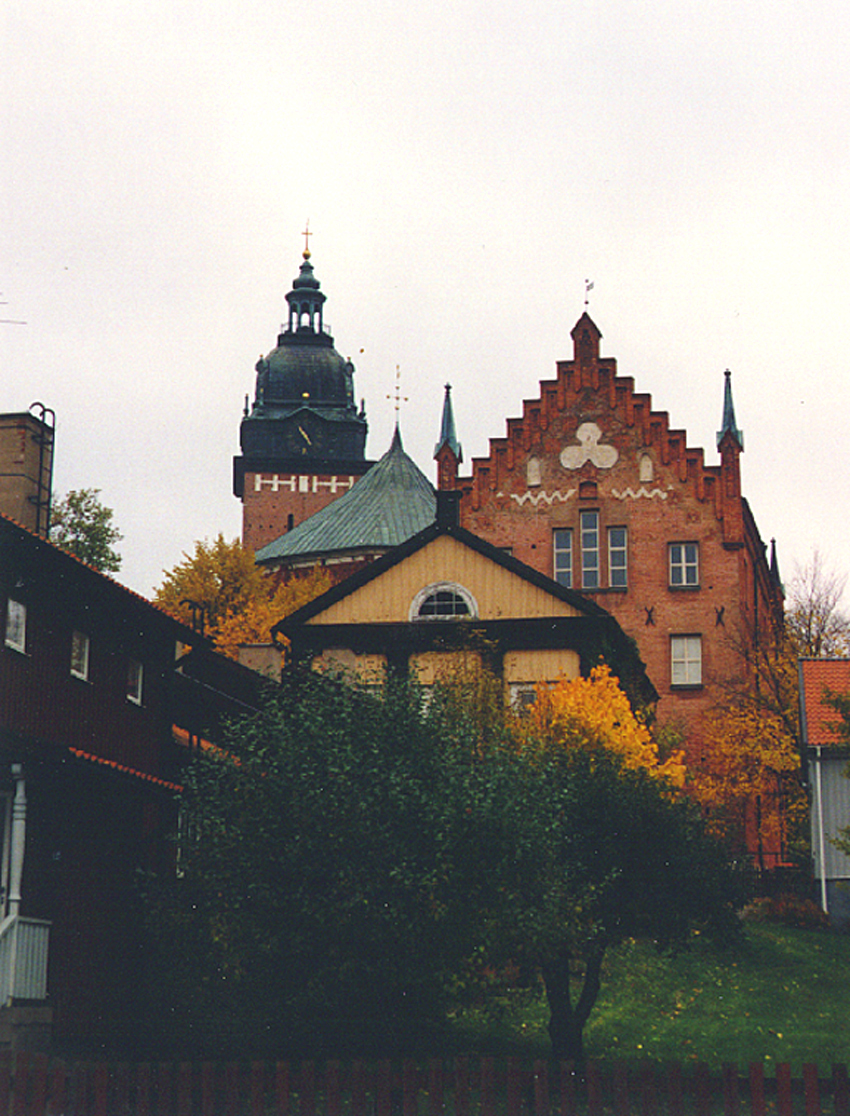
The Cathedral of Strängnäs
