= Francisrosea =

Scientific classification
- Kingdom: Fungi
- Division: Ascomycota
- Class: Lecanoromycetes
- Order: Gyalectales
- Family: Gyalectaceae
- Genus: Francisrosea; Ertz & Sanderson (2021)
- Species: F. bicolor

Binomial name
- Francisrosea bicolor Ertz & Sanderson (2021)

Single-species lichen genus

Francisrosea is a fungal genus in the family Gyalectaceae. It was established in 2021 to accommodate the distinctive species Francisrosea bicolor, a crustose, bark-dwelling lichen from Great Britain. The genus is characterised by an inconspicuous, mostly immersed thallus and small, two-toned, powdery reproductive patches (soralia) without detectable lichen substances.

== Taxonomy ==
Francisrosea was circumscribed by Damien Ertz and Neil Sanderson in 2021. The type and only species is F. bicolor; the holotype was collected in the New Forest (Hampshire, England) from a wound track on ancient Fagus sylvatica (voucher Sanderson 2200, BR). The genus was erected following multilocus DNA analyses, which recovered Francisrosea as a distinct lineage sister to a clade including Gyalidea praetermissa, Neopetractis and Ramonia. Although placed in the family Gyalectaceae in the protologue, the authors noted that family-level limits remain unsettled because the broader tree backbone is poorly resolved.

The generic name honours the British field botanist and woodland lichen specialist Francis Rose (1921–2006). The specific epithet bicolor refers to the two-coloured soralia.

== Description ==
The thallus is immersed in the outer bark and usually visible only where the soralia break through the surface. Soralia are discrete, slightly domed and erumpent, typically 0.2–0.8 mm across, pale green internally with an orange-ochre surface and rim, which gives a bicoloured appearance; they are usually scattered but may rarely occur in small clusters of up to four, forming patches to about 1.5 mm across. Soredia are without projecting hyphae and measure (25–)30–50(–70) μm; the photobiont is trentepohlioid, with algal cells 6–13 μm across occurring in short chains of 2–6 (less often up to 8) cells. Hyphae are I−, KI−; no crystals are seen in polarised light. Standard spot tests are negative (K−, C−, KC−, PD−, UV−) and thin-layer chromatography detected no acetone-soluble secondary metabolites. Sexual structures are unknown for Francisrosea; apothecia and pycnidia have not been observed.

== Distribution and habitat ==
Francisrosea bicolor has a stronghold in the New Forest, Hampshire, where it has been recorded from 26 woods since 1992. It is most frequently found in long, shaded wound tracks on mature or senescent Fagus sylvatica and less often on Quercus robur; associated growths include algae films and bryophytes such as Metzgeria furcata and Zygodon rupestris. A confirmed outlying British record is from a wound track on ancient Quercus at Rydal Park, Lake District. Outside the New Forest the true distribution is unclear due to past confusion with superficially similar taxa, but it is probably present in Exmoor and North Wales.

== Similar species ==
Francisrosea bicolor has often been confused with Thelopsis corticola, which also forms ochre-tinged soralia on bark. In T. corticola the soralia are typically finer and more compact, more frequently confluent into larger (2–3 mm) patches, and the soredia are smaller (about 10–17 μm); T. corticola can also bear perithecia, whereas F. bicolor is only known sterile. Other orange-sorediate crusts differ chemically or structurally: Porina multipuncta has numerous minute, uniformly bright orange soralia; Zwackhia sorediifera has C+ (pink-red) soralia; and Caloplaca lucifuga has soralia reacting K+ (purple).
