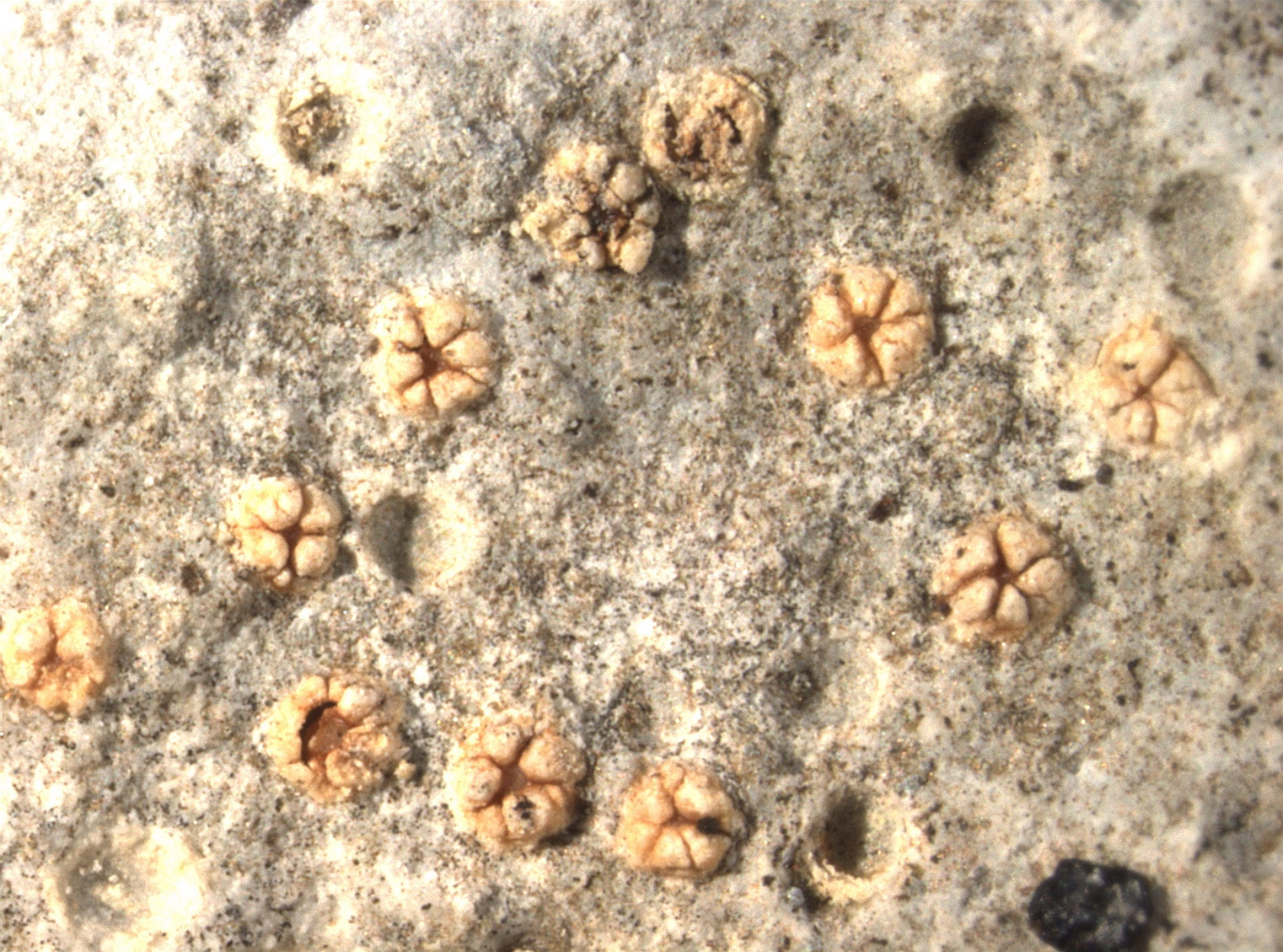
- Fruiting bodies of Petractis clausa

Scientific classification
- Kingdom: Fungi
- Division: Ascomycota
- Class: Lecanoromycetes
- Order: incertae sedis
- Family: incertae sedis
- Genus: Petractis; Fr. (1845)

Type species
- Petractis exanthematica (Sm.) Fr. (1845)

Species
- P. clausa P. hypoleuca

= Petractis =

Genus of lichen-forming fungi

Petractis is a small genus of lichen-forming fungi of uncertain familial and ordinal placement in the Lecanoromycetes. These inconspicuous lichens grow as thin crusts embedded within rock surfaces, partnering with cyanobacteria to form barely visible films that are primarily detected by their small, star-shaped fruiting bodies. The genus contains two species that typically inhabit calcareous rocks, where their fruiting structures create distinctive pits in the stone surface after they decay.

== Taxonomy ==
The genus was circumscribed by the mycologist Elias Magnus Fries in 1845. In his brief original description, Fries characterised Petractis as having a stellate (star-shaped) exciple with a fissured margin. He distinguished two forms within his concept of the genus: P. exanthematica (the type species), described as the calcareous form, and P. clausa, noted for its somewhat colourless thallus. Fries classified the genus within his group "Excipula thallinodes" and noted its saxicolous (rock-dwelling) habitat.

In 2021, Damien Ertz and colleagues used multilocus DNA data to reassess relationships within the family Gyalectaceae. They found that Petractis luetkemuelleri and P. nodispora form a lineage remote from the type species P. clausa and instead cluster next to the genus Ramonia. Both of these limestone‑dwelling species partner with a trentepohlioid (green‑algal) photobiont, whereas P. clausa houses cyanobacteria. Because of this clear genetic and ecological divergence, the authors created the new genus Neopetractis for the two displaced species, designating N. luetkemuelleri as the type and making the necessary new combinations. Their study also transferred P. crozalsii to Gyalecta.

== Description ==
Petractis grows as a thin, crust‑like film that lies immersed in the rock surface, so the lichen itself is scarcely visible except as slight discolouration. Its photosynthetic partner is the cyanobacterium Scytonema, whose chains of cells thread among the fungal hyphae.

The sexual fruiting bodies begin life buried in the substrate as tiny, flask‑ to bowl‑shaped structures. As they expand, they push up the rock into small pustules and develop beneath a circular roof of thallus tissue. This cover splits radially from a central pore, revealing a pore‑like disc when the thallus is moist; in older specimens the cover may disintegrate entirely. Once the fruiting body decays it leaves a neat pit in the stone. The proper exciple—a pale, very thin wall of tightly glued hyphae—separates readily from the thalline cover when the lichen dries. The clear hymenium (fertile spore-bearing tissue) stains blue with iodine, and between the asci run slender, almost unbranched paraphyses that show little swelling at their colourless tips. The asci are roughly cylindrical, have a single thin wall that turns blue in iodine staining, lack any defined apical dome, and contain eight ascospores. These spores are colourless, divided by one or more cross‑walls, and surrounded by a variably distinct outer sheath.

Asexual reproduction occurs in partially immersed pycnidia that release straight, rod‑shaped conidia, again colourless and without internal septa. Thin-layer chromatography has failed to detect any characteristic secondary metabolites in the genus.

== Species ==
Two species comprise the genus Petractis:

- Petractis clausa (Hoffm.) Kremp. (1861)
- Petractis hypoleuca (Ach.) Vězda (1965)

The species Petractis nodispora, described as new by Alan Orange in 2009, has since been transferred to Neopetractis as Neopetractis nodispora. Petractis exanthematica (Sm.) Fr. (1845) is synonymous with P. clausa.
