= Gripsholms hjorthage =

Nature reserve in Södermanland, Sweden

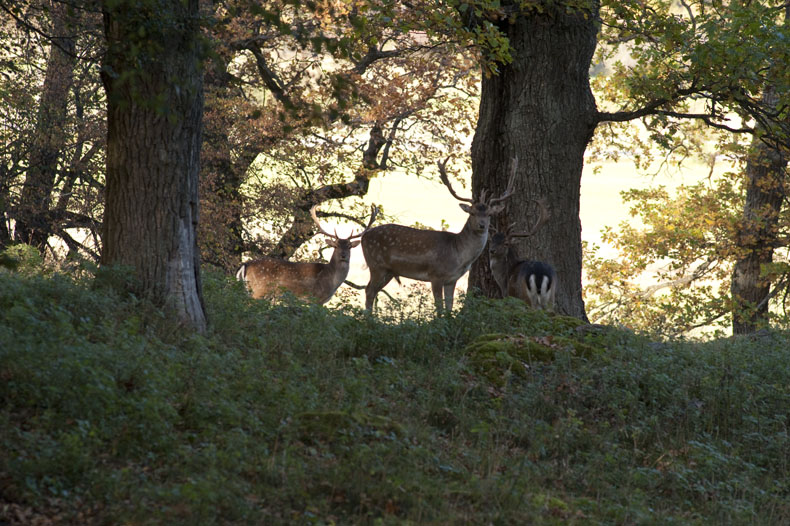
- Deer and oaks in Gripsholms hjorthage

- Location within Södermanland Location within Sweden
- Location: Sweden
- Nearest city: Mariefred
- Coordinates: 59°15′12″N 17°12′16″E
- Area: 48.6 ha (120 acres)
- Established: 2001

Gripsholms hjorthage is a deer park and nature reserve close to Gripsholm Castle in Södermanland County, Sweden. The deer pasture is dominated by many old oak trees. The area has been used for grazing for a long time, and as a deer park since the end of the 19th century.

It was declared a nature reserve in 2001 after the discovery of the red-listed hermit beetle in the area. It is also popular as a recreational area.

== History ==
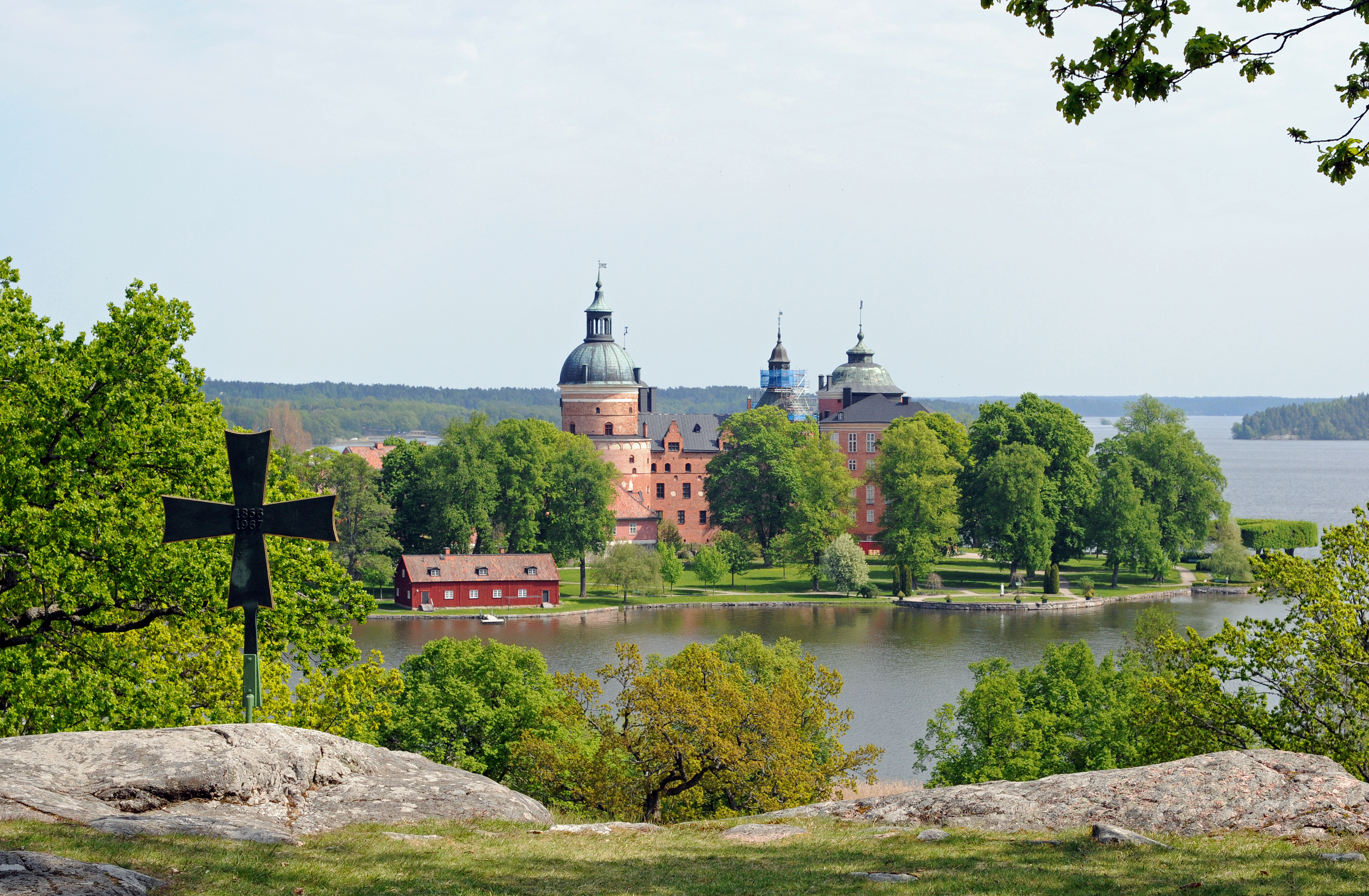
Gripsholm Castle seen from Gripsholms hjorthage. To the left the cross of the Coldinu order.

The area contains traces of old settlements, including a hillfort and a pre-Christian burial site. Its more recent history starts with it being part of a royal estate belonging to nearby Gripsholm Castle, supplying the court with foodstuffs. The estate farm has existed since the 13th century, and since the 17th century the estate has used the area that is today Gripsholms hjorthage as pasture. In the 1860s, King Charles XV of Sweden decided to transform the area into an English landscape garden. Winding paths were laid out, some of which still remain. They led to points of interest in the landscape, such as the cross of iron erected by the fraternal order Coldinuorden. Around 1890 the park was transformed into a deer park, from where its current name derives ("hjorthage" in Swedish means deer park). It was converted into a deer park in order to accommodate deer which were moved from the royal deer park Hjorthagen in Stockholm, which was being built up and transformed into a part of the city.

At the turn of the century, orchards were planted in the area and greenhouses built. Fruit production, mainly apples but also plums and cherries, continued until 1971. It was then considered unprofitable, production ceased and the orchards were cut down.

In 1997, the castellan and another official from Gripsholm Castle informed the County Governor Bo Holmberg that the deer park had financial difficulties. In the following years, the county together with the National Property Board of Sweden and the Swedish National Heritage Board tried to find a solution for the park which would maintain its high natural values and keep the deer in the park. In 2001, the area was declared as a nature reserve, which means it is protected against exploitation and should be maintained to preserve its natural values. The immediate and main reason behind the decision to declare the area a nature reserve was the discovery of hermit beetles in the area; the species is red-listed in Sweden and is a prioritised species according to the European Union's Habitats Directive.

== Description ==
A fallow deer resting in the sun at Gripsholms Hjorthage

The entire nature reserve lies within the fenced-off enclosure for the fallow deer of the park. It is situated c. 400 m (440 yd) west of Gripsholm Castle and is part of the premises of the castle that is within the right of use of the Swedish king (though it is owned by the Swedish state). A minor part of the deer enclosure is not part of the nature reserve.

The area is hilly, particularly in the north eastern and south western parts of the reserve. The majority of the area is pasture dominated by oak trees. The long continuity of grazing, initially by cattle and later by deer, has created a rich natural environment. The area provides grazing for c. 100 deer. The many old, sometimes dying and decaying, trees — mostly oak but also linden — also provide important habitats for several species of insects, lichen and fungi. Most of the oak trees are around 200 years old, but some are considerably older. Several red-listed species of lichen (e.g. Caloplaca lucifuga, Parmelina tiliacea and Nephroma parile) and insects (e.g. Lasius brunneus, Pentaphyllus testaceus and Corticeus fasciatus) have been found in Gripsholms hjorthage, and the area is deemed to have a high botanical and entomological value. The area is popular as a recreational area, and efforts have been made to maintain what remains of the park laid out in the 1860s, and to install new paths and benches for visitors. It is the only remaining deer enclosure adjacent to a royal castle in Sweden.

The nature reserve is deemed to be of interest for research concerning species which are dependent on the presence of old-growth oak trees. Gripsholms hjorthage is part of the EU-wide Natura 2000 network of protected areas.
