= Cryptolechia =

Cryptolechia is the scientific name of two genera of organisms and may refer to:

- Cryptolechia (fungus), a genus of fungi in the family Gyalectaceae
- Cryptolechia (moth), a genus of moths in the family Oecophoridae
