= Belonia =

Belonia may refer to:

- Belonia, India, a town in Tripura, India
  - Belonia (Vidhan Sabha constituency), a legislative assembly constituency of Tripura state, centered around the town
  - Belonia College, now the Iswar Chandra Vidyasagar College
- Battles of Belonia Bulge, during the Bangladesh Liberation War
- Belonia (lichen), a genus within the family Gyalectaceae
