= Gyalecta nana =

Scientific classification
- Kingdom: Fungi
- Division: Ascomycota
- Class: Lecanoromycetes
- Order: Gyalectales
- Family: Gyalectaceae
- Genus: Gyalecta
- Species: G. nana

Binomial name
- Gyalecta nana Tuck. (1862)

Synonyms
- Secoliga nana (Tuck.) Müll.Arg. (1888); Gyalectina nana (Tuck.) Vězda (1969); Cryptolechia nana (Tuck.) D.Hawksw. & Dibben (1982)

Species of lichen-forming fungus

Gyalecta nana is a species of corticolous (bark-dwelling), crustose lichen. It was first described in 1862 by the American lichenologist Edward Tuckerman. In 1969, Antonín Vězda renamed the genus Gyalectina in an effort to denote its 12–16 spores per ascus in comparison to the ≤ 8 spores per ascus of Gyalecta, and research in 1982 posited that G. nana was synonymous with Cryptolechia nana. In 2019 molecular phylogenetics analysis suggested the most appropriate characterization again was Gylecta nana.

== Description ==
This crustose lichen has minute apothecia (fruiting bodies) with 10–12 small, colorless spores per ascus.

== Habitat and distribution ==
The lichen is found on the bark of trees in South America and Africa.
