= Ramón de la Sagra =

Spanish economist, sociologist, botanist, and political writer (1798–1871)

Ramón Dionisio José de la Sagra y Peris
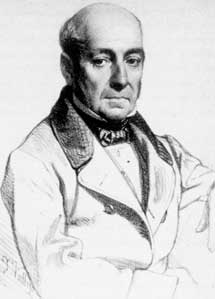
- Portrait of Ramón de la Sagra
- Born: 8 April 1798; A Coruña, Spain
- Died: 23 May 1871 (aged 73); Neuchâtel, Switzerland
- Occupations: botanist, writer, sociologist, economist, politician
- Known for: founding the world's first anarchist journal El Porvenir

Ramón Dionisio José de la Sagra y Peris (8 April 1798 – 23 May 1871) was a Spanish anarchist, politician, writer, and botanist who founded the world's first anarchist journal, El Porvenir (Spanish for "The Future").

== Biography ==
Ramón de la Sagra was born on 8 April 1798 in A Coruña, a province of Spain. His father Lorenzo Martínez de la Sagra came from a noble merchant family, which became wealthy through trade with the Spanish colonies in America. His mother was Antonia Rodríguez Perís, who met his father in Saint Augustine. His brother migrated to Uruguay to start a business there, when Sagra was three years old.

Ramón de la Sagra studied physics for one year in Nautical School of A Coruña. Afterwards he attended the military college of Santiago de Compostela until reaching adulthood. Afterwards he joined the local university, where he studied anatomy, medicine, mathematics and pharmaceuticals. There he started spreading liberal ideas. For these actions the Inquisition started threatening him, until he was transferred at the University of Madrid. There he contributed to the liberal newspaper El Conservador, the name being a case of antiphrasis. In 1821 he migrated to Cuba as an assistant of Agustìn Rodriguez. One year later he was appointed to the position of Professor of Natural History of Cuba. In 1822 he married Manuela Turnes del Rìo. For the next ten years he would travel in the Americas, until settling in Paris in 1835. He traveled to the United States from April 20 to September 23 of 1835 and the following year published Five Monthes in the United States of North America in Paris based on his experiences there. He also accumulated several volumes of pamphlets and economic and scientific reports while traveling in the United States.

In Paris he became a disciple of Pierre-Joseph Proudhon. He returned to Spain in 1837 and was elected a member of the parliament four times (1838, 1840, 1845, 1854) as a representative of the Liberal Party. At the same time he began publishing a thirteen volume history on the political and natural history of Cuba which he would complete in 1857. In 1839 he published Voyage en Hollande et en Belgique sous le rapport de l’instruction primaire, des établissements de bien faisance et des prisons, dans les deux pays (published in Paris, 1839 in French and in Spanish in 1844). In 1845 he founded the world's first anarchist journal El Porvenir, which was closed by Ramón María Narváez, Duke of Galicia. After the French Revolution of 1848, he created with Proudhon the Peoples' Bank of France. In Brussels he met Heinrich Ahrens, disciple of Krause, whose doctrines he proclaimed in Spain before Julian Sanz del Rio. He continued to publish economic, geographic, political, social, and prison reform studies. In 1849 he was expelled from France, because he was spreading Socialist ideas. In 1856 he was expelled from Spain to France by Ramón María Narváez, because he was spreading radical ideas. In Paris he met Karl Marx and Friedrich Engels. There he worked as the consul of Uruguay. He returned to Cuba between 1859 and 1860 and published numerous studies and essays there. At the outbreak of the Franco-Prussian War in 1870 he went to Switzerland, where he died on 23 May 1871 at the age of seventy-three.

== Legacy ==
Ramón de la Sagra is commemorated in the scientific name of two species of Cuban lizards, Anolis sagrei and Diploglossus delasagra.

Also, in 1828 botanist DC. published Sagraea, a genus of flowering plants from the Caribbean belonging to the family Melastomataceae, and named in Ramón de la Sagra's honor. Although it is now listed as a synonym of Miconia Ruiz & Pav. Then in 1862 botanist Ernst Stizenberger published Ramonia, which is a genus of lichenized fungi in the family Gyalectaceae.

== Books ==
- Principios fundamentales para servir de introducción a la Escuela Botánica Agrícola del Jardín Botánico, La Habana, 1824
- Anales de Ciencias, Agricultura, Comercio y Artes, La Habana, 1827-1830
- Contestación al número séptimo del Mensagero Semanal de New York, La Habana, 1829
- Relación de las fiestas... enlace... Fernando VII con María Cristina..., La Habana, 1830
- Reglas para el cultivo... del añil, Madrid, 1831
- Mouvement de la population de la Havane de 1825 á 1830
- Historia económica-política y estadística de la Isla de Cuba, La Habana 1831, edición previa de su monumental Historia física, política y natural de la Isla de Cuba, París, 1832–1861, aparecida en francés, París, 1838-1857
- Memorias de la Institución Agrónoma de La Habana, La Habana, 1834
- Cinco meses en los Estados-Unidos de la América del Norte, París, 1836
- Breve idea de la administración del comercio y de las rentas de la Isla de Cuba durante los años de 1826 a 1834, París, 1836
- Apuntes destinados a ilustrar la discusión del artículo adicional al proyecto de Constitución que dice: «Las provincias de Ultramar serán gobernadas por leyes especiales”, 1837
- Voyage en Hollande et en Bilbao, Belgique sous le rapport de l’instruction primaire, des établissements de bien faisance et des prisons, dans les deux pays, París, 1839, con edición española en 1844
- Banque du Peuple. Théorie et pratique de cette institution, fondée sur la théorie rationelle
- Lecciones de economía social, Madrid, 1840
- Investigaciones para enriquecer las fincas del Real Patrimonio, Madrid, 1841
- Álbum de aves cubanas, París, 1842
- Informe sobre el estado actual de la industria belga con aplicación a España, Madrid, 1842
- La industria algodonera y los obreros en Cataluña, Madrid, 1842
- Reflexiones sobre la industria española, Madrid, 1842
- Mapa geográfico de la Isla de Cuba, 1842
- Carta a Don Carlos Groizard, s.a.
- Análisis del censo de la población de la Isla de Cuba en 1841, id. 1843
- Atlas carcelario, id. 1843
- Discurso... para la mejora del sistema carcelario, correccional y penal de España, Barcelona, 1843?
- Informe sobre el estado de la industria fabril en Alemania, Madrid, 1843
- La reforma de la Constitución de 1837, innecesaria, inoportuna y peligrosa, Madrid, 1844
- Estudios estadísticos sobre Madrid, Madrid, 1844
- Industria algodonera, Madrid, 1844
- Notas de viaje escritas durante una corta excursión a Francia, Bélgica y Alemania en el otoño de 1843, Madrid, 1844
- Revista de los intereses materiales y morales. Periódico de doctrinas progresivas en favor la Humanidad, id. id, dos tomos
- Relación de los viajes hechos en Europa bajo el punto de vista de la instrucción y beneficencia pública, la represión, el castigo y la reforma de los delincuentes, los progresos agrícolas e industriales y su influencia en la moralidad, id. íd.
- Noticia sobre el estado actual de la Economía política en España, id, id.
- Estudios coloniales con aplicación a la Isla de Cuba (De los efectos de la supresión en el tráfico negrero), id. 1845.
- Empresa del Canal Dalias.. entre Adra y Almería, id. id.
- Carta a M. Blanqui, id. id.
- Informe sobre el cultivo de la caña y fabricación del azúcar en las costas de Andalucía, id. id.
- El Azucarero. Periódico industrial, Madrid-Málaga, noviembre de 1846 a marzo de 1847
- Sur l’inexactitude des principes economiques... dans les colleges, París, 1848
- Le probléme de l’organisation du Travail devant le Congrés des Economistes de Bruxelles, id. id.
- Aforismos sociales, Madrid, 1848
- Mon contingent á l’Academie, Paris, 1849
- Utopie de la Paix, id. id.
- Apuntes para una Biblioteca de escritores económicos españoles, Madrid, 1849
- Mis debates contra la anarquía de la época y en favor del orden social racional, id. id.
- Révolution économique, causes et moyens, París, 1849
- Sur les conditions de l’ordre et des reformes sociales, París, 1849
- Notas para la historia de la prostitución en España, Madrid, 1850
- Sur les produits espagnoles envoyés á l’exposition de Londres, London, 1851
- Memoria sobre los objetos estudiados en la Exposición Universal de Londres, London, 1853
- El problema de los bosques bajo el doble punto de vista, físico y social, London, 1854
- Catálogo de escritores económicos españoles, London, 1855
- Vindicación de una apreciación injusta de un proyecto de ley, id. id.
- Remedio contra los efectos funestos de las crisis políticas y de las paralizaciones comerciales, id. íd.
- Relación de los trabajos físicos y meteorológicos hechos por Don Andrés Poey, París, 1858
- Artículos varios sobre las malas doctrinas, comunicadas a la verdad católica, La Habana, 1859
- Le mal et le remède, París, 1859
- El guano del Perú, La Habana, 1860
- Noción del poder, Madrid, 1861
- Lettres á M. Sainte-Beuve au sujet de ses idées philosophiques, París, 1867
- L’Ame. Démonstration de la realité deduite de l’etude des effets du chioroforme et du curare sur l’economie animale, París, 1868
- Les partis d'Espagne, París, s. a.
