= Gyalecta ancistrospora =

Scientific classification
- Domain: Eukaryota
- Kingdom: Fungi
- Division: Ascomycota
- Class: Lecanoromycetes
- Order: Gyalectales
- Family: Gyalectaceae
- Genus: Gyalecta
- Species: G. ancistrospora

Binomial name
- Gyalecta ancistrospora Aptroot & K.H.Moon (2014)

Species of lichen

Gyalecta ancistrospora is a species of saxicolous (rock-dwelling), crustose lichen in the family Gyalectaceae. Found in Korea, it was formally described as a new species in 2014 by lichenologists André Aptroot and Kwang-Hee Moon. The type specimen was collected by the first author from Mount Juwang (Cheongsong County, North Gyeongsang Province) at an altitude between 330 and 520 m (1,080 and 1,710 ft); there, it was found growing on siliceous rock. It is only known to occur in this area, where it grows on boulders shaded by trees in forest.

== Description ==
The lichen has a thin, pale greenish-grey, crust-like thallus that covers areas of up to about 5 cm (2 in). The photobiont partner is trebouxioid (spherical, unicellular green algae). The ascomata are sessile, and measure 0.3–0.6 mm in diameter; they have a flat, dull orange disc with a pale pinkish-orange margin. All chemical spot tests are negative, and no lichen products were detected using thin-layer chromatography. The main characteristic that distinguishes Gyalecta ancistrospora from other Gyalecta species is the presence of spindle-shaped (fusiform) ascospores that have a long attenuated tail at the lower end. The spores, which have three septa that divide it into four chambers, measure 30–41 by 3.5–4 μm. The lichen is otherwise similar in appearance to other saxicolous members of its genus, particularly G. jenensis and G. ulleungdoensis.
