= Ramonia vermispora =

Scientific classification
- Kingdom: Fungi
- Division: Ascomycota
- Class: Lecanoromycetes
- Order: Gyalectales
- Family: Gyalectaceae
- Genus: Ramonia
- Species: R. vermispora

Binomial name
- Ramonia vermispora Lendemer & K.Knudsen (2008)

Species of lichen

Ramonia vermispora is a species of saxicolous (rock-dwelling) and crustose lichen in the family Gyalectaceae. Found in the Sonoran Desert region of the southwestern United States, it was formally described as a new species in 2008 by lichenologists James Lendemer and Karry Knudsen. The type specimen was collected in San Bernardino National Forest (Riverside County, California), at an elevation of 1,655 m (5,430 ft); here it was found growing on granitic rock in a shaded rocky outcrop in a woodland. The lichen is only known to occur at the type locality, which is part of the San Jacinto Mountains. The specific epithet vermispora alludes to the "worm-like appearance of the ascospores". Similar species include R. ablephora and R. gyalectiformis, both of which can be distinguished from R. vermispora by ascospore morphology.
