= Neopetractis =

Scientific classification
- Kingdom: Fungi
- Division: Ascomycota
- Class: Lecanoromycetes
- Order: Gyalectales
- Family: Gyalectaceae
- Genus: Neopetractis; Ertz (2021)

Type species
- Neopetractis luetkemuelleri (Zahlbr.) Ertz (2021)

Species
- N. luetkemuelleri N. nodispora

Genus of lichens

Neopetractis is a small genus of rock-dwelling, crustose lichens in the family Gyalectaceae. It was established in 2021 to accommodate two species formerly assigned to Petractis, on the basis of molecular data and photobiont differences.

== Taxonomy ==
Neopetractis was circumscribed by Damien Ertz as a segregate of Petractis. It differs from Petractis in the strict sense (whose type species associates with a cyanobacterium) in having a trentepohlioid green-algal partner, and it also differs from Gyalecta sensu lato in having ascospores surrounded by a thick gelatinous sheath. The new combinations Neopetractis luetkemuelleri and N. nodispora were made in the protologue. In multi-locus phylogenies, Neopetractis forms a lineage close to Ramonia and the taxon often cited as "Gyalidea praetermissa"; deeper family-level relationships are unresolved and the broader family Gyalectaceae may not be monophyletic in those analyses.

== Description ==
The thallus of Neopetractis forms a thin crust on rock, either endolithic (inside the rock) or semi-epilithic (partly on the surface). It is continuous, smooth to finely wrinkled, whitish grey to pale pink, and lacks a distinct cortex. The photobiont is trentepohlioid, i.e. a filamentous green alga. Apothecia (sexual fruiting bodies) are at first immersed and perithecioid (flask-like), later opening to expose a small disc up to about 0.5 mm across with a slightly raised, often paler margin; the disc is beige-pink to pale brown and flat to shallowly concave. The exciple is thin and pale; the hymenium is colourless and stains I− or faintly I+, KI+ blue. Asci are 8-spored and the paraphyses are simple. Ascospores are hyaline, ellipsoid, 3–5-septate to submuriform (occasionally with longitudinal septa). They have dimensions of roughly 16–25 × 5.5–10 μm, and are each surrounded by a distinct gelatinous sheath about 2–4 μm thick. Pycnidia are immersed in the thallus; conidia are colourless and either simple or forming irregular multicellular clusters. No lichen substances were detected by thin-layer chromatography.

== Habitat and distribution ==
Species of Neopetractis occur on calcareous rocks. The type of N. luetkemuelleri was collected on limestone on the island of Hvar (Croatia), while the type of N. nodispora is from a northwest-facing limestone wall in Glamorgan, Wales.
