= Gyalecta kibiensis =

Scientific classification
- Kingdom: Fungi
- Division: Ascomycota
- Class: Lecanoromycetes
- Order: Gyalectales
- Family: Gyalectaceae
- Genus: Gyalecta
- Species: G. kibiensis

Binomial name
- Gyalecta kibiensis H.Harada & Yoshim. (2005)

Species of lichen

Gyalecta kibiensis is a species of saxicolous (rock-dwelling), crustose lichen in the family Gyalectaceae. Found in Japan, it was formally described as a new species in 2005 by Hiroshi Harada and Isao Yoshimura. The type specimen was collected from limestone in Iwatutsudani (Takahashi, Okayama). The thallus of the lichen is smooth and has a light greyish-green colour. A year later it was recorded growing on a limestone outcrop on the banks of the Takano River, in Ehime Prefecture.
