= Gyalecta perithecioidea =

Scientific classification
- Domain: Eukaryota
- Kingdom: Fungi
- Division: Ascomycota
- Class: Lecanoromycetes
- Order: Gyalectales
- Family: Gyalectaceae
- Genus: Gyalecta
- Species: G. perithecioidea

Binomial name
- Gyalecta perithecioidea Aptroot (2020)

Species of lichen

Gyalecta perithecioidea is a little-known species of saxicolous (rock-dwelling), crustose lichen in the family Gyalectaceae. It is found in Brazil, where it grows on sheltered limestone in the Atlantic Forest.

== Taxonomy ==
The lichen was described as a new species in 2020 by Dutch lichenologist André Aptroot. The type specimen was collected by the author from the Serra da Bodoquena (Mato Grosso do Sul at an elevation of 500 m (1,600 ft). The species epithet refers to its characteristic perithecioid ascomata.

== Description ==
The thallus of Gyalecta perithecioidea is crustose, with a dull, pale pinkish-green to pale orange colour, and lacks a prothallus. The photobiont is trentepohlioid green algae. The ascomata are perithecia, located in cavities in the thallus and emerging from the substratum. They are spherical, pale ochraceous to pale orange, and measure 0.3 to 0.4 mm in diameter. The wall is pale and lacks periphyses, while the ostiole is orangish and darker than the ascoma wall. The hamathecium comprises unbranched paraphyses filled with yellow oil, which is a rare character in lichens. Ascospores are hyaline, numbering eight per ascus, and they are densely irregularly muriform, with only the median septum horizontal. The spores are ellipsoid, measuring 22 to 27 μm by 15 to 16 μm. Pycnidia have not been observed in this species.
