= Anolis mestrei =

Conservation status
- Least Concern (IUCN 3.1)

Scientific classification
- Kingdom: Animalia
- Phylum: Chordata
- Class: Reptilia
- Order: Squamata
- Suborder: Iguania
- Family: Anolidae
- Genus: Anolis
- Species: A. mestrei

Binomial name
- Anolis mestrei Barbour & Ramsden, 1916

Synonyms
- Anolis allogus mestrei Barbour & Ramsden, 1916; Anolis cubanus Ahl, 1925

Species of lizard

Anolis mestrei, commonly known as the Pinar del Rio anole and the red-fanned rock anole, is a species of lizard in the family Dactyloidae. The species is endemic to Cuba.

== Etymology ==
The specific name, mestrei, is in honor of Aristides Mestre y Hevia (1865–1952), who was a Cuban physician and naturalist.

== Geographic distribution ==
Anolis metrei is found in the Cuban provinces of La Habana and Pinar del Río.

== Habitat ==
The preferred natural habitat of Anolis mestrei is forest.

== Behavior ==
Anolis mestrei is terrestrial and saxicolous (rock-dwelling).

== Reproduction ==
Anolis mestrei is oviparous.

== Taxonomy ==
Anolis mestrei belongs to the Anolis sagrei species group.
