= Semigyalecta =

Scientific classification
- Domain: Eukaryota
- Kingdom: Fungi
- Division: Ascomycota
- Class: Lecanoromycetes
- Order: Gyalectales
- Family: Gyalectaceae
- Genus: Semigyalecta; Vain. (1921)

Type species
- Semigyalecta paradoxa Vain. (1921)

Genus of fungi

Semigyalecta is a genus of lichenized fungi in the family Gyalectaceae. It is a monotypic genus, containing the single species Semigyalecta paradoxa, described as new to science in 1921 by Finnish lichenologist Edvard August Vainio.
