= Mariefred =

Place in Södermanland, Sweden

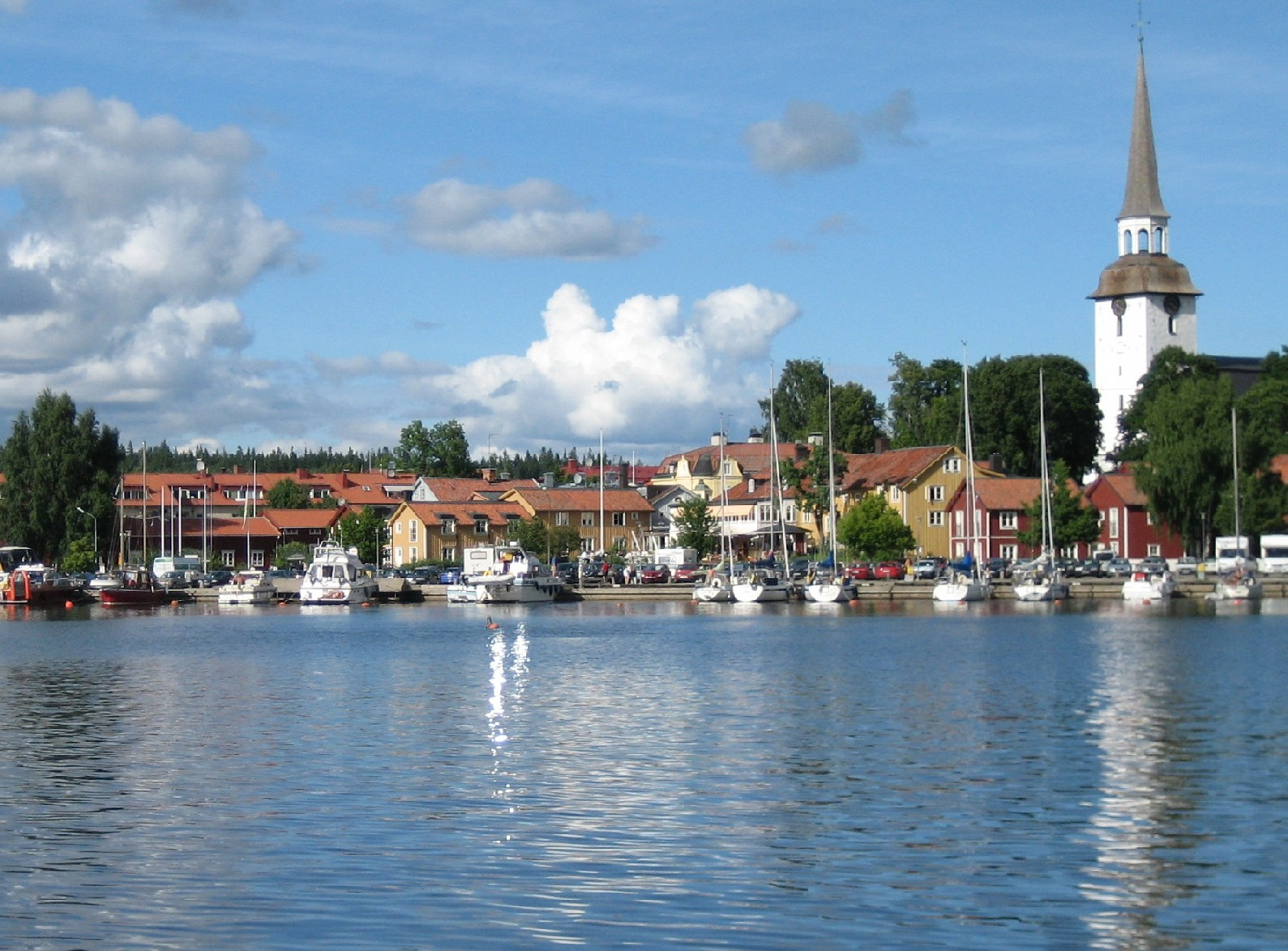
- Mariefred in August 2005 as seen from Gripsholm Castle

- Flag Coat of arms

- Location within Södermanland Location within Sweden
- Coordinates: 59°16′N 17°13′E
- Country: Sweden
- Province: Södermanland
- County: Södermanland County
- Municipality: Strängnäs Municipality

Area
  - Total: 2.51 km^{2} (0.97 sq mi)

Population (31 December 2020)
  - Total: 7,121
  - Density: 2,840/km^{2} (7,350/sq mi)
- Time zone: UTC+1 (CET)
  - Summer (DST): UTC+2 (CEST)

Mariefred is a locality situated in Strängnäs Municipality, Södermanland County, Sweden with 7,121 inhabitants in 2023.

The name is derived from that of the former Carthusian monastery in the city, Mariefred Charterhouse, and means "Peace of Mary" (the previous name being Gripsholm). It lies roughly 50 kilometres west of Stockholm by Lake Mälaren.

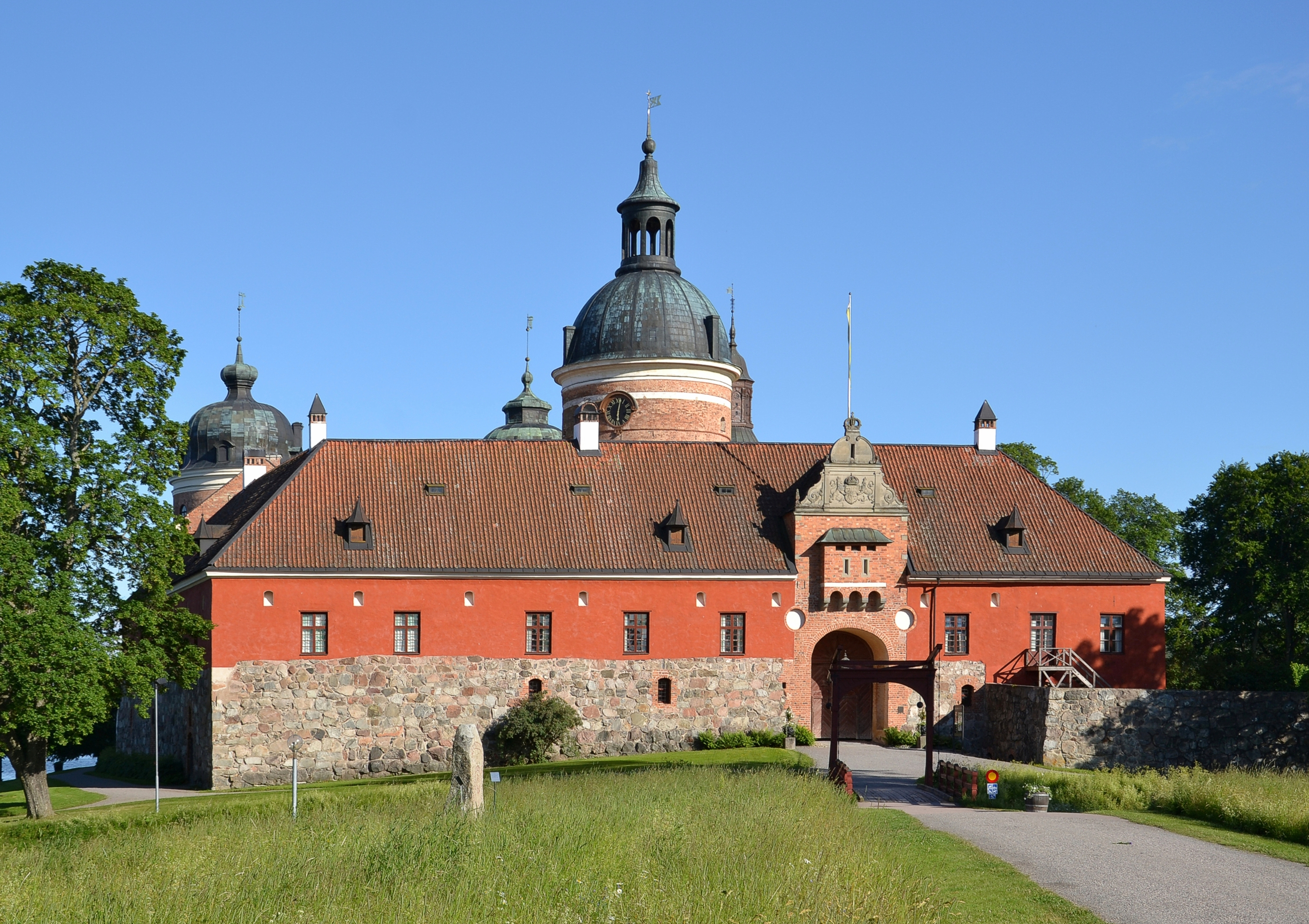
Gripsholm Castle

Despite its small population, Mariefred is, for historical reasons, often still referred to as a city. Statistics Sweden, however, only counts localities with more than 10,000 inhabitants as cities.

Gripsholm Castle is located in the town. Adjacent to the castle is the nature reserve and deer park Gripsholms hjorthage.

Gripsholms kungsladugård, an old barn of Gripsholm Castle, housed a centre for fine arts printmaking called Grafikens Hus, the largest of its kind in Sweden at the time, before being destroyed in a fire in 2014.

The East Södermanland Railway has a railway museum in the city with one of the finest collections of 600 mm narrow-gauge passenger railcars anywhere.

Kurt Tucholsky, a famous German author, is buried in the town cemetery.

== Notable natives ==
Swedish pop and jazz singer Lisa Ekdahl was raised in Mariefred.

Swedish actor Dolph Lundgren has a summer home in Mariefred, Kalkudden.

Mikael Samuelsson, a former professional ice hockey player in the NHL, was born in Mariefred. Samuelsson is a member of the exclusive Triple Gold Club, having won the Stanley Cup, Olympics, and World Championship.
