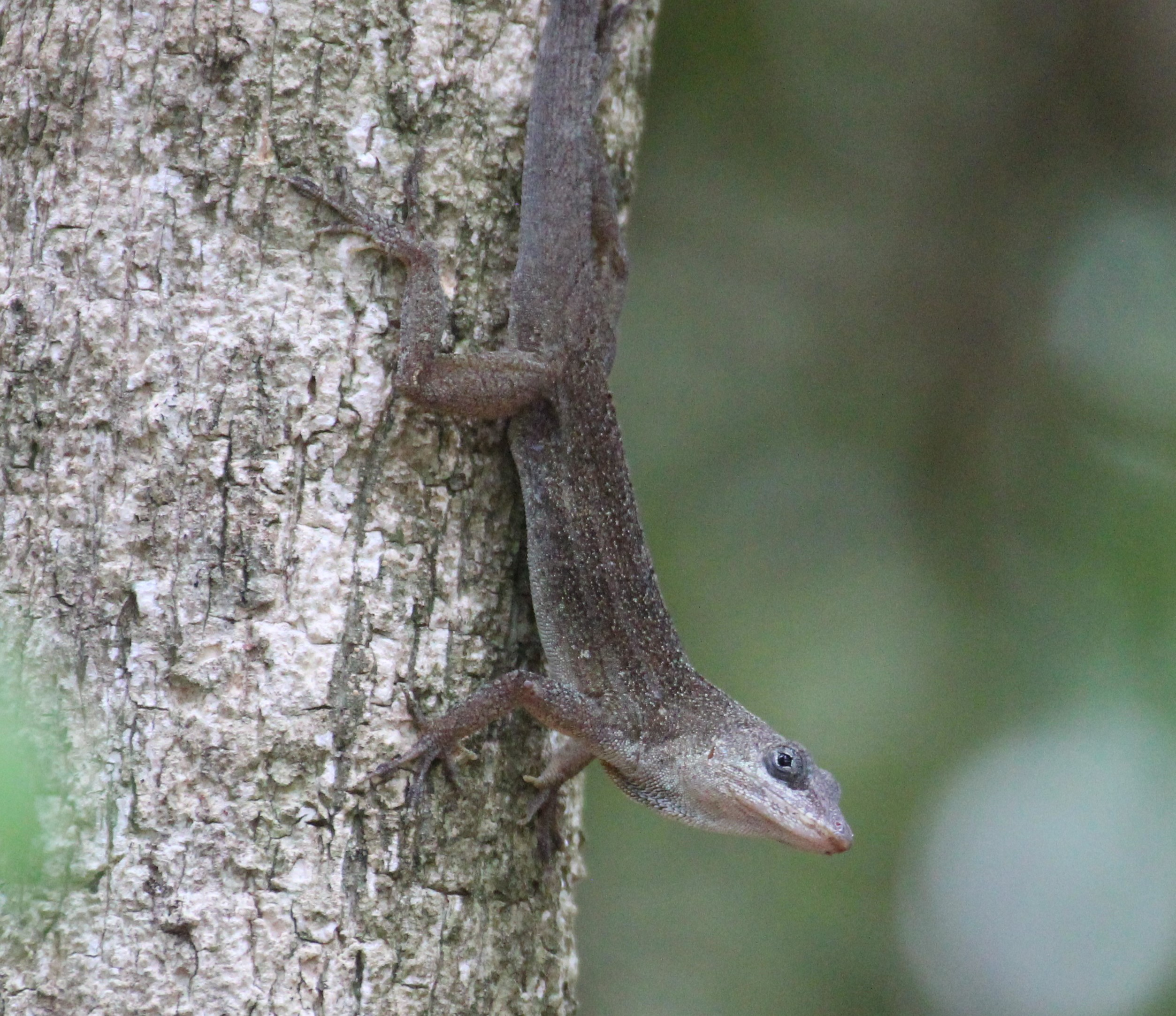

Conservation status
- Critically Endangered (IUCN 3.1)

Scientific classification
- Kingdom: Animalia
- Phylum: Chordata
- Class: Reptilia
- Order: Squamata
- Suborder: Iguania
- Family: Dactyloidae
- Genus: Anolis
- Species: A. nelsoni

Binomial name
- Anolis nelsoni Barbour, 1914

Synonyms
- Anolis sagrei nelsoni Barbour, 1914; Norops nelsoni (Brbour, 1914); Norops sagrei nelsoni (Barbour, 1914)

= Anolis nelsoni =

Species of lizard

Anolis nelsoni, also known commonly as Nelson's anole and the Swan Islands anole, is a species of lizard in the family Dactyloidae. The species is endemic to the Swan Islands of Honduras.

== Etymology ==
The specific name, nelsoni, is in honor of American ornithologist Edward William Nelson.

== Habitat ==
The preferred natural habitat of Anolis nelsoni is forest, at elevations from sea level to 10 m (33 ft).

== Abundance ==
On a videography expedition carried out in May 2022 by biologists Daniel Germer, Estefanía Cálix and the physician Alfonso Auerbach, Anolis nelsoni was found to be an abundant species on Great Swan island. About one A. nelsoni was seen on every other tree and occasionally inside the infrastructure.

== Diet ==
Anolis nelsoni preys predominately upon ants, but also upon other insects, spiders, gastropods, and smaller individuals of its own species, and it also eats some plant matter.

== Reproduction ==
Anolis nelsoni is oviparous.

== Taxonomy ==
Anolis nelsoni is a member of the Anolis sagrei species group.
