= Francis Rose =

British botanist (1921–2006)

- Born: 29 September 1921; South London
- Died: 15 July 2006 (aged 84); Liss, Hampshire, England
- Education: Queen Mary College
- Known for: Author of Field Guides
- Awards: MBE
- Scientific career
- Fields: Botany
- Workplaces: Bedford College; King's College London
- Doctoral students: Brian J. Coppins
- Other notable students: David Bellamy
- Author abbrev. (botany): F.Rose

Francis Rose MBE (29 September 1921 – 15 July 2006) was an English field botanist and conservationist. He was an author, researcher and teacher. His ecological interests in Britain and Europe included bryophytes, fungi, lichens, higher plants, plant communities and woodlands.

Rose was born in south London. He studied natural sciences at Chelsea Polytechnic and Queen Mary College, University of London, graduating with a degree in botany. He obtained a PhD in 1953, studying the structure and ecology of British lowland bogs.

From 1949, he taught at Bedford College and other colleges in London. In 1964, he joined the geography department as Senior Lecturer in Biogeography at King's College London, becoming a Reader in 1975 until 1981.

He married in 1943 to Pauline and had a family of three sons and a daughter. Rose was awarded the MBE in 2000. He died at Liss in Hampshire.

The lichen genus Francisrosea was named in his honour in 2021.

== Books ==
- The Wild Flower Key — How to identify wild plants, trees and shrubs in Britain and Ireland, 1981. ISBN 0-723-22418-8 LCCN 81-163983 Revised by Clare O'Reilly, 2006. Frederick Warne. ISBN 0-7232-5175-4.
- Colour Identification Guide to the Grasses, Sedges, Rushes and Ferns of the British Isles and North Western Europe, 1989. Viking. ISBN 0-670-80688-9.
- The Flora of Hampshire, 1996. Co-authored with Richard Mabey, Lady Anne Brewis and Paul Bowman. Harley Books. ISBN 0-946589-34-8.
- Francis Rose and Pat Wolseley 1984 Nettlecombe Park: Its History and Its Epiphytic Lichens - An Attempt at Correlation Co-authored with Pat Wolseley. Academic Journal Offprint from The Journal of the Field Studies Council, Volume 6, No. 1, November 1984. 50 pp, 14 figs ISBN 978-1851531653
- The Observer's Book of Wild Flowers, 3rd edition, 1978, Frederick Warne & Co. Ltd ISBN 0-7232-1584-7 LCCN 78-322087
- Lichens as Pollution Monitors. Co-authored with David L. Hawksworth, 1976. Edward Arnold. ISBN 0-7131-2554-3 LCCN 77-366465
- The Observer's Book of Grasses Sedges and Rushes, 1974. Frederick Warne & Co. Ltd ISBN 0-7232-1533-2

For a full list of publications see Obituary in Watsonia.
