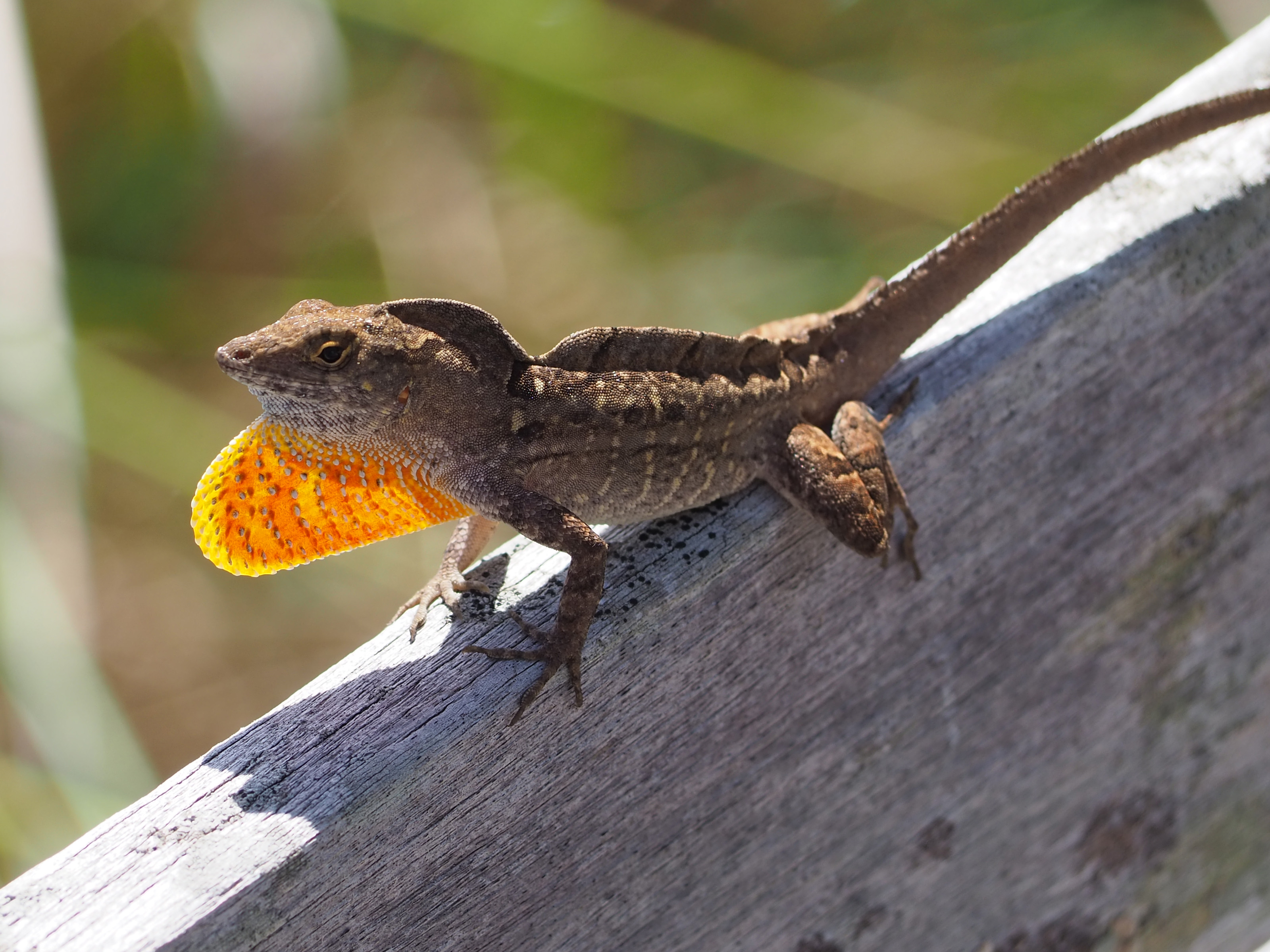
- Male displaying dewlap

Conservation status
- Least Concern (IUCN 3.1)

- Secure (NatureServe)

Scientific classification
- Kingdom: Animalia
- Phylum: Chordata
- Class: Reptilia
- Order: Squamata
- Suborder: Iguania
- Family: Anolidae
- Genus: Anolis
- Species: A. sagrei

Binomial name
- Anolis sagrei Duméril and Bibron, 1837

Synonyms
- Norops sagrei

= Brown anole =

Species of lizard

The brown anole (Anolis sagrei), also known commonly as the Bahaman anole, Cuban brown anole, and de la Sagra's anole, is a species of lizard in the family Anolidae. The species is native to Cuba, the Bahamas, Little Cayman, Cayman Brac, Jamaica, the Swan Islands, the Yucatán Peninsula, Belize, and the Caribbean coast of Guatemala and Honduras. It has been widely introduced elsewhere, via the importation and exportation of plants in pots in which brown anoles laid eggs in the soil, and is now found in Florida and other regions of the United States including southern Georgia, Texas, Louisiana, Tennessee, Mississippi, Alabama, Hawaii, North Carolina, and Southern California. It has also been introduced to other Caribbean islands, Mexico, Singapore, and Taiwan.

This species is highly invasive. It is also much more wary of humans than most other anole species. In its introduced range, it reaches exceptionally high population densities, is capable of expanding its range very quickly, and both outcompetes and consumes many species of native lizards, like the green anole. The brown anole's introduction into the United States in the early 1970s has altered the behavior and negatively affected populations of the native Carolina anole (Anolis carolinensis, also known as the green anole), which has since generally been relegated to the treetops.

== Etymology ==
The specific name, sagrei, is in honor of Spanish botanist Ramón de la Sagra.

== Description ==
The brown anole is normally a light brown color with darker brown to black markings on its back, and several tan to light color lines on its sides. Like other anoles, it can change color; individuals can change their general body coloration to shades of brown, black, or gray, and some display yellowish dots when excited. Color shifts can be rapid in response to threats.

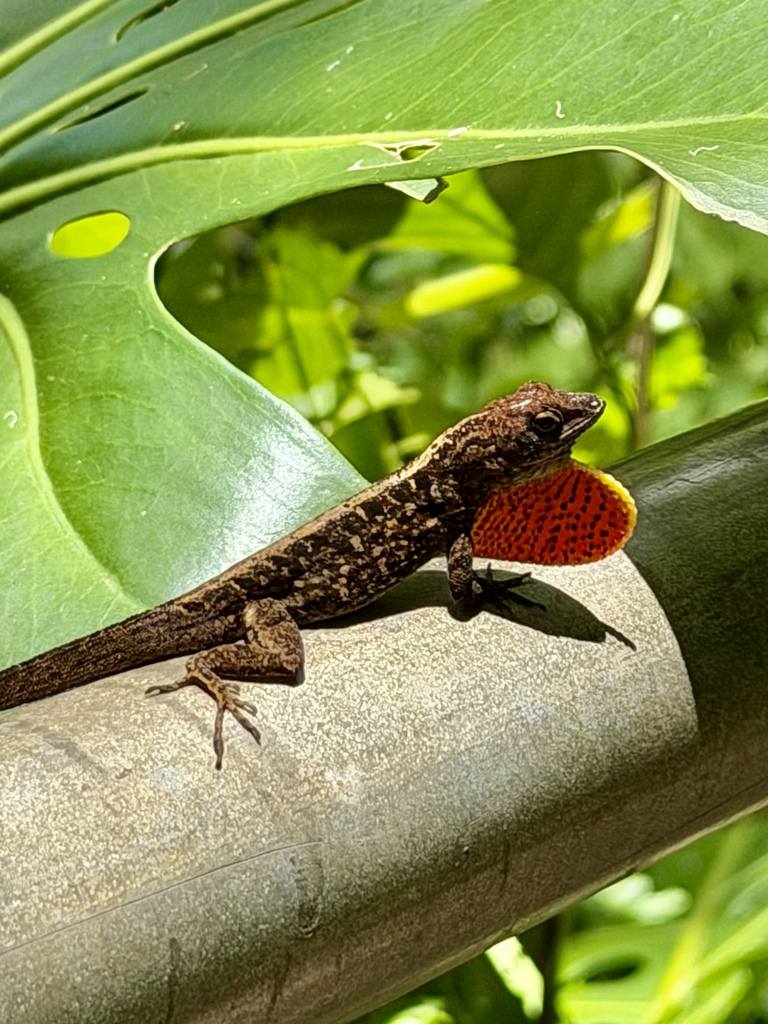
Its dewlap ranges from pale yellow to orange to deep red.

The brown anole usually has a total length (tail included) of 5.0–8.5 in (13–22 cm). Males can grow as large as their male Carolina anole counterparts, around 17.8–20.3 cm (7.0–8.0 in) long, with some individuals exceeding 22.9 cm (9.0 in). Females are also about the size of female Carolina anoles, which range from 7.6–15 cm (3.0–5.9 in). The male brown anole's head is smaller than that of the male Carolina anole.

The brown anole's tail has a ridge that continues to the head, a feature that the Carolina anole lacks. Female Anolis lizards exhibit heritable polymorphism in dorsal patterning. A study in Gainesville, Florida reported that one third of Anolis sagrei females displayed a male-like chevron dorsal pattern, while other females had a striped dorsal pattern with continuous variation.

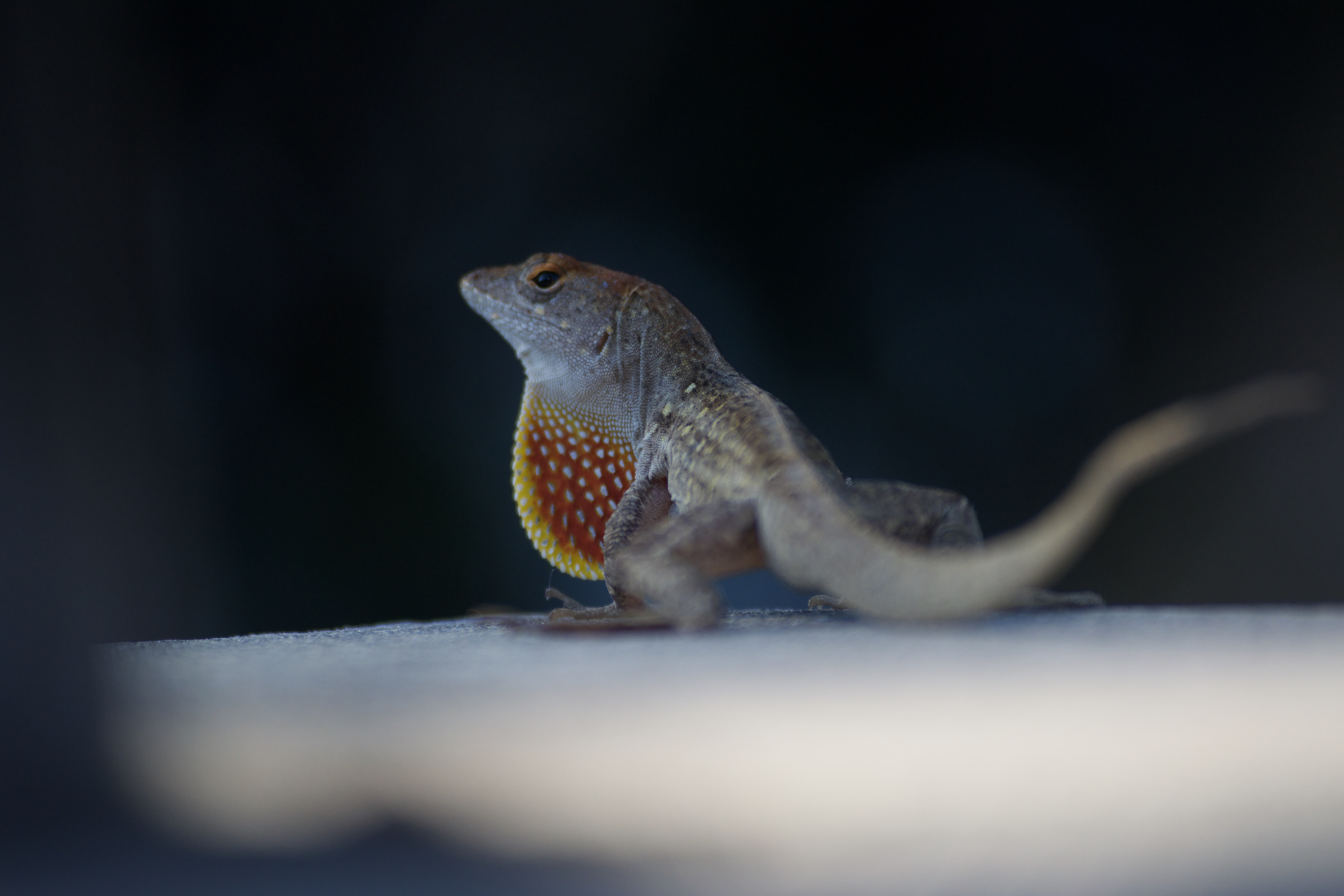
Male extending dewlap

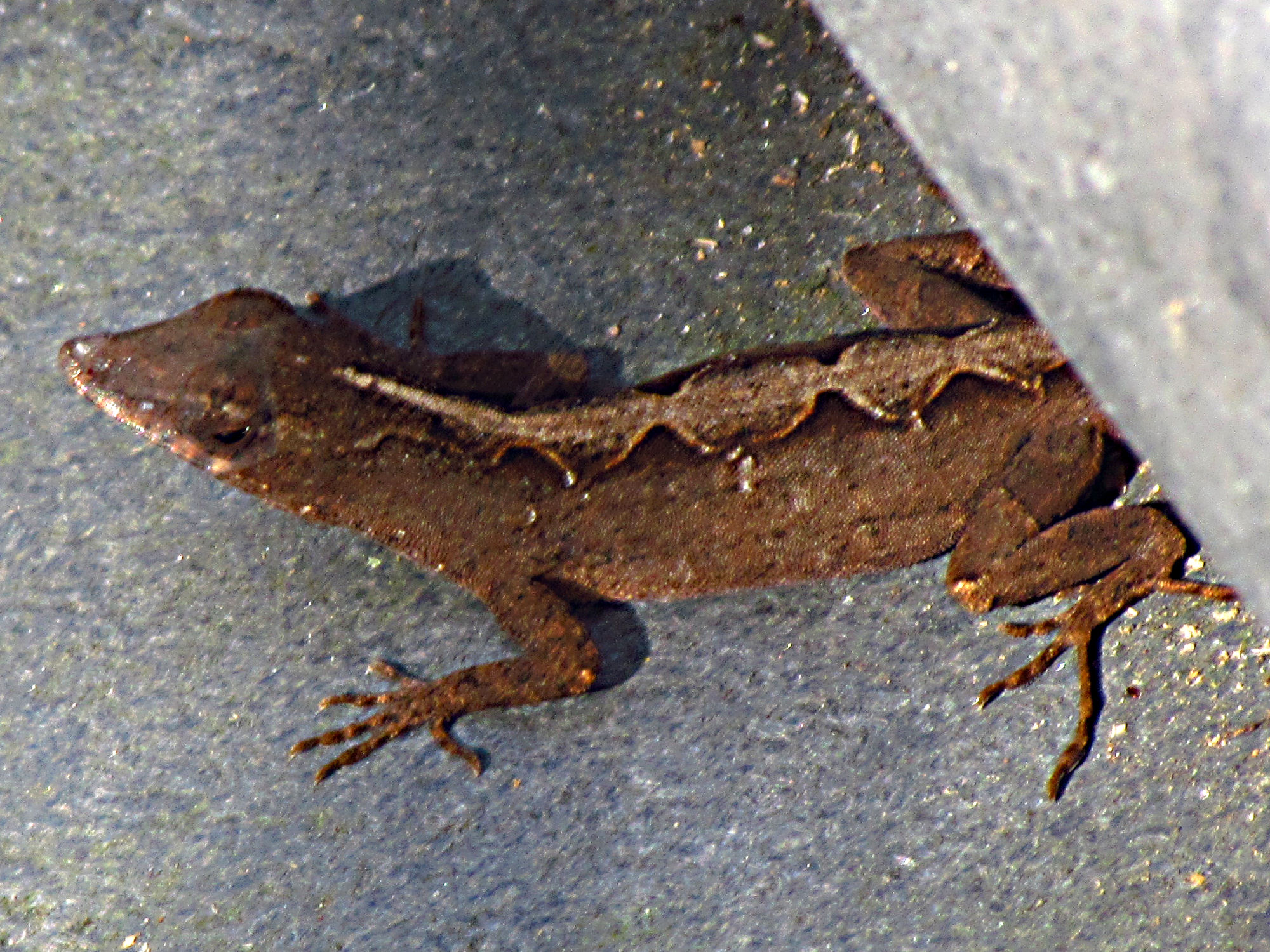
Florida female

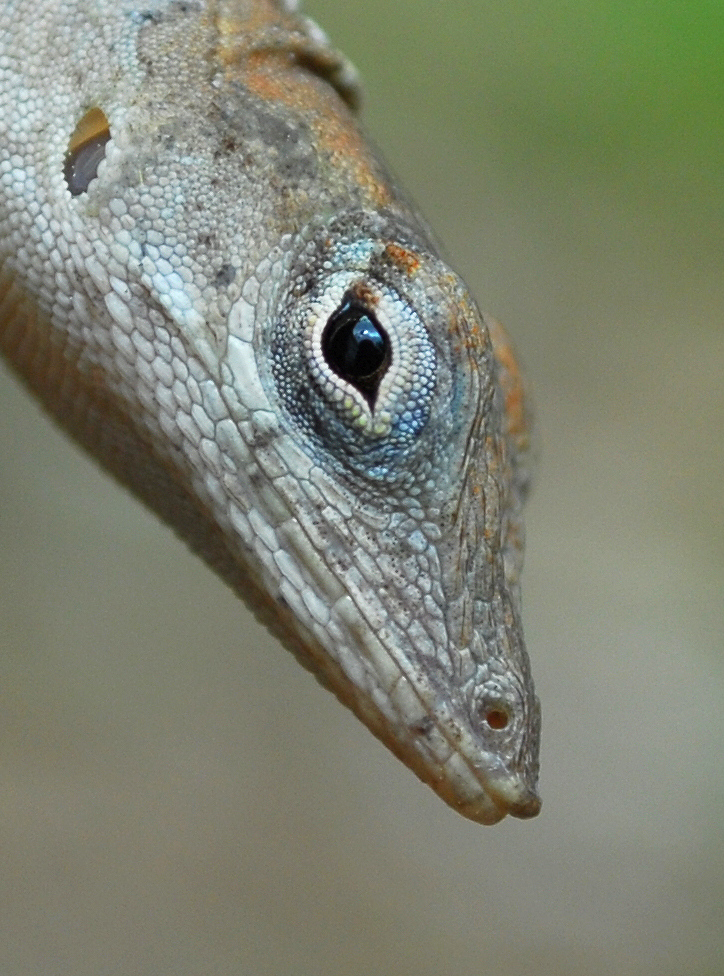
Female

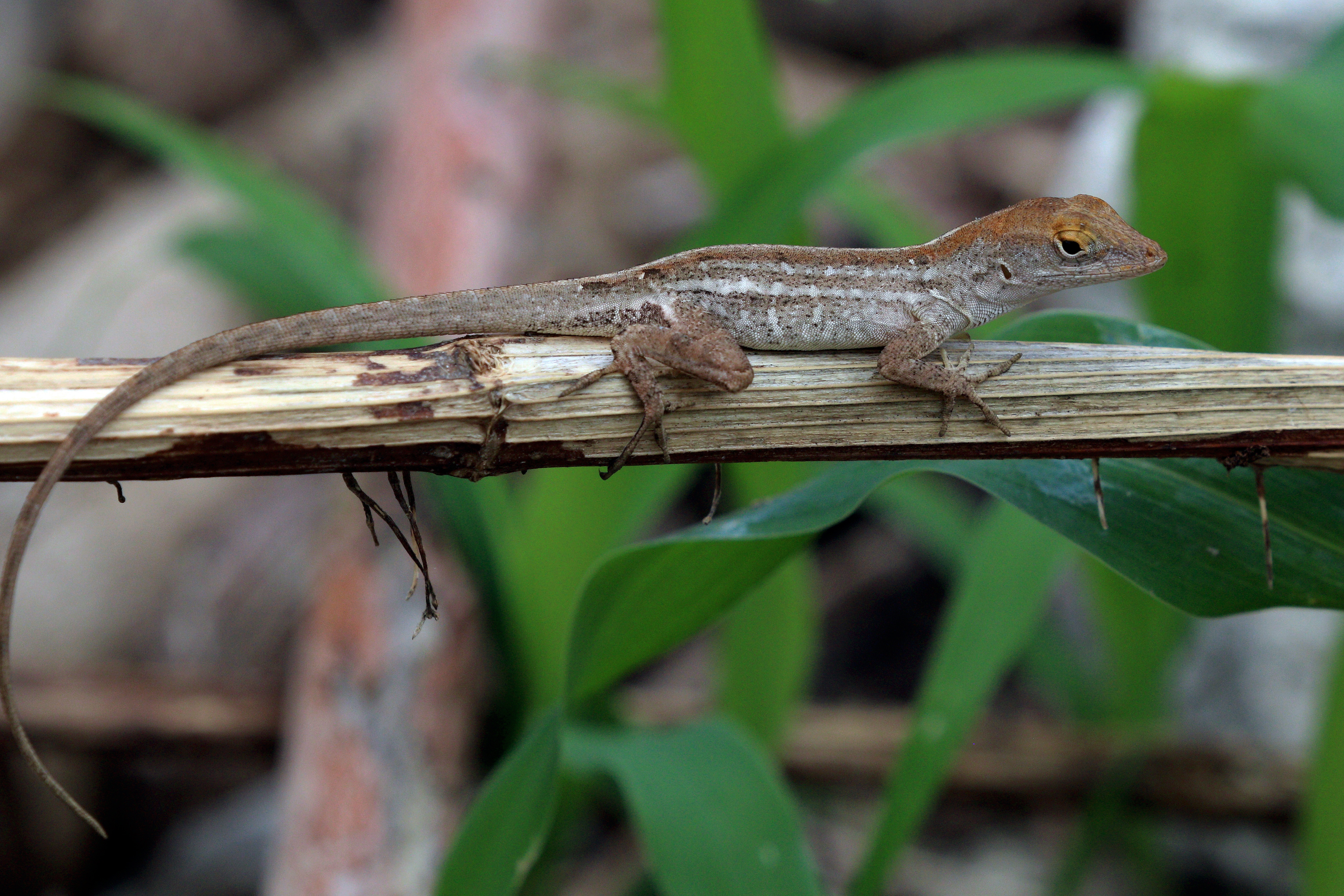
Grand Cayman juvenile

== Removal ==
In Taiwan, an investigation discovered that distribution of the foreign species Anolis sagrei was increasing, posing potential competitive crowding out effect towards the native species of lizards such as Diploderma swinhonis and Takydromus formosanus in Taiwan. Therefore, a monitoring removal plan was being carried out in 2009. The current removal methods include manual removal, improving the habitat, capturing with traps, biological control, and drug control. The most effective way of capturing A. sagrei is to capture with bare hands at night..

== Habitat and distribution ==
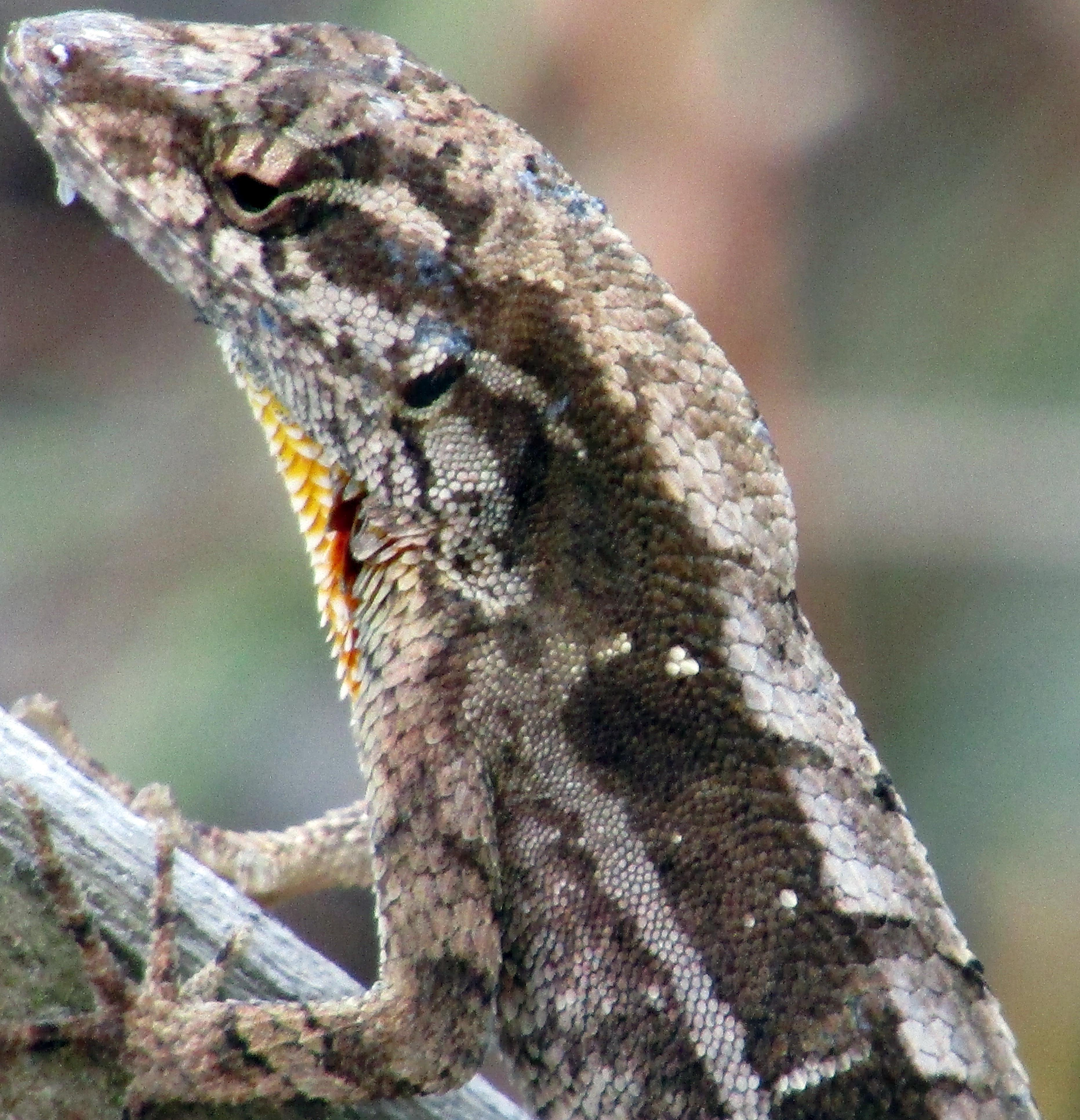
A Brown anole in central Honduras.

The native range of the brown anole extends over much of the Caribbean, including Jamaica, Cuba, the Cayman Islands, and other countries. It was considered an invasive species in parts of Florida in the United States, including the Florida Keys, Dade County, Broward County, and Palm Beach County as of 1985. As of 2021, its range had extended as far as Georgia and through Texas to parts of Mexico. It is believed that the brown anole was unintentionally brought to the area in cargo shipments for the Caribbean, as well as an intentional release of approximately 100 individuals in 1941. The species is also established in parts of Honduras.

The brown anole tends to live on the ground, avoiding trees and preferring to live in smaller plants and shrubs and is found in both urban and suburban areas. When the weather is warm, the brown anole can be found basking. When it is cold, it prefers sheltered areas. Juvenile brown anoles have been found to use perches closer to the ground when exhibiting high body temperatures, a behavior not seen in adults. The brown anole is less arboreal than the green anole which is frequently found living in trees, on the ground, or in low vegetation.

Although the brown anole was initially found in the Caribbean and then introduced to southern Florida, the species is now moving north. Specifically, the species has been found in southern Georgia as well as coastal Georgia. Researchers expect that this trend will continue in the coming years and that the brown anole will continue to migrate to other locations in the north. Due to its invasiveness, it is often the dominant reptile species in a given environment.

== Conservation ==
While the brown anole is an invasive species in the United States, it likely does provide some benefits to its ecosystems. Because it eats predominantly arthropods, it may keep populations of spiders at appropriate levels. Some research suggests that local spider populations depend directly on the population of the brown anole.

In habitats it shares with the green anole, the brown anole dominates and shrinks the population of the green anole. It also occasionally eats hatchlings of the green anole, further putting pressure on green anole populations. No concentrated efforts have been made to mitigate the spread of the brown anole populations in the United States.

Additionally, the brown anole has been shown to be responsible for the transmission of parasites among lizard populations in Hawaii, which are often deadly for these local populations.

== Phylogeny ==
The brown anole belongs to the family and genus, Anolidae and Anolis, respectively.

The most closely related species to Anolis sagrei is Anolis nelsoni, also called Nelson's anole.

The brown anole has a shorter snout length than the green anole. The green anole (Anolis carolinensis) is green or light brown patterned.

== Territoriality ==
=== Male-male competition ===
Studies suggest that male brown anoles exhibit territoriality over ground below perches on which they rest. When the male anole spots other males in his ground territory, he is very likely to put on displays to attempt to intimidate the competitor. If, however, the competitor presents himself on the same perch as the male or at roughly the same height, the male is much more likely to attack the competitor. So, the male brown anole is thought to use his perch to survey his territory, but is not likely to leave the perch to fight off competitors, as doing so would be costly. Additionally, research shows that the success of an individual male anole in competition with another is dependent on his size relative to his competitor. The size of a male also correlates with the height of his perch; that is, larger males are more often found on higher perches and smaller males on lower ones. Different specific confrontational behaviors are also exhibited by differently sized males; larger ones more often initiate conflict and smaller ones more often nod their heads towards larger anoles. The loss of a male brown anole's tail has been shown to have little to no effect on the size of the territory he protects or dominance patterns between male brown anoles.

=== Habitat migration ===
Under certain circumstances, brown anoles leave their current territory and migrate to a new one. Males migrate to new territories in response to male-male competition, with smaller males being more likely to migrate. The distance that a male migrates is negatively correlated with his size relative to other males; large males travel shorter distances to new territories and small males travel longer distances to new territories. Female brown anoles do not show an association between size and probability of migration or migration distance. Instead, females in territories with a high density of other females are more likely to move to territories with lower densities of other females. Generally, individuals, regardless of sex, prefer to remain in their original territory as migrating poses predation risks and energetic costs.

== Diet ==
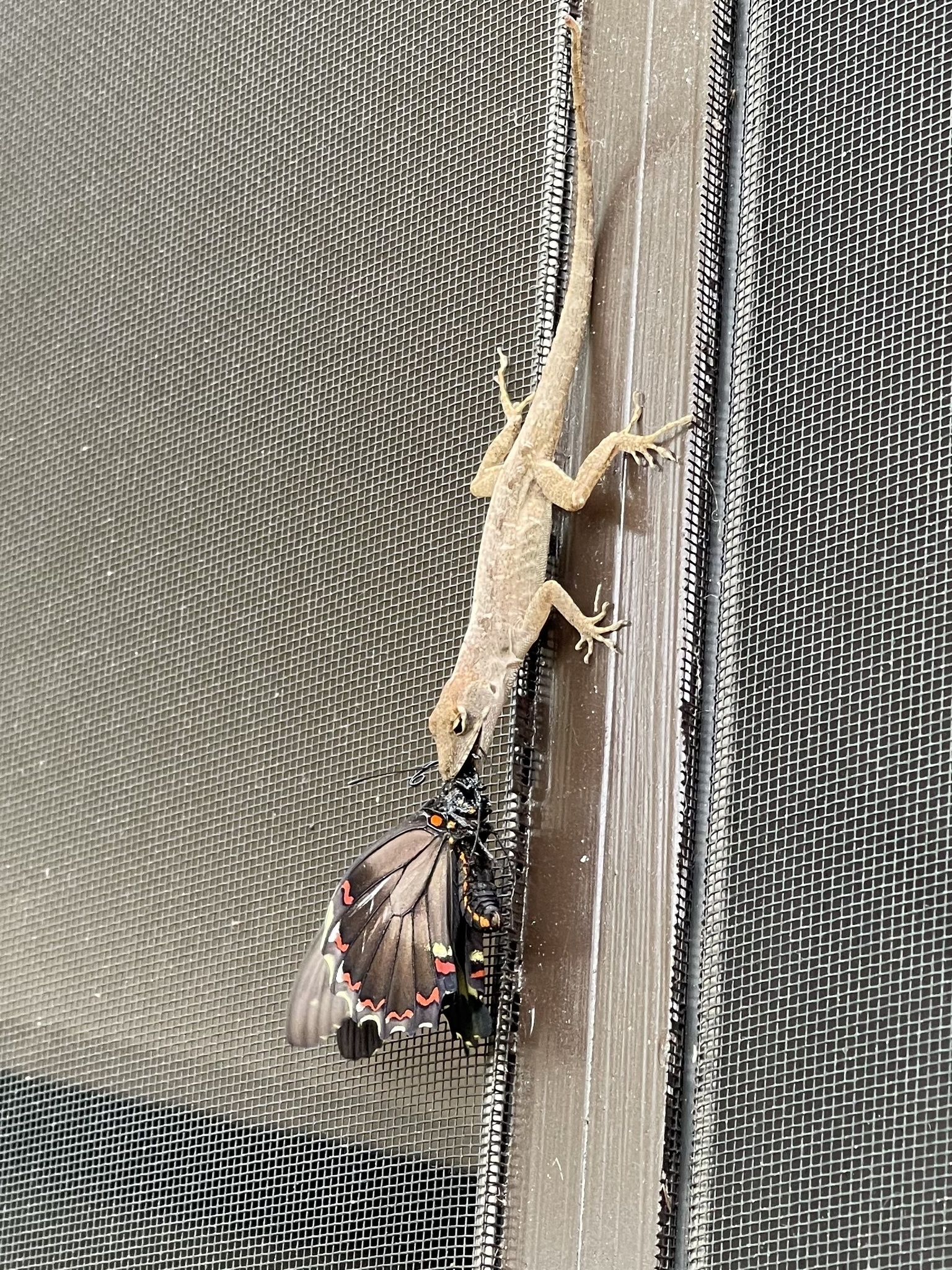
Eating a Polydamas swallowtail

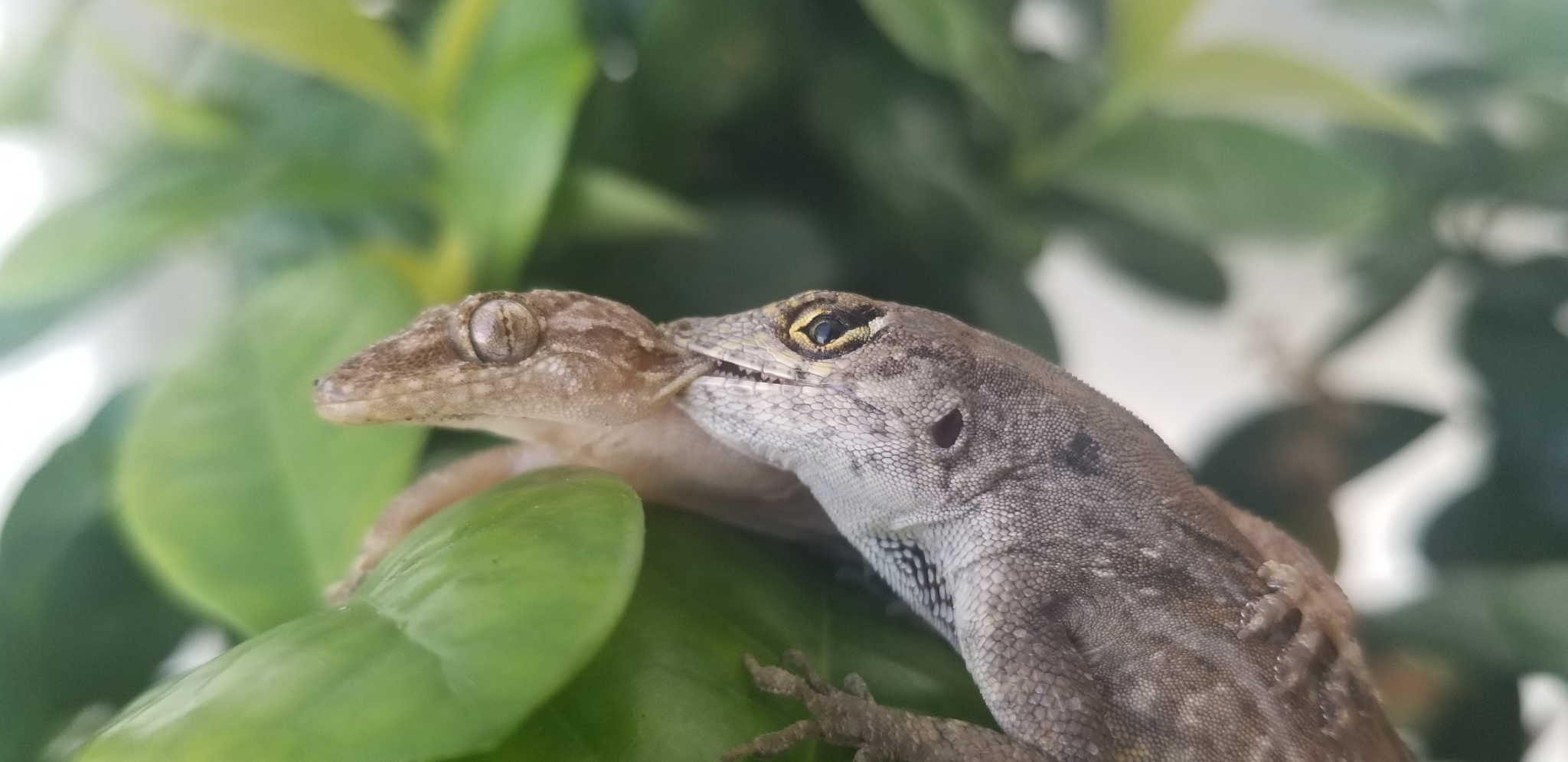
With a tropical house gecko, which was subsequently swallowed whole

The brown anole feeds on small arthropods such as crickets, moths, ants, grasshoppers, cockroaches, mealworms, beetles, flies, earwigs, butterflies, spiders, waxworms, amphipods, and isopods. The brown anole also feed on other types of invertebrates such as earthworms and snails. It may also eat other lizards, such as skinks, geckos, curly-tailed lizards, the Carolina anole, lizard eggs and hatchlings (including members of its species), and its own molted skin and detached tail. If near water, it eats aquatic arthropods or small fishes – nearly any prey that will fit in its mouth. Occasionally, individuals will also consume figs and plant material; it may be interpreted as a hydration mechanism or accidental ingestion.

== Reproduction ==
In a given habitat, female brown anoles reproduce in the warmer parts of the year. The brood size of a single female brown anole is one egg, which it lays in damp environments. The female lays its eggs roughly 2 weeks apart from each other, resulting in a total of 15 to 18 eggs in a single breeding season. The breeding season of a female extends slightly longer than that of a male, as the female is capable of storing sperm for a short time. When a juvenile anole is born, usually in June, it is completely independent from its parents. Sexual maturation of both males and females occurs within a year of hatching, so an individual can participate in the mating season following its birth.

When a female anole is prepared for mating, it begins by making itself visible to the male whose territory it is in. When mating occurs, the male grabs on to the back on the females neck with its mouth, so prior to mating, a female will bend its neck such that it is more visible and accessible by the male, indicating that it is ready for procreation. If the male decides to reproduce, it will begin mating with the female, which usually lasts from 30 to 60 minutes. Males indicate that they are available for mating by extending their dewlap and bobbing their head.

=== Mating ===
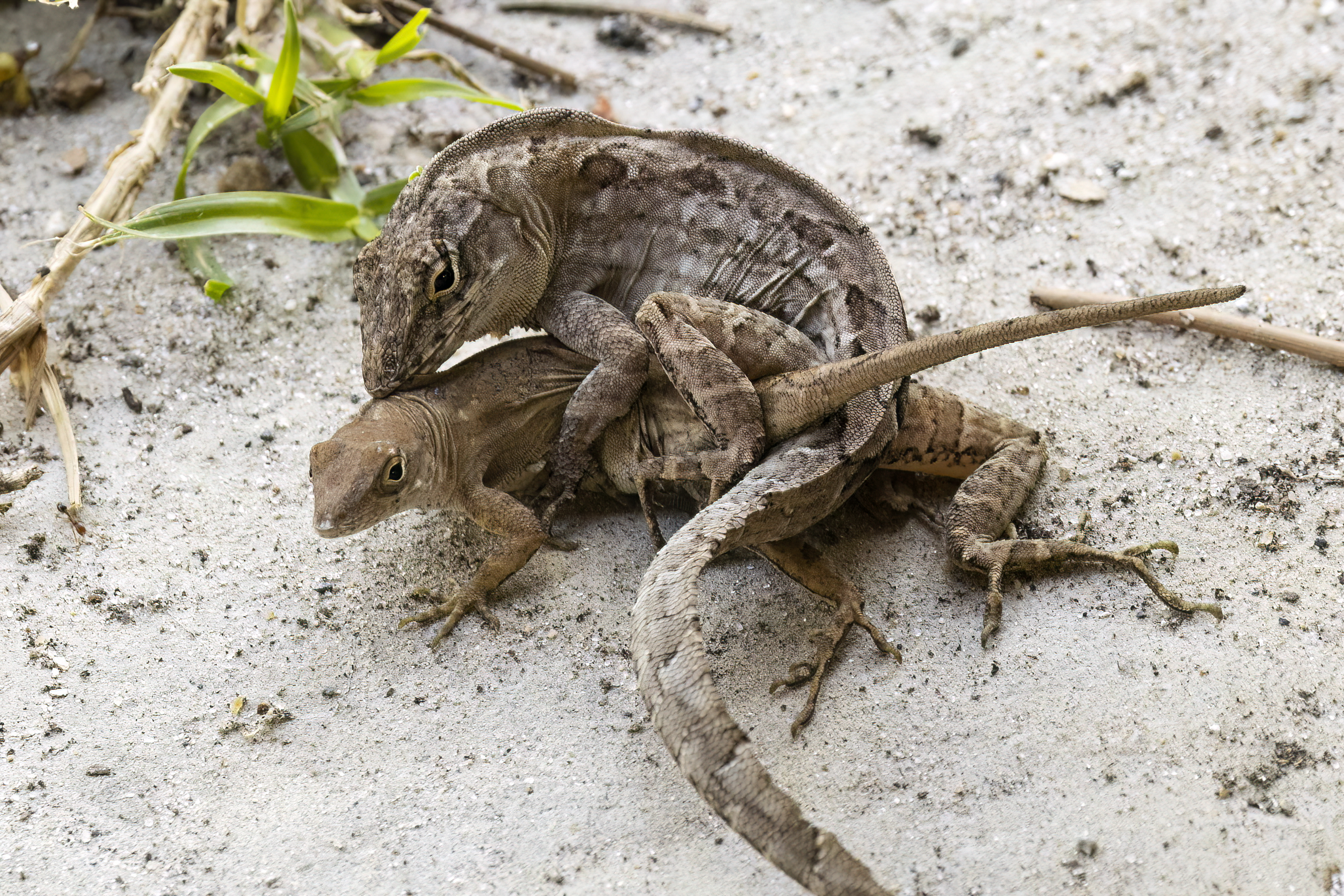
Mating pair of brown anoles

Male anoles have a flap that extends below their neck called a "dewlap". Dewlap extension occurs alongside a number of behaviors exhibited by the brown anole, namely during courtship. In an experiment by Richard Tokarz, an experimental group of male brown anoles underwent a surgery that rendered them unable to extend their dewlaps; a control group of male anoles were subject to the same surgery, but without the final step, so they retained the ability to extend their dewlap. Males and females were then put together in an enclosure; the experimental males took more time to begin mating when in the presence of females and mating took longer. Control males were more quick to begin mating and finished mating more quickly.

A separate study suggests that the dominant male in a territory is more influential over the mating partners of a female than female mate choice. During observation, females that mated with multiple males did so because dominance over a territory transferred between males, while the female remained in the same territory. There were no observations of female brown anoles seeking out different males or entering a new territory.

Additionally, female brown anoles are more likely to participate in mating behaviors in the presence of precipitation.

=== Parental care ===
An individual egg will hatch four weeks after it was laid. From the moment they are born, the anole is completely independent from its parents. As such, the brown anole displays no reproductive division of labor past the mating event and displays no cooperative brood care. However, female brown anoles have been observed digging holes and positioning eggs within these holes after oviposition. This is thought to allow for additional parental influence on phenotype and offspring survival. The selection of a site to nest by a female and how she lays her eggs within this site is performed in an effort to maximize survival of her offspring. A female will lay one egg at a time and can lay a new egg each week of the reproductive season.

== Predators ==
Known predators of the brown anole include broad-headed skinks, snakes, birds, and occasionally other species of anoles. More often than not, brown anoles eaten by other anoles are juvenile. Predation by many vertebrates has been observed. Spiders can prey upon young anoles and are one of the few exceptions to this observation.

=== Antipredator behavior ===
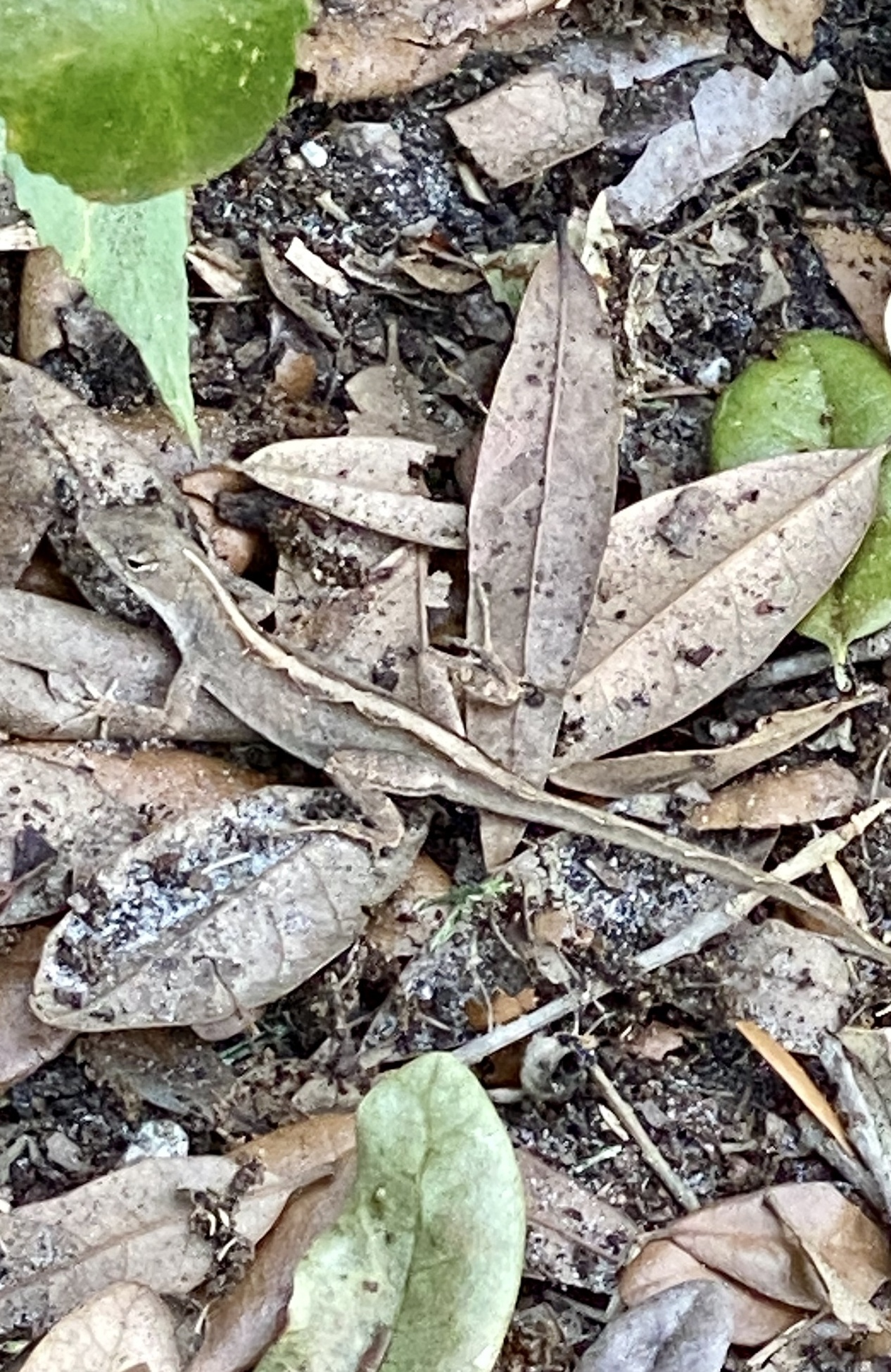
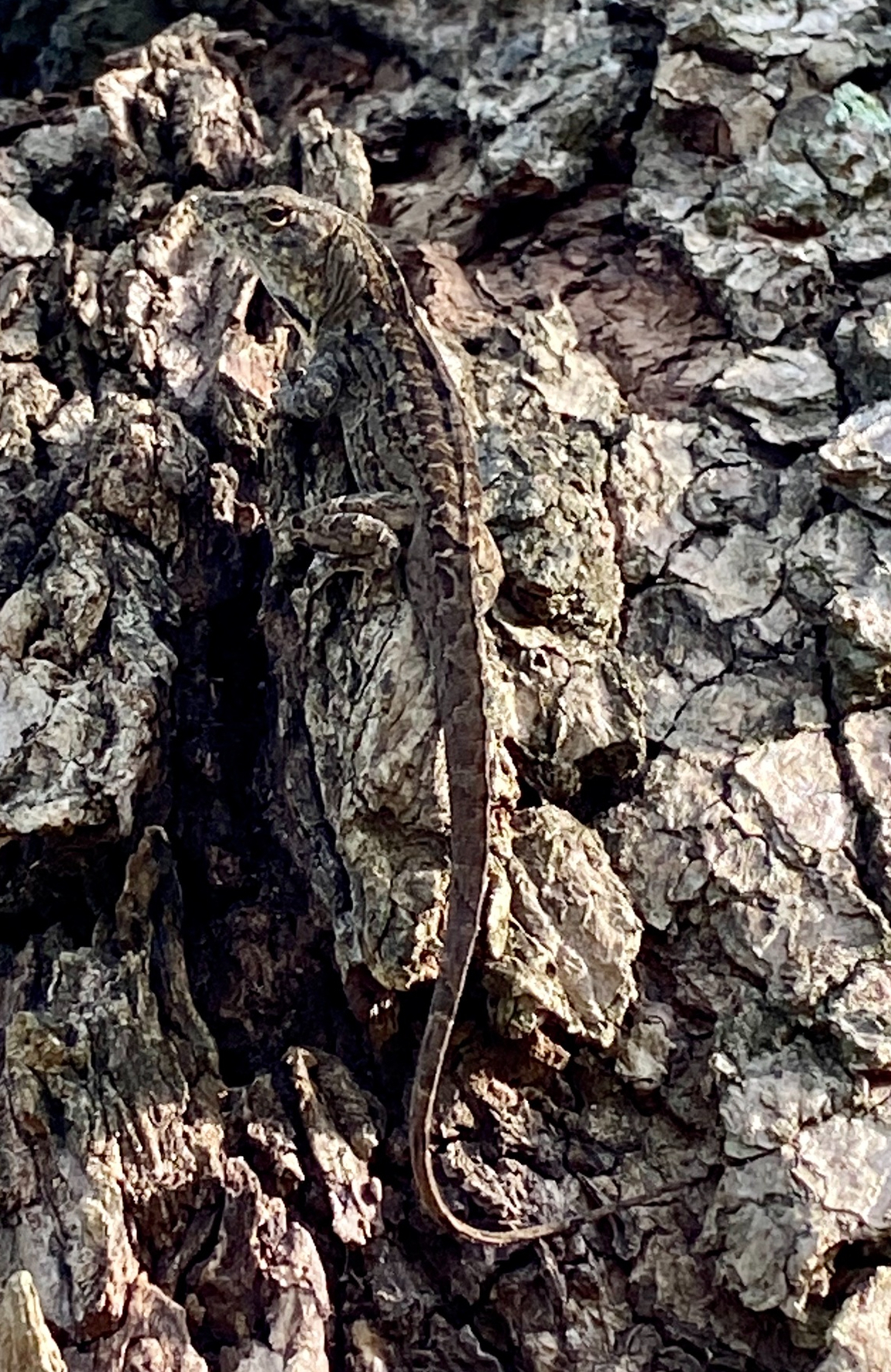
Two examples of Brown Anole camouflage

The coloration of the brown anole allows it to easily blend in with its surroundings, making it difficult for predators to spot. The brown anole has a detachable tail that can be detached if the anole is grabbed by the tail by a predator or used as a distraction, as it twitches after detaching. The tail grows back afterwards, albeit smaller and a duller color. Despite the extensive list of predators, the lizard's alertness and sprint speed make it very difficult for predators to track and capture.

== Physiology ==
=== Hindlimb length ===
When raised in terraria with surfaces differing in width (wide or narrow), brown anoles wide-surface terraria grew longer hindlimb than their narrow-surface terraria counterparts. Brown anoles demonstrate phenotypic plasticity in this trait, akin to very rapid evolution.

=== Toepads ===
Extreme climate events such as hurricanes can provoke species changes through natural selection. In areas recently affected by hurricanes, anoles with large, strong-gripping toepads were more successful in surviving. In 12 insular populations of Anolis sagrei, and 188 species from across the Neotropics over the past 70 years, the populations that were more frequently affected by hurricanes had proportionately larger toepads.

=== Dewlap ===
Nearly all species of anole, including the Anolis sagrei, have a dewlap on their throat. The dewlap can be used as a means of identifying specific species within the Dactyloidae family. This is useful for not only mate selection between male anoles, but also to ensure the female is indeed mating with an individual within their own species. The dewlap of the Anolis sagrei is typically a shade of red or yellow, while the rest of an individual is brown. The extension of the dewlap is controlled by the ceratobranchials II, a bone below the throat. The size and color of a species' dewlap has been shown to vary with the light of their environments and color of their body, respectively; specifically, dimmer environments elicit larger dewlaps and duller body colors elicit brighter dewlap colors. In the brown anole, dewlap color is not dependent on an individual's consumption of lutein and zeaxanthin, pigments typically used as colorants in species that display color on their body. Dewlaps are believed to be involved in mate selection, as well as communication between individual brown anoles.

=== Lead Resistance ===
As of late 2025, the Smithsonian finds that the Brown Anoles in New Orleans, Louisiana had an unusually high tolerance to lead in their blood. researchers found that even with the high levels of lead in their blood system, that the lizards showed no significant decrease in, balance, speed, and endurance, despite the amount of lead present. Biologists believe that the lizards have developed this high tolerance because of the presence of gasoline, paint, and other lead filled items in the soil.

== Shedding ==
Brown anoles molt in small pieces, unlike some other reptiles, which molt in one large piece. Anoles may consume the molted skin to replenish supplies of calcium. In captivity, the molted skin may stick to the anole if humidity is too low. The unshed layer of skin can build up around the eyes, preventing the lizard from feeding and may lead to starvation. This can be prevented by maintaining high humidity.

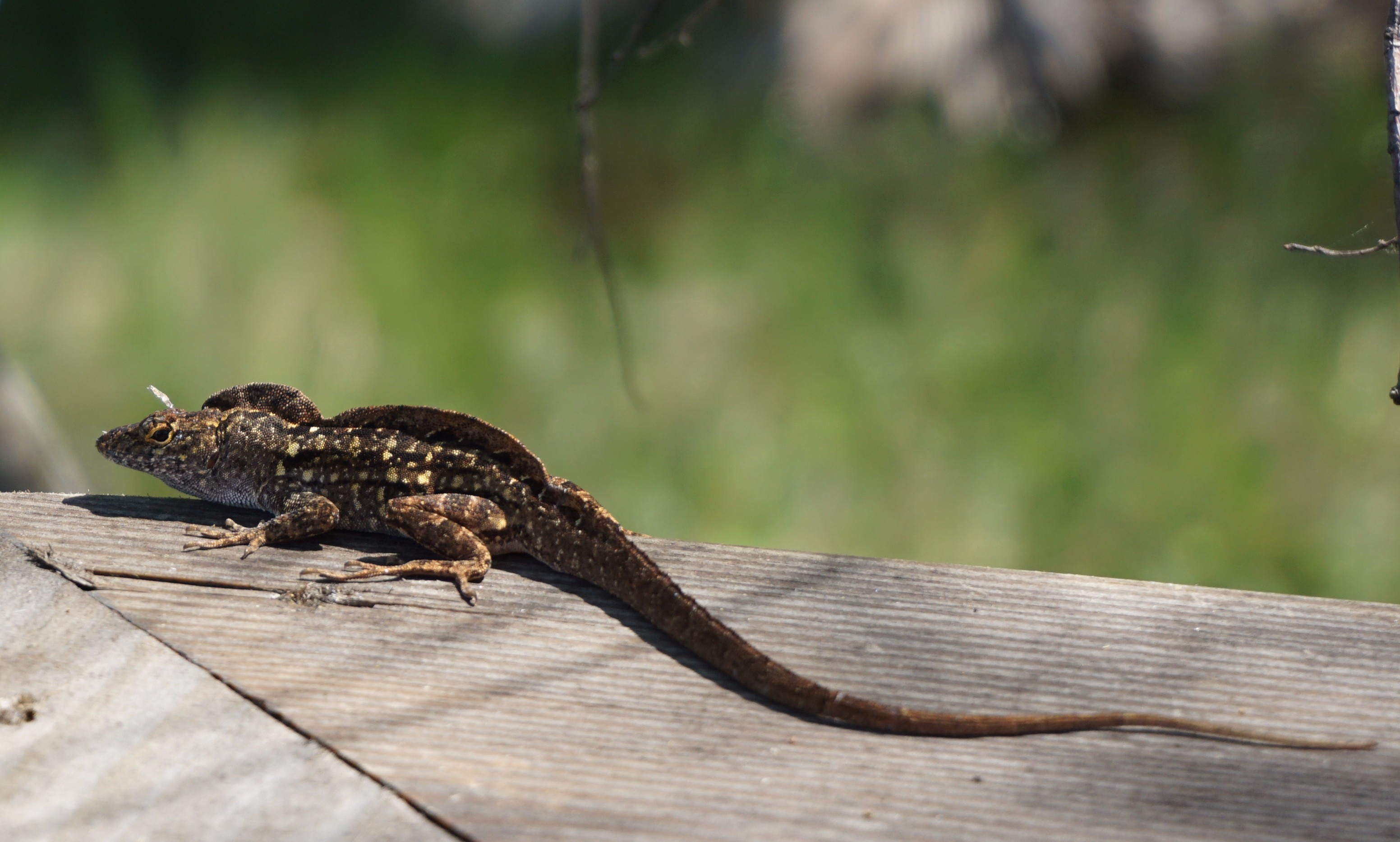
Brown anole in Rockport, Texas

== Communication ==
Anoles use visual cues as their primary signaling mode.
