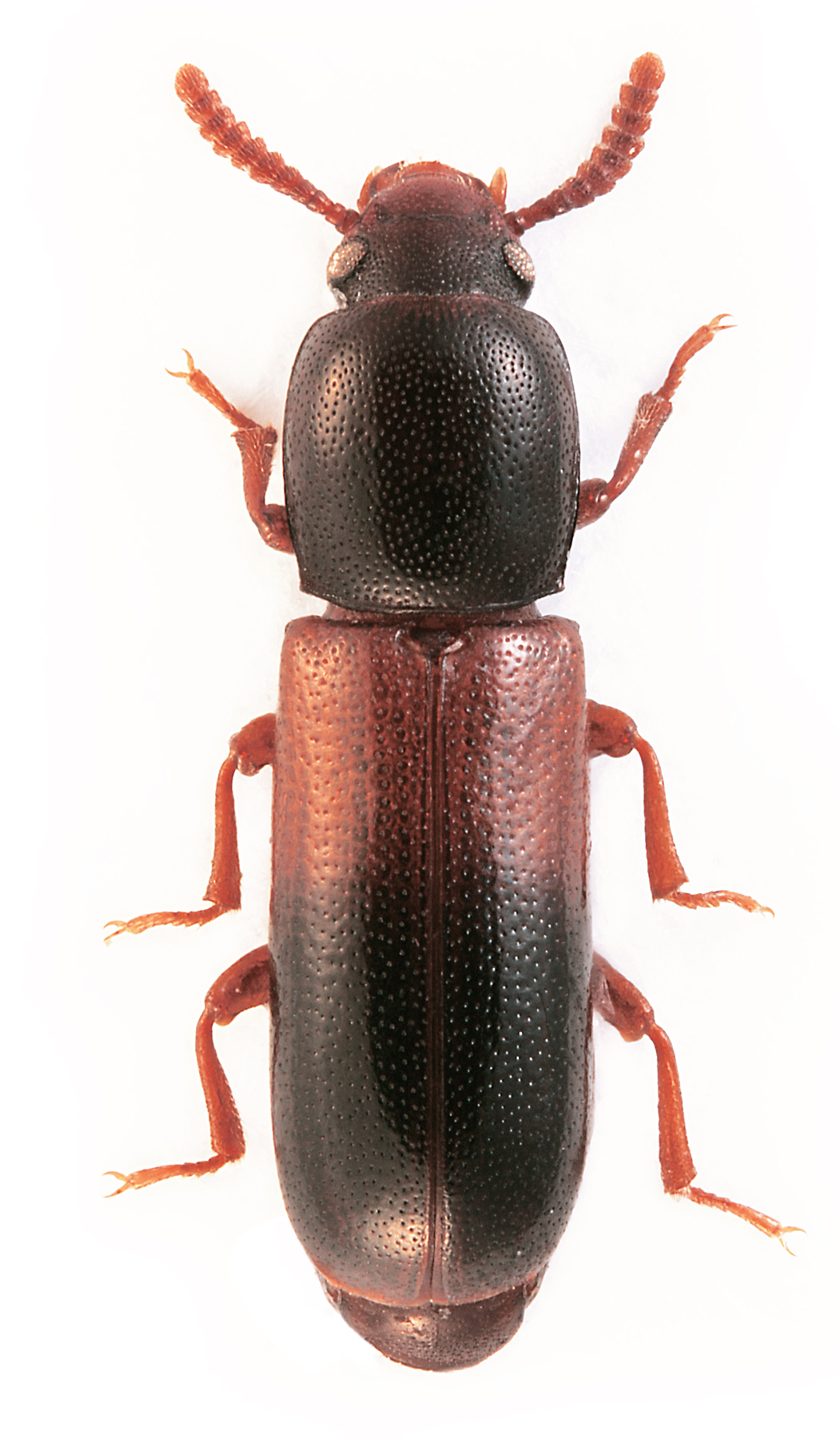

Scientific classification
- Kingdom: Animalia
- Phylum: Arthropoda
- Class: Insecta
- Order: Coleoptera
- Suborder: Polyphaga
- Infraorder: Cucujiformia
- Family: Tenebrionidae
- Genus: Corticeus
- Species: C. fasciatus

Binomial name
- Corticeus fasciatus (Fabricius, 1790)

= Corticeus fasciatus =

Species of beetle

Corticeus fasciatus is a species of beetle belonging to the family Tenebrionidae.
