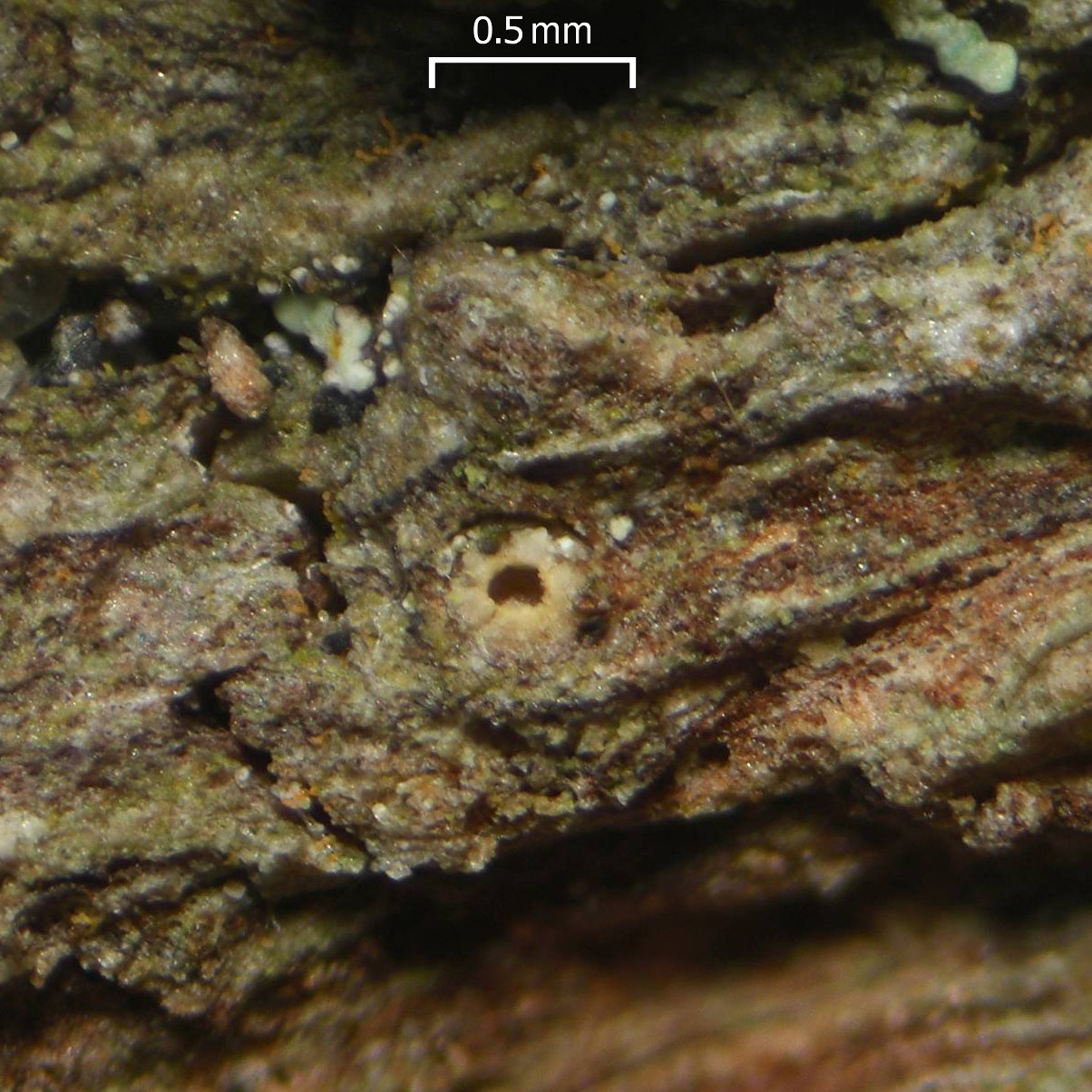
- Ramonia microspora

Scientific classification
- Kingdom: Fungi
- Division: Ascomycota
- Class: Lecanoromycetes
- Order: Gyalectales
- Family: Gyalectaceae
- Genus: Ramonia; Stizenb. (1862)

Type species
- Ramonia valenzueliana (Mont.) Stizenb. (1862)

= Ramonia =

Genus of lichen-forming fungi

Ramonia is a genus of lichen-forming fungi in the family Gyalectaceae. Species form thin crusts on bark or rock and partner with the green alga Trentepohlia as their photosynthetic partner. They are recognized by their distinctive urn-shaped apothecia (fruiting bodies), whose inrolled rims nearly close over the spore-producing surface, leaving only a small central pore. About 22 species are accepted, found mainly in tropical and temperate regions.

== Taxonomy ==
The genus was circumscribed by Ernst Stizenberger in 1862, with Ramonia valenzueliana as the type species. In the protologue, Stizenberger distinguished Ramonia from the preceding genus Urceolaria chiefly by its polysporous asci and its stichoseptate spores (with spores divided by multiple septa into a row of cells).

Modern molecular phylogenetics work has suggested that the traditional circumscription of Ramonia is closely tied to that of Thelopsis. In a three-locus phylogenetic study using nrLSU, mtSSU, and RPB2 sequences, Damien Ertz and coauthors found that Thelopsis was polyphyletic, and that R. valenzueliana was recovered as the sister species of T. melathelia. On that basis, they transferred the latter species to Ramonia as Ramonia melathelia. The authors also argued that Ramonia, as then understood, appears morphologically heterogeneous. They suggested that characters such as a wrinkled ascomatal surface, a darker exciple, and ascospores with a thick gelatinous sheath may help indicate closer relationships within the group, but concluded that broader sampling is still needed to clarify the limits of Ramonia and its relationship to Thelopsis.

The genus name Ramonia honours Ramón Dionisio José de la Sagra (1798–1871), who was a Spanish anarchist, politician, writer, and botanist who founded the world's first anarchist journal, El Porvenir (Spanish for "The Future").

== Description ==
Ramonia species form a thin, crust-like thallus (vegetative body) that spreads indefinitely over the surface, sometimes sinking into the substrate so that little is visible externally. No distinct border zone (prothallus) develops at the edge of the thallus. The photosynthetic partner (photobiont) is from the green algal genus Trentepohlia, whose cells are roughly spherical, 6–10 μm wide, and packed closely together or arranged in short chains.

The fruiting bodies are apothecia (open, disc-bearing structures) that begin partly embedded in the thallus and later push through the surface to sit directly on it. They are urn-shaped (urceolate), with a strongly inrolled rim (exciple) that curves over the spore-producing surface and nearly closes it, leaving only a small central pore. The disc beneath is concave and pale pink to pale grey. The exciple eventually splits along radial lines. In cross-section it is cup-shaped, hyaline to brown, and built from diamond-shaped or nearly spherical, tissue-like (parenchymatous) cells 3–7 μm wide, with short inward-pointing hairs (periphyses) lining its inner edge.

The spore-bearing layer (hymenium) is colourless and stains blue with iodine (KI+ blue). The paraphyses (sterile filaments between the asci) are unbranched, sometimes with swollen tips. The asci (spore-producing cells) are narrowly cylindrical to club-shaped and contain (2–)8 to many spores; they are of the Gyalecta-type, with a thin, iodine-positive wall and a poorly developed, non-amyloid plug ([tholus). The ascospores range from simple (undivided) to transversely septate or muriform (divided by both cross-walls and longitudinal walls into a brick-like pattern), and are oblong to spindle-shaped or ellipsoidal, colourless, thin-walled, and surrounded by a gelatinous outer layer (perispore). No asexual fruiting structures (conidiomata) are known. No secondary metabolites have been detected.

== Species ==
- Ramonia absconsa (Tuck.) Vězda (1966)
- Ramonia athallina Sherwood (1977)
- Ramonia calcicola Canals & Gómez-Bolea (1992)
- Ramonia cupellina Vězda (1966)
- Ramonia elixii Kalb (2001) – Tanzania
- Ramonia elongata Gagarina (2015)
- Ramonia eungellae Kalb (2001)
- Ramonia extensa Lendemer, K.Knudsen & Coppins (2009)
- Ramonia himelbrantii Gagarina (2013) – Russia
- Ramonia leptospora (Müll.Arg.) Vězda (1973)
- Ramonia longispora Aptroot & Schumm (2023)
- Ramonia melathelia (Nyl.) Ertz (2021)
- Ramonia micrococca Vězda (1973)
- Ramonia microspora Vězda (1966)
- Ramonia minima J.Kalb & Kalb (2017)
- Ramonia nepalensis G.Thor & Vězda (1984)
- Ramonia rappii Vězda (1966)
- Ramonia subantarctica Øvstedal (2001)
- Ramonia subsphaeroides (Tav.) Vězda (1966)
- Ramonia valenzueliana (Mont.) Stizenb. (1862)
- Ramonia variespora Sobreira, Aptroot & M.Cáceres (2015)
- Ramonia vermispora Lendemer & K.Knudsen (2008)
- Ramonia xylophila Aptroot (2020)
