= Caloplaca lucifuga =

Scientific classification
- Domain: Eukaryota
- Kingdom: Fungi
- Division: Ascomycota
- Class: Lecanoromycetes
- Order: Teloschistales
- Family: Teloschistaceae
- Genus: Caloplaca
- Species: C. lucifuga

Binomial name
- Caloplaca lucifuga G.Thor

Species of fungus

Caloplaca lucifuga is a species of fungus belonging to the family Teloschistaceae.

It is native to Europe and America.
