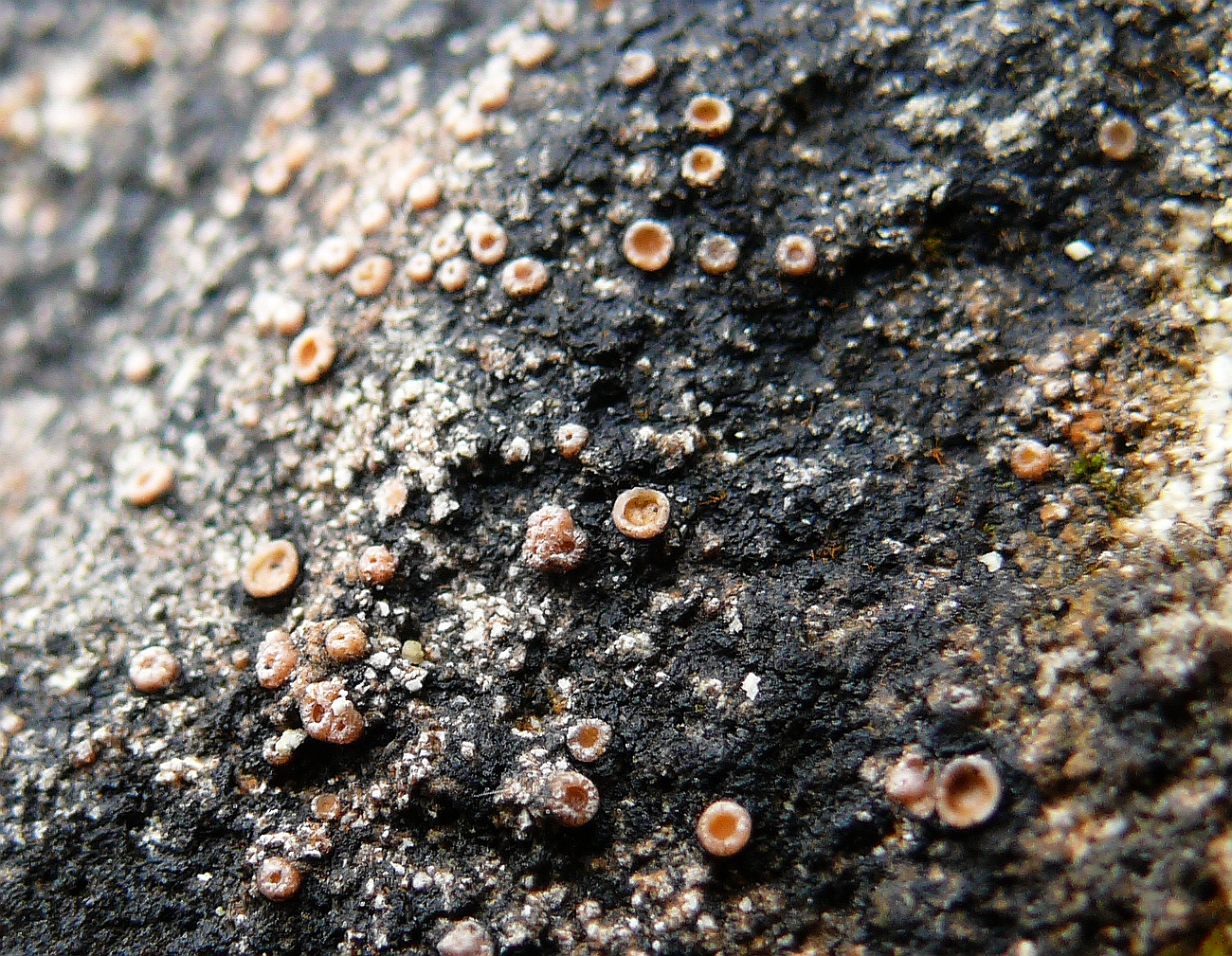
- Gyalecta jenensis, Schwäbische Alb, Germany

Scientific classification
- Kingdom: Fungi
- Division: Ascomycota
- Class: Lecanoromycetes
- Order: Gyalectales
- Family: Gyalectaceae
- Genus: Gyalecta; Ach. (1808)

Type species
- Gyalecta cupularis (Hedw.) Schaer. (1826)

Species
- ~50

Synonyms
- Bacidiopsis Bagl. (1861); Belonia Körb. (1856); Beloniella Th.Fr. (1877); Beloniomyces Cif. & Tomas. (1953); Cryptolechia A.Massal. (1853); Gyalectomyces E.A.Thomas ex Cif. & Tomas. (1953); Phialopsis Körb. (1855); Secoliga Norman (1852); Volvaria DC. (1805)

= Gyalecta =

Genus of lichen-forming fungi

Gyalecta is a genus of lichen-forming fungi in the family Gyalectaceae that contains 50 species. Gyalecta was circumscribed by lichenologist Erik Acharius in 1808. It forms associations with Trentepohlia algae.

== Selected species ==
As of April 2023, Species Fungorum (in the Catalogue of Life) accepts 41 species of Gyalecta.

- Gyalecta amsterdamensis Ertz (2021)
- Gyalecta ancistrospora Aptroot & K.H.Moon (2014)
- Gyalecta arbuti (Bagl.) Baloch & Lücking (2013)
- Gyalecta azorellae Øvstedal (2007)
- Gyalecta bicellulata (Kalb) D.Hawksw. & Lücking (2019)
- Gyalecta biformis (Körb.) H.Olivier (1911)
- Gyalecta calcicola (Walt.Watson) Baloch & Lücking (2013)
- Gyalecta caudata (Kalb) D.Hawksw. & Lücking (2019)
- Gyalecta caudiospora Z.F.Jia (2019)
- Gyalecta coralloidea Kalb (2008)
- Gyalecta derivata (Nyl.) H.Olivier (1911)
- Gyalecta flotovii Körb. (1855)
- Gyalecta foveolaris (Ach.) Schaer. (1836)
- Gyalecta geoica (Wahlenb.) Ach. (1808)
- Gyalecta gyalizella (Nyl.) Baloch & Lücking (2013)
- Gyalecta herculina (Rehm) Baloch, Lumbsch & Wedin (2013)
- Gyalecta himalayensis (Vězda & Poelt) Baloch & Lücking (2013)
- Gyalecta hokkaidica Gagarina (2015)
- Gyalecta incarnata (Th.Fr. & Graewe ex Th.Fr.) Baloch & Lücking (2013)
- Gyalecta jenensis (Batsch) Zahlbr. (1924)
- Gyalecta kibiensis H.Harada & Yoshim. (2005)
- Gyalecta lumbrispora (Etayo) Baloch & Lücking (2013)
- Gyalecta lyngei Baloch & Lücking (2013)
- Gyalecta mediterranea (Nav.-Ros. & Llimona) Baloch & Lücking (2013)
- Gyalecta nana
- Gyalecta nidarosiensis (Kindt) Baloch & Lücking (2013)
- Gyalecta nigritella Cl.Roux & M.Bertrand (2014)
- Gyalecta obesispora R.C.Harris & Lendemer (2013)
- Gyalecta ophiospora (Lettau) Baloch & Lücking (2013)
- Gyalecta pellucida (Coppins & Malcolm) Baloch & Lücking (2013)
- Gyalecta perithecioidea Aptroot (2020)
- Gyalecta pittieriana (Kalb, G.Lugo & J.E.Hern.) D.Hawksw. & Lücking (2019)
- Gyalecta russula (Körb. ex Nyl.) Baloch, Lumbsch & Wedin (2013)
- Gyalecta saxatilis (Vězda) D.Hawksw. & Lücking (2019)
- Gyalecta stellaris (Müll.Arg.) D.Hawksw. & Lücking (2019)
- Gyalecta titovii Gagarina (2011)
- Gyalecta truncigena (Ach.) Hepp (1853)
- Gyalecta ulleungdoensis S.Y.Kondr., Lőkös & Hur (2019)
- Gyalecta ulmi (Sw.) Zahlbr. (1890)
- Gyalecta uniseptata Aptroot (2020)
- Gyalecta uncinata (P.M.McCarthy & Kantvilas) Baloch & Lücking (2013)
- Gyalecta vezdana (Malcolm & Coppins) Baloch & Lücking (2013)

== Gallery ==
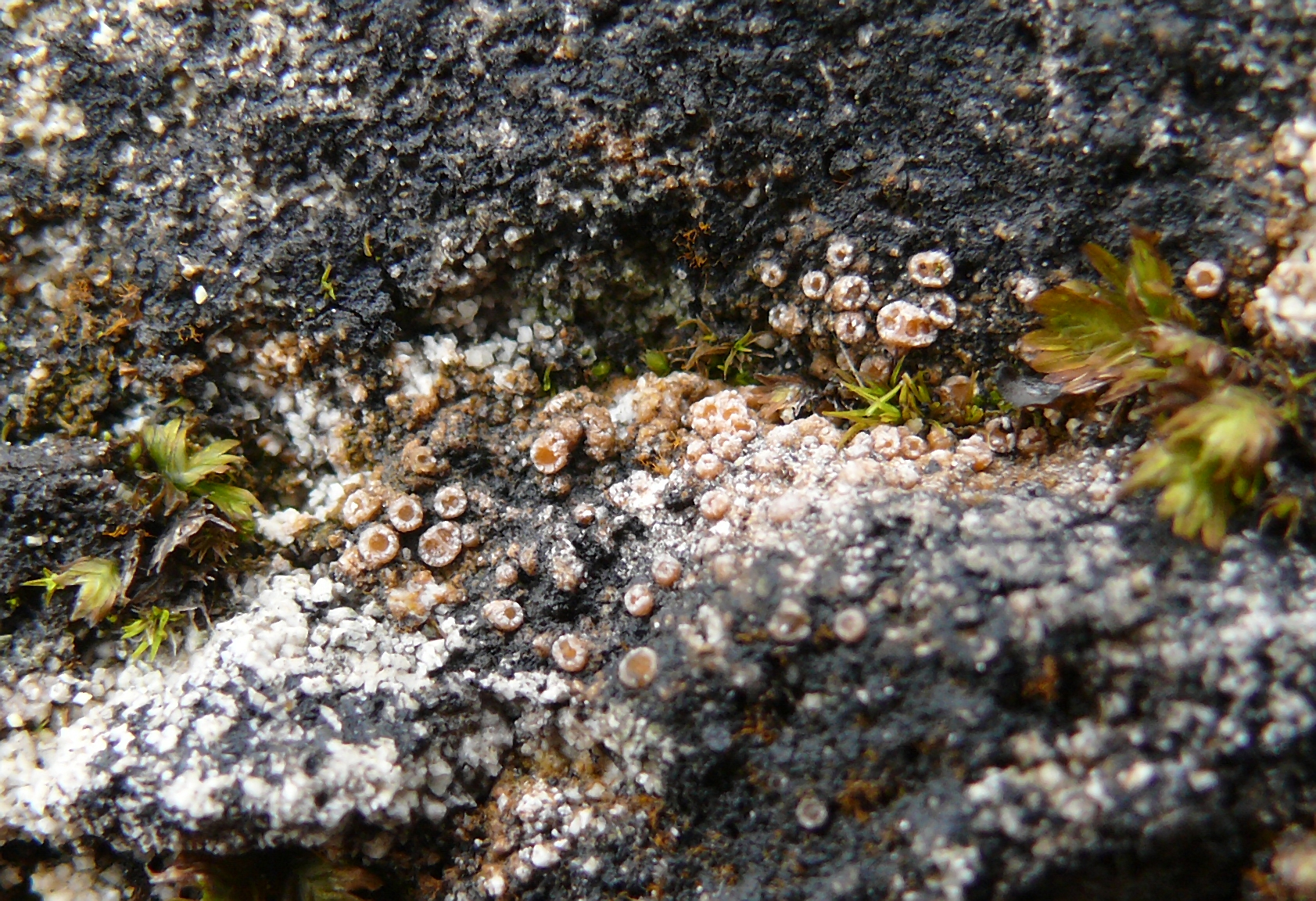
Gyalecta jenensis, Schwäbische Alb, Germany
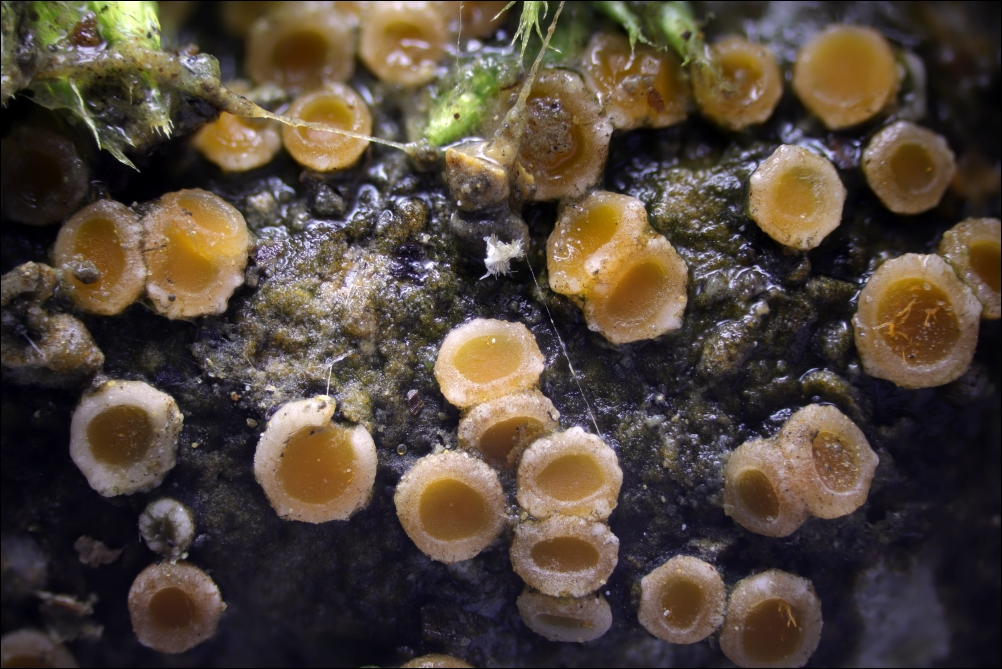
Gyalecta jenensis, Apothecien
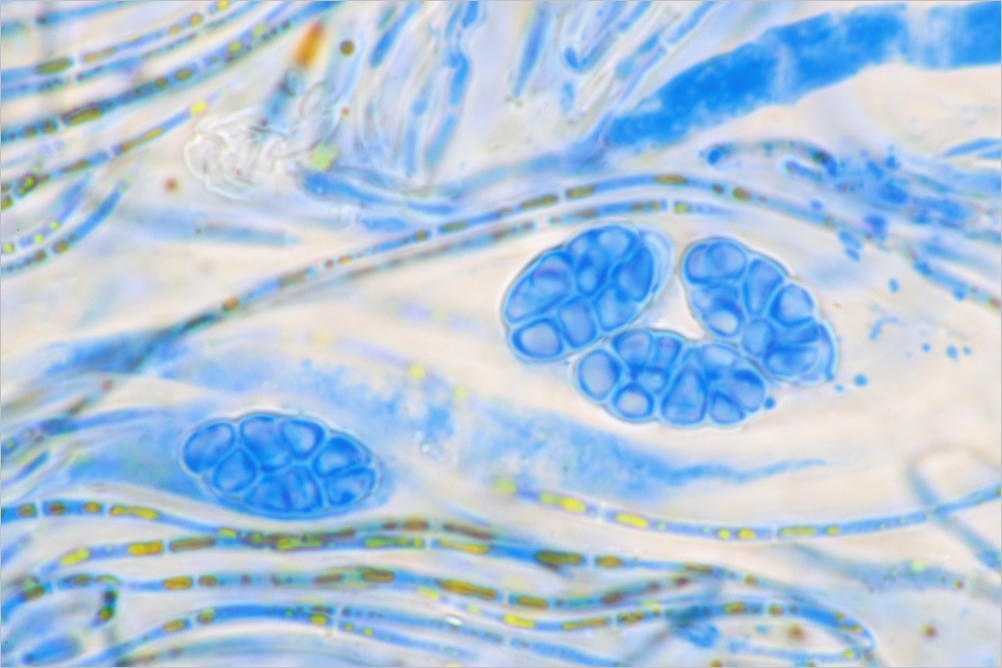
Gyalecta jenensis, colored spores
