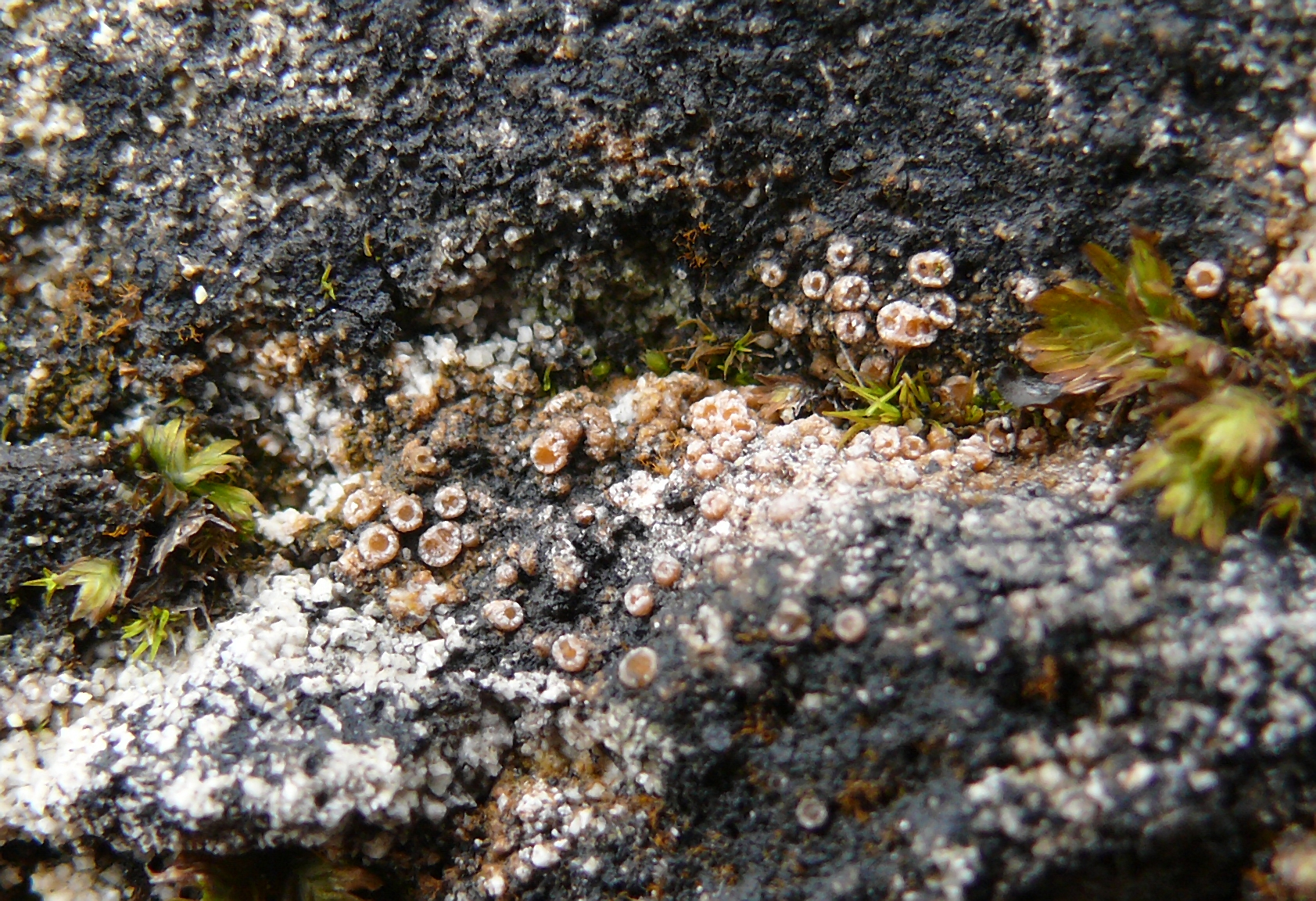
- Gyalecta jenensis, member of the family Gyalectaceae

Scientific classification
- Kingdom: Fungi
- Division: Ascomycota
- Class: Lecanoromycetes
- Order: Gyalectales
- Family: Gyalectaceae; Stizenb. (1862)

Type genus
- Gyalecta Ach. (1808)

Genera
- Francisrosea; Gyalecta; Neopetractis; Ramonia; Semigyalecta

= Gyalectaceae =

Family of fungi

The Gyalectaceae are a family of fungi in the order Gyalectales.

== Genera ==
According to a 2022 estimate, Gyalectaceae contains 6 genera and 89 species (including 11 species in genus Cryptolechia).

- Clathroporinopsis M.Choisy (1929) – 1 sp.
- Francisrosea Ertz & Sanderson (2021) – 1 sp.
- Gyalecta Ach. (1808) – 50 spp.
- Neopetractis Ertz (2021) – 2 spp.
- Ramonia Stizenb. (1862) – 24 spp.
- Semigyalecta Vain. (1921) – 1 spp.

The genus Cryptolechia was synonymized with Gyalecta in 2019.
