= Caloplaca kiewkaensis =

Scientific classification
- Kingdom: Fungi
- Division: Ascomycota
- Class: Lecanoromycetes
- Order: Teloschistales
- Family: Teloschistaceae
- Genus: Caloplaca
- Species: C. kiewkaensis

Binomial name
- Caloplaca kiewkaensis L.S.Yakovczenko, I.A.Galanina & S.Y.Kondr. (2011)
- Holotype site: Kiewka settlement, Russian Far East

Species of lichen

Caloplaca kiewkaensis is a species of bark- and wood-dwelling crustose lichen in the family Teloschistaceae. Described as a new species in 2011, this lichen is found in the Far East region of Russia, specifically within Primorsky Krai.

== Taxonomy ==
Caloplaca kiewkaensis was identified and formally described as a new species in 2011 by the lichenologists Lidia Yakovczenko, Irinia Galanina, and Sergey Kondratyuk. Its species epithet refers to the type locality near the Kiewka settlement in the Primorsky Krai region of Russia.

== Description ==
The lichen has a thallus that can grow up to 1–1.5 cm wide. It is relatively thin, continuous, and conforms to the surface of its substrate. The thallus is generally whitish-grey to grey, or partially whitish-yellow-grey with pink-violet spots due to the presence of pycnidia. A hypothallus has not been observed to occur in this species.

Apothecia of C. kiewkaensis are numerous, scattered or sometimes aggregated, measuring 0.2–0.8 mm in diameter and 0.3–0.38 mm thick. They are rounded, wart-like, and biatorine with a yellowish to pale yellow-orange proper margin and a pale or dark yellowish-brown disc, which eventually becomes brown-black to aeruginose-black. The thalline exciple is zeorine, grey or whitish-grey, and blends with the thallus. The hymenium is greyish due to oil droplet agglomerations, and the asci typically contain 1–8 spores. The ascospores are broadly ellipsoid or almost spherical, colourless or greyish, with a wide septum. Pycnidia with mature conidia were not observed to occur in the studied specimens.

The cortical layer of the thallus and thalline exciple, as well as the outer layer of the true exciple and epihymenium, react to a solution of potassium hydroxide (i.e., the K spot test)) by turning purple or, in places, purple-black.

== Similar species ==
Caloplaca kiewkaensis is similar to the arctic species Austroplaca sibirica, but it differs in having a more developed thallus, larger and thicker apothecia with much darker discs, a higher hymenium, and a broader ascospore septum. It also shows similarities to C. letrouitioides but differs in having thicker, distinctly zeorine apothecia and a scleroplectenchymatous true exciple.

The morphology of C. kiewkaensis is somewhat reminiscent of species in the genus Letrouitia but differs in having bipolar ascospores. Its hymenium and subhymenium characteristics, particularly the presence of numerous oil droplets, are similar to Franwilsia bastowii and Caloplaca kilcundaensis from Australia but differ in apothecia thickness, thallus colour, and ascospore dimensions.

== Habitat and distribution ==
At the time of its original publication, Caloplaca kiewkaensis had been found in several locations within the Primorsky region in the Russian Far East. Caloplaca kiewkaensis is found on the wood and bark of Quercus mongolica. It often coexists with other lichen species, including Opeltia flavorubescens.

== See also ==
- List of Caloplaca species
