= Architrypethelium lauropaluanum =

Scientific classification
- Kingdom: Fungi
- Division: Ascomycota
- Class: Dothideomycetes
- Order: Trypetheliales
- Family: Trypetheliaceae
- Genus: Architrypethelium
- Species: A. lauropaluanum

Binomial name
- Architrypethelium lauropaluanum Lücking, M.P.Nelsen & Marcelli (2016)
- Type locality: Reserva Particular do Patrimônio Natural, Brazil

Species of lichen-forming fungus

Architrypethelium lauropaluanum is a species of crustose lichen-forming fungus in the family Trypetheliaceae. The lichen forms an olive-yellow, crusty patch on tree bark with a distinctively bumpy, wart-like surface. Its reproductive structures are flask-shaped bodies deeply embedded between the raised bumps, and it produces unusually large ascospores that typically have three divisions. The species is found in montane Atlantic rainforest regions of Brazil and has also been recorded from lowland rainforest in Peru.

== Taxonomy ==
Architrypethelium lauropaluanum was described as a new species by Robert Lücking, Matthew Nelsen, and Marcelo Marcelli. The type material was collected in Brazil (Minas Gerais, Serra do Caraça) on July 27, 2010, where the lichen was found growing on bark in montane Atlantic rainforest at about 1,300–1,400 m (4,300–4,600 ft) elevation.

The specific epithet honors Padre Lauro Palú, long-time director of the Santuário do Caraça and a colleague of Marcelli. The species was placed in Architrypethelium because of its large ascospores, which are principally three-septate with the characteristic septal structure reported for the genus; as the spores mature they often develop additional, less distinct septa.

It can be separated from the similar A. hyalinum by the position of its perithecia (flask-shaped fruiting bodies), which are deeply immersed between strongly raised thallus warts rather than more superficial, and by the tendency for its ascospores to develop extra septa. Several species of the related genus Astrothelium can produce broadly similar, large spores, but differ in their reproductive structures and chemistry: A. megalophthalmum forms pseudostromata (aggregated structures containing multiple fruiting bodies) and lacks lichexanthone, A. pictum also forms pseudostromata and has a red medullary pigment, and A. diplocarpoides has smaller spores, an inspersed hamathecium, and lichexanthone that also occurs on the perithecial warts.

In later molecular analyses, A. lauropaluanum has variously appeared in a sister relationship to A. robustum, to A. murisporum, and close to A. uberinum.

== Description ==
The thallus is crustose and grows on bark, forming a continuous, olive-yellow patch up to about 7 cm (2.8 in) across. Its surface is coarsely uneven, with prominent, wart-like, gall-forming bumps about 1–3 mm in diameter. In cross section the cortex is thin, the photobiont layer is irregular, and a thick medulla extends into the modified outer bark; both the photobiont layer and medulla are densely encrusted with numerous small crystals.

Fruiting bodies are solitary perithecia that sit deeply between the thallus bumps. Each perithecium is roughly spherical to somewhat pear-shaped, about 0.5–0.7 mm wide and up to 1 mm tall, and opens via a small, brownish, papillate ostiole about 0.1–0.2 mm across; the ostiole may be apical or somewhat off-center. The excipulum is carbonized and about 50–150 µm thick, with an outer covering of amorphous orange-brown tissue. The hamathecium consists of a dense network of very thin, branching paraphyses embedded in a clear gelatinous matrix and is iodine-negative (IKI-). Asci contain eight hyaline, spindle-shaped ascospores measuring about 100–120 × 25–30 µm; they usually have three main septa but may develop up to seven septa in total, with the later septa often faint, and the spores are also iodine-negative (IKI-).

The thallus contains the secondary metabolite lichexanthone, which causes it to fluoresce yellow under ultraviolet light (UV+ yellow); this substance is not present in the perithecia.

== Habitat and distribution ==
The species is known from montane Atlantic Forest in southeastern Brazil, where it was found on tree bark in disturbed remnants of gallery forest along a small river near the Cascatinha Waterfall in the Serra do Caraça. The type collection comes from about 1,300–1,400 m (4,300–4,600 ft) elevation. In addition to Minas Gerais, other Brazilian states in which A. lauropaluanum has been documented are Pará, São Paulo, and Santa Catarina.

It has also been recorded from the lowlands of southeastern Peru (Madre de Dios), where it was collected on bark at around 270 m (890 ft) in tropical lowland rainforest. Based on current collections, A. lauropaluanum is known from Brazil and Peru.

== See also ==
- List of lichens of Brazil
