= Caloplaca letrouitioides =

Scientific classification
- Domain: Eukaryota
- Kingdom: Fungi
- Division: Ascomycota
- Class: Lecanoromycetes
- Order: Teloschistales
- Family: Teloschistaceae
- Genus: Caloplaca
- Species: C. letrouitioides

Binomial name
- Caloplaca letrouitioides S.Y.Kondr., Elix & Kärnefelt (2011)

Species of lichen

Caloplaca letrouitioides is a little-known species of corticolous (bark-dwelling), crustose lichen belonging to the family Teloschistaceae, described in 2011. It is known to occur in Victoria, Australia. The species was named for its superficial resemblance to species in the genus Letrouitia. The anatomical characteristics of Caloplaca letrouitioides, particularly the well-developed true exciple and the unexpanded paraphyses tips, along with the absence of algae in the apothecia, set it apart from other species in the genus.

== Taxonomy ==
Caloplaca letrouitioides was identified and described in 2011 by the lichenologists Sergey Kondratyuk, John Elix, and Ingvar Kärnefelt. The type specimen was collected by Rex Filson in 1976 from Gunnamatta Beach in Victoria, Australia. Its specific epithet, letrouitioides, alludes to its resemblance to species in the genus Letrouitia.

== Description ==
The thallus of Caloplaca letrouitioides can spread several centimetres wide, characterised by a grey to whitish-grey colour. It is thin and smooth, with a flat to slightly uneven surface. Some parts of the thallus may have blackish edges. The hypothallus is not visible in this species. Apothecia are common, measuring 0.4–0.9 mm in width. They are biatorine, with a distinct yellow to orange margin that is significantly thick and elevated above the disc. The disc is brown to brownish-orange and can be flat to slightly concave. The true exciple of the apothecia is thick, consisting of radiating hyphae, and has a brownish-orange outer layer. The hymenium is hyaline, and the epihymenium has a brownish-orange hue. The asci typically contain 2–4 spores, with ascospores being elongated to cylindrical ellipsoid in shape with a broad septum. Pycnidia are dark reddish, but conidia were not observed in the type specimen.

Chemical analysis of Caloplaca letrouitioides shows that the epithecium and outer portions of the true exciple react to potassium hydroxide (i.e., the K spot test) by turning reddish-purple.

=== Similar species ===
Caloplaca kiewkaensis is similar to C. letrouitioides, with both species featuring a very thin, smooth, greyish or greyish-white thallus without isidia and soredia, and a thick proper margin above the disc level with medium-sized ascospores with a broad septum. However, C. kiewkaensis is distinguished by its thicker, zeorine apothecia (as opposed to the biatorine type in C. letrouitioides), a scleroplectenchymatous true exciple, eight-spored asci with oil droplets (compared to 2–4 spored in C. letrouitioides), somewhat wider ascospores, and a narrower ascospore septum.

== Habitat and distribution ==
At the time of its original publication, Caloplaca letrouitioides was known only from the type collection made in Victoria, Australia. The species grows on the bark of thin twigs.

== See also ==
- List of Caloplaca species
