= Megalospora austropacifica =

Scientific classification
- Kingdom: Fungi
- Division: Ascomycota
- Class: Lecanoromycetes
- Order: Teloschistales
- Family: Megalosporaceae
- Genus: Megalospora
- Species: M. austropacifica

Binomial name
- Megalospora austropacifica Lumbsch, Naikatini & Lücking (2011)
- Holotype site: Taveuni, Fiji

Species of lichen

Megalospora austropacifica is a species of corticolous (bark-dwelling), crustose lichen in the family Megalosporaceae. It is found on the islands of Taveuni and Viti Levu in Fiji. It has a yellowish grey to whitish grey, glossy thallus that is thick and may appear slightly wrinkled or smooth, often with irregular cracks and small papillae containing conidiomata, but lacking isidia and soredia. Its apothecia (fruiting bodies) are circular, up to 4.5 mm in diameter, with the disc evolving from concave to slightly convex and coloured from orange-brown to red-brown, surrounded by a thick, prominent margin.

== Taxonomy ==
The lichen was described as new to science in 2011 by the lichenologists Helge Thorsten Lumbsch, Alifereti Naikatini, and Robert Lücking. The type specimen was collected in Fiji, specifically along the access road to the summit of Devo Peak on Taveuni. The specimen was found in a mountainous relict forest adjacent to the roadside. The species epithet alludes to its South Pacific distribution.

== Description ==
Megalospora austropacifica is distinguished by its yellowish grey to whitish grey thallus, which has a glossy surface. The thallus is thick and may have a slightly wrinkled (rugulose) appearance or be smooth and continuous. Often, it shows irregular cracks and may have small papillae, which contain conidiomata (asexual reproductive structures). Unlike some lichens, it lacks isidia and soredia, which are vegetative propagules related to reproduction.

The apothecia (fruiting bodies) of Megalospora austropacifica are a common feature and are circular in shape. They can reach up to 4.5 mm in diameter and up to 1 mm in height. When young, the disc of the apothecium is concave, but as it matures, it flattens or becomes slightly convex. The colour of the disc ranges from orange-brown to red-brown, turning blackish near the margins. These discs are glossy and lack a powdery coating (epruinose).

The margin of the apothecium is thick and prominent. Its inner part, known as the proper exciple, is yellowish brown to pale brown and has a matte, non-powdery appearance. The outer part, the thalline margin, matches the colour of the thallus and is glossy and epruinose. The exciple itself has an orange-brown inner part and a translucent ectal part that is unreactive to potassium hydroxide (K−).

The epihymenium, the topmost layer of the apothecium, is orange-brown and measures 20–35 μm in thickness. The hypothecium, the tissue layer beneath the hymenium, varies from clear to orange in colour. The hymenium is 200–250 μm high, clear (hyaline), inspersed with particles, and has an amyloid reaction. The asci typically contain eight spores each. Individual ascospores of Megalospora austropacifica are clear and two-celled, with a slight curve reminiscent of the sulphurata-type spores. They measure 60–85 by 22–26 μm, with spore walls that are 2–3 μm thick and have a thin, smooth outer layer (epispore). In terms of chemistry, this lichen produces usnic acid and zeorin.

== Similar species ==
Megalospora austropacifica is part of the Megalospora sulphurata species complex, a group known for asci containing multiple two-celled, usually curved ascospores. Initially, Megalospora sulphurata was broadly defined by Sipman in 1983, but subsequent studies by Ludmilla Untari in 2006 led to the differentiation of additional species within this complex.

Megalospora austropacifica sets itself apart from other species in this group through several distinct features. Unlike M. flavoexcipulata and M. sulphurata, it has a hypothecium that ranges from hyaline (clear) to orange in colour. Compared to M. javanica, M. austropacifica is identified by its lighter apothecial margins, consistently zeorine apothecia (with the apothecial margin not incorporated into the thallus), a paler hypothecium, a hyaline ectal exciple, and ascospores that are longer and narrower. These characteristics help in distinguishing Megalospora austropacifica from closely related species within the complex.

== Habitat and distribution ==
At the time of its original publication, Megalospora austropacifica had been identified exclusively on the Fijian islands of Taveuni and Viti Levu. In these locations, it typically grows in montane forests, both relict and secondary, where it is found on tree bark.
