= Pyrenula sanguineomeandrata =

Scientific classification
- Kingdom: Fungi
- Division: Ascomycota
- Class: Eurotiomycetes
- Order: Pyrenulales
- Family: Pyrenulaceae
- Genus: Pyrenula
- Species: P. sanguineomeandrata

Binomial name
- Pyrenula sanguineomeandrata Aptroot & Merc.-Díaz (2018)
- Holotype: Maricao, Puerto Rico

Species of lichen

Pyrenula sanguineomeandrata is a rare species of corticolous (bark-dwelling) crustose lichen in the family Pyrenulaceae. It was formally described as a new species in 2018 by André Aptroot and Joel Alejandro Mercado Diaz. This distinctive lichen forms a thin, yellowish-brown crust on tree bark with a characteristic net-like pattern of dark red pigmentation across its surface. It is known only from wet mountain forests in Puerto Rico at around 850 metres elevation, where it grows in the Maricao State Forest.

== Taxonomy ==
Pyrenula sanguineomeandrata was described in 2018 by André Aptroot and Joel Mercado-Díaz from material collected in Puerto Rico. It is taxonomically notable as only the second species of Pyrenula known to have a red-pigmented hamathecium. This pigmentation, which reacts with potassium hydroxide (KOH) to produce an orange colour, is chemically and structurally distinct from that found in the similar species P. rubroinspersa, which has a green KOH reaction and likely contains isohypocrellinic acid.

== Description ==
This corticolous (bark-dwelling) lichen forms a thin, smooth, ochraceous (yellowish-brown) thallus up to 0.1 mm thick. The surface is marked with a distinctive reticulate (net-like) or linear pattern of dark red pigmentation. No pseudocyphellae or crystalline deposits are present. The photobiont is a green alga of the genus Trentepohlia.

The ascomata are perithecioid (flask-shaped), simple, and scattered across the thallus. They are pyriform (pear-shaped) and deeply immersed in the bark, with only the apical ostiole (the spore-release pore) visible at the surface. Each ascoma measures 0.2–0.4 mm in diameter and has a dark to reddish-brown ostiole. The wall is black and evenly carbonised, lacking internal crystals.

The hamathecium is densely inspersed with dark red oil droplets, a distinctive feature of the species. The asci are cylindrically club-shaped and contain eight irregularly arranged spores. Ascospores are dark brown, 3-septate, and broadly fusiform (spindle-shaped) with pointed ends. They measure 25–29 × 10–12 μm. The internal lumina are diamond-shaped and are separated from the end wall by an endospore layer. Asexual reproductive structures (pycnidia) are absent.

Chemically, the thallus contains red anthraquinone pigments that fluoresce red under ultraviolet light and react purple with KOH. The red pigment in the hamathecium similarly reacts KOH+ (orange), indicating a distinct chemical composition.

== Habitat and distribution ==
Pyrenula sanguineomeandrata is known only from its type locality in the submontane evergreen forest of the Maricao State Forest in Puerto Rico, where it was found at around 850 m (2,790 ft) elevation. It grows on bark in wet forest conditions and is considered a rare and localised species.

== See also ==
- List of Pyrenula species
