= Megalospora galapagoensis =

Scientific classification
- Kingdom: Fungi
- Division: Ascomycota
- Class: Lecanoromycetes
- Order: Teloschistales
- Family: Megalosporaceae
- Genus: Megalospora
- Species: M. galapagoensis

Binomial name
- Megalospora galapagoensis Bungartz, Ziemmeck & Lücking (2011)
- Holotype site: San Cristóbal Island, Galápagos

Species of lichen

Megalospora galapagoensis is a species of corticolous (bark-dwelling), crustose lichen in the family Megalosporaceae. It is endemic to the Galápagos Islands. The lichen has a yellowish grey to whitish grey, glossy, and thick thallus that can grow up to 20 cm in diameter and has soredia evolving from coarse, corticated granules into confluent formations. Its apothecia (fruiting bodies) are round, grey-black to black, and glossy.

== Taxonomy ==
The lichen was scientifically described as new to science in 2011 by the lichenologists Frank Bungartz, Frauke Ziemmeck, and Robert Lücking. The type specimen was collected in the Galápagos Islands, on San Cristóbal Island, along the trail from Cerro Pelado to El Ripioso, at an elevation of 392 m (1,286 ft). This area is a transition zone and has a forest predominantly comprising Psidium guajava, with some ancient Manchineel (Hippomane mancinella) trees. The understory of the forest is dense, and populated with species like Rubus niveus, Tournefortia rufosericea, and Zanthoxylum fagara. The specimen was gathered from the bark on the south-exposed side of an inclined manchineel trunk, approximately 20 cm in diameter. The collection site was semi-shaded, sheltered from wind and rain, and the specimen was collected in August 2008.

== Description ==
Megalospora galapagoensis has a thallus with a yellowish grey to whitish grey colouration, with a glossy and thick texture. It displays an uneven to slightly rugose surface, expanding up to 20 cm in diameter. The species is characterised by the presence of soredia, which initially appear as coarse, corticated granules before merging into confluent and maculate (spotted) formations.

The species' apothecia are round, measuring 0.5–1.5 mm in diameter and reaching up to 0.6 mm in height. The apothecial discs start as concave in young specimens, flattening or becoming slightly convex as they mature. These discs are grey-black to black, glossy, and lack any pruina. The margins of the apothecia are prominent and thick, with a black colouration. The excipulum is brownish, with the epihymenium having a reddish-brown colour and a thickness of 10–20 μm. The brown hypothecium stands at a height of 100–130 μm.

The hymenium of the species reaches a height of 200–250 μm, is hyaline (translucent), strongly inspersed, and has an amyloid reaction. As for the ascospores, they are singular, hyaline, contain from 3 to 5 septa (internal partitions), and measure 45–75 by 15–25 μm. The secondary chemistry of Megalospora galapagoensis includes usnic acid and zeorin.

== Habitat and distribution ==
At the time of its original publication, Megalospora galapagoensis had only been identified in the Galápagos Islands, specifically on both Santa Cruz and San Cristóbal Islands. It is typically found in areas transitioning to, and within, the humid zones of these islands. Before its description as a new species, it had been recorded as Megalospora tuberculosa in checklists of Galápagos lichens.
