= Megaloblastenia =

Scientific classification
- Domain: Eukaryota
- Kingdom: Fungi
- Division: Ascomycota
- Class: Lecanoromycetes
- Order: Teloschistales
- Family: Megalosporaceae
- Genus: Megaloblastenia; Sipman (1983)

Type species
- Megaloblastenia flavidoatra (Nyl.) Sipman (1983)

Species
- M. flavidoatra M. marginiflexa M. sorediata

Genus of lichens

Megaloblastenia is a genus of crustose lichen-forming fungi in the family Megalosporaceae, comprising three species. Proposed by Dutch lichenologist Harrie Sipman in 1983, the genus is characterised by its thick, ecorticate thallus ranging from pale whitish-grey to yellowish, and its disc-like fruiting bodies (apothecia) that can be biatorine or lecideine. Megaloblastenia lichens form a symbiotic relationship with Dictyochloropsis algae, produce hyaline, bicellular ascospores with polaribilocular structure, and contain chemical compounds such as zeorin, pannarin, or usnic acid. Found in Australasia and South America, these lichens typically grow as epiphytes on trees in moist forests within temperate to tropical oceanic climates.

== Taxonomy ==
Genus Megaloblastenia was proposed by the Dutch lichenologist Harrie Sipman in 1983, with M. flavidoatra assigned as the type species. This species was originally described by William Nylander in 1867 as a member of Lecidea.

== Description ==
Megaloblastenia is a lichen genus with a crustose thallus, meaning it forms a crust-like layer that adheres tightly to its substrate. The thallus is relatively thick and mostly lacks an outer protective layer (ecorticate), and its colour ranges from pale whitish-grey to yellowish. Some specimens may have soredia—tiny structures used for reproduction—while others do not. Unlike many lichens, Megaloblastenia does not contain calcium oxalate crystals. The photosynthetic partner (photobiont) in this lichen is Dictyochloropsis, an alga with nearly spherical cells measuring 6–12 μm in diameter.

The fruiting bodies (ascomata) are disc-like structures called apothecia, which can range from biatorine (with a thallus-coloured margin) to lecideine (with a dark margin) in form. These apothecia are sessile, meaning they sit directly on the surface, and are often constricted at the base. The disc of the apothecia is usually flat or slightly wavy and sometimes has a powdery coating (pruinose). The outer rim (proper exciple) is generally thick, glossy, and persistent, with a cup-shaped cross-section. This exciple is made of tightly packed, radiating fungal filaments (hyphae) that are branched and interconnected (anastomosed).

The spore-producing layer (hymenium) is clear (hyaline) and turns blue when stained with iodine-based stains. The sterile filaments (paraphyses) within the hymenium are slender (about 1–2 μm wide), branched, and interconnected, but they do not have enlarged tips (non-capitate).

The sacs that produce spores (asci) are club-shaped (clavate) and usually contain eight spores, though some spores may abort before fully maturing. The asci have a distinctive blue-staining outer layer and a well-developed blue tholus (a thickened region at the tip), but lack internal divisions. Some asci may also have a short, cone-shaped ocular chamber at the tip. The spores (ascospores) are colourless (hyaline), ellipsoid, and composed of two connected cells (bicellular). The cell walls are thickened at the ends (polar) and at the septum that divides the cells, forming a polaribilocular structure. The two cells are connected by a narrow channel, and the spore wall has two layers.

In addition to sexual reproduction, Megaloblastenia produces asexual reproductive structures called pycnidia, which are embedded in the thallus. These release tiny rod-shaped (bacilliform) spores called conidia that measure 3–5 μm long and about 0.5 μm wide.

The genus contains chemical compounds such as zeorin, along with either pannarin or usnic acid, which are common lichen substances.

== Habitat and distribution ==
Confined to oceanic climates in temperate to tropical regions of Australasia and South America, Megaloblastenia species typically grow as epiphytes on trees in moist forests.

== Species ==
- Megaloblastenia flavidoatra (Nyl.) Sipman (1983) – Australasia
- Megaloblastenia marginiflexa (Hook.f. & Taylor) Sipman (1983) – Australasia; South America
- Megaloblastenia sorediata Kantvilas (2022) – Australia
