= Astrochapsa elongata =

Scientific classification
- Kingdom: Fungi
- Division: Ascomycota
- Class: Lecanoromycetes
- Order: Graphidales
- Family: Graphidaceae
- Genus: Astrochapsa
- Species: A. elongata

Binomial name
- Astrochapsa elongata Poengs. & Lumbsch (2019)

Species of lichen

Astrochapsa elongata is a little-known species of corticolous (bark-dwelling), crustose lichen in the family Graphidaceae. Found only in a specific region of Thailand, it is closely related to Astrochapsa recurva, yet distinguishes itself through its narrower ascospores and absence of secondary metabolites.

== Taxonomy ==
Astrochapsa elongata was described as a new species in 2019 by lichenologists Vasun Poengsungnoen and H. Thorsten Lumbsch. The type specimen was collected at Khok Nok Kraba ranger station in Thailand's Phu Luang Wildlife Sanctuary, on the bark of Rhododendron simsii in low-mountain scrubland. The specific epithet elongata refers to the elongated ascomata found in this species.

== Description ==
Astrochapsa elongata features a corticolous thallus that can grow up to 5 cm (2 in) in diameter and 30–60 μm thick. Its surface is smooth to uneven, cracked, whitish-grey, and slightly glossy. The photobiont associated with this lichen is Trentepohlia, and a medulla is absent. Apothecia are erumpent, angular-rounded to mostly elongate, measuring 3.0–7.0 by 1.5–3.0 mm, and can be simple or sometimes branched. The disc is partly to completely exposed and covered by thick white pruina. Ascospores are submuriform with 15–25 transverse septa and 0–1 longitudinal septum per segment, measuring 40–65 by 10–13 μm. No pycnidia have been observed.

Astrochapsa elongata is very similar to Astrochapsa recurva, but it can be differentiated by its narrower ascospores and the absence of secondary metabolites. Other similar species include Astrochapsa zahlbruckneri, Chapsa cinchonarum, and Pseudochapsa dilatata, which can be distinguished by their ascospore characteristics.

== Habitat and distribution ==
Astrochapsa elongata has been found on the trunk of Rhododendron simsii in northeastern Thailand, specifically in the lower montane scrub. At the time of publication, it was only known to occur at its type locality.
