= Megalospora occidentalis =

Scientific classification
- Domain: Eukaryota
- Kingdom: Fungi
- Division: Ascomycota
- Class: Lecanoromycetes
- Order: Teloschistales
- Family: Megalosporaceae
- Genus: Megalospora
- Species: M. occidentalis

Binomial name
- Megalospora occidentalis Kantvilas (1994)

Species of lichen

Megalospora occidentalis is a species of corticolous (bark-dwelling), crustose lichen in the family Megalosporaceae. Found in Australia, it was formally described as a new species in 1994 by lichenologist Gintaras Kantvilas. The type specimen was collected along the Vasse Highway in Beedelup National Park (Western Australia) at an altitude of 100 m (330 ft); here, in a karri-dominated wet sclerophyll forest, it was found growing on Trymalium floribundum. The lichen has a thin, pale grey to glaucous-grey thallus that usually has scattered soredia. Its ascospores are oblong to ellipsoid in shape, measuring 50–90 by 20–30 μm. They are muriform, meaning they are divided into many internal cells, up to about 22 by 10. The species contains the lichen products pannarin and zeorin. The author named it occidentalis because, at the time of writing, it was the only Western Australian species known in genus Megalospora.
