= Pyrenula rubroinspersa =

Scientific classification
- Kingdom: Fungi
- Division: Ascomycota
- Class: Eurotiomycetes
- Order: Pyrenulales
- Family: Pyrenulaceae
- Genus: Pyrenula
- Species: P. rubroinspersa

Binomial name
- Pyrenula rubroinspersa Aptroot & Sipman (2013)
- Holotype: Cerro Guaiquinima, Venezuela

Species of lichen-forming fungus

Pyrenula rubroinspersa is a species of corticolous (bark-dwelling) crustose lichen in the family Pyrenulaceae. The species is characterized by red oil droplets within the spore-bearing tissue that turn green when treated with potassium hydroxide solution, a reaction caused by the presence of the anthraquinone compound isohypocrellin. It forms a relatively thick yellowish-gray crust on smooth bark and is known only from its type locality in Venezuela, where it grows in well-lit forests.

== Taxonomy ==
This species was described as new by André Aptroot and Harrie Sipman in 2013. The holotype was collected on Cerro Guaiquinima near the northeast edge of the upper plateau (Bolívar, Venezuela); it grew on tree bark in a well-lit forest. The specific epithet alludes to the red inspersion in the hamathecium. The only other Pyrenula species with a similar red inspersion is the Puerto Rican species Pyrenula biseptata, but that species does not contain isohypocrellin, and so does not react K+ (green).

== Description ==
This species has a rather thick, yellowish‑gray thallus that is smooth and lacks pseudocyphellae (minute pores for gas exchange). The perithecia are superficial and hemispherical, 0.5–0.8 mm in diameter, each with a black apical pore. The hamathecium is permeated by red oil droplets that turn green in potassium hydroxide (KOH) solution; this reaction is caused by the anthraquinone compound isohypocrellin. Each ascus contains eight ascospores arranged in a single row. The spores have three cross‑walls and measure 13–16 μm long and 6–8 μm wide. Their internal cavities (lumina) are rounded and wider than long, separated by short dark lines of spore wall material that do not extend to the outer wall. The tips bear a thickened inner layer. Asexual structures have not been seen to occur in this species.

== Habitat and distribution ==
Pyrenula rubroinspersa is corticolous, growing on smooth bark. As of its original publication, it had been recorded only from its original collection site. No additional localities were reported in Aptroot's 2021 world key of Pyrenula.

== See also ==
- List of Pyrenula species
