= Architrypethelium penuriixanthum =

Scientific classification
- Kingdom: Fungi
- Division: Ascomycota
- Class: Dothideomycetes
- Order: Trypetheliales
- Family: Trypetheliaceae
- Genus: Architrypethelium
- Species: A. penuriixanthum

Binomial name
- Architrypethelium penuriixanthum Flakus & Aptroot (2016)

Species of lichen

Architrypethelium penuriixanthum is a species of corticolous (bark-dwelling) lichen in the family Trypetheliaceae. Found in Bolivia, it was formally described as a new species in 2016 by lichenologists Adam Flakus and André Aptroot. The type specimen was collected near Sehuencas village, Carrasco Province (Dept. Cochabamba); there, at an elevation of 2,220 m (7,280 ft) it was found in a mountainous Yungas cloud forest. It is similar to Architrypethelium hyalinum, but unlike that species, does not have lichexanthone in its thallus. The species epithet penuriixanthum alludes to the absence of xanthones.
