= Architrypethelium nitens =

Scientific classification
- Kingdom: Fungi
- Division: Ascomycota
- Class: Dothideomycetes
- Order: Trypetheliales
- Family: Trypetheliaceae
- Genus: Architrypethelium
- Species: A. nitens

Binomial name
- Architrypethelium nitens (Fée) Aptroot (2008)

Synonyms
- Verrucaria nitens Fée (1825); Pyrenula nitens (Fée) Fée (1837)

Species of lichen-forming fungus

Architrypethelium nitens is a species of corticolous (bark-dwelling), crustose lichen in the family Trypetheliaceae. It was first described in 1824 as Verrucaria nitens, and later transferred to Architrypethelium. The lichen forms a smooth, glossy, olive-green crust on bark, with small black, flask-shaped fruiting bodies (perithecia) that are usually partly covered by the thallus. It is a Neotropical species, recorded from Costa Rica, and it can be recognized under the microscope by its large, dark brown ascospores with three internal partitions and a clear, jelly-like outer sheath.

== Taxonomy ==
It was originally described as Verrucaria nitens by the French botanist Antoine Laurent Apollinaire Fée in 1824, and later transferred to Architrypethelium as a new combination. The lectotype specimen was collected in South America on Cinchona bark; the exact locality, collector, and date are unknown, and the specimen is housed in the herbarium of the Naturalis Biodiversity Center.

== Description ==
The thallus (the main lichen body) is olive green, smooth, and glossy, and is UV– in standard lichen spot tests. Its perithecia (flask-shaped fruiting bodies) occur singly or in small groups that may share a common ostiole (opening). They are usually covered by the green thallus, either almost completely or only along the sides. The perithecial wall is thick and fully carbonized (blackened), and the ostiole is typically eccentric (off-center).

Under the microscope, the tissue between the asci (the hamathecium) looks clear instead of speckled with tiny oil droplets (not inspersed), does not change in an iodine test (IKI–), and its filaments often link up into a net-like network (anastomosing). Each ascus contains eight dark brown ascospores divided by three internal septa, with the spore walls partitioned into separate compartments (distoseptate), measuring about 90–150 × 25–50 μm. The end compartments (lumina) are much smaller than the central ones and are rounded at the corners. The spores often contain needle-like crystals and have walls about 3–5 μm thick. They are surrounded by a gelatinous sheath about 7–10 μm wide, and conidiomata (asexual fruiting structures) have not been observed.

== Habitat and distribution ==
The species is Neotropical and has been documented in Costa Rica, including collections from montane rainforest sites around 1,200 to 1,600 m (3,900 to 5,200 ft) elevation. It grows on bark on lower trunks and branches, including on fallen trunks and branches of Ficus pertusa, in disturbed primary forest and secondary vegetation dominated by Cecropia. It has also been collected on fence poles and scattered trees among pasture fields and gardens north of San José at about 1,500 m (4,900 ft).
