= Architrypethelium barrerae =

Scientific classification
- Domain: Eukaryota
- Kingdom: Fungi
- Division: Ascomycota
- Class: Dothideomycetes
- Order: Trypetheliales
- Family: Trypetheliaceae
- Genus: Architrypethelium
- Species: A. barrerae

Binomial name
- Architrypethelium barrerae Guzm.-Guill. & Llar.-Hern. (2022)

Species of lichen

Architrypethelium barrerae is a species of corticolous (bark-dwelling) and crustose lichen in the family Trypetheliaceae. It is found in cloud forests of Xalapa city, Mexico.

== Taxonomy ==
The lichen was formally described as a new species in 2022 by Jorge Guzmán-Guillermo and Régulo Carlos Llarena-Hernández. The type specimen was collected in the El Haya ecological park (Xalapa, Veracruz). The lichen, which is only known from the type locality, occurs in cloud forest at an elevation of 1,300 m (4,300 ft). The specific epithet honours Dr. Clementina Barrera-Bernal, who supported Guzmán-Guillermo's studies.

== Description ==
Architrypethelium barrerae has a thin green to yellowish thallus, with ascomata immersed in the bark substrate, opened by small holes (ostioles) measuring 0.7–1.2 mm in diameter. The ascospores, which number two per ascus, measure 160–200 by 50–75 μm. The lichen contains two secondary compounds (detectable using thin-layer chromatography), an unidentified anthraquinone, and lichexanthone. The latter compound causes the lichen to fluoresce yellow when shone with a UV light. The only other species in genus Architrypethelium known to contain lichexanthone is A. hyalinum, which can be distinguished from A. barrerae by its shorter spores (160–200 by 30–50 μm) and number of spores in the asci (4–8).
