= Marie-Agnès Letrouit-Galinou =

French botanist, mycologist, and lichenologist

- Born: December 14, 1931 (age 94); Mayenne
- Education: University of Rennes; University of Paris
- Awards: Prix Gandoger de Cryptogamie (1968); Acharius Medal (2004)
- Scientific career
- Fields: Lichenology; Mycology; Botany
- Workplaces: CNRS
- Thesis: l'ontogénie et l'anatomie comparées de quelques Discolichens
- Author abbrev. (botany): Letr.-Gal.

Marie-Agnès Letrouit-Galinou (née Galinou; born 1931) is a French botanist, mycologist, and lichenologist, known for her contribution to revolutionizing the scientific understanding of ascomycete development and classification.

== Education and career ==
After secondary education at the Lycée de Jeunes Filles in Rennes, Marie-Agnès Galinou graduated in 1951 with her undergraduate degree from the Faculty des Sciences of the University of Rennes. She married in the mid-1950s and changed her surname to Letrouit-Galinou. She received in 1958 her doctorate from the University of Paris with a doctoral thesis on the comparative anatomy and ontogeny of discolichen ascomata, i.e. those lichenized ascomycetes in which the fruiting body has a rounded or oval shape like a disc. Her doctoral supervisor was Marius Chadefaud. David L. Hawksworth refers her as one of Chadefaud's "gang of four" — consisting of her with André Bellemère, Marie-Claude Janex-Favre, and Agnès Jarguey-Leduc. Under Chadefaud's influence, the four showed that "the then dominating Nannfeldt-Luttrell views of ascomycete development and classification were unsound." By the mid-1970s electron microscopic studies confirmed their research.

In the early part of her career she worked at Rennes with Henry Nicollon des Abbayes and was strongly influenced by him in her study of lichen systematics and ecology. She published in 1958 an outstanding monograph on the genus Laurera. Later in her career she did research on the effects of air pollution on lichens and stimulated other French lichenologists to do such research. She worked in Paris for the CNRS for many years.

In 1976 she was one of the main founders of the Association Française de Lichénologie, served as the Association's first vice-president, and then served as the Association's second president from 1978 to 1980. In 1993 she worked closely with Hawksworth in planning NATO's Advanced Research Workshop on "Ascomycete Systematics" held in Paris. The Workshop was a big success with 140 researchers from 24 countries. At the "Ascomycete Systematics" Workshop the lichenological "gang of four" presented a summary of their now famous results and the concepts introduced by Chadefaud.

Letrouit-Galinou not only promoted lichenology in France, but also did her research with extremely limited financial resources. She and her collaborators had to work with quite inexpensive microscopes. The three women of the "gang of four" painted the walls of their laboratory because they had no funds to hire professional wall painters. When she retired in August 1999 from the CNRS, she donated her library to the Muséum national d'histoire naturelle.

== Selected publications ==
- Chadefaud, M.; Galinou, M. A. (1953). "Sur l'aque des lichens du genre Pertusaria et son importance phylogénétique". Comptes Rendus de l'Académie des Sciences, Série D. 237: 1178–1180.
- Letrouit-Galinou, Marie-Agnès (1968). "The Apothecia of the Discolichens". The Bryologist. 71 (4): 297–327. doi:10.1639/0007-2745(1968)71[297:TAOTD]2.0.CO;2. JSTOR 3241116.
- Letrouit-Galinou, Marie-Agnès (1973). "Sexual Reproduction". The Lichens. pp. 59–90. doi:10.1016/B978-0-12-044950-7.50007-6. ISBN 9780120449507.
- Letrouit-Galinou, Marie-Agnes (1973). "Les Asques des Lichens et le type archaeascé". The Bryologist. 76 (1): 30–47. doi:10.2307/3241230. ISSN 0007-2745. JSTOR 3241230.
- Bellemère, A.; Letrouit-Galinou, M. A. (1981). "The Lecanoralean ascus: an ultrastructural preliminary study". Ascomycete Systematics. Springer Series in Microbiology. New York, NY: Springer. pp. 54–70. doi:10.1007/978-1-4612-5844-5_5. ISBN 978-1-4612-5846-9.
- Galun, Margalith, ed. (1988). "Chapter 5 (part A). Asci, Ascospore, and Ascomata by André Bellemère and Marie Agnes Letrouit-Gallinou". CRC Handbook of Lichenology. Vol. 2. CRC Press. pp. 161–180. ISBN 0-8493-3582-5.
- Seaward, M. R. D.; Letrouit-Galinou, M. A. (1991). "Lichen Recolonization of Trees in the Jardin du Luxembourg, Paris". The Lichenologist. 23 (2): 181–186. doi:10.1017/S0024282991000324. ISSN 0024-2829. S2CID 86084578.
- Galsomiès, L; Ayrault, S; Carrot, F; Deschamps, C; Letrouit-Galinou, M.A (2003). "Interspecies calibration in mosses at regional scale—heavy metal and trace elements results from Ile-de-France". Atmospheric Environment. 37 (2): 241–251. Bibcode:2003AtmEn..37..241G. doi:10.1016/S1352-2310(02)00831-2. ISSN 1352-2310.

== Eponyms ==
=== Family ===
- Letrouitiaceae Bellem. & Hafellner (1982)

=== Genus ===
- Letrouitia Bellem. & Hafellner (1982)
