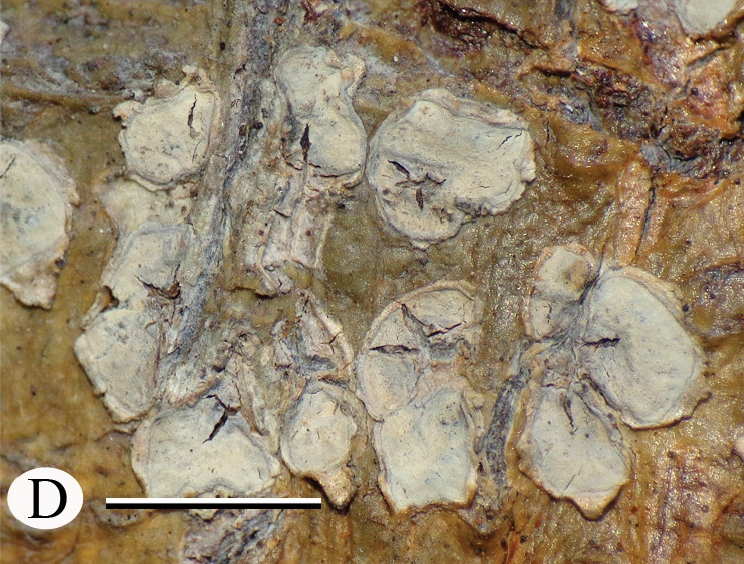
- Astrochapsa mirabilis

Scientific classification
- Kingdom: Fungi
- Division: Ascomycota
- Class: Lecanoromycetes
- Order: Graphidales
- Family: Graphidaceae
- Genus: Astrochapsa; Parnmen, Lücking & Lumbsch (2012)

Type species
- Astrochapsa astroidea (Berk. & Broome) Parnmen, Lücking & Lumbsch (2012)

Species
- See text

= Astrochapsa =

Genus of lichens

Astrochapsa is a genus of lichen-forming fungi in the subfamily Graphidoideae of the family Graphidaceae. It has about 30 species. The genus was circumscribed in 2012, with Astrochapsa astroidea assigned as the type species. It was split from Chapsa because members of this genus usually have a densely skinned thallus, apothecial rims that tend to curve back, and spores that are mostly subdistoseptate (septa slightly thickened; cell spaces angular) and non-amyloid.

== Taxonomy ==
Astrochapsa was established in 2012 by Sittiporn Parnmen, Robert Lücking, and H. Thorsten Lumbsch during a generic-level reclassification of the thelotremoid graphid lichens based on DNA evidence. Their analyses showed that several species then placed in Chapsa formed a coherent, separate lineage; to reflect that evolutionary split, they erected Astrochapsa and made a series of new combinations into the genus. The type species was set as Astrochapsa astroidea.

In practical terms, the authors narrowed the concept of Chapsa (Chapsa sensu stricto) and diagnosed Astrochapsa by a suite of characters that tend to occur together in this clade. These include a bark crust (thallus) that is often more thickened and with a developed outer skin (a dense cortex), fruiting discs whose rim is commonly turned slightly outward (a recurved margin), and colourless spores that show a faint thickening at the internal walls ("subdistoseptate") and do not turn blue with iodine (non-amyloid).

Parnmen and colleagues also provided a set of formal transfers from Chapsa and related genera into Astrochapsa, anchoring the name in current practice and stabilising usage across subsequent taxonomic work on Graphidaceae.

== Description ==
Astrochapsa species form a crust on bark (the thallus) that is usually well "skinned" with a dense outer layer (a cortex), rather than appearing loose or without a cortex. Their fruiting bodies (apothecia) break through the bark surface and are round to irregular; the inner disc is exposed while the rim is often lobed and commonly bends back slightly (recurved). The rim tissue (the excipulum) is typically brown, and the disc itself can be pale or pigmented. Chemically, many species have no detectable lichen substances, though stictic acid derivatives are frequent in some; this is consistent with the mix of "no substances" versus "stictic acid and relatives" reported for the genus.

Under the microscope, the spores are colourless (occasionally pale brown), with one or more cross-walls, and they are elongated from spindle-shaped to more cylindrical. The septa between the spore cells are slightly thickened and the cell cavities look angular—features described as "subdistoseptate". A standard iodine test on the spore wall is negative (I–), meaning the wall does not turn blue and so is considered non-amyloid. Taken together with a mostly densely corticate bark crust and apothecia with an often recurved margin and usually brown rim, these characters provide a practical diagnosis of the genus.

== Habitat and distribution ==
Astrochapsa species are bark-dwelling crustose lichens of warm, humid forests. They are most often found on the trunks and branches of living trees in lowland to montane tropical settings, where the canopy provides steady moisture and subdued light—conditions typical for the thelotremoid graphids that this genus belongs to.

Geographically, the genus is chiefly tropical and subtropical, with records from the Neotropics (including the Caribbean), tropical Africa, and parts of Asia–Pacific. For example, A. martinicensis was described from Martinique in the Lesser Antilles, while A. fusca is known from tropical West Africa; other species treated in the 2012 reclassification reflect similarly broad, pantropical sampling. Together these reports indicate a primarily bark-inhabiting genus spread across humid tropical regions rather than confined to a single continent.

== Species ==
As of October 2025, Species Fungorum (in the Catalogue of Life) accepts 29 species of Astrochapsa:

- Astrochapsa albella Sipman (2014)
- Astrochapsa alstrupii (Frisch) Parnmen, Lücking & Lumbsch (2012)
- Astrochapsa amazonica (Kalb) Parnmen, Lücking & Lumbsch (2012)
- Astrochapsa astroidea (Berk. & Broome) Parnmen, Lücking & Lumbsch (2012)
- Astrochapsa calathiformis (Vain.) Parnmen, Lücking & Lumbsch (2012)
- Astrochapsa columnaris Sipman (2014)
- Astrochapsa elongata Poengs. & Lumbsch (2019)
- Astrochapsa fusca Lücking (2014)
- Astrochapsa graphidioides (Kalb) Parnmen, Lücking & Lumbsch (2012)
- Astrochapsa kalbii Poengs., Lücking & Lumbsch (2014)
- Astrochapsa lassae (Mangold) Parnmen, Lücking & Lumbsch (2012)
- Astrochapsa lobata Lücking (2015)
- Astrochapsa magnifica (Berk. & Broome) Parnmen, Lücking & Lumbsch (2012)
- Astrochapsa martinicensis Ertz & Borgato (2018)
- Astrochapsa mastersonii (Rivas Plata, Lumbsch & Lücking) Parnmen, Lücking & Lumbsch (2012)
- Astrochapsa megaphlyctidioides (Mangold) Parnmen, Lücking & Lumbsch (2012)
- Astrochapsa meridensis (Kalb & Frisch) Parnmen, Lücking & Lumbsch (2012)
- Astrochapsa mirabilis (Zahlbr.) Lücking & S.Joshi (2018)
- Astrochapsa platycarpella (Vain.) Parnmen, Lücking & Lumbsch (2012)
- Astrochapsa pseudophlyctis (Nyl.) Parnmen, Lücking & Lumbsch (2012)
- Astrochapsa pulvereodiscus (Hale) Parnmen, Lücking & Lumbsch (2012)
- Astrochapsa recurva (G.Salisb.) Parnmen, Lücking & Lumbsch (2012)
- Astrochapsa sipmanii Weerakoon & Lücking (2015)
- Astrochapsa stellata (Hale) Parnmen, Lücking & Lumbsch (2012)
- Astrochapsa submuralis E.L.Lima, Lücking & M.Cáceres (2016) – Brazil
- Astrochapsa verruculosa Papong, Lücking & Parnmen (2015)
- Astrochapsa waasii (Hale) Parnmen, Lücking & Lumbsch (2012)
- Astrochapsa wolseleyana (Weerakoon, Lumbsch & Lücking) Parnmen, Lücking & Lumbsch (2012)
- Astrochapsa zahlbruckneri (Redinger) Parnmen, Lücking & Lumbsch (2012)
