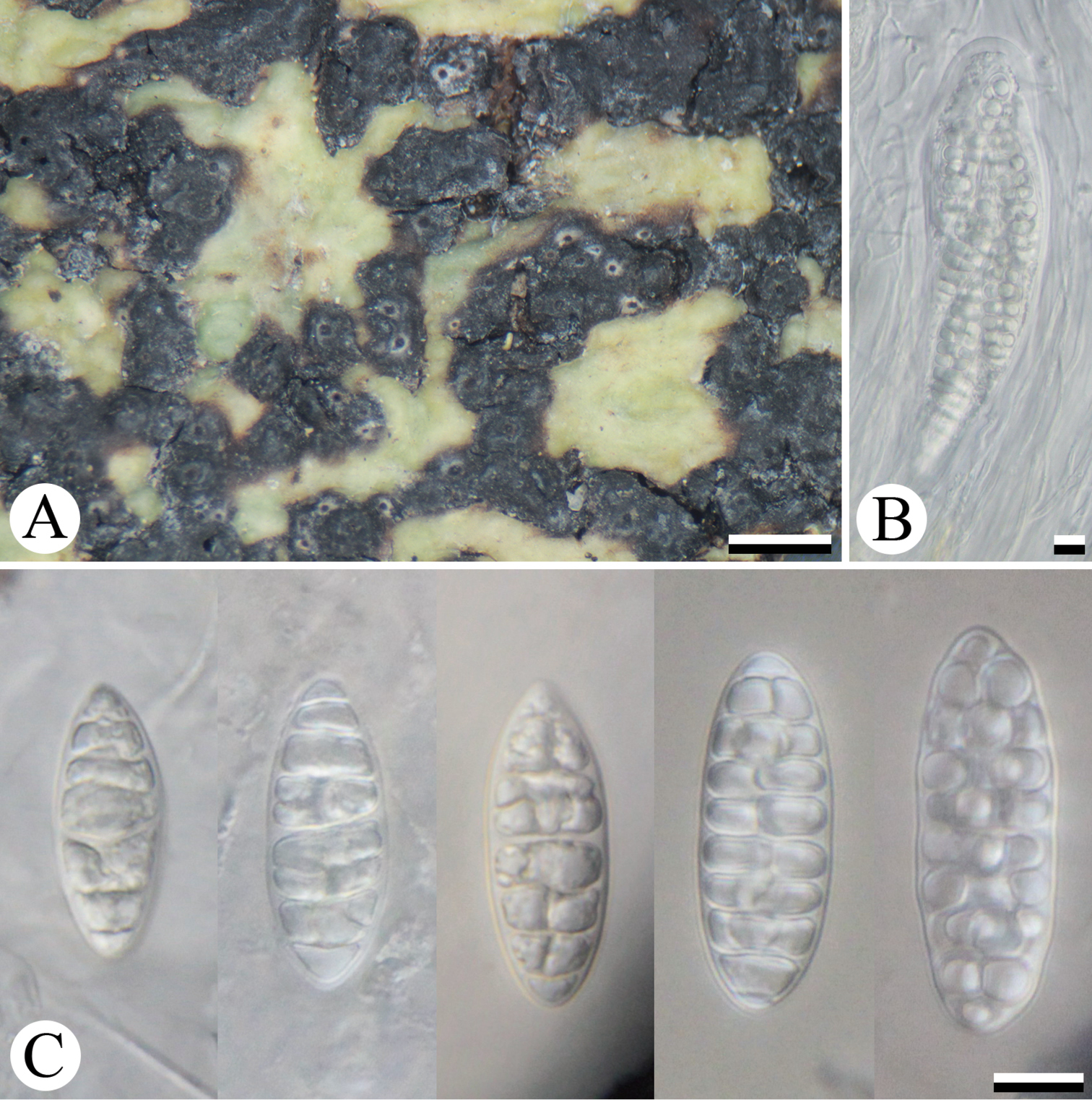
- Architrypethelium murisporum

Scientific classification
- Kingdom: Fungi
- Division: Ascomycota
- Class: Dothideomycetes
- Order: Trypetheliales
- Family: Trypetheliaceae
- Genus: Architrypethelium; Aptroot (1991)

Type species
- Architrypethelium seminudum (Mont.) Aptroot (1991)

= Architrypethelium =

Genus of lichens

Architrypethelium is a genus of lichen-forming fungi in the family Trypetheliaceae.

== Taxonomy ==
The genus was circumscribed in 1991 by the Dutch lichenologist André Aptroot, with A. seminudum assigned as the type species. It is a segregate of genus Trypethelium.

== Description ==
Architrypethelium is marked by a thallus with a protective outer layer known as the cortex. This genus has ascomata (fruiting bodies responsible for spore production) that can be found either singularly or clustered together. The ostioles are positioned either at the apex (top) or eccentrically (off-centre). Their walls consist of intertwined hyphal threads, known as textura intricata, and have a carbonised (blackened) appearance.

The hamathecium, a tissue layer inside the ascomata containing filamentous structures, is either transparent or inspersed with oil droplets. These filaments are slender and form an interwoven network known as anastomosing paraphysoids. Ascospores in Architrypethelium are typically distoseptate (having a two-part septum) and euseptate (only one wall layer is visible), predominantly brown in colour, large in size, and generally have three to five septa. These spores often have longitudinal folds in their walls and are occasionally colourless. Pycnidia, asexual reproductive structures, are not known to occur in this genus. In terms of chemical composition, the presence of lichexanthone, a xanthone compound, is rare in Architrypethelium.

Architrypethelium bears a resemblance to species in the genus Astrothelium, as well as those previously classified under Laurera, Cryptothelium, and Trypethelium. However, it distinguishes itself anatomically with its particularly large, 3-septate ascospores, which mature from hyaline (clear) to dark brown, lacking the diamond-shaped lumina typical of mature Astrothelium species. Phylogenetically, Architrypethelium is closely related to Astrothelium.

The genus Pyrenula, which includes species with large, 3-septate ascospores, may sometimes be confused with Architrypethelium. They can be differentiated by their hamathecium structure and the shape of their ascospores. For example, Pyrenula subpraelucida has ascospores with small terminal lumina against the endospore, whereas P. laii and P. montocensis have ascospores with angular lumina, thick septa, and lateral walls. Notably, 3-septate ascospores in Pyrenula are typically shorter than 90 μm, whereas in Architrypethelium, they usually exceed 90 μm in length, reaching up to 160 μm.

== Species ==
- Architrypethelium barrerae Guzm.-Guill. & Llar.-Hern. (2022) – Mexico
- Architrypethelium columbianum (Nyl.) Aptroot & Lücking (2016)
- Architrypethelium grande (Kremp.) Aptroot & Lücking (2016)
- Architrypethelium hyalinum Aptroot (2008) – Costa Rica
- Architrypethelium lauropaluanum Lücking, M.P.Nelsen & Marcelli (2016)
- Architrypethelium murisporum Luangsuph., Lumbsch & Sangvichien (2018) – Thailand
- Architrypethelium nitens (Fée) Aptroot (2008)
- Architrypethelium penuriixanthum Flakus & Aptroot (2016) – Bolivia
- Architrypethelium seminudum (Mont.) Aptroot (1991)
- Architrypethelium submuriforme Aptroot (2022) – Brazil
- Architrypethelium uberinum (Fée) Aptroot (1991)
