= Astrothelium pictum =

Scientific classification
- Kingdom: Fungi
- Division: Ascomycota
- Class: Dothideomycetes
- Order: Trypetheliales
- Family: Trypetheliaceae
- Genus: Astrothelium
- Species: A. pictum

Binomial name
- Astrothelium pictum Aptroot (2016)

Species of lichen-forming fungus

Astrothelium pictum is a species of corticolous (bark-dwelling), crustose lichen in the family Trypetheliaceae. Found in Brazil, it was formally described as a new species in 2016 by Dutch lichenologist André Aptroot. The type specimen was collected by the author from the Reserva Particular do Patrimônio Natural Santuário Caraça (Serra do Caraça, Minas Gerais) at an altitude of 1,300 m (4,300 ft); there, in an Atlantic Forest habitat, it was found growing on smooth tree bark.

The lichen has a smooth and somewhat shiny, bullate, olive-green to olive-grey thallus lacking a prothallus; it measures up to 5 cm (2 in) in diameter. The presence of the lichen induces the formation of galls in the bark of the host. The ascomata are spherical, measuring about 0.8–1.2 mm in diameter. They tend to aggregate in groups or lines of 5 to 25 in pseudostromata. The thallus contains lichexanthone, a lichen product that causes this structure to fluoresce yellow when lit with a long-wavelength UV light. The lichen also contains an anthraquinone that is detectable using thin-layer chromatography, and visible as reddish crystals in the pseudostromata. The main characteristics of the lichen that distinguish it from other members of Astrothelium include the septation and size of its ascospores (usually 5-septate and 90–115 μm long); the presence of external purplish-red pigment on the ascomata; and the laterally scattered arrangement of the ascomata along pseudostromata. Astrothelium sipmanii is somewhat similar in appearance, but, unlike A. pictum, that species has an inspersed hamathecium.

== See also ==
- List of lichens of Brazil
