= Astrothelium sipmanii =

Scientific classification
- Kingdom: Fungi
- Division: Ascomycota
- Class: Dothideomycetes
- Order: Trypetheliales
- Family: Trypetheliaceae
- Genus: Astrothelium
- Species: A. sipmanii

Binomial name
- Astrothelium sipmanii Aptroot (2016)

Species of lichen-forming fungus

Astrothelium sipmanii is a species of corticolous (bark-dwelling) lichen in the family Trypetheliaceae. It is found in Guyana and Brazil.

== Taxonomy ==
The lichen was formally described as a new species in 2016 by Dutch lichenologist André Aptroot. The type was collected by Harrie Sipman in the Upper Takutu District; here, in savannah forest, it was found growing on the smooth bark of trees. The species epithet acknowledges the collector of the type.

== Description ==
The lichen has a pale ochraceous-green thallus with a cortex; the thallus is surrounded by a thin (≤1 mm wide) black prothallus. The ascomata are pear-shaped (pyriform), measuring 0.7–1.2 mm in diameter. The ascomatal walls are carbonized (blackened) and up to about 80 μm thick; the ostioles (pores) are apically situated, black, and concave. Astrothelium sipmanii makes ellipsoid-shaped ascospores with 5 septa, measuring 100–150 by 35–40 μm. The hamathecium (i.e., all of the hyphae or other tissues between the asci) is inspersed with oil globules. No lichen products were detected in the collected specimens using thin-layer chromatography.

Astrothelium curvisporum and A. pustulatum share some similar characteristics, but can be distinguished by differences in spore shape and septation.

== Habitat and distribution ==
In addition to the type locality in Guyana, the lichen has also been recorded from Amazonas in Brazil.
