= Pyrenula biseptata =

Scientific classification
- Kingdom: Fungi
- Division: Ascomycota
- Class: Eurotiomycetes
- Order: Pyrenulales
- Family: Pyrenulaceae
- Genus: Pyrenula
- Species: P. biseptata

Binomial name
- Pyrenula biseptata Aptroot & M.Cáceres (2018)
- Holotype: Fazenda Pantera, Pará, Brazil

Species of lichen

Pyrenula biseptata is a rare species of corticolous (bark-dwelling) crustose lichen in the family Pyrenulaceae. It was formally described as a new species in 2018 by the lichenologists André Aptroot and Marcela Cáceres. This lichen is distinguished by its unique ascospores that are divided by exactly two internal cross-walls, a rare characteristic that makes it one of only two species in its genus with this feature. It grows on smooth tree bark in primary rainforest in northern Brazil and forms a thin, dark brown crust with small black, flask-shaped fruiting bodies.

== Taxonomy ==
Pyrenula biseptata was formally described in 2018 by André Aptroot and Marcela Cáceres during a survey of tropical pyrenocarpous lichens in Brazil. It is distinguished within the genus Pyrenula by its consistently 2-septate ascospores—a rare trait in both lichenised and non-lichenised fungi, as most species typically produce spores with 1 or 3 septa. This makes P. biseptata one of only two species in the genus known to possess this character; the other, P. lineatostroma, differs in having fused ascomata (pseudostromata) and a non-inspersed hamathecium.

== Description ==
Pyrenula biseptata is a crustose lichen that forms a thin, smooth, dark brown thallus. It lacks features such as pseudocyphellae (small pores or breaks in the surface) and visible deposits of crystals. The photobiont partner is a green alga from the genus Trentepohlia, commonly found in tropical lichens.

The fruiting bodies (ascomata) are perithecioid—flask-shaped structures that sit on the surface of the bark, measuring 0.2–0.4 mm in diameter. These are black, flat-topped, and often slightly elongated. The ostiole (pore through which spores are released) is located at the apex and brown in colour. Internally, the hamathecium—a tissue of sterile filaments within the fruiting body—is filled with oil droplets, giving it an inspersed appearance under the microscope.

Each ascus contains eight brown, ellipsoid ascospores that are divided by two internal cross-walls (septa), measuring 11–12 × 4.5–5.0 μm. These spores have rounded ends and contain internal chambers (lumina) that are diamond-shaped or rounded, with the terminal lumina distinctly separated from the spore wall by a layer of endospore material. No asexual reproductive structures (pycnidia or conidia) were observed. Chemical spot tests and thin-layer chromatography detected no secondary metabolites in the thallus.

== Habitat and distribution ==
This lichen has been found growing on smooth tree bark within primary lowland rainforest in Pará, northern Brazil, at roughly 120 metres elevation. It is currently known only from this locality and is considered a rare species within its genus.

== See also ==
- List of Pyrenula species
