= Architrypethelium submuriforme =

Scientific classification
- Kingdom: Fungi
- Division: Ascomycota
- Class: Dothideomycetes
- Order: Trypetheliales
- Family: Trypetheliaceae
- Genus: Architrypethelium
- Species: A. submuriforme

Binomial name
- Architrypethelium submuriforme Aptroot (2022)

Species of lichen-forming fungus

Architrypethelium submuriforme is a corticolous (bark dwelling), crustose lichen species within the family Trypetheliaceae. Discovered in Brazil's Minas Gerais region, this species thrives on tree bark within rainforests. It is distinguished from others in its genus by its unique ascospore structure.

== Taxonomy ==
Architrypethelium submuriforme was described by the Dutch lichenologist André Aptroot in 2022. The type specimen was collected in the rainforest of Catas Altas, Santuário do Caraça, Minas Gerais, Brazil, at an altitude of 1,200–1,400 m (3,900–4,600 ft). The species name, submuriforme, is derived from the Latin, referring to its submuriform ascospores, which feature a unique structure of eight main locules and 5–25 smaller locules. This species is the first within Architrypethelium to be identified with submuriform ascospores.

== Description ==
The thallus of Architrypethelium submuriforme is dull, pale ochraceous green, capable of covering areas up to 25 cm (10 in) in diameter. Its surface is bullate (blistered), featuring ellipsoid patches intermixed with linear black areas. The ascomata are mostly immersed within the thallus, revealing a single, black ostiole. Ascospores are hyaline, submuriform, containing eight main locules and 5–25 smaller locules, measuring 110–127 by 22–30 μm. The chemistry of the thallus shows no reaction to UV light or chemical tests, indicating an absence of secondary metabolites (lichen products).

== Habitat and distribution ==
Architrypethelium submuriforme is known exclusively from Brazil, particularly within the rainforests of Minas Gerais and Paraná. It is considered locally common in these areas.

== See also ==
- List of lichens of Brazil
