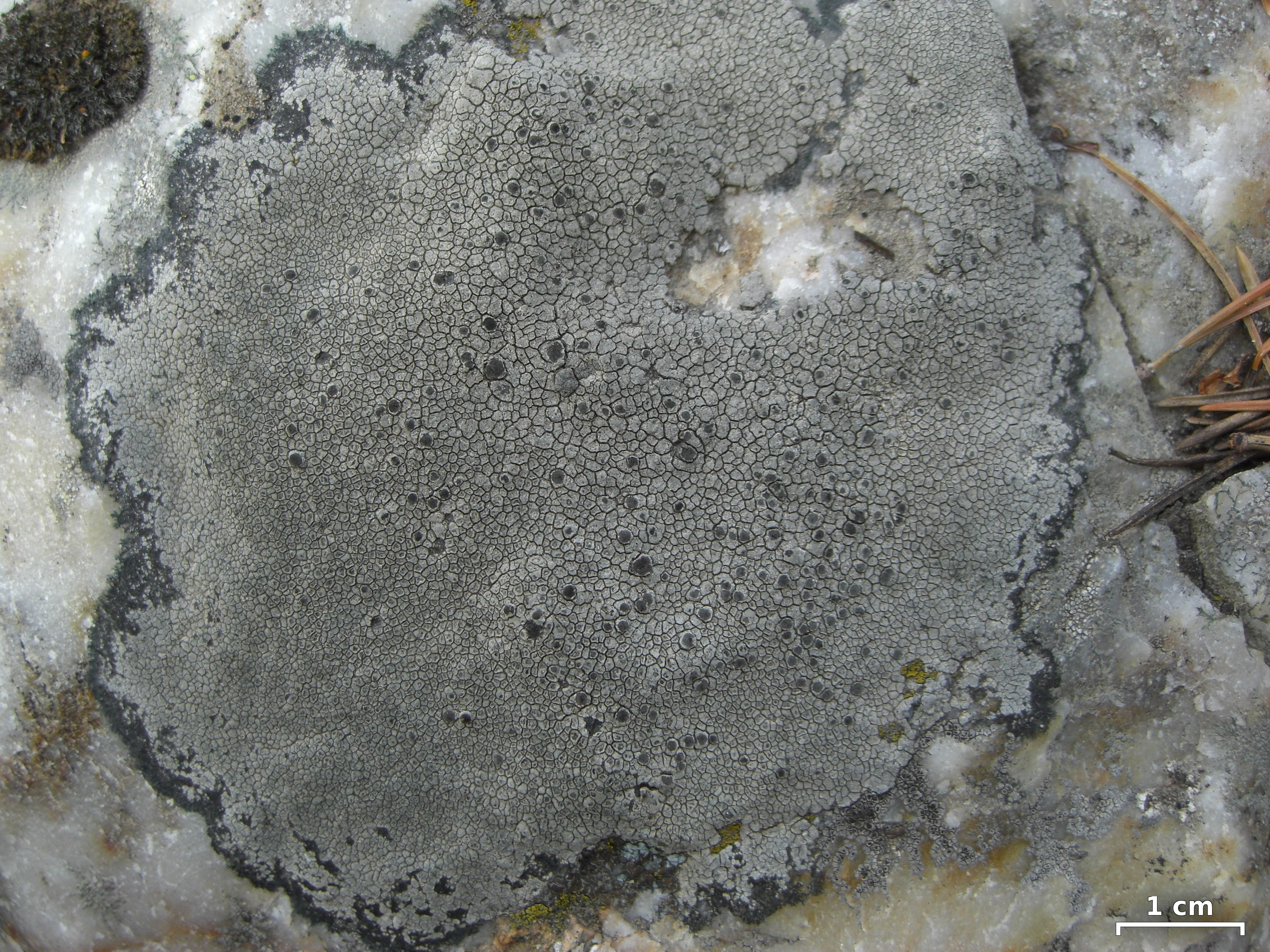
- Bellemerea alpina in Salmon-Challis National Forest

Conservation status
- Apparently Secure (NatureServe)

Scientific classification
- Domain: Eukaryota
- Kingdom: Fungi
- Division: Ascomycota
- Class: Lecanoromycetes
- Order: Lecideales
- Family: Lecideaceae
- Genus: Bellemerea
- Species: B. alpina

Binomial name
- Bellemerea alpina (Sommerf.) Clauzade & Cl.Roux (1984)

Synonyms
- Lecanora alpina Sommerf. (1826)

= Bellemerea alpina =

Species of lichen

Bellemerea alpina, the brown sunken disk lichen, is a white to pale tan, thick crustose areolate lichen that grows on rock in the mountains worldwide. It grows in arctic-alpine habitats in Eurasia, North America (south to California and Arizona), Australia, and New Zealand. Areoles are sometimes contiguous and sometimes dispersed. It often has very visible black prothallus. The brown to tan apothecia have a purplish tinge and are grayed by a pruinose coating, and embedded in the areoles, giving a similar appearance to members of the genus Aspicilia.
