= Franwilsia =

Scientific classification
- Domain: Eukaryota
- Kingdom: Fungi
- Division: Ascomycota
- Class: Lecanoromycetes
- Order: Teloschistales
- Family: Teloschistaceae
- Genus: Franwilsia; S.Y.Kondr., Kärnefelt, Elix, A.Thell & Hur (2014)

Type species
- Franwilsia bastowii (S.Y.Kondr. & Kärnefelt) S.Y.Kondr., Kärnefelt, A.Thell, Elix, J.Kim, A.S.Kondratiuk & Hur (2014)

Species
- F. bastowii F. renatae F. skottsbergii

Genus of lichens

Franwilsia is a genus of lichen-forming fungi in the family Teloschistaceae. It has three species.

== Taxonomy ==
The genus was circumscribed in 2014 by lichenologists Sergey Kondratyuk, Ingvar Kärnefelt, John Alan Elix, Arne Thell, and Jae-Seoun Hur. It contains species formerly included in the Caloplaca bastowii-group; the type species is Franwilsia bastowii. The genus is in the subfamily Caloplacoideae in the Teloschistaceae. It forms a clade along with genus Eilifdahlia. The genus name honours the reverend Francis Robert Muter Wilson, an early Australian lichenologist.

== Description ==
Franwilsia is characterized by a thallus that can either be continuous or areolate (broken into discrete areas). The cortical layer of the thallus is described as palisade plectenchymatous, meaning it consists of tightly packed cells arranged in a palisade-like formation. The colour of the thallus ranges from whitish to grey or dark grey.

The apothecia, or fruiting bodies, of Franwilsia are either zeorine or lecanorine. The subhymenium (a tissue layer beneath the spore-bearing hymenium), the lower portion of the hymenium, and the basal portion of the true exciple (the outer layer of tissue enclosing the spore-bearing layer) are densely interspersed with oil droplets or aggregations. The true exciple is leptodermatous paraplectenchymatous, indicating it is thin and made up of irregularly arranged cells.

The ascospores of Franwilsia are polarilocular, meaning they have two locules or chambers, and there are typically eight spores per ascus. The conidia, or asexual spores, range from bacilliform (rod-shaped) to narrowly bacilliform. When treated with a solution of potassium hydroxide (i.e., the K spot test), the thallus and apothecia show a purple reaction. Chemically, Franwilsia contains compounds such as depsides of the brialmontin chemosyndrome, anthraquinones of the parietin chemosyndrome, and lichexanthone, especially in the fruiting bodies of some species.

In terms of similarities, Franwilsia closely resembles the genus Mikhtomia in having a hymenium, subhymenium, and basal portion of the true exciple rich in oil droplets. However, Franwilsia is differentiated by its specific structure of the true exciple and the presence of larger, irregular oil aggregations in the subhymenium. Additionally, Franwilsia is part of the Southern Hemisphere lichen flora, contrasting with Mikhtomia, which is found in the Northern Hemisphere.

== Species ==
Three species are accepted in Franwilsia:

- Franwilsia bastowii (S.Y.Kondr. & Kärnefelt) S.Y.Kondr., Kärnefelt, Elix, A.Thell, Jung Kim, A.S.Kondr. & Hur (2014) – Australia
- Franwilsia renatae (V.Wirth & S.Y.Kondr.) S.Y.Kondr., Kärnefelt, Elix, A.Thell, Jung Kim, A.S.Kondr. & Hur (2014) – South Africa
- Franwilsia skottsbergii S.Y.Kondr., A.Thell, S.-O.Oh & Hur (2018) – Chile

A proposed Australian species Franwilsia kilcundaensis S.Y.Kondr., Kärnefelt, Elix, A.Thell, Jung Kim, A.S.Kondr. & Hur (2014) was not validly published by the authors.
