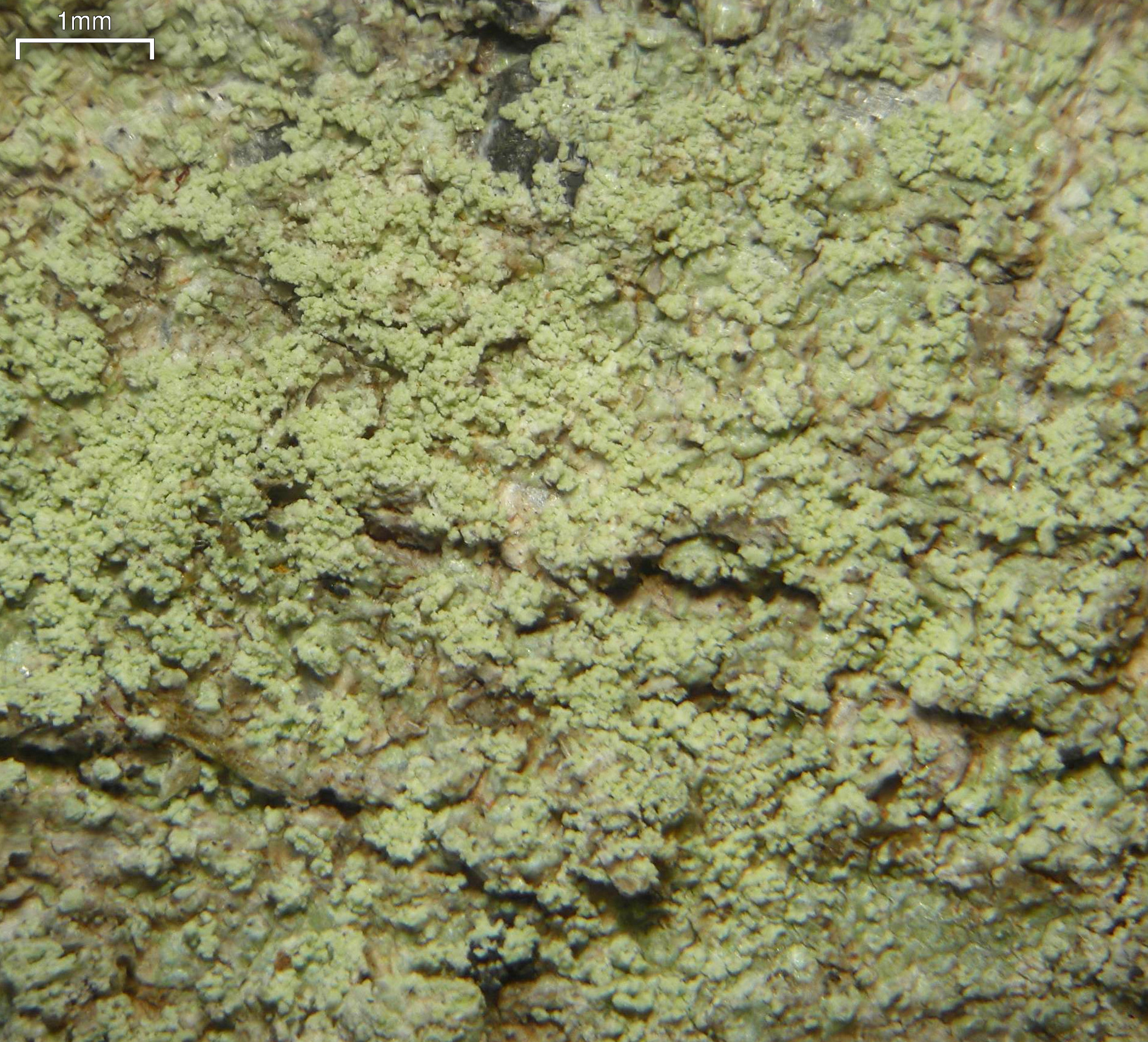
- Megalospora porphyritis on red maple

Scientific classification
- Domain: Eukaryota
- Kingdom: Fungi
- Division: Ascomycota
- Class: Lecanoromycetes
- Order: Teloschistales
- Family: Megalosporaceae
- Genus: Megalospora; Meyen (1843)

Type species
- Megalospora sulphurata Meyen (1843)

Synonyms
- Austroblastenia Sipman (1983); Bombyliospora De Not. (1852); Bombyliosporomyces Cif. & Tomas. (1953); Byssophragmia M.Choisy (1931); Dumoulinia Stein (1883); Heterothecium Flot. (1850)

= Megalospora =

Genus of fungi

Megalospora is a genus of lichen-forming fungi in the family Megalosporaceae.

== Taxonomy ==
The genus was circumscribed in 1843 by Prussian botanist Franz Meyen, with Megalospora sulphurata assigned as the type, and at that time, only species. The genus was then largely defined on the basis of the structure of the apothecia.

In 2012, Gintaras Kantvilas and H. Thorsten Lumbsch synonymized the genus Austroblastenia (which contained two species) with Megalospora, based on both morphology and molecular phylogeny.

== Description ==
Megalospora is characterised by its large, bicellar ascospores. Other features include the crustose thallus, the lecideine apothecia, and the presence of oil droplets in the hymenium. The photobiont partner is a member of the green algal genus Dictyochloropsis. Megalospora species are usually distinguished based on the type of ascospore, thallus chemistry, and the presence or absence of reproductive propagules such as isidia and soralia.

== Species ==
As of December 2021, Species Fungorum accepts 22 species of Megalospora.

- Megalospora albomarginata Untari (2006) – Java
- Megalospora atrorubricans (Nyl.) Zahlbr. (1926)
- Megalospora australiensis (Müll.Arg.) Sipman (1983)
- Megalospora austropacifica Lumbsch, Naikatini & Lücking (2011) – Fiji
- Megalospora caraibica Lücking (2007) – Jamaica
- Megalospora clandestina Kantvilas (2018) – Tasmania
- Megalospora disjuncta Sipman (1986) – New Zealand
- Megalospora flavoexcipulata Untari (2006) – Java
- Megalospora galactocarpa (Zahlbr.) Elix (2009)
- Megalospora galapagoensis Bungartz, Ziemmeck & Lücking (2011)
- Megalospora imshaugii Lücking (2007) – Jamaica
- Megalospora javanica Untari (2006) – Java
- Megalospora lopadioides Sipman (1983) – Tasmania
- Megalospora melanodermia (Müll.Arg.) Zahlbr. (1926)
- Megalospora occidentalis Kantvilas (1994) – Western Australia
- Megalospora pauciseptata (Shirley) Kantvilas & Lumbsch (2012)
- Megalospora porphyritis (Tuck.) R.C.Harris (1984)
- Megalospora pulverata Kantvilas (1994) – Tasmania
- Megalospora pupa (Sipman) Kantvilas & Lumbsch (2012)
- Megalospora queenslandica Sipman (1983)
- Megalospora reniformis (C.Knight ex Shirley) Zahlbr. (1926)
- Megalospora subtuberculosa (C.Knight) Sipman (1983)
- Megalospora sulphurata Meyen (1843) – widespread
- Megalospora tuberculosa (Fée) Sipman (1983)
