= Sipmaniella =

Scientific classification
- Domain: Eukaryota
- Kingdom: Fungi
- Division: Ascomycota
- Class: Lecanoromycetes
- Order: Teloschistales
- Family: Megalosporaceae
- Genus: Sipmaniella; Kalb (2009)
- Species: S. sulphureofusca

Binomial name
- Sipmaniella sulphureofusca (Fée) Kalb (2009)

Synonyms
- Lecania sulphureo-fusca (Fée) Müll.Arg. (1887); Lecanora sulfureo-fusca Fée (1825); Patellaria sulfureofusca (Fée) Müll.Arg. (1885)

Single-species genus of lichen

Sipmaniella is a fungal genus in the family Megalosporaceae. It is a monotypic genus, containing the single species Sipmaniella sulphureofusca, a crustose lichen found on Réunion. This species was previously named Lecanora sulfureo-fusca by French botanist Antoine Laurent Apollinaire Fée in 1825, and had also been shuffled to the genera Lecania and Patellaria in the late 1800s. The genus name honours Dutch lichenologist Harrie Sipman.
