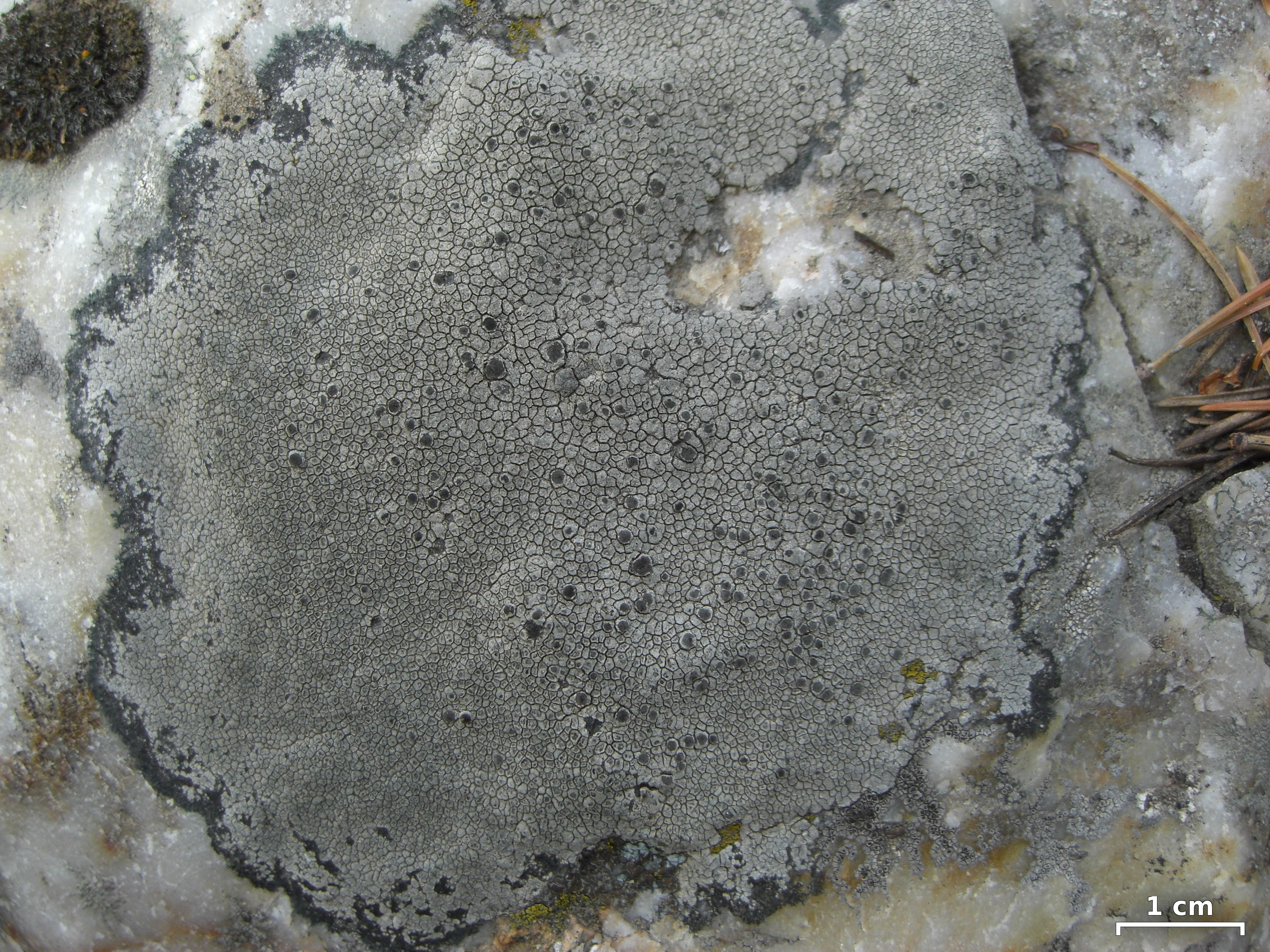
- Bellemerea alpina

Scientific classification
- Kingdom: Fungi
- Division: Ascomycota
- Class: Lecanoromycetes
- Order: Lecideales
- Family: Lecideaceae
- Genus: Bellemerea; Hafellner & Cl.Roux (1984)

Type species
- Bellemerea alpina (Sommerf.) Clauzade & Cl.Roux (1984)

Species
- B. alpina B. cinereorufescens B. diamarta B. elegans B. pullata B. subcandida B. sanguinea B. subnivea B. subsorediza

= Bellemerea =

Genus of lichen-forming fungi

Bellemerea is a genus of saxicolous (rock-dwelling) crustose lichens in the family Lecideaceae. These lichens form tough, crusty patches on hard rock surfaces, often appearing as a mosaic of small angular blocks in colours ranging from white and grey to brown. The genus includes nine species found primarily in mountainous and polar regions where they help colonize bare rock surfaces in harsh environments.

== Taxonomy ==
The genus was circumscribed in 1984 by Josef Hafellner and Claude Roux, with B. alpina as the type species. The generic name honours the French lichenologist André Bellemère (1927–2014).

== Description ==
Bellemerea species form firmly attached, crust-like colonies on hard, often siliceous rock. Seen close up, the surface is broken into angular blocks or low warts (areoles) that may be scattered or jammed tightly together. Thallus colour ranges from chalk-white through pale grey to ochre or even rusty brown, and a thin black "seam" of hyphae (the prothallus) can usually be seen edging the colony. The internal algal partner is a green chlorococcoid alga whose cells are frequently ellipsoidal; in many specimens the algal layer runs unbroken beneath the fruiting bodies. When a drop of iodine is applied, the inner white layer (medulla) turns a deep violet—an easy field test for the genus.

The sexual structures are small black discs (apothecia) that start buried in the areoles but often expand until they fill almost the whole surface of a single block. The discs are flat to shallowly cup-shaped and bordered by a wafer-thin rim of thallus tissue that seldom rises above the surface. The usual inner cup wall (proper exciple) is extremely thin or missing altogether, so the disc appears to pass straight into the surrounding crust. Under the microscope the spore layer (hymenium) is threaded by branched, cross-linked paraphyses whose tips swell slightly and carry a faint brown cap; the layer below (hypothecium) is colourless. Each club-shaped ascus contains eight smooth, colourless ascospores that are single-celled but sometimes show a faint ghost septum; a distinctive iodine-positive inner wall and a clear gelatinous envelope surround each spore. Minute, sunken pycnidia release short, rod-shaped conidia for asexual spread, and thin-layer chromatography detects norstictic acid in several members of the genus. The combination of spores with an iodine-blue perispore, colourless cup wall and colourless hypothecium distinguishes Bellemerea from superficially similar crustose genera such as Amygdalaria, Aspicilia and Porpidia.

== Species ==
As of June 2025, Species Fungorum (in the Catalogue of Life) accept nine species of Bellemerea:

- Bellemerea alpina (Sommerf.) Clauzade & Cl.Roux (1984)
- Bellemerea cinereorufescens (Ach.) Clauzade & Cl.Roux (1984)
- Bellemerea diamarta (Ach.) Hafellner & Cl.Roux (1984)
- Bellemerea elegans Øvstedal (2009)
- Bellemerea pullata (Darb.) Øvstedal (2001)
- Bellemerea sanguinea (Kremp.) Hafellner & Cl.Roux (1984)
- Bellemerea subcandida (Arnold) Hafellner & Cl.Roux (1984)
- Bellemerea subnivea (Müll.Arg.) Hafellner (2018)
- Bellemerea subsorediza (Lynge ex E.Dahl) R.Sant. (1987)
