= Remototrachyna =

Scientific classification
- Domain: Eukaryota
- Kingdom: Fungi
- Division: Ascomycota
- Class: Lecanoromycetes
- Order: Lecanorales
- Family: Parmeliaceae
- Genus: Remototrachyna; Divakar & A.Crespo (2010)

Type species
- Remototrachyna flexilis (Kurok.) Divakar & A.Crespo (2010)

Genus of fungi

Remototrachyna is a genus of foliose lichens in the large family Parmeliaceae. It was separated from the genus Hypotrachyna based on the structure of the excipulum (a cup-shaped layer of sterile tissue that contains the hymenium) and genetic differences.

== Taxonomy ==
Remototrachyna was segregated from the large genus Hypotrachyna by Pradeep Divakar and Ana Crespo in 2010, after molecular phylogenetic work showed that a group of 15 largely South and East Asian species formed a clade that was genetically distinct from the core group of Hypotrachyna. Ancestral reconstruction suggests that Remototrachyna originated in the Indian subcontinent. The genus name, which combines the Latin remoto (far apart) and Hypotrachyna, refers to its genetic distance from Hypotrachyna.

== Description ==
Diagnostic characters for Remototrachyna include lobes (measuring 2–10 mm wide) that are narrow, sublinear to linear‐elongate, truncate, and subdichotomously to dichotomously branched. Their rhizines are short, richly dichotomously branched. Marginal cilia are typically absent in this genus; when present, they are simple and in lobe axils. The hymenium measures 50–100 μm high. The outer exciple layer is a plectenchyma with very thick cell walls. Ascospores measure 10.5–21 by 6.5–13 μm. The conidia are bifusiform (resembling two adjacent spindles), and are 6 by 1 μm long.

Classes of secondary chemicals found in the medulla include orcinol depsides (gyrophoric acid), and beta‐orcinol depsidones (such as protocetraric, salazinic, norstictic, and stictic acids). The cortex contains atranorin.

== Habitat and distribution ==
Most Remototrachyna species grow on bark and rocks in tropical areas, typically at higher elevations (1,500–3,600 m (4,900–11,800 ft)). They are mostly found in humid and open areas of Southeast Asia.

== Species ==
- Remototrachyna adducta (Nyl.) Divakar, Lumbsch, Ferencová, Prado & A.Crespo (2010)
- Remototrachyna aguirrei (Sipman, Elix & T.H.Nash) Flakus, Kukwa & Sipman (2012)
- Remototrachyna awasthii (Hale & Patw.) Divakar & A.Crespo (2010)
- Remototrachyna ciliata (Sheng L.Wang, J.B.Chen & Elix) Divakar & A.Crespo (2010)
- Remototrachyna consimilis (Vain.) Flakus, Kukwa & Sipman (2012)
- Remototrachyna costaricensis (Nyl.) Divakar, Lumbsch, Ferencová, Prado & A.Crespo (2010)
- Remototrachyna crenata (Kurok.) Divakar & A.Crespo (2010)
- Remototrachyna dodapetta (Hale & Patw.) Divakar & A.Crespo (2010)
- Remototrachyna flexilis (Kurok.) Divakar & A.Crespo (2010)
- Remototrachyna incognita (Kurok.) Divakar & A.Crespo (2010)
- Remototrachyna infirma (Kurok.) A.Crespo & Divakar (2010)
- Remototrachyna kingii (Hale) Divakar & A.Crespo (2010)
- Remototrachyna koyaensis (Asahina) A.Crespo & Divakar (2010)
- Remototrachyna pandani D.M.Masson & Sérus. (2015) – Réunion
- Remototrachyna rhabdiformis (Kurok.) Divakar & A.Crespo (2010)
- Remototrachyna rigidula (Kurok.) Divakar & A.Crespo (2010)
- Remototrachyna scytophylla (Kurok.) Divakar, Lumbsch, Ferencová, Prado & A.Crespo (2010)
- Remototrachyna singularis (Hale) Flakus, Kukwa & Sipman (2012)
- Remototrachyna sipmaniana Kukwa & Flakus (2012)
- Remototrachyna thryptica (Hale) Divakar & A.Crespo (2010)

Divakar and colleagues commented that in their phylogenetic analysis, several species, including R. crenata, R. incognita, R. infirma, and R. scytophylla were not monophyletic and need further analysis to clarify their species concepts.
