= Astrochapsa sipmanii =

Scientific classification
- Domain: Eukaryota
- Kingdom: Fungi
- Division: Ascomycota
- Class: Lecanoromycetes
- Order: Graphidales
- Family: Graphidaceae
- Genus: Astrochapsa
- Species: A. sipmanii

Binomial name
- Astrochapsa sipmanii Weerakoon & Lücking (2015)

Species of lichen

Astrochapsa sipmanii is a little-known species of corticolous (bark-dwelling) lichen in the family Graphidaceae. It is found in Singapore.

== Taxonomy ==
The lichen was formally described as a new species in 2015 by Gothamie Weerakoon and Robert Lücking. The type specimen was collected by the first author from the Bukit Timah Nature Reserve at an elevation of 147 m (482 ft). It is only known to occur at the type locality. The species epithet sipmanii honours Dutch lichenologist Harrie Sipman, "for his contributions to our knowledge of Singapore lichens".

== Description ==
The lichen has a thin, olive-brown thallus up to 10 cm (4 in) in diameter, and lacks a distinct medulla. The apothecia are more or less rounded to irregular, measuring 0.4–0.7 mm in diameter. The exposed disc is grey, and covered with a thick granular pruina. Ascospores number eight per ascus; they have between 3 and 5 septa and measure 12–15 by 3–4 μm. Analysis of the lichen using chemical analyses (thin-layer chromatography and high-performance thin-layer chromatography) did not reveal the presence of any lichen products. Astrochapsa astroidea, the type species of genus Astrochapsa, is somewhat similar in appearance to A. sipmanii, but that species has neither an olive-brown thallus nor the thick apothecial pruina.
