= Remototrachyna sipmaniana =

Scientific classification
- Kingdom: Fungi
- Division: Ascomycota
- Class: Lecanoromycetes
- Order: Lecanorales
- Family: Parmeliaceae
- Genus: Remototrachyna
- Species: R. sipmaniana

Binomial name
- Remototrachyna sipmaniana Kukwa & Flakus (2012)

Species of lichen-forming fungus

Remototrachyna sipmaniana is a species of saxicolous (rock-dwelling), foliose lichen in the family Parmeliaceae. It is only known to occur in Bolivia, where it grows on boulders in Yungas mountain cloud forests.

== Taxonomy ==
Remototrachyna sipmaniana was formally described as a new species in 2012 by Martin Kukwa and Adam Flakus. The type specimen was collected by the first author in Carrasco National Park (Carrasco Province) at an altitude of 2,850 m (9,350 ft); here, in a montane cloud forest close to a river, the lichen was found growing on a rock. The specific epithet honours Dutch lichenologist Harrie Sipman, "an eminent lichenologist dealing with tropical lichens, and co-author of the monograph of the genus Hypotrachyna in the Neotropics".

== Description ==
The lichen has a leafy, gray to whitish-gray thallus measuring 10–20 cm (4–8 in) wide. The lobes comprising the thallus are typically 5–8 mm wide with a thin black rim around the margins. The medulla is white, while the thallus undersurface is shiny, smooth, and black. Black to dark brown rhizines serve as holdfasts to help attach the lichen to its substrate. On the thallus surface rest the apothecia, which are cup-shaped with a concave, light brown disc, and measure 2–5 mm wide. Ascospores are hyaline with an ellipsoid shape, and dimensions of 9.5–11 by 5.5–6 μm. Lichen products that have been detected in this species include atranorin, protocetraric acid, and gyrophoric acid as major components, and minor amounts of lecanoric acid.
