= Bellemerea elegans =

Scientific classification
- Domain: Eukaryota
- Kingdom: Fungi
- Division: Ascomycota
- Class: Lecanoromycetes
- Order: Lecideales
- Family: Lecideaceae
- Genus: Bellemerea
- Species: B. elegans

Binomial name
- Bellemerea elegans Øvstedal (2009)

Species of lichen

Bellemerea elegans is a species of saxicolous (rock-dwelling) and crustose lichen in the family Lecideaceae. Found in Antarctica, it was formally described as a new species in 2009 by Norwegian lichenologist Dag Øvstedal. The type specimen was collected from the Admiralty Bay area of King George Island. Here, at an altitude of 105 m (344 ft), it was found growing on boulders that were overgrown with the beard lichen Usnea aurantiacoatra. Bellemerea elegans is only known from the type specimen. It has a crustose, grey, areolate thallus measuring 1–2 cm (0.4–0.8 in) wide. Its apothecia are more or less immersed in the thallus (aspicilioid), measuring up to 1.1 in diameter, with a dull brown disc. Ascospores number eight per ascus, and measure 12–14 by 5–7 μm. The lichen contains porphyrilic acid, a lichen product.
