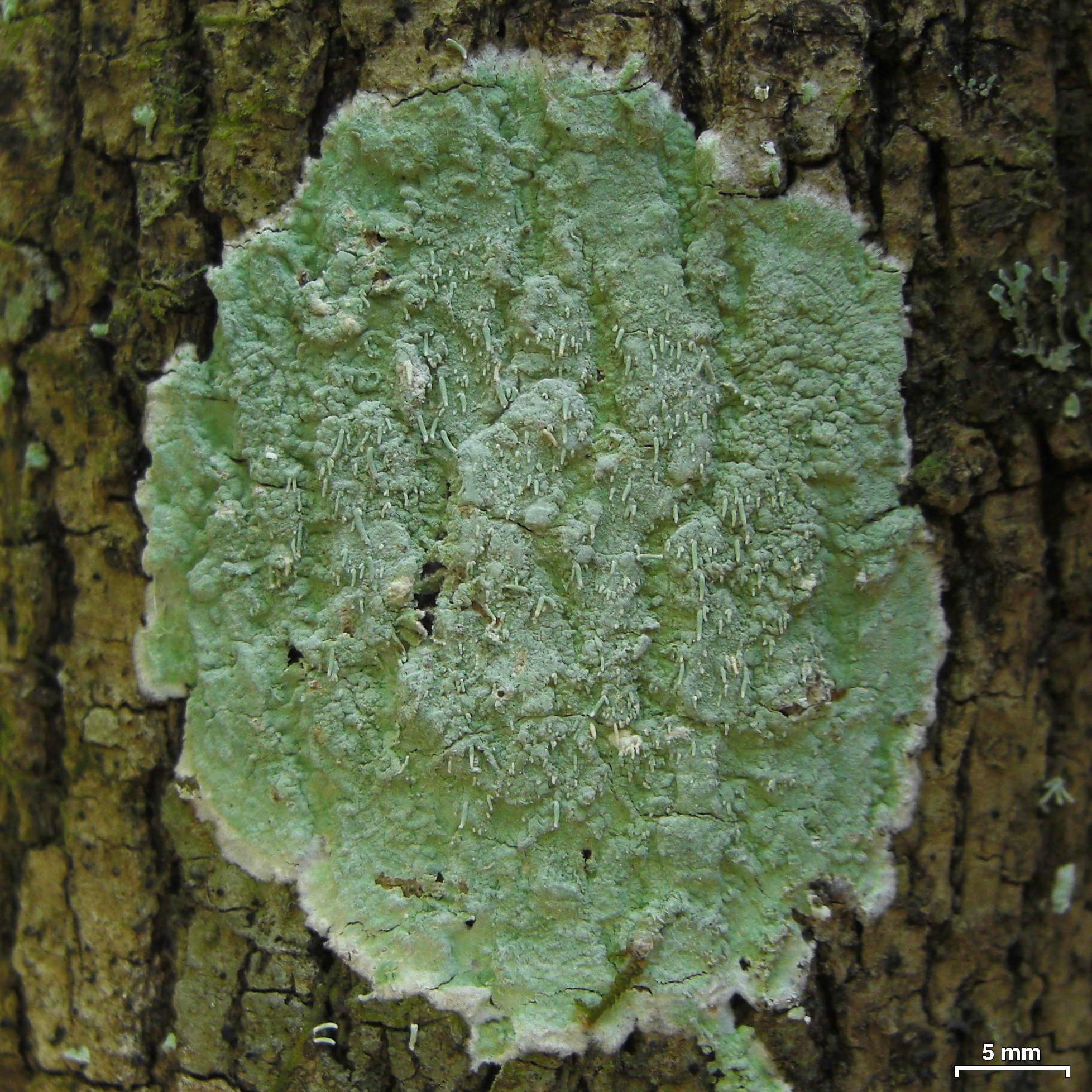
- Heiomasia seaveyorum

Scientific classification
- Kingdom: Fungi
- Division: Ascomycota
- Class: Lecanoromycetes
- Order: Graphidales
- Family: Graphidaceae
- Genus: Heiomasia; Nelsen, Lücking & Rivas Plata (2010)

Type species
- Heiomasia sipmanii (Aptroot, Lücking & Rivas Plata) Nelsen, Lücking & Rivas Plata (2010)

Species
- H. annamariae H. pallescens H. seaveyorum H. siamensis H. sipmanii

= Heiomasia =

Genus of fungi

Heiomasia is a genus of corticolous (bark-dwelling), crustose lichens in the family Graphidaceae. It has five species.

== Taxonomy ==
The genus was circumscribed in 2010 by Matthew Nelsen, Robert Lücking and Eimy Rivas Plata, with Heiomasia sipmanii assigned as the type species. This species, found in Thailand and the Philippines, was first described as Herpothallon sipmanii. Molecular phylogenetic analysis showed that it, along with another then-undescribed species, H. seaveyorum, formed a clade with a distinct lineage in the Graphidaceae, and so Heiomasia was created to contain them. The genus name honours Harrie Sipman, "recognizing his substantial contributions to tropical lichenology". The name is constructed from letters of his full name: Henricus Johannes Maria Sipman (with the "J" changed to "I").

== Description ==
Heiomasia species have pale green to whitish thalli that are effuse (spread out) and byssoid (wispy, like cotton), and often have a white prothallus. A major characteristic of the genus is the presence of large sausage-shaped or disc-shaped isidia-like structures. Lichen products found in Heiomasia are protocetraric acid, hypoprotocetraric acid, and metabolically related satellite compounds.

Morphologically, Heiomasia resembles species in Cryptothecia, Herpothallon, and Dichosporidium, but those genera are in the order Arthoniales and are not closely related.

== Species ==
Klaus Kalb published a key to the five known Heiomasia species in 2020.

- Heiomasia annamariae Kalb (2020)
- Heiomasia pallescens Jagad.Ram (2013) – Andaman Islands
- Heiomasia seaveyorum Nelsen & Lücking (2010) – Florida, USA
- Heiomasia siamensis Kalb (2020) – Malaysia
- Heiomasia sipmanii (Aptroot, Lücking & Rivas Plata) Nelsen, Lücking & Rivas Plata (2010) – Philippines; Thailand
