= Pyrenula lineatostroma =

Scientific classification
- Kingdom: Fungi
- Division: Ascomycota
- Class: Eurotiomycetes
- Order: Pyrenulales
- Family: Pyrenulaceae
- Genus: Pyrenula
- Species: P. lineatostroma

Binomial name
- Pyrenula lineatostroma Aptroot (1997)
- Holotype: Varirata, New Guinea

Species of lichen

Pyrenula lineatostroma is a species of corticolous (bark-dwelling) crustose lichen in the family Pyrenulaceae. Described as a new species in 1997 by André Aptroot, it is found in the Central Province of Papua New Guinea. The type specimen was collected by Aptroot in Varirata, from a tree in a secondary forest. It also occurs in Brazil, French Guiana, India, and Thailand.

The thallus varies from whitish to brown in colour, and lacks pseudocyphellae (small pores for gas exchange). The perithecia (fruiting bodies) are immersed within narrow, black, linear pseudostromata measuring 50–80 micrometres (μm) in width. The ascospores are two-celled and shaped like small tears or pears, with dimensions of 8–10 × 4–5 μm. Characteristics that distinguish this species from others in the genus include its 2-septate ascopores and symmetrical spore septation.

According to Aptroot, Melanotheca indica Nyl. (1867), Pyrenula subindica Upreti (1998), and Melanotheca indica var. vaga Nyl. (1867) are synonyms of Pyrenula lineatostroma.

== See also ==
- List of Pyrenula species
