= Astrothelium curvisporum =

Scientific classification
- Kingdom: Fungi
- Division: Ascomycota
- Class: Dothideomycetes
- Order: Trypetheliales
- Family: Trypetheliaceae
- Genus: Astrothelium
- Species: A. curvisporum

Binomial name
- Astrothelium curvisporum Aptroot & M.Cáceres (2016)

Species of lichen-forming fungus

Astrothelium curvisporum is a species of corticolous (bark-dwelling), crustose lichen in the family Trypetheliaceae. Found in Brazil, it was formally described as a new species in 2016 by lichenologists André Aptroot and Marcela Cáceres. The type specimen was collected by the authors in the Parque Natural Municipal de Porto Velho (Porto Velho, Rondônia), in a primary rainforest. The lichen has a smooth and somewhat shiny, olive-green to olive-brown thallus that lacks a prothallus and covers areas of up to 5 cm (2 in) in diameter. The presence of the lichen does not induce the formation of galls in the host. The ascomata are more or less spherical (globose), measuring 0.8–1.2 mm in diameter, and typically occur in groups of 3 to 15, usually immersed in pseudostromata. The species epithet curvisporum refers to the curved ascospores (measuring 115–135 by 29–36 μm), which have five septa that divide the spore into distinct compartments. The spores have a thick gelatinous layer that is 17–22 μm thick. No lichen products were detected in collected samples of the species using thin-layer chromatography. The characteristics that distinguish A. curvisporum from other members of Astrothelium include its grouped ascomata and its curved ascospores.

== See also ==
- List of lichens of Brazil
