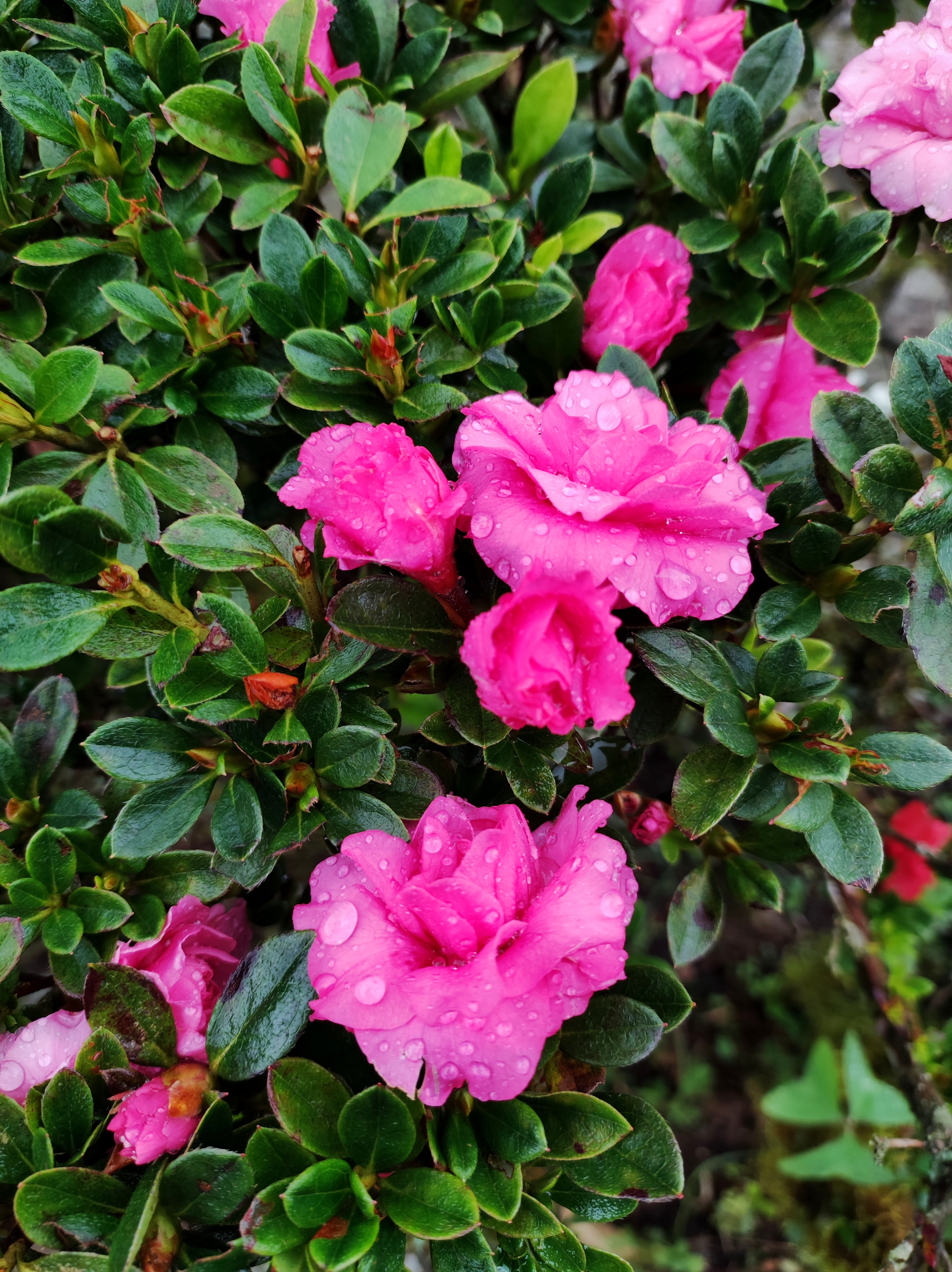

Scientific classification
- Kingdom: Plantae
- Clade: Tracheophytes
- Clade: Angiosperms
- Clade: Eudicots
- Clade: Asterids
- Order: Ericales
- Family: Ericaceae
- Genus: Rhododendron
- Species: R. simsii

Binomial name
- Rhododendron simsii Planch.

Synonyms
- Euodia confusa Merr.; Azalea indica var. simsii (Planch.) L.H. Bailey; Rhododendron breynii Planch.; Rhododendron danielsianum Planch.; Rhododendron decumbens D. Don ex G. Don; Rhododendron hannoense Nakai; Rhododendron indicum (L.) Sweet (Satsuki azalea); Rhododendron lateritium Planch.; Rhododendron macranthum (Bunge) G. Don

= Rhododendron simsii =

Species of plant

Rhododendron simsii (杜鵑) is a rhododendron species native to East Asia, where it grows at altitudes of 500–2,700 m (1,600–8,900 ft).

== Description ==
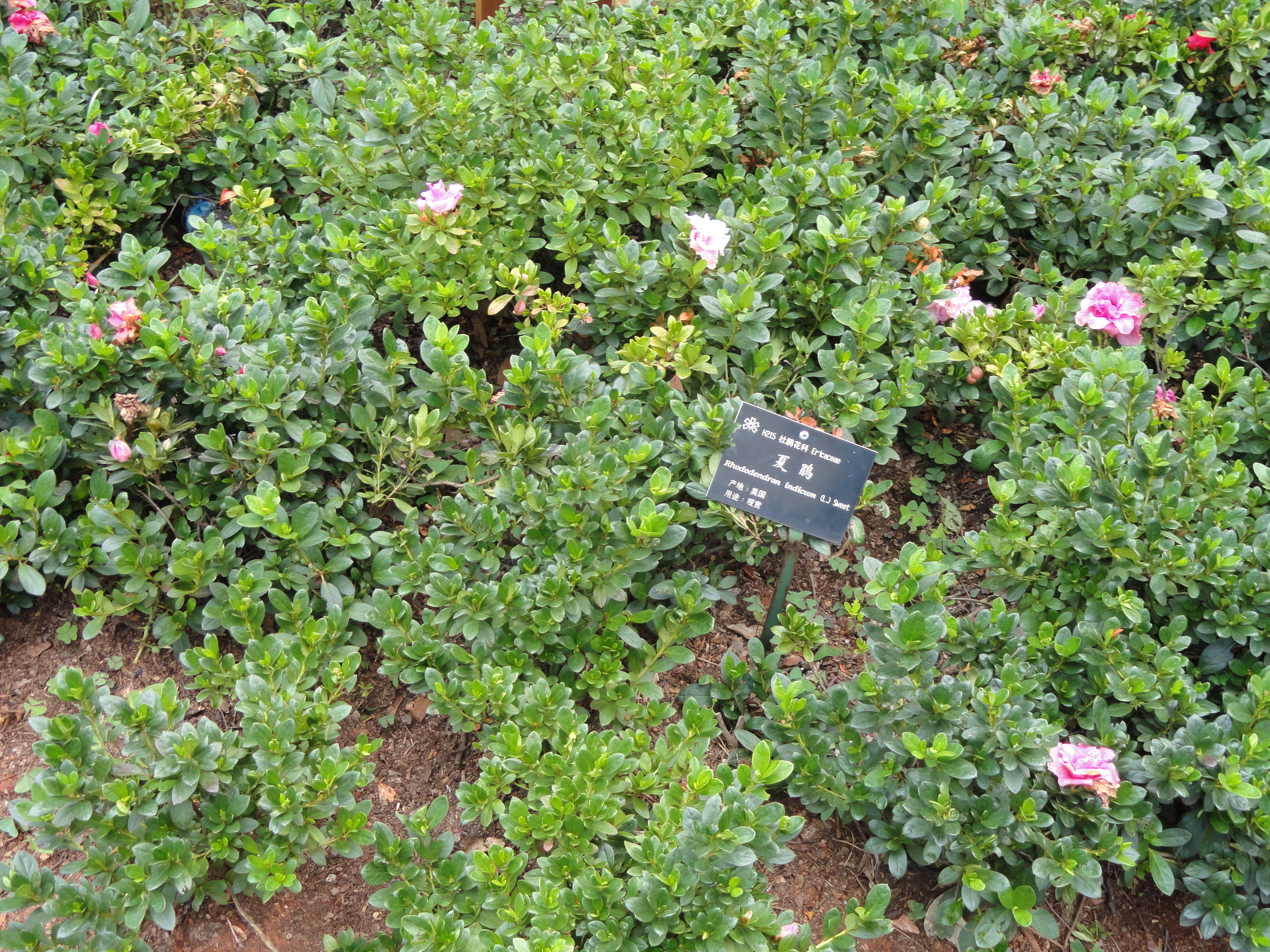
Rhododendron simsii in Kunming Botanical Garden

It is a twiggy evergreen or semi-evergreen shrub growing to 2 m (6.6 ft) in height, with leaves that are ovate, elliptic-ovate or obovate to oblanceolate, 1.5–5 by 0.5–3 cm in size. The flowers range from white to dark red. Some varieties of Rhododendron simsii are poisonous due to the presence of grayanotoxin.

== Distribution ==
The species is common in Hong Kong. It is also distributed in Areas south of Yangtze in China as well as in Vietnam and Thailand.

The specific name simsii commemorates John Sims (1749-1831) who was the first editor of "Magazine Botanique".

This slightly tender species is quite rare in the west, though well known in Chinese gardens.
