= Franwilsia bastowii =

Scientific classification
- Kingdom: Fungi
- Division: Ascomycota
- Class: Lecanoromycetes
- Order: Teloschistales
- Family: Teloschistaceae
- Genus: Franwilsia
- Species: F. bastowii

Binomial name
- Franwilsia bastowii (S.Y.Kondr. & Kärnefelt) S.Y.Kondr., Kärnefelt, Elix, A.Thell, Jung Kim, A.S.Kondr. & Hur (2009)
- Holotype site: Mornington, Victoria

Synonyms
- Caloplaca bastowii S.Y.Kondr. & Kärnefelt (2009)

Species of lichen

Franwilsia bastowii is a species of ramicolous (twig-dwelling), crustose lichen in the family Teloschistaceae. Found in Australia, it was formally described as a new species in 2009 by lichenologists Sergey Kondratyuk and Ingvar Kärnefelt. It was transferred to the genus Franwilsia in 2014. The species epithet bastowii honours the Scottish naturalist Richard Austin Bastow, who collected the type specimen in Mornington (Gippsland plain) in 1901. The lichen is known to occur in Western Australia, South Australia, and Victoria, where it grows on the twigs of various shrubs and trees.
