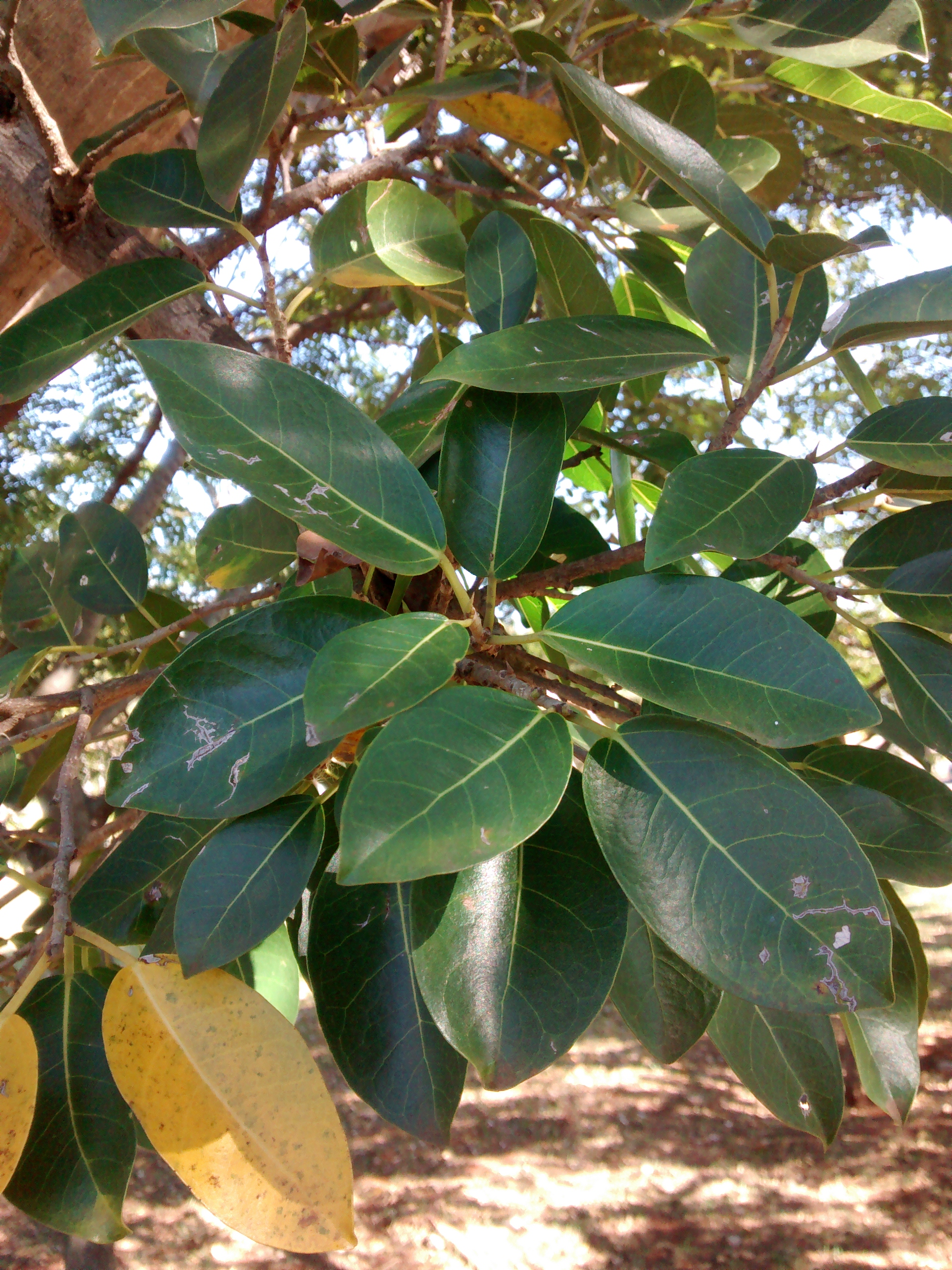
- Branchlet with leaves.

Conservation status
- Least Concern (IUCN 3.1)

Scientific classification
- Kingdom: Plantae
- Clade: Tracheophytes
- Clade: Angiosperms
- Clade: Eudicots
- Clade: Rosids
- Order: Rosales
- Family: Moraceae
- Genus: Ficus
- Subgenus: F. subg. Urostigma
- Species: F. pertusa

Binomial name
- Ficus pertusa L.f.

Synonyms
- Synonymy: Ficus arbutifolia Pers.; Ficus arpazusa Casar.; Ficus baccata (Liebm.) Miq.; Ficus cerasifolia Kunth & C.D.Bouché; Ficus ciliolosa Kunth & C.D.Bouché; Ficus complicata Kunth; Ficus daphniphylla Miq.; Ficus elliptica (Herzog) Herter; Ficus erythrosticta (Miq.) Miq.; Ficus fasciculata S.Watson; Ficus garcesii Dugand; Ficus gardeniifolia Miq.; Ficus gemina (Miq.) Miq.; Ficus grabhamii Britton ex Fawc. & Rendle; Ficus halliana Britton ex Fawc. & Rendle; Ficus ibapohi Orb. ex Rojas Acosta; Ficus immersa Warb. ex Glaz.; Ficus kanukuensis Standl.; Ficus lancifolia Hook. & Arn.; Ficus morantensis Britton ex Fawc. & Rendle; Ficus myrtifolia Link; Ficus ochroleuca Griseb.; Ficus padifolia Kunth; Ficus palmicida Pittier; Ficus peruviana (Miq.) Rossberg; Ficus polypus Schiede ex Miq.; Ficus prinoides var. subtriplinervia (Mart.) Kuntze; Ficus radicans Casar.; Ficus rolandri (Liebm.) Miq.; Ficus sapida (Liebm.) Miq.; Ficus sonorae S.Watson; Ficus subtriplinervia Mart.; Ficus sulcipes (Miq.) Miq.; Ficus tapajozensis Standl.; Ficus turbinata (Liebm.) Miq.; Ficus zarzalensis Standl.; Pharmacosycea laurifolia Miq.; Pharmacosycea peruviana Miq.; Urostigma arbutifolium (Pers.) Miq.; Urostigma baccatum Liebm.; Urostigma cestrifolium var. major Miq.; Urostigma complicatum (Kunth) Liebm.; Urostigma erythrostictum Miq.; Urostigma geminum Miq.; Urostigma lancifolium Miq.; Urostigma padifolium (Kunth) Liebm.; Urostigma populneum f. mexicanum Miq.; Urostigma rolandri Liebm.; Urostigma sapidum Liebm.; Urostigma subtriplinervium (Mart.) Miq.; Urostigma subtriplinervium f. ellipticum Herzog; Urostigma subtriplinervium f. major Miq.; Urostigma sulcipes Miq.; Urostigma turbinatum Liebm.

= Ficus pertusa =

Species of fig

Ficus pertusa is a species of tree in the family Moraceae. It is native to Mexico, Central America, and tropical South America.

== Description ==
Trees up to 25 m tall. Leaves lanceolate, elliptic or ovate, with acuminate or acute apex. Figs edible, globose, 0.8-1.2 cm in diameter.
