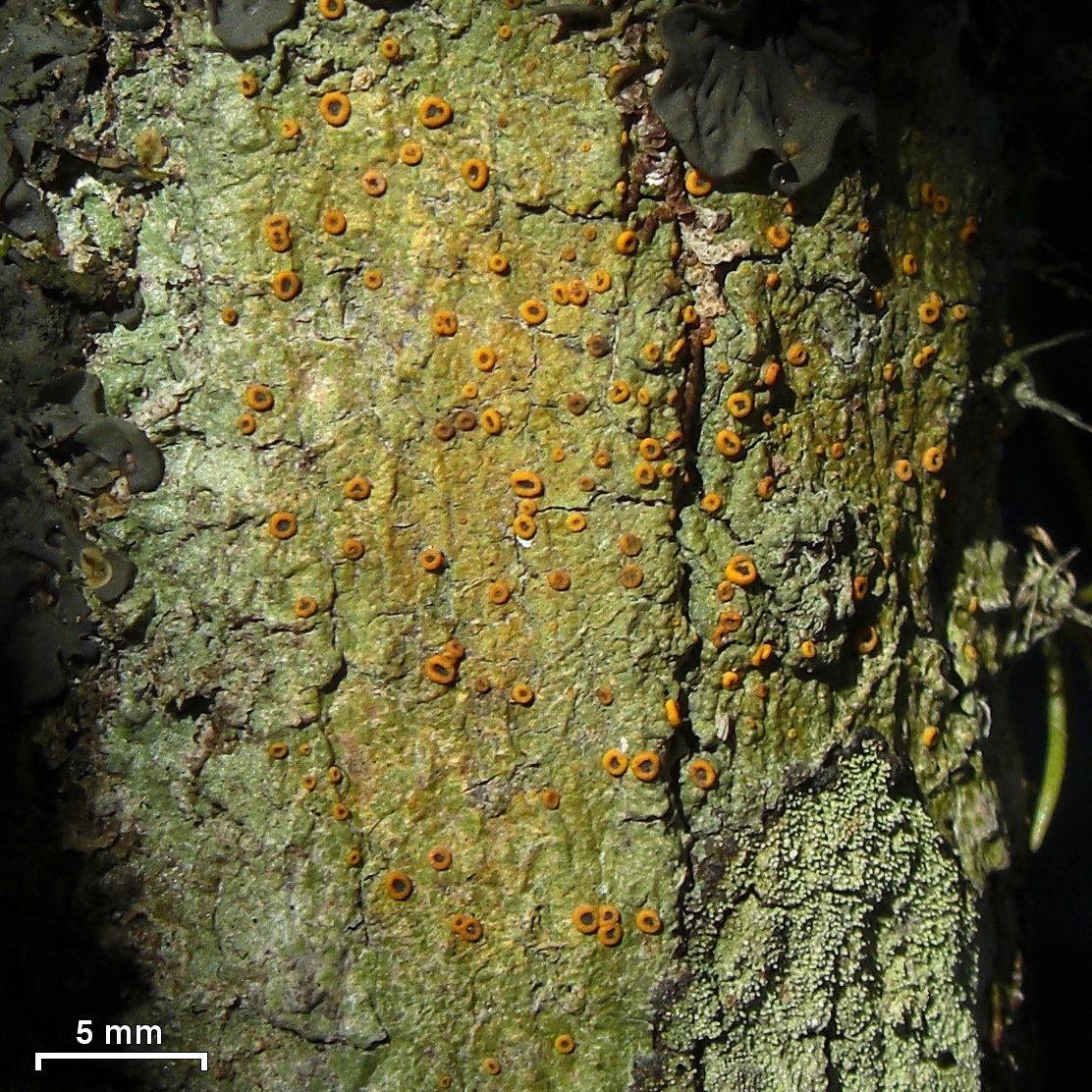
- Letrouitia domingensis

Scientific classification
- Kingdom: Fungi
- Division: Ascomycota
- Class: Lecanoromycetes
- Order: Teloschistales
- Family: Letrouitiaceae; Bellem. & Hafellner (1982)
- Genus: Letrouitia; Hafellner & Bellem. (1982)

Type species
- Letrouitia domingensis (Pers.) Hafellner & Bellem. (1982)

= Letrouitiaceae =

Genus of fungi

The Letrouitiaceae are a family of lichen-forming fungi belonging to the order Teloschistales. The family, which has a tropical and subtropical distribution, contains the single genus Letrouitia, which contains about 15 species. The family and the genus, both circumscribed in 1982 by André Bellemère and Josef Hafellner, are named in honour of Marie-Agnès Letrouit-Galinou.

== Species ==
- Letrouitia assamana S.Y.Kondr., G.K.Mishra & D.K.Upreti (2020)
- Letrouitia aureola (Tuck.) Hafellner & Bellem. (1982)
- Letrouitia bifera (Nyl.) Hafellner (1983)
- Letrouitia corallina (Müll.Arg.) Hafellner (1983)
- Letrouitia coralloidea (Müll.Arg.) Hafellner (1983)
- Letrouitia domingensis (Pers.) Hafellner & Bellem. (1982)
- Letrouitia flavidula (Tuck.) Hafellner (1983)
- Letrouitia flavocrocea (Nyl.) Hafellner & Bellem. (1982)
- Letrouitia hafellneri S.Y.Kondr. & Elix (2008)
- Letrouitia leprolyta (Nyl.) Hafellner (1983)
- Letrouitia leprolytoides S.Y.Kondr. & Elix (2008)
- Letrouitia magenta A.H.Ekanayaka & K.D.Hyde (2019)
- Letrouitia muralis Hafellner (1983)
- Letrouitia parabola (Nyl.) R.Sant. & Hafellner (1982)
- Letrouitia pseudomuralis Hafellner (1983)
- Letrouitia spiralis Hafellner (1983)
- Letrouitia subvulpina (Nyl.) Hafellner (1983)
- Letrouitia transgressa (Malme) Hafellner & Bellem. (1983)
- Letrouitia vulpina (Tuck.) Hafellner & Bellem. (1982)
