= Cladonia sipmanii =

Scientific classification
- Domain: Eukaryota
- Kingdom: Fungi
- Division: Ascomycota
- Class: Lecanoromycetes
- Order: Lecanorales
- Family: Cladoniaceae
- Genus: Cladonia
- Species: C. sipmanii

Binomial name
- Cladonia sipmanii Ahti (2000)

Species of lichen

Cladonia sipmanii is a species of fruticose lichen in the family Cladoniaceae. Found in Guyana, it was formally described as a new species in 2000 by Finnish lichenologist Teuvo Ahti. The type specimen was collected by the author from Demerara-Mahaica region; it also occurs in the Guayana Region of Venezuela. It grows in sandy soil and on sandstone; typical habitat includes coastal savannahs. Thamnolic acid, barbatic acid, and 4-O-demethylbarbatic acid are lichen products that have been isolated from this species.

== See also ==
- List of Cladonia species
