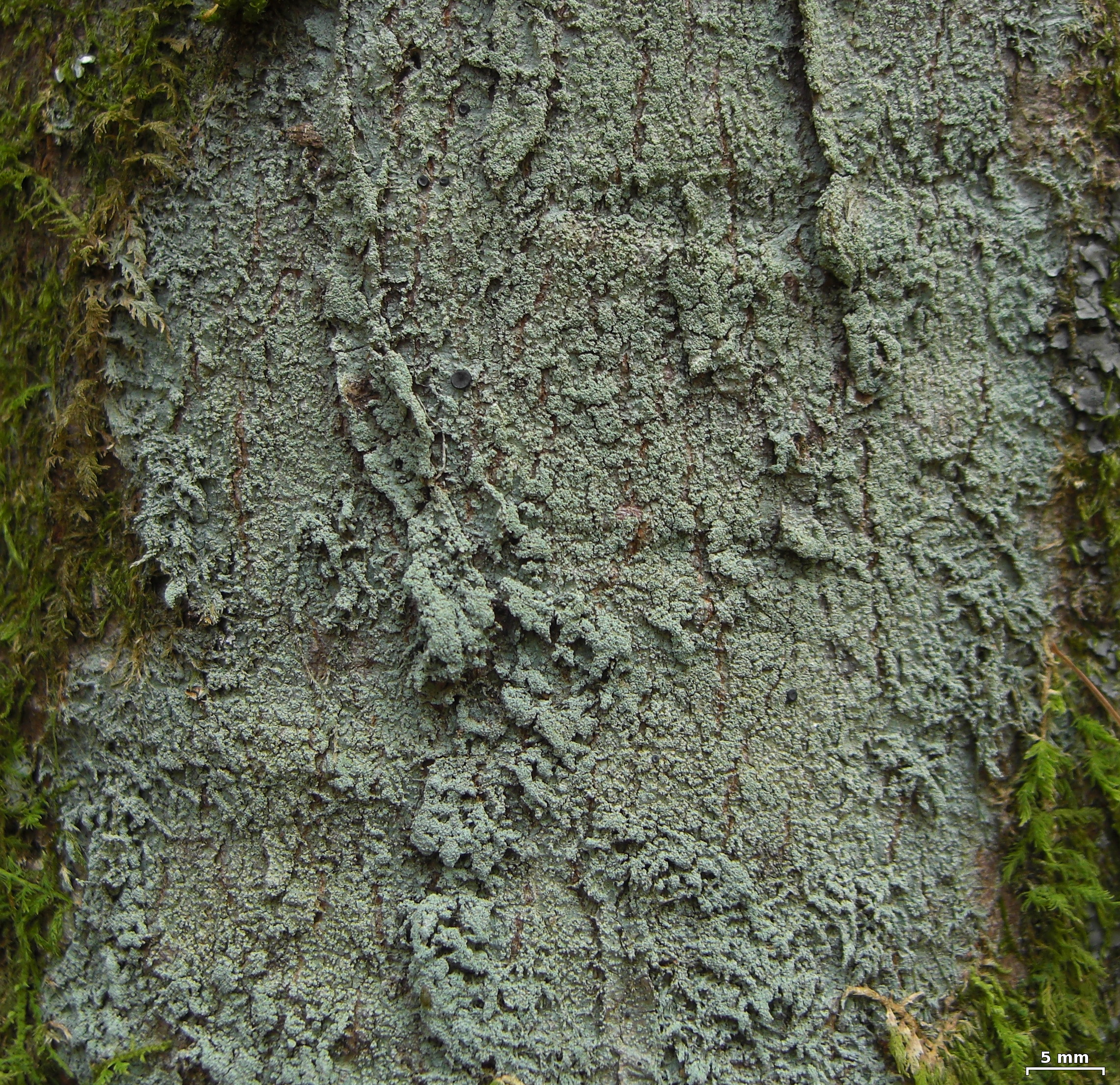
- Megalospora porphyritis

Scientific classification
- Kingdom: Fungi
- Division: Ascomycota
- Class: Lecanoromycetes
- Order: Teloschistales
- Family: Megalosporaceae; Vĕzda ex Hafellner & Bellem. (1982)

Genera
- Megaloblastenia; Megalospora; Sipmaniella

= Megalosporaceae =

Family of fungi

The Megalosporaceae are a family of mostly lichen-forming fungi belonging to the class Lecanoromycetes in the division Ascomycota. The family comprises three genera and roughly forty described species, distributed mainly in humid temperate to tropical forests of the Southern Hemisphere.

== Taxonomy ==
The family Megalosporaceae was informally proposed by Antonín Vězda in 1974 and formally validated by Josef Hafellner and André Bellemère in 1982, largely on the distinctive structure of the asci (the so-called Megalospora type, with a thick, uniformly amyloid tholus and an intensely amyloid outer coat). Their concept excluded several look-alike crustose genera (e.g. Catinaria, Psorothecopsis) that lack this ascus form. Subsequent monographic work by Harrie Sipman (1983) stabilised the family around three genera—Megalospora, Austroblastenia and Megaloblastenia—and showed that spore septation patterns, together with secondary chemistry, provide the main infrageneric characters.

A broad molecular re-assessment using various genetic markers confirmed that the family itself is a well-supported lineage within Teloschistales and is the sister group of Teloschistaceae. The same study upheld Megaloblastenia as a separate genus—distinguished by its non-inspersed hymenium and relatively small, polarilocular spores—but showed Austroblastenia to be paraphyletic and nested inside Megalospora. As a result, Austroblastenia was reduced to synonymy and its species transferred to Megalospora. All taxa share a crustose thallus with the green alga Symbiochloris, large lecideine to biatorine apothecia with a persistent proper margin, and zeorin plus either pannarin-series compounds, usnic acid, or (rarely) lichexanthone as constant chemical markers.

== Description ==
Members of the Megalosporaceae form rock- or bark-adhering crusts (crustose thalli) that spread as thin, paint-like layers. They partner exclusively with the green algal genus Symbiochloris, whose tiny spherical cells are embedded throughout the fungal tissue and supply the lichen with carbohydrates produced via photosynthesis. Sexual fruit-bodies are open discs (apothecia) that range from pure black with no thallus rim (lecideine) to versions that retain a pale inner rim derived from the exciple (biatorine). A true thalline margin—the thickened ring of host tissue encircling the disc in many lichens—is absent. Instead, a robust fungal wall (exciple) stays in place as the apothecium ages, and its upper surface is often dusted with a fine frost-like bloom (pruina).

Microscopically the spore-producing layer (hymenium) is frequently flecked with oil droplets, while the supporting filaments (paraphyses) are thread-thin, only sparingly branched, and join back together in a loose net without swelling at their tips. Each club-shaped ascus has a strongly iodine-positive (amyloid) cap (tholus) that shows no internal zoning and is sometimes crowned by a short conical chamber. A second intensely amyloid sheath coats the outside of the ascus, and between two and eight large ascospores mature inside. These spores vary from a single central division (1-septate) through several transverse partitions to a brick-walled (muriform) pattern of both transverse and longitudinal walls; some species thicken the spore walls further. Chemical spot tests and thin-layer chromatography reveal a consistent suite of secondary metabolites: most taxa contain the triterpenoid compound zeorin together with either the pannarin group of depsidones or usnic acid, while one known species produces lichexanthone instead.
