= André Bellemère =

French lichenologist and mycologist (1927–2014)

- Born: 23 September 1927; Triel-sur-Seine, France
- Died: 2 June 2014 (aged 86); Auriac-l'Église, Cantal, France
- Education: École normale supérieure de Saint-Cloud
- Known for: Research on the development and ultrastructure of asci and ascomata in ascomycetes
- Awards: Prix Coincy; Ordre des Palmes académiques (officer); Ordre national du Mérite (knight)
- Scientific career
- Fields: Mycology, lichenology
- Workplaces: École normale supérieure de Saint-Cloud
- Thesis: Contribution à l'étude du développement de l’apothécie chez les discomycètes inoperculés (1967)
- Doctoral advisor: Marius Chadefaud
- Author abbrev. (botany): Bellem.

André Bellemère (23 September 1927 – 2 June 2014) was a French mycologist and lichenologist whose research on the development and ultrastructure of ascomycete asci and ascomata influenced late 20th-century fungal systematics. A long-serving professor at the École normale supérieure de Saint-Cloud, he combined teacher training with laboratory research and helped introduce routine electron microscopy into ascomycete taxonomy. He was also a leading figure in French lichenology as president of the Association française de lichénologie, compiler of extensive bibliographies of lichenological literature, and eponym of several genera and species of lichens and lichenicolous fungi.

== Early life and education ==
Bellemère was born on 23 September 1927 in Triel-sur-Seine, in the French department of Yvelines. He first studied at the École normale primaire in Auteuil, Paris, then continued his secondary education at the Lycée Turgot, where the botanist and mycologist Marius Chadefaud was among his teachers.

In 1948 he entered the École normale supérieure de Saint-Cloud, one of France's teacher-training grandes écoles. After passing the competitive agrégation examination in natural sciences and completing military service in the Paris region, he began his career as a secondary-school teacher in Beauvais and Orléans.

== Academic career ==
In 1955 Bellemère returned to the École normale supérieure de Saint-Cloud as a professor, charged with setting up a new programme to prepare students for the natural sciences agrégation. He spent the rest of his career there, eventually becoming director of the laboratories of natural sciences, and retired from the post in 1989.

Through lectures, well-supplied botany demonstrations, and a programme of excursions, study tours and residential courses, Bellemère trained several generations of French teachers and future academics. Colleagues remembered his careful organisation of teaching laboratories and his attention to practical field skills for students preparing for careers in biology and natural history.

== Research on ascomycetes ==
Under Chadefaud's supervision Bellemère undertook a wide-ranging study of the development of apothecia in inoperculate discomycetes. His doctorat d'État, defended in 1967 and published the following year in the Bulletin de la Société mycologique de France, examined the ontogeny of apothecia in 41 species and distinguished two main developmental types, which he termed discostromian and discopodian, each with several subtypes.

Using a second-hand instrument, he established an electron-microscopy facility at Saint-Cloud and redirected his research towards the ultrastructure of the ascus: the apical apparatus, the ascus wall, the ascospore wall and the mechanism of dehiscence. These investigations confirmed and refined many of the optical-microscopy observations made earlier by Chadefaud and his school, and provided new characters for the classification of ascomycetes, both lichenised and non-lichenised.

Bellemère extended this approach to lichen-forming fungi, working in particular on genera such as Caloplaca, Acarospora and various lichenicolous (lichen-dwelling) fungi. Collaborations with researchers including Josef Hafellner, Ove Eriksson, David Leslie Hawksworth, Gerhard Rambold, Dagmar Triebel, Arne Thell, Johannes van Brummelen, and Gerard J.M. Verkley made his Saint-Cloud laboratory a centre for ultrastructural studies of ascomycete asci and ascospores, and he trained visiting mycologists from countries such as Austria, the Netherlands and Sweden.

After formal retirement Bellemère remained scientifically active. In May 1993 he co-presided over the First International Workshop on Ascomycete Systematics in Paris, which brought together around 140 participants from 24 countries; he gave one lecture on the use of asci and ascospores in ascomycete taxonomy and another, co-authored with former colleagues, on Chadefaud's influence on ascomycete systematics. His later publications included synthetic chapters on asci, ascospores, and ascomata in handbooks of lichenology and ascomycete taxonomy.

== Lichenology and learned societies ==
Bellemère was closely involved with the Association française de lichénologie (AFL). He served as its president from 1989 to 1993 and sought to make the society more accessible to amateur naturalists, arguing that scientific disciplines needed a broad base of informed amateurs. In 1991 he established annual winter identification workshops at the forest biology station in Fontainebleau, and he promoted specialised sessions on particular lichen groups, including a three-day course on lichenicolous fungi. In 1993 he co-organised an AFL field meeting in Auvergne.

From 1990 to 1997 and again from 2000 to 2004 Bellemère compiled and published in the AFL bulletin a series of structured bibliographic surveys that together recorded lichenological publications worldwide over more than a decade, typically in instalments of at least twenty pages twice a year. He also participated regularly in AFL field sessions and excursions, often accompanied by his wife Christiane, and was remembered by members for his quiet manner and for his preference for traditional dress, including jacket, tie and beret even on field trips.

Beyond lichenology, Bellemère was active in the Société mycologique de France, the Société botanique du Centre-Ouest and the Société botanique de France, contributing to meetings, excursions and publications of these learned societies.

== Honours and legacy ==
Bellemère received several distinctions for his scientific and educational work. He was made an officer of the Ordre des Palmes académiques and a knight of the Ordre national du Mérite. In 1993 the Société botanique de France awarded him the Prix Coincy for taxonomy, with Marie-Agnès Letrouit-Galinou commending his internationally recognised expertise in the fundamental systematics of ascomycetes.

On the occasion of his 70th birthday, the journal Cryptogamie, Bryologie, Lichénologie devoted a double issue in 1998 to a scientific jubilee in his honour, containing 18 papers by 28 mycologists and lichenologists from several countries. A number of fungal taxa were named after him, including the lichen genus Bellemerea, the lichenicolous genus Bellemerella, and species such as Caloplaca bellemerei, Lichenochora bellemerei, and Stigmidium bellemerei. Colleagues regarded his extensive unpublished notes and drawings on mycological and lichenological topics, carefully arranged in binders in his laboratory, as an additional part of this legacy.

Bellemère died on 2 June 2014, aged 86, with his funeral held privately at Auriac-l'Église in the department of Cantal.

== Selected publications ==
- Bellemère, A. (1968). "Contribution à l'étude du développement de l'apothécie chez les discomycètes inoperculés" [Contribution to the study of apothecium development in inoperculate discomycetes]. Bulletin de la Société mycologique de France (in French). 83: 395–931.
- Bellemère, A. (1971). "Les asques et les apothécies des Discomycètes bituniqués" [The asci and apothecia of bitunicate discomycetes]. Annales des Sciences naturelles, Botanique et Biologie végétale (in French). 12: 429–464.
- Bellemère, A. (1982). "Ultrastructure of the ascus and its contribution to the classification of Ascomycetes". In Hawksworth, D.L. (ed.). Ascomycete Systematics. NATO ASI Series. Vol. 269. Boston: Springer. pp. 15–44. doi:10.1007/978-1-4757-9290-4_10. ISBN 978-1-4757-9290-4.
- Hafellner, J.; Bellemère, A. (1981). "Elektronenoptische Untersuchungen an Arten der Flechtengattung Brigantiaea" [Electron-optical investigations on species of the lichen genus Brigantiaea]. Nova Hedwigia (in German). 35 (2–3): 263–312.
- Bellemère, A.; Letrouit-Galinou, M.-A. (1988). "Asci, ascospores, and ascomata". In Galun, M. (ed.). CRC Handbook of Lichenology. Vol. 2. Boca Raton: CRC Press. pp. 161–179. ISBN 978-0-8493-3582-2.
