= Architrypethelium hyalinum =

Scientific classification
- Kingdom: Fungi
- Division: Ascomycota
- Class: Dothideomycetes
- Order: Trypetheliales
- Family: Trypetheliaceae
- Genus: Architrypethelium
- Species: A. hyalinum

Binomial name
- Architrypethelium hyalinum Aptroot (2008)

Species of lichen

Architrypethelium hyalinum is a species of corticolous (bark-dwelling), crustose lichen in the family Trypetheliaceae. Found in Costa Rica and Brazil, it was formally described as a new species in 2008 by lichenologist André Aptroot. The type specimen was collected by Harrie Sipman from the Las Cruces Biological Station in Puntarenas. The lichen has a smooth to uneven, olive-green thallus. Its ascomata occur solitarily, have an apical ostiole, and measure 0.7–1.5 mm in diameter. Ascospores number 4 to 8 per ascus, have an oblong to ellipsoid shape with 3 septa, and measure 100–150 by 30–50 μm. These spores are among the largest of the 3-septate lichens in the Trypetheliaceae. Both the thallus and ascomata contain lichexanthone, a lichen product that causes these structures to glow yellow when lit with a long-wavelength UV light; A. hyalinum is the only species in genus Architrypethelium that contains lichexanthone.
