= Harrie Sipman =

Dutch lichenologist (born 1945)

- Born: 1945 (age 80–81); Sittard, Netherlands
- Education: Utrecht University
- Scientific career
- Fields: Lichenology
- Workplaces: Berlin Botanical Garden and Botanical Museum
- Author abbrev. (botany): Sipman

Henricus (Harrie) Johannes Maria Sipman (born 1945) is a retired Dutch lichenologist who specialised in tropical and subtropical lichens and authored or co-authored over 250 scientific publications. He was the curator of the lichen herbarium at the Berlin Botanical Garden and Botanical Museum from 1983 until his retirement in 2010. Between 1990 and 1997 he edited and distributed the exsiccata Lichenotheca Latinoamericana a museo botanico Berolinensi edita.

== Early life and education ==
Sipman was born on 2 January 1945 in Sittard in the southern part of the Netherlands. As a schoolboy, he developed an interest in paleontology, collecting Cretaceous marine fossils from quarries in the hills surrounding his hometown. He later moved to Utrecht to study biology at Utrecht University.

His first research project at university focused on paleontology, specifically the taxonomy of Cretaceous oysters. Through meticulous analysis, he demonstrated that morphological variations previously used to identify multiple fossil oyster species were actually attributable to environmental factors and growth patterns, a conclusion that challenged existing taxonomic classifications. He later worked on a project studying the physiology of freshwater mollusks before eventually finding his true scientific passion in lichenology.

== Academia ==
Sipman was born in 1945 in Sittard, Netherlands. He attended Utrecht University, where he studied botany. He was appointed to the Herbarium and the Institute for Systematic Botany from 1972 to 1982, where his focus was on lichenology and bryology. During this time, some of his research publications dealt with taxa from the lichen genera Cladonia and Stereocaulon, and on the Musci Anisothecium staphylinum, Campylopus and Ephemerum. His supervisor was Robbert Gradstein (nl). He earned his PhD in 1983 after defending a thesis on the family Megalosporaceae, later published as a monograph in the Bibliotheca Lichenologica series. Afterwards he started a long career as curator of lichens in the Berlin Botanical Garden and Botanical Museum.

== Research career ==
During his career at the Berlin Botanical Garden and Botanical Museum, Sipman specialized in tropical lichenology. He participated in numerous field expeditions, including trips to the Galapagos Islands, Ecuador, the Guianas, Papua New Guinea, Costa Rica, and the Dutch Antilles. These expeditions expanded scientific knowledge of lichen diversity in these regions, sometimes increasing the documented lichen flora of certain areas by a factor of three or more.

Sipman's professional contributions extended beyond research. He served as editor for several publications including Buxbaumiella, the International Lichenological Newsletter, and Tropical Bryology. He created identification keys and illustrations of tropical lichens that were made available online and widely used by students and researchers. He also worked on making the Mattick index (a bibliography of lichenological literature) accessible to the broader scientific community.

Frequent collaborators include André Aptroot, Teuvo Ahti, Paul Diederich, Mark Seaward, Emmanuël Sérusiaux and Richard Harris. Many of his publications deal with lichen floras of tropical and subtropical countries such as Colombia, Costa Rica, Guiana and New Guinea.

== Personal ==
Colleagues describe Sipman as adaptable and patient during field expeditions, qualities particularly valuable when working in tropical regions with challenging conditions. He was an early adopter of technology in his field, being among the first to use GPS equipment during field work in New Guinea and purchasing a personal computer (Apple Macintosh) at a time when such technology was not yet widely used in his discipline. Though not particularly fond of academic conferences, he was noted to have attended more International Association for Lichenology meetings than most of his contemporaries.

Throughout his career, Sipman was known for his generosity in helping colleagues and students by identifying specimens, providing literature assistance, offering technical support with thin-layer chromatography, and contributing to the improvement of manuscripts.

== Recognition ==
A Festschrift was dedicated to his honour in 2009, on the occasion of his 64th birthday and impending retirement. The volume includes 29 peer-reviewed contributions of various aspects of lichenology written by 50 of his colleagues. It also has a biography, a list of his scientific publications and a list of new taxa he introduced (9 genera and 213 species).

=== Eponymy ===
Four genera are named after Sipman:

- Heiomasia Nelsen, Lücking & Rivas Plata (2010) (family Graphidaceae) – combines the letters Henricus Ioannes Marius Sipman
- Sipmania Egea & Torrente (1994) (family Roccellaceae)
- Sipmanidea Xavier-Leite, M.Cáceres & Lücking (2023) (family Gomphillaceae)
- Sipmaniella Kalb (2009) (family Megalosporaceae).

Many species have been named in Sipman's honour. These eponyms include: Leproloma sipmanianum Kümmerl. & Leuckert (1991); Phacopsis falcispora var. sipmanii Diederich & Triebel (1995); Xanthoparmelia sipmanii T.H.Nash & Elix (1995); Opegrapha sipmanii Matzer (1996); Relicina sipmanii Elix (1996); Rinodina sipmanii Aptroot (1997); Sporopodiopsis sipmanii Sérus. (1997); Pertusaria sipmanii A.W.Archer & Elix (1998); Trichothelium sipmanii Lücking (1998); Bulbothrix sipmanii Aptroot & Aubel (1999); Parmotrema sipmanii Louwhoff & Elix (1999); Cladonia sipmanii Ahti (2000); Lecania sipmanii van den Boom & Zedda (2000); Diorygma sipmanii Kalb, Staiger & Elix (2004); Enterographa sipmanii Sparrius (2004); Imshaugia sipmanii Elix (2004); Tricharia sipmanii Lücking (2008); Xanthoria sipmanii S.Y.Kondr. & Kärnefelt (2008); Bacidia sipmanii M.Brand, Coppins, van den Boom & Sérus. (2009); Buellia sipmanii Bungartz & V.Wirth (2009); Caloplaca sipmanii S.Y.Kondr., Kärnefelt, Elix & Vondrák (2009); Chapsa sipmanii Frisch & Kalb (2009); Herpothallon sipmanii Aptroot, Lücking & Rivas Plata (2009); Micarea sipmanii Sérus. & Coppins (2009); Pyrenula sipmanii Aptroot & K.H.Moon (2009); Synarthothelium sipmanianum Sparrius (2009); Zwackhiomyces sipmanii Diederich & Zhurb. (2009); Lobariella sipmanii B.Moncada, Betanc. & Lücking (2011); Remototrachyna sipmaniana Kukwa & Flakus (2012); Astrochapsa sipmanii Weerakoon & Lücking (2015); Sclerococcum sipmanii Diederich (2015); Astrothelium sipmanii Aptroot (2016); Endococcus sipmanii Etayo (2017); Pygmaeosphaera sipmaniana Etayo (2017); Rhizocarpon sipmanianum Kalb & Aptroot (2017); Carbacanthographis sipmaniana Feuerstein & Lücking (2022); Fissurina sipmanii Lücking, B.Moncada & Álvaro (2023); and Ocellularia sipmanii Lücking, B.Moncada & Álvaro (2023).

== Selected publications ==
A complete list of publications (up to 2008) is given by Aptroot in the 2009 Festschrift. Some of Sipman's work includes the following:

- Sipman, H.J.M. (1980). "Studies on Colombian Cryptogams X. The genus Everniastrum Hale and related taxa (Lichenes)". Proceedings of the Koninklijke Nederlandse Akademie van Wetenschappen. Series C. 83: 333–354.
- Sipman, H.J.M. (1983). "A Monograph of the Lichen Family Megalosporaceae". Mededelingen van het Botanisch Museum en Herbarium van de Rijksuniversiteit te Utrecht. Bibliotheca Lichenologica. 18 (1). Vaduz: J. Cramer: 1–241.
- Sipman, Harrie J.M.; Aptroot, Andre (2001). "Where are the missing lichens?". Mycological Research. 105 (12): 1433–1439. doi:10.1017/s0953756201004932.
- Sipman, H.; Raus, T. (2002). "An inventory of the lichen flora of Kalimnos and parts of Kos (Dodecanisos, Greece)". Willdenowia. 32 (2): 351–392. doi:10.3372/wi.32.32216.
- Sipman, H. J. M. 2005: Líquenes de los Páramos de Costa Rica. Pp. 242-360 in: M. Kappelle & S. Horn (Eds.), Páramos de Costa Rica. 786 pp.
- Seaward, M.R.D., Sipman, H.J.M. & Sohrabi, M. 2008: A revised checklist of lichenized, lichenicolous and allied fungi for Iran. In: Türk, R., John, V. & Hauck, M. (eds). Facetten der Flechtenforschung. Festschrift zu Ehren von Volkmar Wirth. Sauteria 15: 459 –520.
- Sipman, Harrie J.M.; Lücking, Robert; Aptroot, André; Chaves, José Luis; Kalb, Klaus; Tenorio, Loengrin Umaña (2012). "A first assessment of the Ticolichen biodiversity inventory in Costa Rica and adjacent areas: the thelotremoid Graphidaceae (Ascomycota: Ostropales)". Phytotaxa. 55 (1): 255–321. doi:10.11646/phytotaxa.55.1.1.
- Umaña, Loengrin; Sipman, H.J.M. (2002). Líquenes de Costa Rica [Costa Rica lichens] (in Spanish). Santo Domingo, Heredia, Costa Rica: INBio. pp. 1–160. ISBN 9968-702-74-9. OCLC 51875722.

== See also ==
- Category:Taxa named by Harrie Sipman
