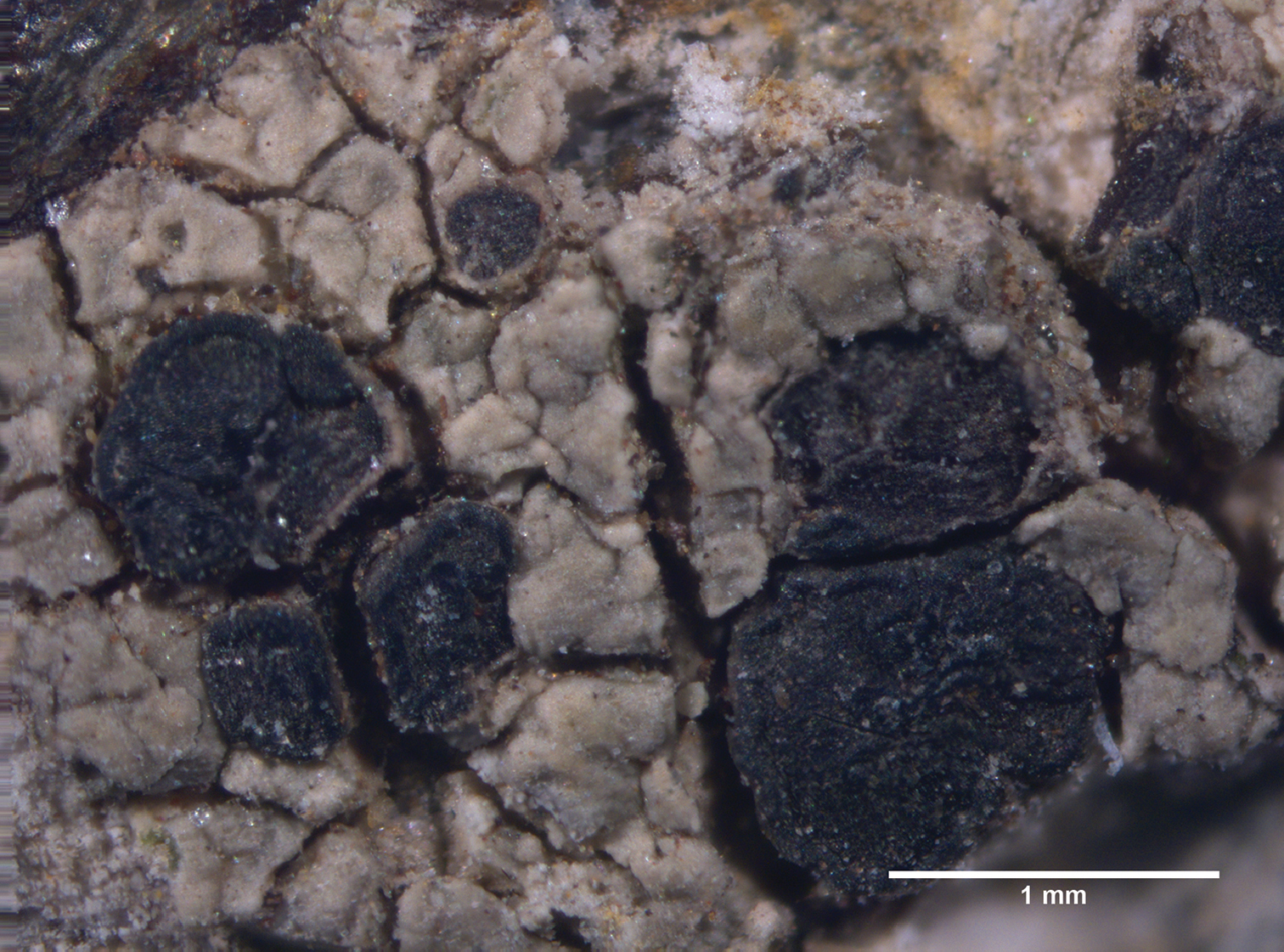
- L. aptrootii. Thallus and apothecia of the holotype

Scientific classification
- Kingdom: Fungi
- Division: Ascomycota
- Class: Lecanoromycetes
- Order: Lecideales
- Family: Lecideaceae
- Genus: Lecidea
- Species: L. aptrootii

Binomial name
- Lecidea aptrootii M.Khan, A.N.Khalid & Lumbsch (2018)

= Lecidea aptrootii =

Species of lichen

Lecidea aptrootii is a species of saxicolous (rock-dwelling), crustose lichen in the family Lecideaceae. Described as a new species in 2018, it is found in northwestern Pakistan, where it grows on exposed siliceous rocks. This lichen forms a thin crust that breaks into irregular, tile-shaped patches coloured greenish-grey to pale brown, and produces frequent black, disc-shaped fruiting bodies up to 1.5 mm wide with thin raised rims.

== Taxonomy ==
The lichen was formally described as a new species in 2018 by Memoona Khan, Abdul Khalid, and H. Thorsten Lumbsch. The type specimen was collected in the Gabin Jabba valley (Swat District, Khyber Pakhtunkhwa) at an altitude of 1,600 m (5,200 ft). This area has a moist temperate climate, with snowfall during winter and much rainfall during summer. The species epithet honours the Dutch lichenologist André Aptroot, who suggested to the authors that the taxon might represent a new species.

Molecular studies have shown that Lecidea aptrootii is closely related to L. uniformis and L. grisella, forming a well-supported evolutionary lineage along with L. fuscoatra.

== Description ==
Lecidea aptrootii forms a thin, crust-like growth that hugs the surface of its rocky substrate (saxicolous and crustose). The thallus breaks up into irregular, tile-shaped patches (areoles) that sit close together and reach about 1.2 mm across and 0.3 mm thick. Their surface is dull and slightly rough, coloured greenish-grey to pale brown from centre to edge, and sometimes edged by a narrow black line of fungal threads known as the prothallus. Internally the outer "skin" (cortex) is indistinct and only about 30 μm thick, while the white inner layer (medulla) shows no iodine reaction (I–) and contains tightly packed, thin-walled hyphae roughly 2.5 μm wide. Just beneath the surface sits the algal partner: a band up to 63 μm thick of globose green cells 13–14 μm in diameter.

Black, disc-shaped fruiting bodies (apothecia) are frequent. They are round to slightly irregular, up to 1.5 mm wide, and lack the powdery bloom (epruinose) seen in some other species. Each bears a thin, persistent rim formed only by fungal tissue (a lecideine margin) that is slightly raised above the flat to gently domed disc. Within the apothecium the colourless hymenium stands 70–100 μm tall, capped by a pale to dark brown epihymenium, and underlain by a similarly pigmented subhymenium and hypothecium. The spore-producing sacs (asci) are club-shaped, eight-spored, and show a strong blue amyloid reaction in iodine (I+ blue) owing to a thickened cap (tholus). Their smooth, single-celled ascospores are ellipsoid, typically 8–10 × 4.5–5.5 μm. The intertwining sterile filaments (paraphyses) are 1.6–2.4 μm wide and branch to form a loose network; no asexual propagules or conidiomata have been observed.

Spot test chemistry distinguishes the species: the thallus remains unchanged with potassium hydroxide (K−), but turns bright red with sodium hypochlorite alone (C+ red) or after combined treatment (KC+), and shows no reaction with para-phenylenediamine (P−) or under ultraviolet light (UV−). High-performance thin-layer chromatography detects gyrophoric acid, schizopeltic acid, and 2'-O-methylperlatolic acid as the main secondary metabolites.

== See also ==
- List of Lecidea species
