= Lecidea hassei =

Scientific classification
- Domain: Eukaryota
- Kingdom: Fungi
- Division: Ascomycota
- Class: Lecanoromycetes
- Order: Lecideales
- Family: Lecideaceae
- Genus: Lecidea
- Species: L. hassei

Binomial name
- Lecidea hassei Zahlbr. (1912)

Species of lichen

Lecidea hassei (Hasse's lecidea lichen) is an endolithic lichen that appears as tiny black, gray rimmed, plate-like or crinkled discs between crystals of rock in California. The main body grows inside solid rock (endolithic), and the crinkled discs above the rock surface are the sexual reproduction structures. It is endemic to California, where it only grows in the lower montane belt, including in deserts and chaparral. It occurs in Joshua Tree National Park. The sexual reproduction structures (apothecia) are black, thinly rimmed (70–100 μm ) with unpigmented fungal tissue surrounding black discs in the middle, and up to 2.2 mm in diameter. They rise out of the rock in a flat to convex disc with a constricted base, giving the appearance of tiny raised plates. It grows in open areas on granite, schist, and other acidic rock. It resembles Lecidea laboriosa but produces schizopeltic acid as a metabolite, instead of 4-O-demethyl planaic acid. The species epithet honors H.E. Hasse, who wrote the 1913 "Lichen Flora of Southern California". Lichen spot tests are negative on both the cortex and medulla (K−, C−, KC−, P−).

== See also ==
- List of Lecidea species
