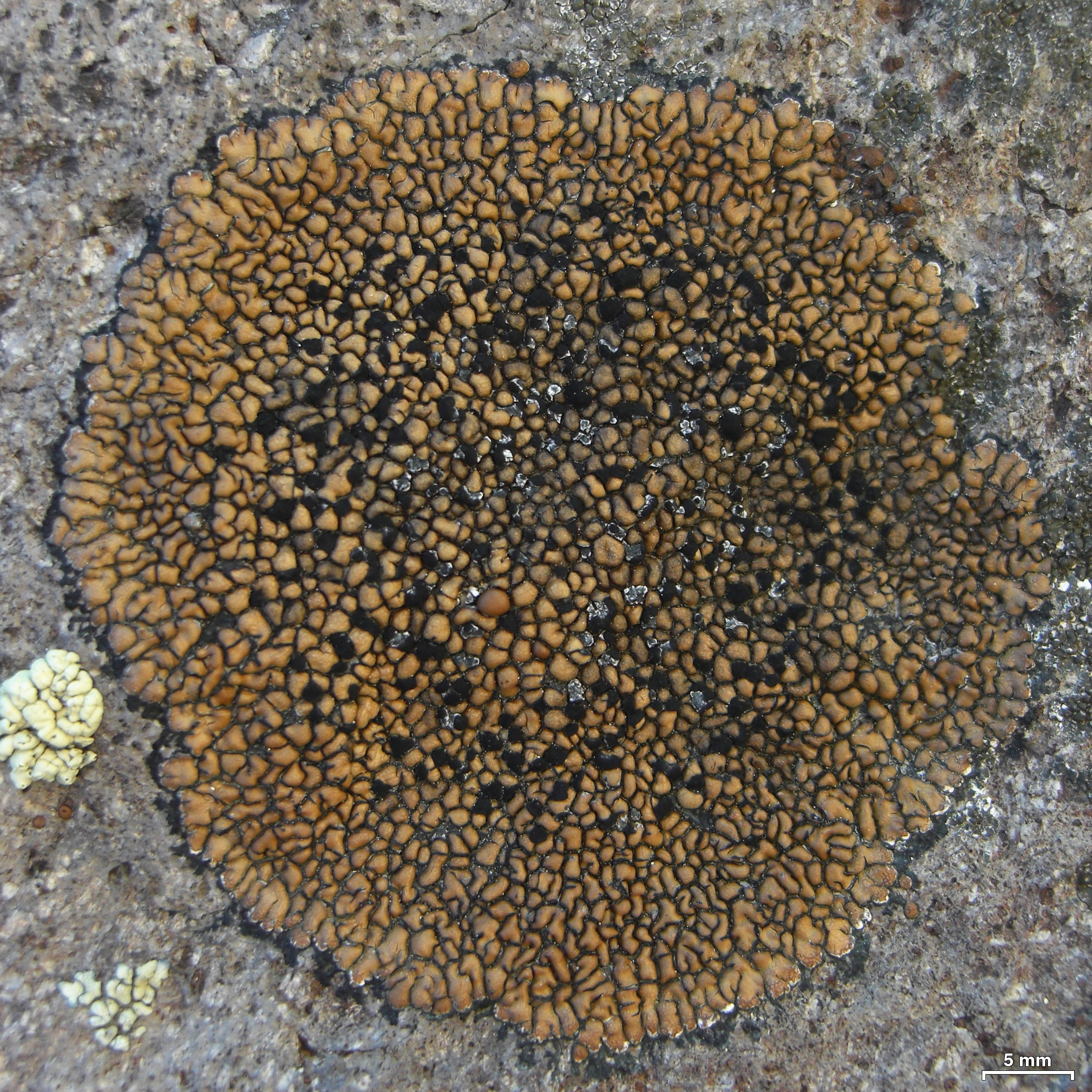

Scientific classification
- Kingdom: Fungi
- Division: Ascomycota
- Class: Lecanoromycetes
- Order: Lecideales
- Family: Lecideaceae
- Genus: Lecidea
- Species: L. perlatolica

Binomial name
- Lecidea perlatolica Hertel & Leuckert (2004)

= Lecidea perlatolica =

Species of lichen

Lecidea perlatolica is a species of saxicolous (rock-dwelling) crustose lichen in the family Lecideaceae. It occurs in the southwestern United States and is named after perlatolic acid, the main lichen product it makes. This lichen grows on acidic rocks in mountain and subalpine areas, typically at elevations between 1,830 and 3,350 m (6,000 and 11,000 ft). The species forms small, brownish, tile-like patches on rock surfaces and has been found in California, Nevada, and Utah.

== Taxonomy ==
The species was formally described in 2004 by Hannes Hertel and Christian Leuckert in the second volume of the Lichen Flora of the Greater Sonoran Desert Region series. It is named for its characteristic secondary metabolite, perlatolic acid.

Recent molecular work places Lecidea perlatolica within the L. atrobrunnea complex ("clade L01"), a species group showing substantial cryptic diversity and several non-monophyletic named taxa; the authors call for an integrative revision that combines morphology, chemistry, geography, and multilocus data. In that study the species was represented by a single ITS sample from southern Nevada and formed a distinct lineage within the L. atrobrunnea clade.

== Description ==
Lecidea perlatolica forms a crust-like thallus that breaks into small, tile-like patches (areoles). A dark border of fungal tissue (the prothallus) may be absent or show as a thin black to black-green line between patches. The areoles can touch or sit a little apart; those at the edge often develop narrow, lobed outlines. Individual areoles are flat to strongly domed, and in well-developed specimens can look like tiny scales or even short stalked bumps; they measure about 0.9–1.5 (rarely up to 3) mm across and 0.4–0.8 mm tall. The upper surface is pale to medium brown (occasionally darker toward the center), smooth and shiny to faintly roughened, and sometimes edged by a narrow pale or dark rim that may curl slightly downward. The outer skin (cortex) is stratified into three thin layers, the uppermost being a translucent sheet of dead, compacted cells. Beneath this lies a green algal layer and a white inner layer (the medulla), which turns a vivid violet when stained with iodine. In some specimens with scale-like areoles, a dark lower surface can be seen.

The fruiting bodies (apothecia) are black, round to slightly irregular discs with a subtly narrowed base, usually 0.7–1.4(–2.3) mm in diameter. Their tops are flat to gently convex and may be matte or carry a faint dusting (pruina); a black rim typically remains visible. Around the rim, the outermost tissue grades to a green-black zone, while the thin surface layer over the disc itself is bright green under the microscope. The spore-bearing layer (hymenium) is clear, 40–60 μm tall, and gives a blue reaction with iodine. Its supporting threads (paraphyses) are mostly simple, only rarely forked or connected to neighbors. The tissues below the hymenium range from colorless to medium brown. The asci (the spore sacs) are club-shaped, 40–65 × 13–16 μm, and usually contain eight spores. The ascospores are colorless, single-celled, and ellipsoid to narrowly oblong, on average 8–10.5 × 3.4–4.6 μm.

Asexual structures are also present: tiny, immersed black dots (pycnidia) produce very slender, rod-like to thread-like conidia that are straight and average (10.5–)12–19(–24) × about 1 μm. Standard spot tests on the cortex and medulla are typically negative (K−, C−, KC−, P−), though occasional specimens show weak K+ (yellow or red) and rare P+ (yellow) reactions. The main secondary metabolite is perlatolic acid; some thalli also contain traces of 2'-O-methylperlatolic, confluentic, or norstictic acid. Perlatolic acid in this species gives no reaction to the sulfuric acid heat ("S") spot test developed for detecting miriquidic acid.

== Habitat and distribution ==
Lecidea perlatolica grows on acidic rock in open, well-lit sites within the montane to subalpine zones, at elevations between about 1,830 and 3,350 m (6,000 and 10,990 ft). It has been recorded from the western United States: California (Butte, El Dorado, Inyo, Los Angeles, Mono, San Bernardino, Tulare, and Tuolumne counties), Utah, and Nevada.

== See also ==
- List of Lecidea species
