= Lecidea hoganii =

Scientific classification
- Domain: Eukaryota
- Kingdom: Fungi
- Division: Ascomycota
- Class: Lecanoromycetes
- Order: Lecideales
- Family: Lecideaceae
- Genus: Lecidea
- Species: L. hoganii

Binomial name
- Lecidea hoganii E.Tripp & Lendemer (2015)

Species of lichen

Lecidea hoganii is a rare species of saxicolous (rock-dwelling), crustose lichen in the family Lecideaceae. It is known to occur only in Boulder, Colorado, where it grows in association with other lichens in mixed saxicolous communities on sandstone in the Fox Hills Formation. The lichen is characterized by its thick white, chalky thallus, sessile to raised apothecia, presence of a dark pink pigment in the hymenium, and absence of secondary compounds.

== Taxonomy ==
The species was formally described by lichenologists Erin Tripp and James Lendemer in 2015. It belongs to the Lecidea auriculata morphological group and is evolutionarily related to the L. tessellata group. The specific epithet honors Tim Hogan (Collections Manager of the Colorado herbarium) for his decades of contributions to knowledge of the Colorado flora, particularly with respect to the alpine, subalpine, and surrounding montane ecosystems; the authors note that this species "is dark and complex, but a little rosy on the inside".

== Description ==
Lecidea hoganii has a crustose, epilithic thallus that is conspicuously raised above the substrate, forming rosettes up to 7 cm (2.8 in) in diameter and 0.6 mm thick. It lacks soredia, isidia, or other lichenized diaspores, and has an indistinct or lacking prothallus. The upper surface is dull, chalky white, lacks pruina, and the upper cortex is 60–110 μm thick, poorly defined and densely inspersed with crystals. The apothecia are lecideine, 0.5–2.0 mm in diameter, erumpent, and initially immersed but soon becoming distinctly sessile to prominently raised above the thallus on columns of thalline tissue up to 0.9 mm tall. The photobiont of Lecidea hoganii is a green alga, with coccoid cells 13–17 μm in diameter. All standard chemical spot tests are negative.

== Habitat and distribution ==
Lecidea hoganii is found at White Rocks Open Space in Boulder County, Colorado, on tilted and for the most part sun-exposed surfaces of sandstone boulders derived from the Fox Hills Formation. It occurs in mixed saxicolous communities growing in close association with other lichens such as Caloplaca decipiens, Lecidella carpathica, L. patavina, and Rinodina strausii. The species is globally and locally rare, and, as of 2017, is only known from the White Rocks Open Space area.

== Conservation ==
Lecidea hoganii is found infrequently at White Rocks Open Space and is not known to occur in any other locality, suggesting that the species is both globally and locally rare. The authors suggest that this species merits ranking under the IUCN Red List as Critically Endangered due to its restricted geographical range, the single known extant population, and the small number of individuals known (less than 50).

== See also ==
- List of Lecidea species
