= Hermann Edward Hasse =

U.S. botanist and lichenologist

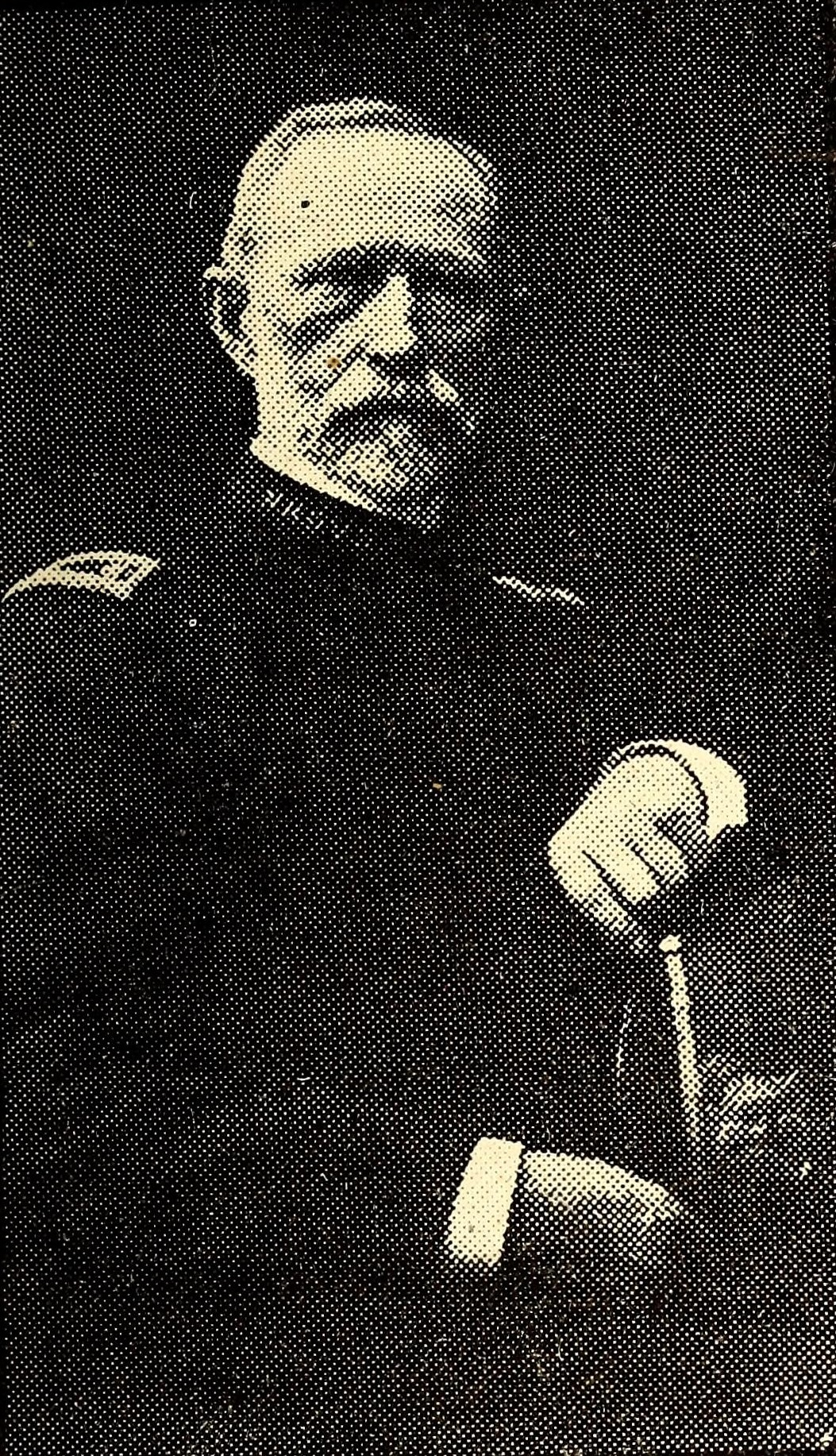

Hermann Edward Hasse (12 January 1836 – 29 October 1915) was an American lichenologist. He wrote two important texts and numerous articles in his field. Hassea, which is a genus of fungi in the class Dothideomycetes, and Lecidea hassei, a lichen that grows inside solid rock (endolithic lichen), were both named in his honor. He principally did his research in southern California. His correspondents included cryptogamic botanist William Gilson Farlow and lichenologist George Knox Merrill. After his death the Sullivant Moss Society with Charles Christian Plitt as editor distributed lichen material collected by Hasse as exsiccata work under the title Lichenes exsiccati ex herb. Dr. H. E. Hasse relicti.

== Publications ==
In 1913, Hasse published The Lichen Flora Of Southern California, a flora of the lichens of southern California covering about 400 taxa. Lichenologist Kerry Knudsen described it as "historic" in the lichenology journal Opuscula Philolichenum., written by Hermann Edward Hasse. He also wrote the earlier Lichens of Southern California, published in 1898, and 30 other papers and notes on lichens, many published in The Bryologist.

== External sources ==
- Letters, Archives of the Farlow Herbarium of Cryptogamic Botany
