= Lecidea toensbergii =

Scientific classification
- Kingdom: Fungi
- Division: Ascomycota
- Class: Lecanoromycetes
- Order: Lecideales
- Family: Lecideaceae
- Genus: Lecidea
- Species: L. toensbergii

Binomial name
- Lecidea toensbergii Haugan & Timdal (2018)
- Holotype: Møre og Romsdal, Norway

Species of lichen

Lecidea toensbergii is a species of saxicolous (rock-dwelling), crustose lichen in the family Lecideaceae. Described as a new species in 2018, it has been documented from several locations in Norway and a single location in Sweden, where it grows in rocky alpine environments.

== Taxonomy ==
The lichen was formally described as a new species in 2018 by the lichenologists Reidar Haugan and Einar Timdal. The type specimen of Lecidea toensbergii was collected by Haugan in the Møre og Romsdal region of Norway. It was found on the western slope of Skarfjellenden in Norddal Municipality (now located in Fjord Municipality), at an elevation of 870 m (2,850 ft). This lichen was growing on siliceous rock within a late snow bed in a low alpine heath environment. The species epithet honours the Norwegian lichenologist Tor Tønsberg.

Lecidea leucothallina is similar in appearance, but unlike L. toensbergii, that species does not produce soredia. At the time of its original publication, L. toensbergii was the only sorediate species in the genus Lecidea.

== Description ==
The thallus of Lecidea toensbergii is areolate (cracked into small, separate pieces), spreading and can exceed 10 cm (4 in) in diameter. It has a black prothallus that is noticeable at the edges of the thallus and between the areolae. The areolae (small areas of the thallus) are roughly equal in size, irregular in shape, ranging from angular to rounded, and can be flat to moderately convex. They are pale grey to pale brown, with a margin that is either the same colour or slightly paler, and have a slightly shiny appearance. The surface is smooth (epruinose) and can be up to 1.0 mm in diameter. The thallus has soralia (reproductive propagules) on the margins of the areolae, which are rounded, sharply defined, and white to pale grey, reacting with PD reagent to turn orange.

The upper cortex (the outer layer of the thallus) is 50–70 μm thick, including an up to 15 μm-thick epinecral layer composed of thick-walled hyphae with irregular orientations. These hyphae often contain crystals that do not dissolve in K but dissolve in PD with the precipitation of orange, needle-shaped crystals. The medulla (inner layer) does not contain crystals and is not reactive to KI.

The apothecia (fruiting bodies) are mostly simple, rounded, or with slightly wavy margins. They are attached either at the edges of the areolae or the hypothallus (the lower layer of the thallus), and can reach up to 1.0 mm in diameter. The disc of the apothecia is flat to slightly convex, black, dull, and faintly white with PD+ orange pruina (a powdery coating). The margin of the apothecia is distinct, persistent, black, and not pruinose. The excipulum (a cup-like structure around the apothecia) is dark brown throughout or slightly lighter inside, without crystals, and is unreactive to K and KI. The hypothecium (the tissue layer below the hymenium) is dark brown, also without crystals, and unreactive to K and KI. The hymenium (the spore-producing layer) is colourless, KI+ blue, and 60–80 μm high. The epihymenium (the upper part of the hymenium) is dark olive brown and contains crystals that do not dissolve in K but react with PD to turn orange.

The ascus (the spore-bearing cell) is club-shaped, with a well-developed, weakly amyloid (starch-like) tholus (a thickened part of the ascus wall) containing a deeply amyloid apical cap and a rudimentary amyloid tube in the upper half, characteristic of the Lecidea type. The ascospores are simple and ellipsoid, measuring 8–12 by 4–5 μm. No conidiomata (structures producing asexual spores) have been observed to occur in this species.

Chemically, Lecidea toensbergii contains pannarin, which can be detected by thin-layer chromatography. The spot tests show that the upper cortex and soralia react PD+ (orange) or sometimes PD–, while the medulla does not react to PD. The apothecial pruina reacts PD+ orange. All parts of the lichen are unreactive to K, C, KC, and UV tests.

== Habitat and distribution ==
Lecidea toensbergii is typically found in rocky, alpine environments. It thrives on vertical to overhanging rock walls and on rocks situated under overhangs. This species prefers more sheltered and drier habitats compared to Lecidea leucothallina. In high alpine boulder fields, such as those in the Jotunheimen Mountains, Lecidea toensbergii is often abundant on the underside of rocks, making it less visible unless the rocks are turned over.

Known from six scattered localities in Norway, Lecidea toensbergii is suspected to have a wide distribution in that country. It ranges from the mountainous regions of southern Norway to the subarctic areas of northern Norway, where specific environmental conditions of these regions support its growth. In 2024, it was reported from Sweden, where it was found on an iron-rich, schistose boulder on a ridge along the northwestern part of the lake Ikesjávrre, near the Norway–Sweden border.

== See also ==
- List of Lecidea species
