= Lecidea griseomarginata =

Scientific classification
- Kingdom: Fungi
- Division: Ascomycota
- Class: Lecanoromycetes
- Order: Lecideales
- Family: Lecideaceae
- Genus: Lecidea
- Species: L. griseomarginata

Binomial name
- Lecidea griseomarginata Fryday (2020)

Species of lichen

Lecidea griseomarginata is a species of lichen in the family Lecideaceae. It is found in Alaska. This rock-dwelling lichen has a body that is mostly hidden within the stone surface, appearing only as a thin black network and tiny grey patches, and produces scattered reproductive structures 0.6–1.0 mm across with distinctive flat, matt-black centres surrounded by wide, pale gray rims. Described as new to science in 2020 from a specimen collected along the shoreline of Ptarmigan Creek in Glacier Bay National Park and Preserve, it is currently known only from its type locality and is distinguished by containing stictic acid as its main lichen product.

== Taxonomy ==
The lichen was described as a new species in 2020 by the lichenologist Alan Fryday. The type specimen was collected in the Hoonah–Angoon Census Area of Glacier Bay National Park, where it was found growing on a granitic rock along the shoreline of Ptarmigan Creek. It is only known to occur at the type locality. The specific epithet griseomarginata refers to the gray proper margin of the apothecia.

== Description ==
Lecidea griseomarginata is a rock-dwelling (saxicolous) crustose lichen whose body (thallus) is mostly hidden in the stone surface. To the naked eye it appears only as a thin black network (the hypothallus) threading between the mineral grains and, here and there, as tiny grey patches that crack into an areolate mosaic. Chemical tests show that the inner layer (medulla) turns blue in iodine (I+), indicating the presence of starch-like compounds. The photosynthetic partner is a green alga with rounded cells 9–15 μm across.

The reproductive structures (apothecia) are scattered individually on the rock. Each is 0.6–1.0 mm in diameter, with the typical lecideine form: a flat, matt-black disc surrounded by a wide, pale gray rim that barely rises above the disc surface. This rim (the excipulum) is colorless inside but mottled with brown patches of radiating fungal threads about 4–5 μm wide; its outer 35–50 μm layer carries an extra blue-black pigment that turns red in nitric acid. Beneath the disc the excipulum extends as a platform of narrower, randomly oriented hyphae that can merge into the side walls of the fruiting body.

The hymenium—the vertical tissue where the spores develop—stands 75–80 μm tall. Its surface layer (epihymenium) is a vivid blue-green, while the supporting layer (hypothecium) is brown and may reach 175 μm thick at the center. Simple, septate paraphyses 1.5–2.0 μm thick thread through the hymenium and broaden to roughly 3 μm at their tips, each capped by the same blue-black pigment. Club-shaped asci of the Lecidea type (40–50 × 12–15 μm) contain eight colorless, single-celled ascospores that are broadly ellipsoid, averaging 12.6 × 6.5 μm with a length-to-width ratio of about 1.9. No asexual propagules (conidiomata) have been observed. In chemical spot test the apothecia yield a yellow solution with potassium hydroxide solution (K+), and thin-layer chromatography reveals stictic acid as the main secondary metabolite.

== See also ==
- List of Lecidea species
