= Lecidea streveleri =

Scientific classification
- Kingdom: Fungi
- Division: Ascomycota
- Class: Lecanoromycetes
- Order: Lecideales
- Family: Lecideaceae
- Genus: Lecidea
- Species: L. streveleri

Binomial name
- Lecidea streveleri T.Sprib. (2020)

Species of lichen

Lecidea streveleri is a species of crustose lichen in the family Lecideaceae. It is found in Canada and the United States. The lichen grows on the bark of alder and balsam poplar. It is known to occur in Alaska as well as Haida Gwaii, British Columbia. This lichen forms thin, smooth patches 0.5–4 cm across with a finely cracked surface that appears mottled when wet, and produces small brown, disk-shaped fruiting bodies with persistent black rims.

== Taxonomy ==
The lichen was described as a new species in 2020 by lichenologist Toby Spribille. The type specimen was collected in the Hoonah–Angoon Census Area of Glacier Bay National Park and Preserve (Alaska). Here it was on steep slopes in a basin on the west side of Dundas Bay, growing on the bark of an alder tree. The specific epithet streveleri honors Gregory P. Streveler, who, according to Spribille, is "an extraordinary naturalist and polymath, and author of numerous scientific papers, who has dedicated much of his life to understanding the natural history of Glacier Bay".

Lecidea streveleri was provisionally placed in the genus Lecidea despite molecular evidence suggesting it belongs to the family Malmideaceae rather than Lecideaceae. Phylogenetic analysis of the closely related L. albofuscescens revealed that this species group clusters within Malmideaceae alongside genera such as Malmidea, Cheiromycina, and Puttea, rather than with typical Lecidea species in Lecideaceae. However, the authors chose not to establish a new genus or transfer the species to an existing Malmideaceae genus, as all currently recognised genera in that family are morphologically distinct and adding L. streveleri would problematically expand their morphological definitions. Following precedent in lichen taxonomy, the species was provisionally retained in Lecidea pending a more comprehensive phylogenetic revision of Malmideaceae, which remains poorly understood taxonomically. This approach mirrors similar cases where morphologically distinctive species have been temporarily housed in established genera while awaiting family-level taxonomic clarification.

== Description ==
Lecidea streveleri is a crustose—tightly appressed—lichen that forms thin, smooth patches 0.5–4 cm across on tree bark. The thallus is rimose (finely cracked) rather than clearly broken into areoles, and when the surface is wet it looks mottled because the green algal partner occurs in little clumps just beneath the cortex. In section the thallus is only about 100 micrometres (μm) thick and shows poor internal layering, apart from a 10–15 μm cortical zone rich in protective polysaccharides. The photobiont comprises chlorococcoid (spherical) algal cells 7–9 μm in diameter. All standard spot tests are negative, and thin-layer chromatography has not detected any lichen products.

The spore-bearing bodies (apothecia) are rounded disks 0.25–0.9 mm wide, scattered singly or in small groups. They are medium brown, dull to faintly shiny, and either weakly domed or almost flat; some develop low, wart-like bumps. Each disk is bordered by its own proper margin, a shiny black-to-brown rim that stays prominent even in old apothecia and becomes translucent and slightly swollen when wet. Beneath this rim lies the exciple, a radiating sheath of fungal hyphae 40–60 μm thick at the sides; internally it is streaked reddish to mid-brown and immersed in a gelatinous layer that harbours bacteria. The hymenium—the vertical tissue where spores develop—stands 48–60 μm high and stains deep blue in iodine, signalling a starch-like component. Threading through it are simple or sparingly branched paraphyses that widen to 4–5 μm at their tips; a thin blue-black pigment caps some of them. Supporting the hymenium is the hypothecium, an unusually thick (up to 200 μm), dark reddish-brown layer of stout-walled hyphae that anchors the apothecium directly to the host bark.

Asci are slender-club-shaped (Bacidia-type) and measure 34–35 × 6–8 μm, each producing eight colourless ascospores. The spores are narrowly ellipsoid, mostly 9.5–10.5 × 3.0–3.5 μm, smooth-walled and single-celled. No asexual propagules have been observed. All standard chemical spot tests on both thallus and apothecia are negative, and thin-layer chromatography reveals no secondary metabolites, so the species is identified chiefly by its mottled, cracked thallus and the small brown apothecia with persistent black rims.

== See also ==
- List of Lecidea species
