= List of Lecidea species =

This is a list of species in the predominantly crustose lichen genus Lecidea. They are commonly known as "disk lichens" or "tile lichens". A 2020 estimate placed about 100 species in the genus. As of January 2024, Species Fungorum accepts 128 species in Lecidea.

== A ==
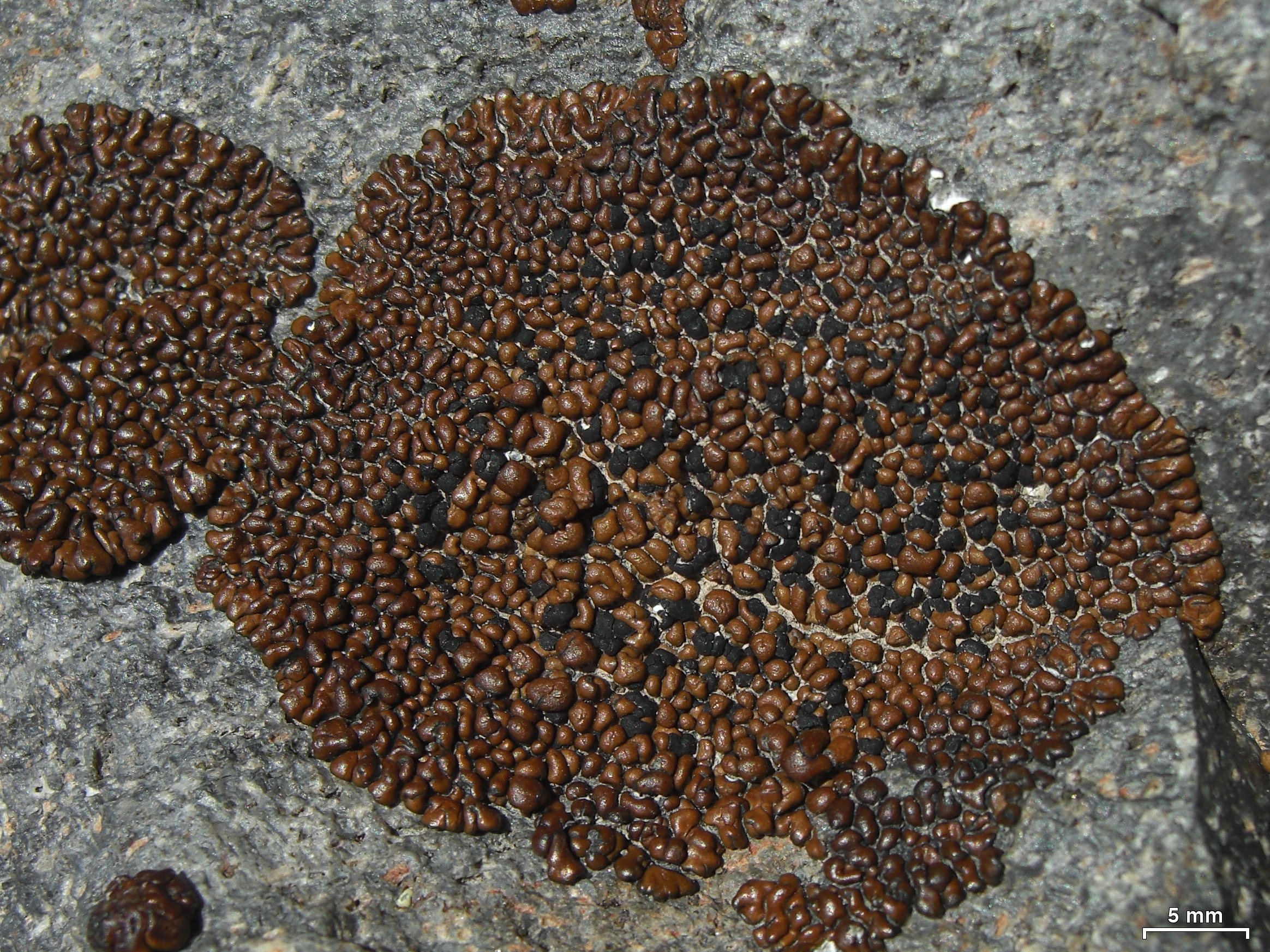
Lecidea atrobrunnea

- Lecidea aberrata Stirt. (1881)
- Lecidea adnata van den Boom & Ertz (2012)
- Lecidea advertens Nyl. (1866)
- Lecidea albofuscescens Nyl. (1867)
- Lecidea albohyalina (Nyl.) Th.Fr. (1874)
- Lecidea antiloga Stirt. (1878)
- Lecidea aptrootii M.Khan, A.N.Khalid & Lumbsch (2018)
- Lecidea atrobrunnea (DC.) Schaer. (1828)
- Lecidea atromorio C.Knight (1876)
- Lecidea aurantia Fryday (2014)
- Lecidea auriculata Th.Fr. (1860)

== B ==
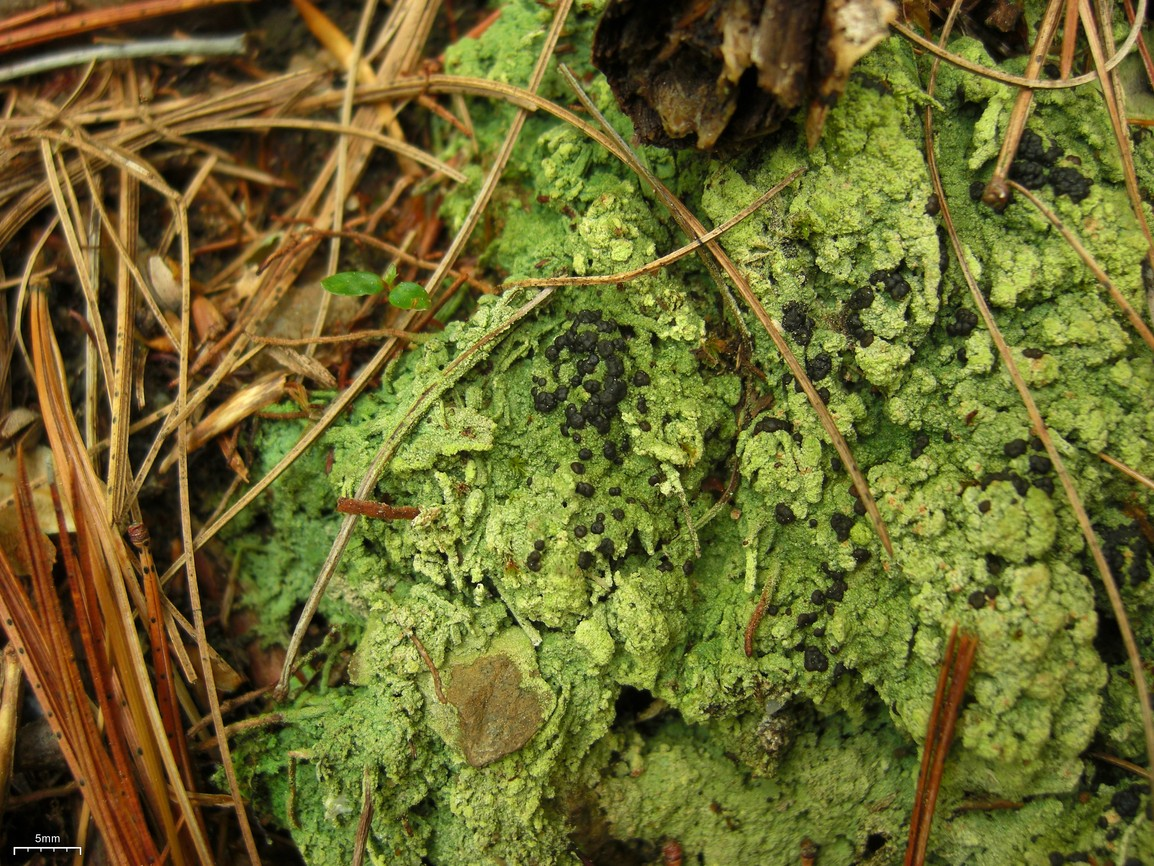
Lecidea berengeriana

- Lecidea bacidioides Müll.Arg. (1882)
- Lecidea berengeriana (A.Massal.) Nyl. (1866)
- Lecidea brodoana Hertel & Leuckert (2004)
- Lecidea brunneonigrescens Werner (1979)
- Lecidea buellielloides S.Y.Kondr. & Hur (2020)

== C ==
- Lecidea callista Stirt. (1874)
- Lecidea calpodes Stirt. (1876)
- Lecidea campbellensis Fryday (2014)
- Lecidea capensis Zahlbr. (1925)
- Lecidea cerarufa (Shirley) Zahlbr. (1925)
- Lecidea cerviniicola B.de Lesd. (1955)
- Lecidea chlorocarpa Leight. (1875)
- Lecidea confluens (Weber) Ach. (1803)
- Lecidea confluentula Müll.Arg. (1872)
- Lecidea contigua (Hoffm.) Fr. (1827)
- Lecidea coriacea Holien & Palice (2016) – Europe; North America
- Lecidea crassilabra Müll.Arg. (1893)

== D ==
- Lecidea demolita Vain. (1934)
- Lecidea deplanaica (Hertel & Leuckert) McCune (2017)
- Lecidea diducens Nyl. (1865)

== E ==
- Lecidea endomelaena Leight. (1878)
- Lecidea erythrophaea Flörke ex Sommerf. (1826)
- Lecidea exigua Chaub. (1821)

== F ==
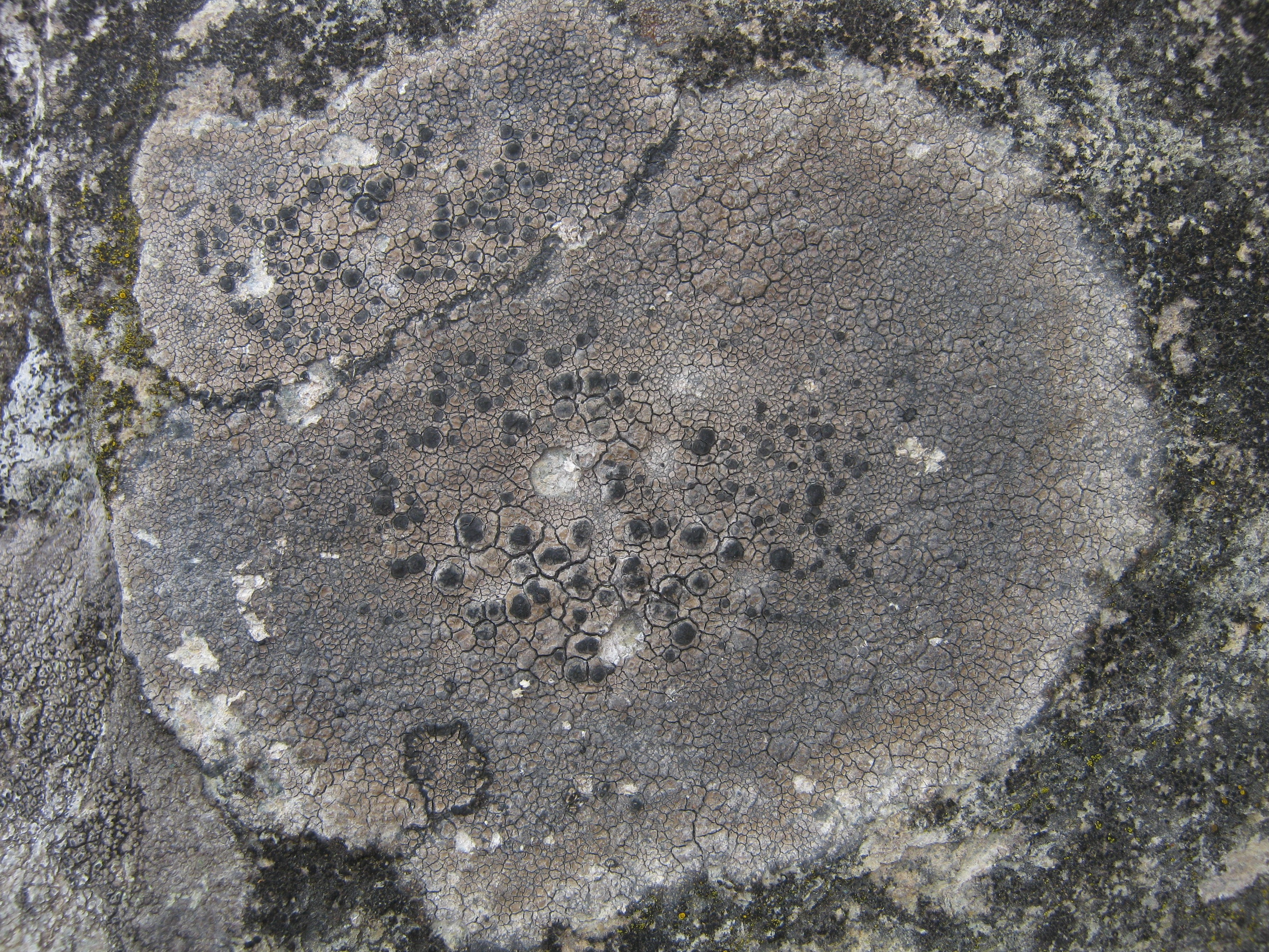
Lecidea fuscoatra

- Lecidea flindersii Cromb. (1879)
- Lecidea fuliginosa Taylor (1836)
- Lecidea fuscoatra (L.) Ach. (1803)
- Lecidea fuscoatrina Hertel & Leuckert (2004)
- Lecidea fuscoatrula Nyl. (1888)

== G ==
- Lecidea globulispora Nyl. (1888)
- Lecidea grisella Flörke (1829)
- Lecidea griseomarginata Fryday (2020)

== H ==
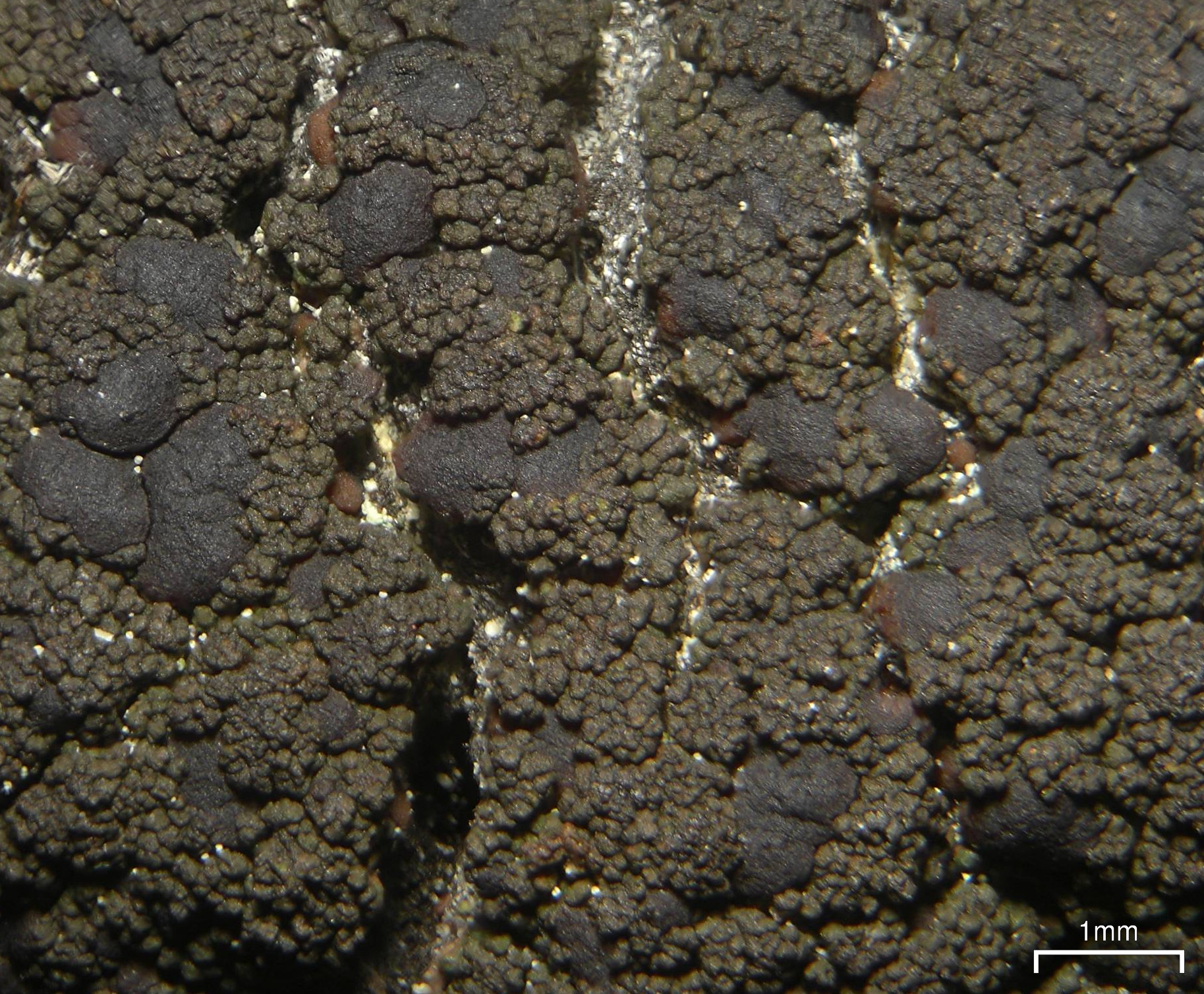
Lecidea holopolia

- Lecidea haerjedalica H.Magn. (1948)
- Lecidea hassei Zahlbr. (1912)
- Lecidea haysomii C.W.Dodge (1968)
- Lecidea helvola (Körb. ex Hellb.) Th.Fr. (1874)
- Lecidea heppii R.A.Anderson & W.A.Weber (1963)
- Lecidea hercynica M.Hauck & Schmull (2005)
- Lecidea herteliana Fryday & Coppins (2012)
- Lecidea hoganii E.Tripp & Lendemer (2015)
- Lecidea hypersporella Stirt. (1876)
- Lecidea hypopta Ach. (1803)

== I ==
- Lecidea immarginata R.Br. ex Cromb. (1879)
- Lecidea inops Th.Fr. (1874)
- Lecidea insulana Müll.Arg. (1895)
- Lecidea interjuncta Nyl. (1864)
- Lecidea intersita Nyl. (1876)
- Lecidea interstincta Nyl. (1864)

== K ==
- Lecidea kalbii Hertel (1984)
- Lecidea kingmanii (Hasse) Hertel & S.Ekman (2004)

== L ==
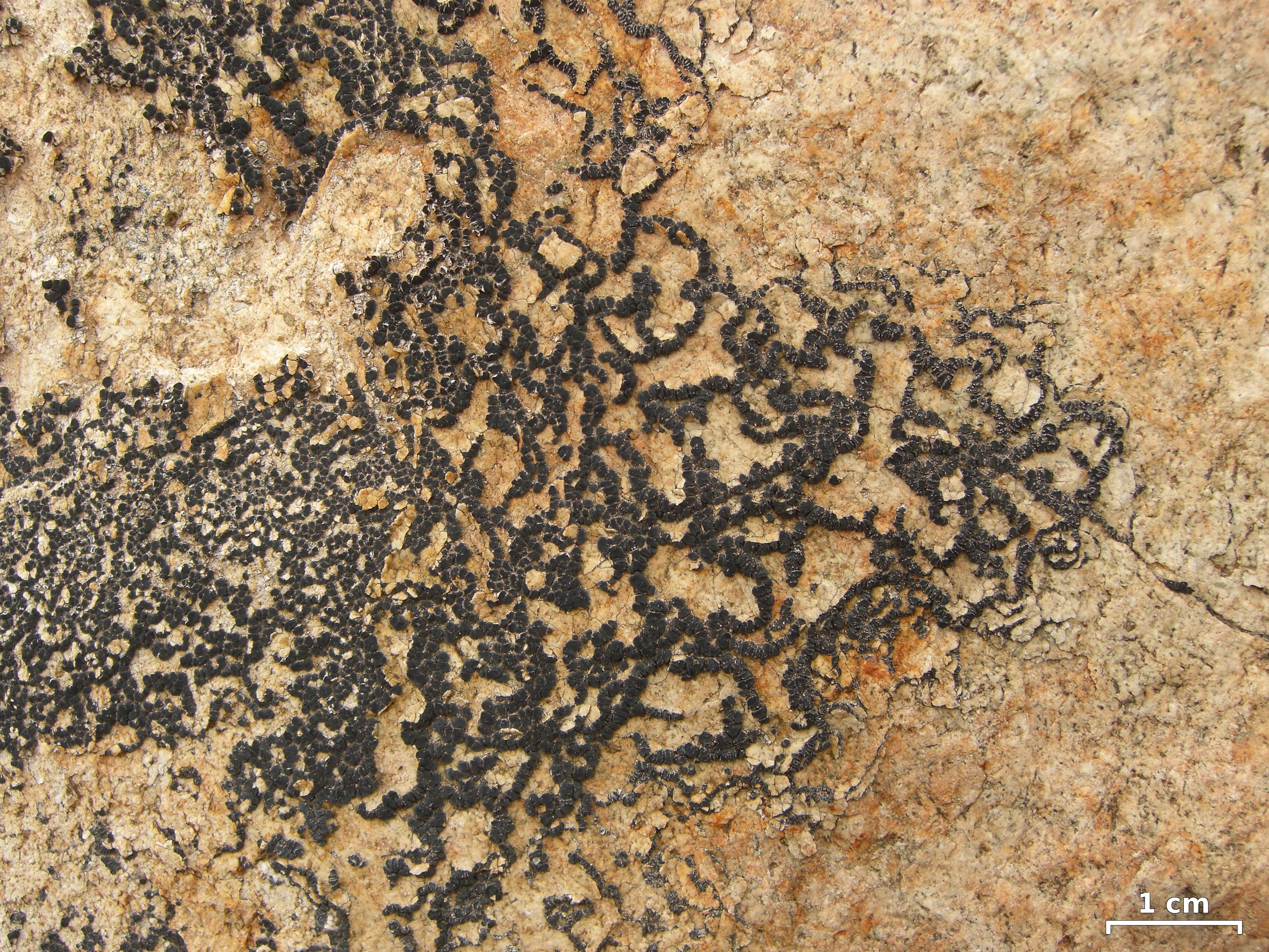
Lecidea laboriosa

- Lecidea lactea Flörke ex Schaer. (1828)
- Lecidea lapicida (Ach.) Ach. (1803)
- Lecidea leprarioides Tønsberg (1992)
- Lecidea leptolomoides Müll.Arg. (1893)
- Lecidea lichenicola (A.L.Sm. & Ramsb.) D.Hawksw. (1978)
- Lecidea lithophila (Ach.) Ach. (1814)
- Lecidea ludibunda Müll.Arg. (1887)
- Lecidea lygomma Nyl. (1875)
- Lecidea lygommella Elix (2011)
- Lecidea lygommoides Rambold (1989)

== M ==
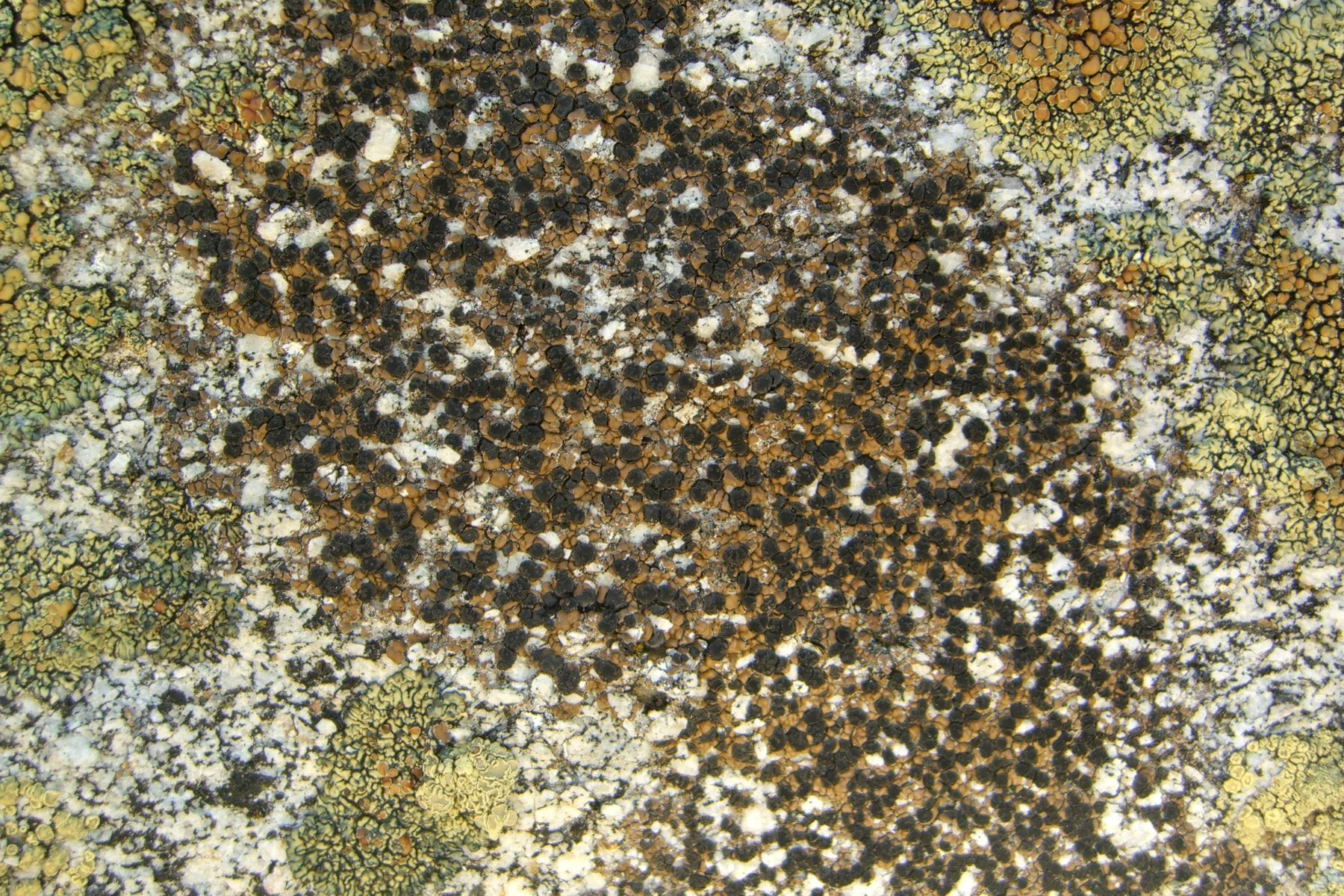
Lecidea mannii

- Lecidea macquariensis C.W.Dodge (1970)
- Lecidea mannii Tuck. (1888)
- Lecidea meiospora (Nyl.) Nyl. (1872)
- Lecidea moritzii B.de Lesd. (1957)
- Lecidea mucosa Stirt. (1879)
- Lecidea multiflora Taylor (1847)
- Lecidea mutabilis Fée (1837)

== N ==
- Lecidea nylanderi (Anzi) Th.Fr. (1874)

== O ==
- Lecidea obluridata Nyl. (1873)
- Lecidea ochroleuca Pers. (1827)
- Lecidea oreophila K.Knudsen & Kocourk. (2014) – California

== P ==
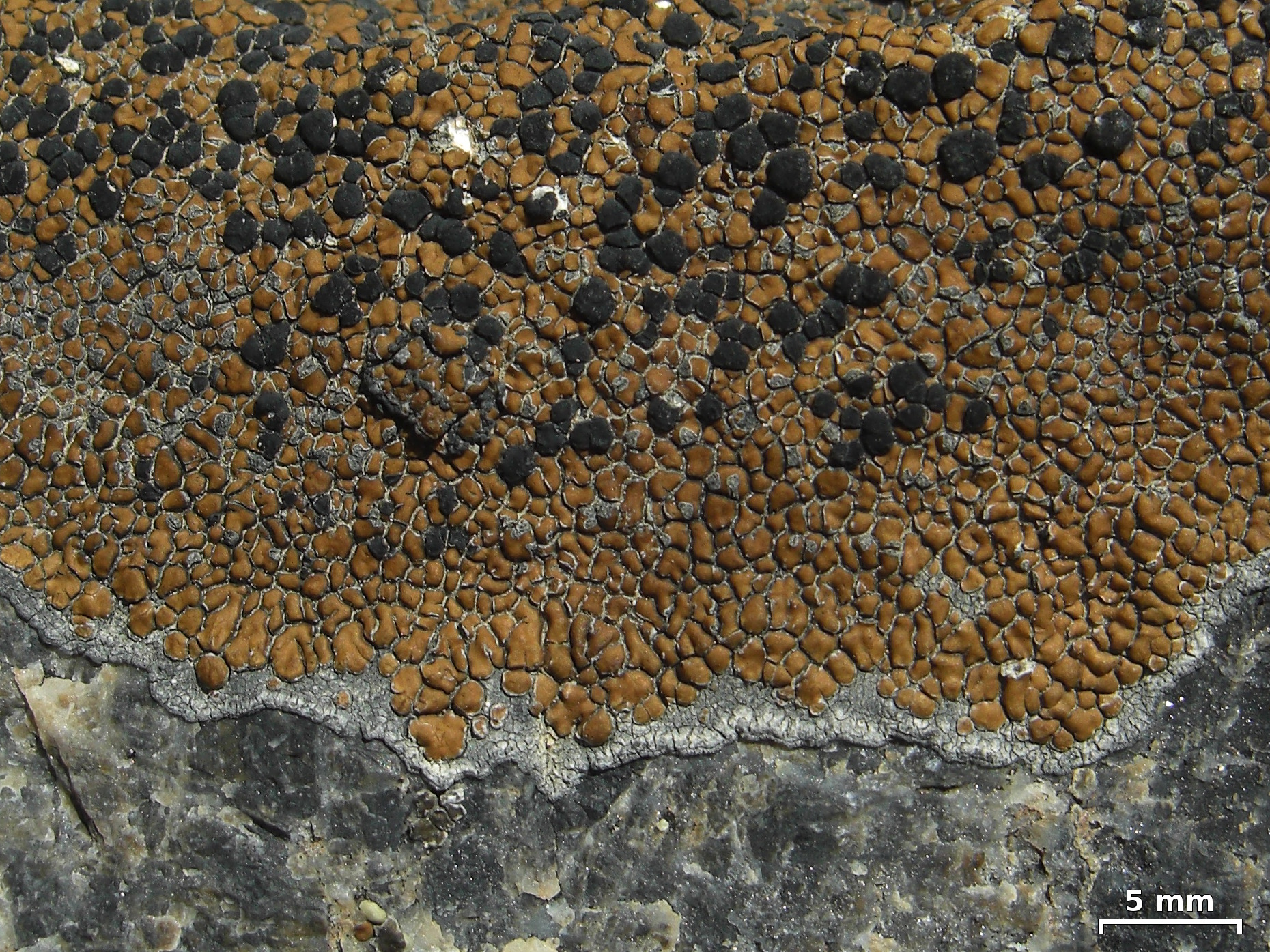
Lecidea protabacina

- Lecidea pallidoatra Nyl. (1888)
- Lecidea paraclitica Nyl. (1872)
- Lecidea paupercula Th.Fr. (1874)
- Lecidea pelochroa Nyl. (1864)
- Lecidea perlatolica Hertel & Leuckert (2004)
- Lecidea phaeophysata Fryday, van den Boom & M.Brand (2019)
- Lecidea phaeops Nyl. (1858)
- Lecidea plana (J.Lahm) Nyl. (1872)
- Lecidea polypycnidophora U.Rupr. & Türk (2010)
- Lecidea porphyria C.Knight (1882)
- Lecidea promiscens Nyl. (1872)
- Lecidea promiscua Nyl. (1872)
- Lecidea promixta Nyl. (1898)
- Lecidea pseudaglaea Hertel (2004)

== R ==
- Lecidea rubrocastanea T.Sprib. & Printzen (2007) – western North America

== S ==
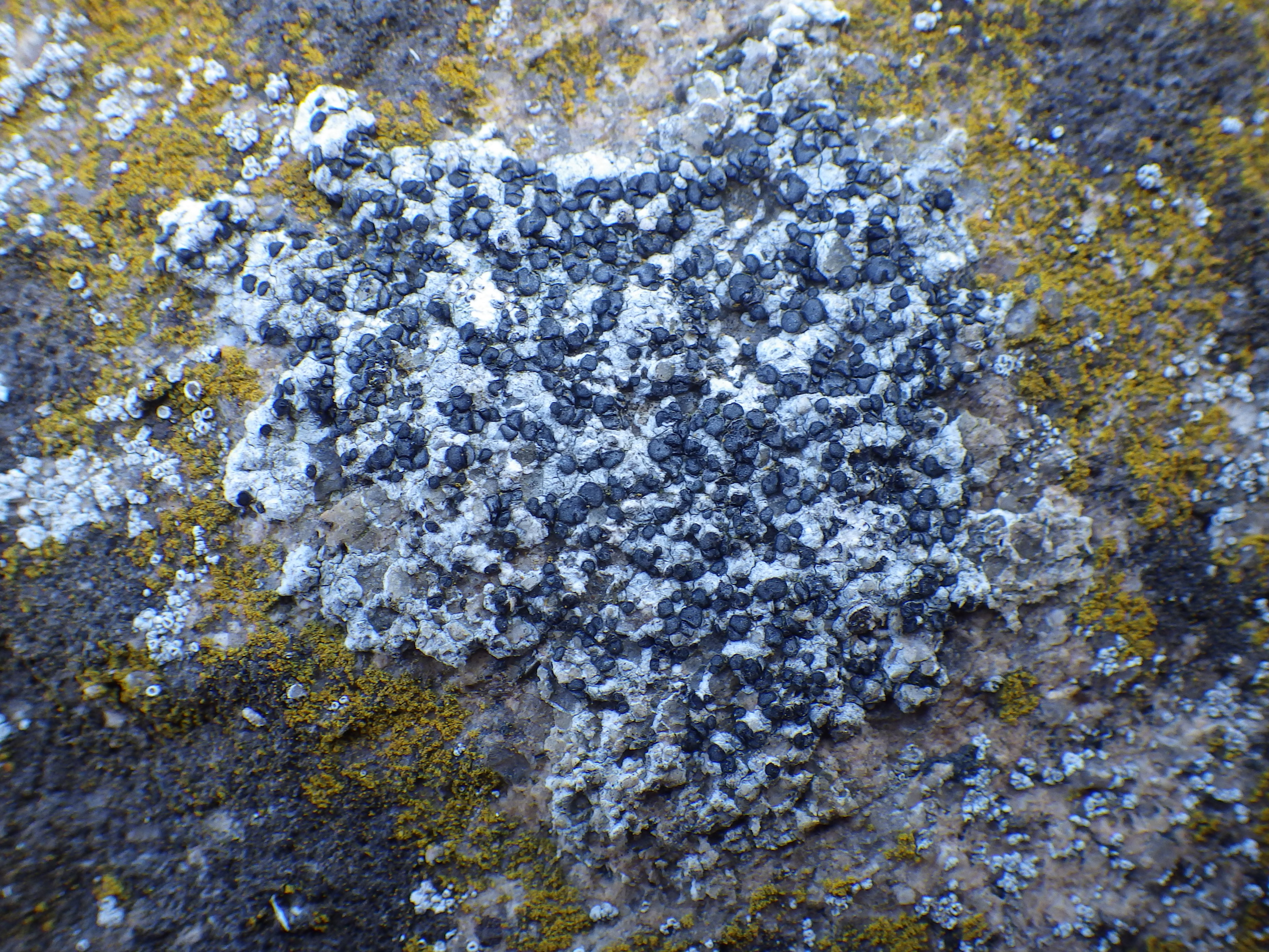
Lecidea sarcogynoides

- Lecidea sarcogynoides Körb. (1855)
- Lecidea scabrida C.Knight (1886)
- Lecidea schizopeltica Hertel & Leuckert (2004)
- Lecidea selenospora Müll.Arg. (1896)
- Lecidea semitensis (Tuck.) Hasse (2006)
- Lecidea siderolithica Müll.Arg. (1872)
- Lecidea silacea (Hoffm.) Ach. (1882)
- Lecidea somphoterella Vain. (1934)
- Lecidea soredioatrobrunnea Zakeri, Yazici & Aptroot (2021)
- Lecidea stirtoniana Zahlbr. (1925)
- Lecidea stratura K.Knudsen & Lendemer (2016) – United States
- Lecidea streveleri T.Sprib. (2020)
- Lecidea subassentiens Nyl. (1876)
- Lecidea subcaerulea Stirt. (1899)
- Lecidea subcinerascens Nyl. (1877)
- Lecidea subfilamentosa (Zahlbr.) Fryday (2008)
- Lecidea sublygomma Zahlbr. (1906)
- Lecidea subplana Nyl. (1875)
- Lecidea subsimilis Nyl. (1863)
- Lecidea subspeirea Coppins, P.James & Hertel (1995)
- Lecidea superjecta Nyl. (1877)
- Lecidea swartzioidea Nyl. (1859)
- Lecidea syncarpa Zahlbr. (1918)

== T ==
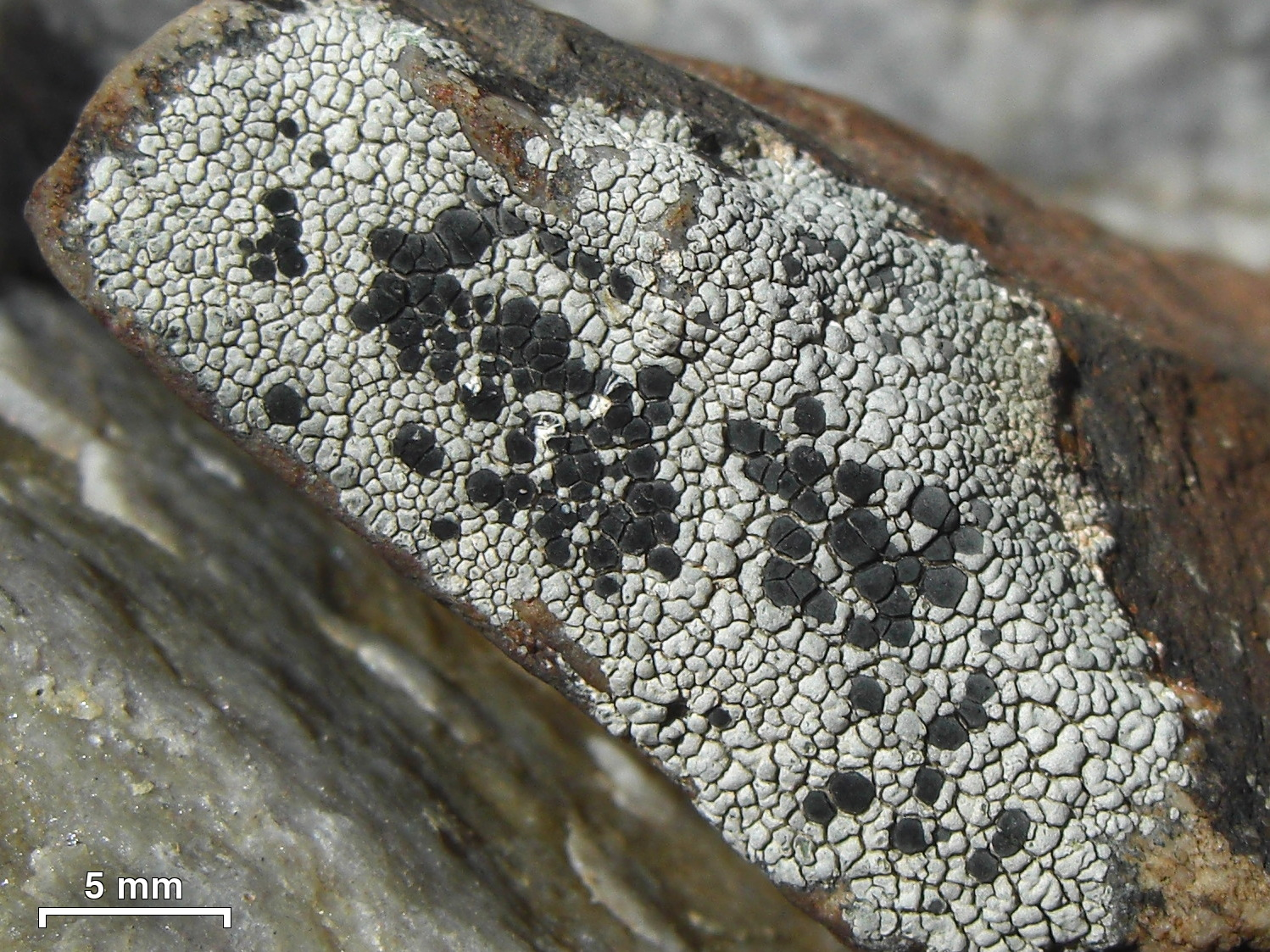
Lecidea tessellata

- Lecidea tenella Müll.Arg. (1893)
- Lecidea terrena Nyl. (1876)
- Lecidea terrenula (Nyl.) Cl.Roux (2014)
- Lecidea tessellata Flörke (1819)
- Lecidea toensbergii Haugan & Timdal (2018)
- Lecidea tragorum Zahlbr. (1936)
- Lecidea trapelioides Printzen (2004)
- Lecidea turgidula Fr. (1824)

== U ==
- Lecidea umbonata (Hepp) Mudd (1861)
- Lecidea uniformis McCune (2017)

== V ==
- Lecidea vobisii Rodr.Flakus (2020)

== W ==
- Lecidea werthii Zahlbr. (1906)
