= Lecidea lygommella =

Scientific classification
- Kingdom: Fungi
- Division: Ascomycota
- Class: Lecanoromycetes
- Order: Lecideales
- Family: Lecideaceae
- Genus: Lecidea
- Species: L. lygommella

Binomial name
- Lecidea lygommella Elix (2011)
- Holotype site: Alpine National Park, Australia

Species of lichen

Lecidea lygommella is a species of saxicolous (rock-dwelling), crustose lichen in the family Lecideaceae. It spreads up to 7 cm wide with a thin thallus varying in colour from whitish and pale grey to rusty red-brown, featuring areolate surfaces with irregularly shaped areoles. Its fruiting bodies range from slightly embedded to sitting atop the thallus and black, flat to slightly convex apothecial discs. Unlike its lookalike Lecidea lygomma, L. lygommella does not produce any secondary chemicals. It is found in New South Wales and Victoria, Australia, where it grows on rocks in alpine areas.

== Taxonomy ==
Lecidea lygommella was described as new to science in 2011 by the lichenologist John Alan Elix. The type specimen was collected from Basalt Hill in the Bogong High Plains in Alpine National Park (Victoria at an elevation of 1,659 m (5,443 ft); there, in an area of exposed alpine grassland with basalt outcrops, it was found growing on basalt. The species epithet alludes to its similarity to Lecidea lygomma.

== Description ==
Lecidea lygommella forms a crust-like thallus that can spread up to 7 cm wide and is relatively thin, ranging from 0.2 to 0.7 mm in thickness. The upper surface of the thallus varies in colour from whitish and pale grey to a rusty red-brown. This surface is areolate, with irregular to angular areoles measuring 0.5–1.0 mm across. These areoles can be flat and have a roughened or smooth texture. The cortex, or outer layer, of the thallus is 20–50 μm thick, with its upper cell layer varying from unpigmented to grey-brown.

Below the cortex lies a photobiont layer, about 70–100 μm thick, comprising green algal cells each about 9–16 μm wide. The medulla, a deeper layer of the thallus, does not react to staining with iodine (I−). The hypothallus, which is the base of the lichen, can be dark grey and sometimes visible at the thallus margin, but often it is not developed.

The apothecia, or fruiting bodies of the lichen, are scattered or crowded. They are rounded to angular in shape, and range from being slightly embedded in the thallus to sitting on top of it, spanning 0.5–2.3 mm in width. The apothecial discs are black, flat to slightly convex, and either matte or coated with a rusty, red-brown pruina (powdery coating). The margins of these discs are the same colour as the discs and are initially distinct, but may become less so as the lichen ages, sometimes acquiring a shiny appearance.

The hypothecium, the tissue layer beneath the hymenium, is dark brown to black-brown at the base and turns violet-brown when treated with potassium hydroxide (K+). It is 120–250 μm thick. The hymenium itself is colourless, measuring 60–85 μm in height, and turns blue when exposed to iodine (I+). The epihymenium is brownish green, about 10–15 μm high, and turns red-violet when treated with nitric acid (N+). Paraphyses (filament-like structures in the hymenium) may occasionally branch and fuse together. They are roughly 2 μm wide, with their tips thickening to 3–4 μm.

The asci, which are the spore-bearing cells, typically contain 8 spores each and measure 50–65 by 11–13 μm. The ascospores themselves are simple, ellipsoidal, colourless, and measure 10–17 by 5–8 μm. Pycnidia (asexual reproductive structures) are immersed in the thallus, with black, punctiform (point-like) ostioles. The conidia (asexual spores) are bacilliform (rod-shaped) and measure 9–12 by 1 μm.

Lecidea lygommella does not produce any secondary chemicals. Its lookalike Lecidea lygomma, in contrast, contains norstictic acid as a major lichen product and connorstictic acid as a minor product.

== Habitat and distribution ==
Lecidea lygommella grows on rocks in alpine areas in New South Wales and Victoria.

== See also ==
- List of Lecidea species
