= André Aptroot =

Dutch mycologist and lichenologist

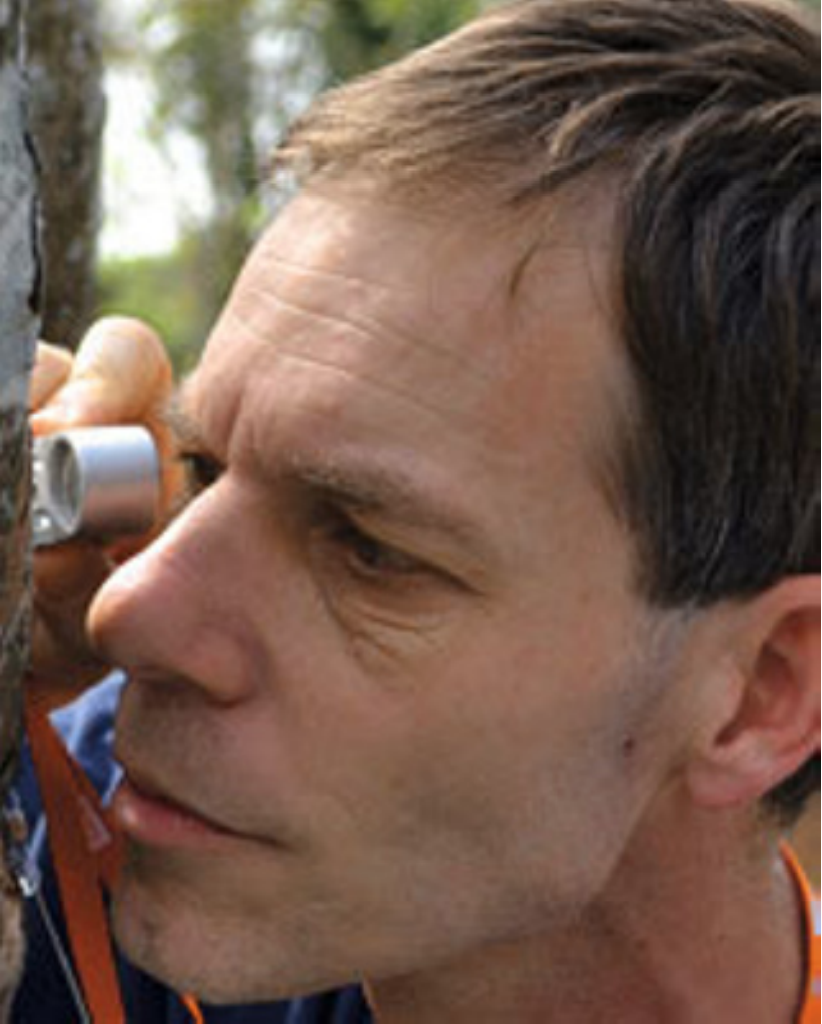
- Born: 1961 (age 64–65)
- Education: University of Utrecht
- Scientific career
- Fields: Mycology; lichenology
- Workplaces: Centraalbureau voor Schimmelcultures
- Author abbrev. (botany): Aptroot

André Aptroot (Heemskerk, 1961) is a Dutch mycologist and lichenologist. His primary research focus is on biodiversity, particularly tropical lichens, encompassing systematics, floristic surveys, and taxonomic reviews. A prolific researcher, he has published more than 500 scientific papers and described hundreds of new fungal and lichen species.

== Career ==
In 1993 he did his PhD at the University of Utrecht under the supervision of Robbert Gradstein (nl). His dissertation was titled "Systematic studies on pyrenocarpous lichens and related fungi".

He specializes in fungi and lichens on which he has several hundreds of publications to his name. He has worked as curator at Centraalbureau voor Schimmelcultures (now Westerdijk Institute).

Aptroot is the founder of the Adviesbureau voor Bryologie en Lichenologie – Herbarium (Consultancy for Bryology and Lichenology), which is located in Soest where there is a herbarium with a collection of lichens mainly from the Netherlands and the tropics. This collection numbers into the tens of thousands of specimens, estimated to represent about 10,000 species. From 2008 he has been collection manager at Pinetum Blijdenstein (nl) in Hilversum. He is a member of the International Association for Lichenology and the American Bryological and Lichenological Society.

He is a visiting professor at the Federal University of Mato Grosso do Sul in Campo Grande, Brazil, since February 2019. In 2020, Aptroot was listed among the 100,000 most influential scientists in the world according to research published by Stanford University, which utilised citations from the Scopus database. The research highlighted scientists' impact throughout their careers and in the year 2019 specifically. Because of Aptroot's broad expertise in tropical lichens, his colleague Ingvar Kärnefelt has called him "a Müller Argoviensis of our time". Aptroot is the author or co-author of three of the thirty most highly cited publications published in the scientific journal The Lichenologist from 2000 to 2019. He is also a prolific author (or co-author) of new fungal and lichen species, having formally described 775 as of December 2017. Starting with 2017 he acts as co-editor of the exsiccata series Lichenes Neotropici, together with Klaus Kalb.

== Eponymy ==
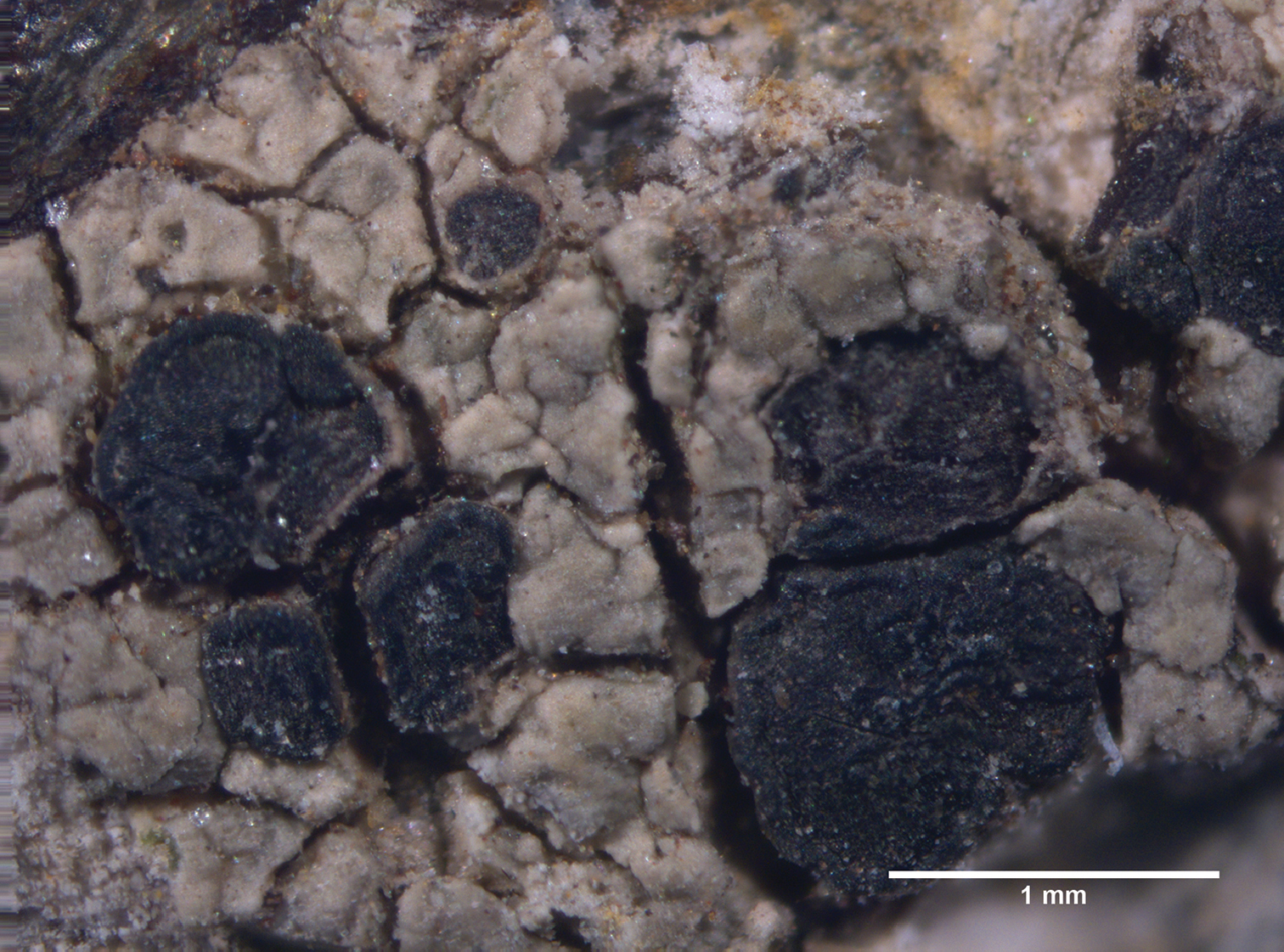
Lecidea aptrootii is one of many species named after Aptroot.

Several taxa have been named to honour Aptroot. These include the genera Aptrootia Lücking & Sipman (2007) and Aptrootidea Xavier-Leite, M.Cáceres & Lücking (2023) and the following species: Mazosia aptrootii Sipman (1991); Buellia aptrootii Sipman (1992); Parmotrema aptrootii Aubel (1992); Byssoloma aptrootii Sérus. (1993); Porina aptrootii P.M.McCarthy (1993); Pertusaria aptrootii A.W.Archer & Elix (1998); Didymella aptrootii K.D.Hyde & S.W. Wong (1999); Lecidella aptrootii Knoph & Garnitz (1999); Sclerophyton aptrootii Sparrius (2004); Alloconiothyrium aptrootii Verkley, Göker & Stielow (2014); Graphis aptrootiana Van den Broeck, Lücking & Ertz (2014); Ocellularia aptrootiana Weerakoon, Lücking & Lumbsch (2014); Sclerococcum aptrootii Diederich (2015); Myxospora aptrootii L.Lombard & Crous (2016); Hazslinszkyomyces aptrootii Crous (2017); Gyalideopsis aptrootii Xavier-Leite, M.Cáceres & Lücking (2018); Lecidea aptrootii M.Khan, A.N.Khalid & Lumbsch (2018); Pseudochapsa aptrootiana M.Cáceres, T.A.Pereira & Lücking (2018); Ionaspis aptrootii Poengs. & Lumbsch (2021); Carbacanthographis aptrootii Feuerstein & Lücking (2022); Tremella aptrootii Diederich & Common (2022); and Verrucaria aptrootii M.S.Iqbal & Khalid (2024).

== Selected publications ==
Aptroot has written more than 500 publications on the floristics and systematics of lichens and fungi.

- Aptroot, André (1995). A Monograph of Didymosphaeria. Studies in Mycology. Vol. 37. pp. 1–160.
- Lücking, Robert; Archer, Alan W.; Aptroot, André (2009). "A world-wide key to the genus Graphis (Ostropales: Graphidaceae)". The Lichenologist. 41 (4): 363–452. doi:10.1017/s0024282909008305.
- Aptroot, André (2011). "A world key to the species of Anthracothecium and Pyrenula". The Lichenologist. 44 (1): 5–53. doi:10.1017/s0024282911000624.
- Aptroot, André; Lücking, Robert (2016). "A revisionary synopsis of the Trypetheliaceae (Ascomycota: Trypetheliales)". The Lichenologist. 48 (6): 763–982. doi:10.1017/s0024282916000487.
- Veldgids Korstmossen, Kok van Herk, André Aptroot & Laurens Sparrius, KNNV Uitgeverij (2019)
- Aptroot, André; et al. (2025). "The Brazilian lichen checklist: 4,828 accepted taxa constitute a country-level world record". The Bryologist. 128 (2): 96–423. doi:10.1639/0007-2745-128.2.96.

== See also ==
- Category:Taxa named by André Aptroot
