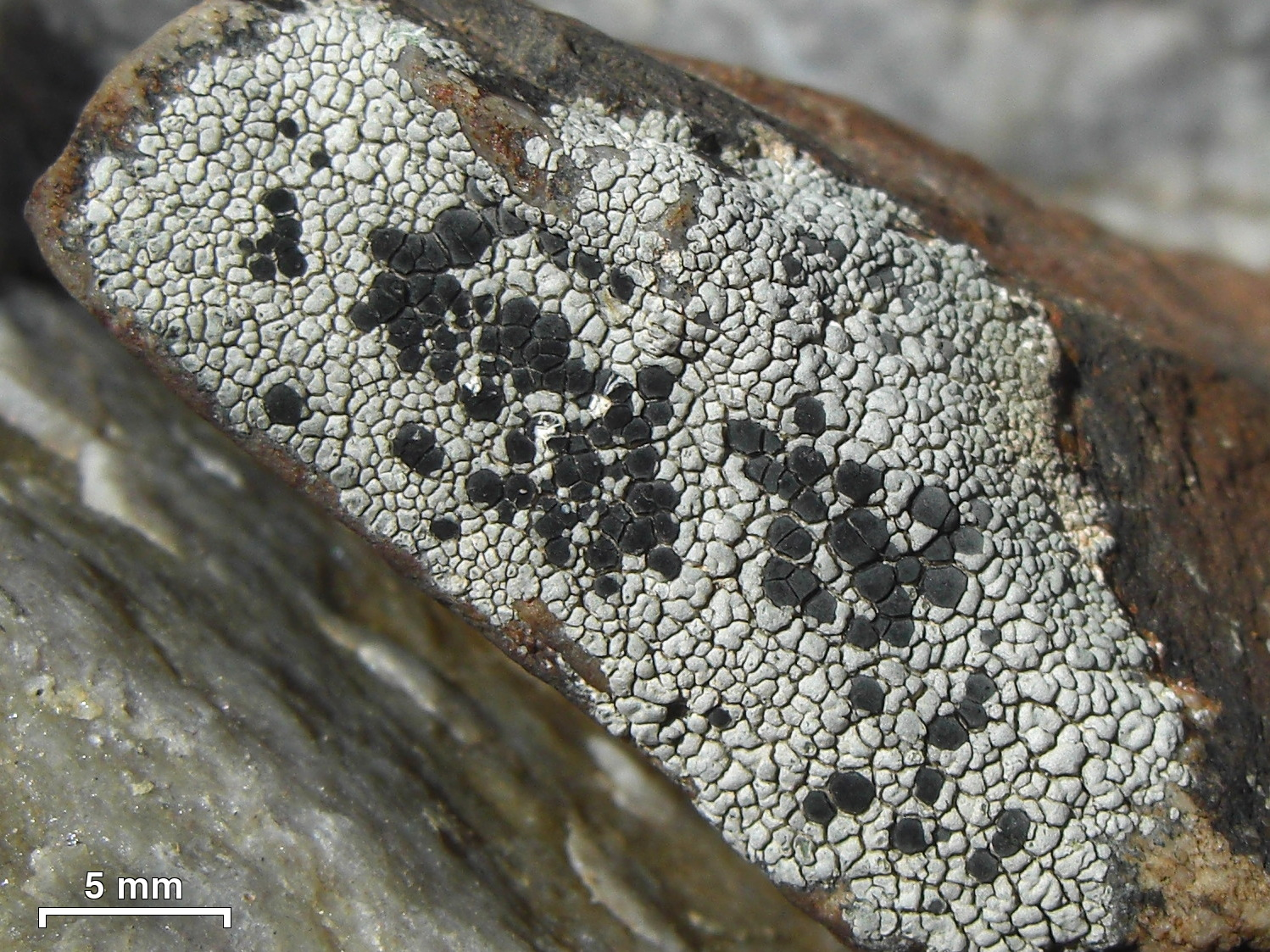

Conservation status
- Secure (NatureServe)

Scientific classification
- Kingdom: Fungi
- Division: Ascomycota
- Class: Lecanoromycetes
- Order: Lecideales
- Family: Lecideaceae
- Genus: Lecidea
- Species: L. tessellata

Binomial name
- Lecidea tessellata Flörke (1819)

Synonyms
- Lecidea contigua var. tessellata (Flörke) Nyl. (1855); Lecidea lapicida *** tessellata (Flörke) Nyl. (1861); Lecidella tessellata (Flörke) Arnold (1880); Psora tessellata (Flörke) A.Massal. (1852)

= Lecidea tessellata =

Species of lichen-forming fungus

Lecidea tessellata (tile lichen) is a species of saxicolous (rock-dwelling), crustose lichen in the family Lecideaceae. It was formally described as a species in 1819 by German botanist Heinrich Flörke.

== Description ==
Lecidea tessellata has a chalky white to grey, cracked and areolate thallus. Its apothecia are black, subimmersed, appressed to adnate and range from 0.5 to 1.8 (–2.0) mm in diameter. The apothecial disc is smooth, initially rounded in young apothecia, but becomes convex and irregular in mature ones, sometimes with a thin white pruinose layer. The epihymenium is brownish-green to blackish-green and the hymenium is colorless, measuring 40–60 μm in height. The hypothecium is pale brown and measures 30–40 μm in height, while the excipulum is blackish-green externally and colorless internally. The asci are clavate and measure 30–50 by 8–14 μm, and the ascospores are ellipsoid and measure 7–9 by 5–6 μm. Lecidea tessellata contains confluentic acid, a lichen product that can be detected using thin-layer chromatography. Both the thallus and medulla of the lichen have negative reactions with standard chemical spot tests (K−, C−, PD−).

Lecidea oreophila, found in the mountains of California's Sierra Nevada, is similar in appearance to L. tessellata, but it has a dark hypothecium and produces 2′-O-methylmicrophyllinic acid as the primary lichen product, with or without accessory confluentic acid.

== Habitat and distribution ==
In northern North America, it is common and widely distributed, growing on non-calcareous rocks. It also occurs in Afghanistan, China, Nepal, Europe, and Russian Asia. In India, it has been recorded only from the alpine Western Himalayas at an altitude of 3,450 m (11,320 ft). In Nepal, Lecidea tessellata has been reported from 5,080 to 5,639 m elevation in a compilation of published records; this reported range lies above the tree line used in the study. Its southern distribution extends to James Ross Island, where it is locally common.

== See also ==
- List of Lecidea species
