= Lecidea coriacea =

Scientific classification
- Kingdom: Fungi
- Division: Ascomycota
- Class: Lecanoromycetes
- Order: Lecideales
- Family: Lecideaceae
- Genus: Lecidea
- Species: L. coriacea

Binomial name
- Lecidea coriacea Holien & Palice (2016)
- Holotype: Holmvassdalen, Norway

Species of lichen

Lecidea coriacea is a species leprose lichen in the family Lecideaceae. Found in Europe and North America, where it grows on the bark and wood of various trees in old-growth and montane forests, it was scientifically described in 2016.

== Taxonomy ==
Lecidea coriacea was described as a new species in 2016 by Håkon Holien and Zdeněk Palice. The type specimen was collected by Holien on 13 June 2002, from an old-growth Picea abies forest in Holmvassdalen, Nordland, Norway on the trunk of Salix caprea. The species epithet coriacea derives from the Latin word for leather, reflecting the characteristic brownish, leather-like colour of the apothecia. While it is likely related to some species currently assigned to the genus Puttea, it is provisionally placed in the genus Lecidea pending further taxonomic revision. In a later publication about the DNA barcoding of European lichens, L. coriacea was considered to be an apothecial morphotype of the genus Cheiromycina, although no formal taxonomic transfer was made.

== Description ==
The thallus of Lecidea coriacea is thin and mostly endosubstratal, appearing whitish grey or pale greenish grey in fresh samples. Occasionally, it can be episubstratal in part, with a continuous or fragmented surface that sometimes has soredioid granules and yellowish pigmentation. The photobiont is chlorococcoid. The ascomata are numerous, rounded to irregular, and often tuberculate. They measure 0.2–0.6 mm in diameter, with some reaching up to 0.8 mm. The disc is pale yellowish brown to dark brown, flat to strongly convex, and lacks pruina. The margin is distinct, thin, and slightly darker than the disc. The hypothecium is about 170–190 μm high, pale yellow, and reacts with potassium hydroxide solution (K) to produce a golden yellow colour. The hymenium is colourless and measures approximately 110–140 μm in height. Asci contain 12–16 colourless, simple ascospores, which measure 3.9–4.6 by 7.3–9.1 μm. Pycnidia are rare and roughly spherical (globose), with conidia that are threadlike (filiform).

The thallus of the lichen does not react with any standard chemical spot test reagents, indicating the lack of secondary metabolites. The golden yellow colour resulting from the reaction of K with the hypothecium is due to the compound secalonic acid A.

== Habitat and distribution ==
Lecidea coriacea is known from old-growth boreal and montane forests in Europe and North America. In Scandinavia, it has been recorded at elevations ranging from 200 to 800 m (660 to 2,620 ft), while in the Czech Republic it has been found at 1,330 m (4,360 ft) and in Russia at 1,730 m (5,680 ft). In Canada, it occurs at altitudes from 700 to 1,800 m (2,300 to 5,900 ft), in Washington State at 1,180 m (3,870 ft), and in Alaska at 1,030 m (3,380 ft). The species grows on both bark and wood, often on old trunks of Betula, Picea, and Salix, as well as on conifer snags and dead branches. Commonly associated lichen species include Biatora efflorescens, Cheiromycina petri, Cladonia spp., Micarea denigrata, M. globulosella, M. prasina (in the broad sense), Ochrolechia mahluensis, Parmeliopsis ambigua, Ramboldia cinnabarina, and Xylographa species.
