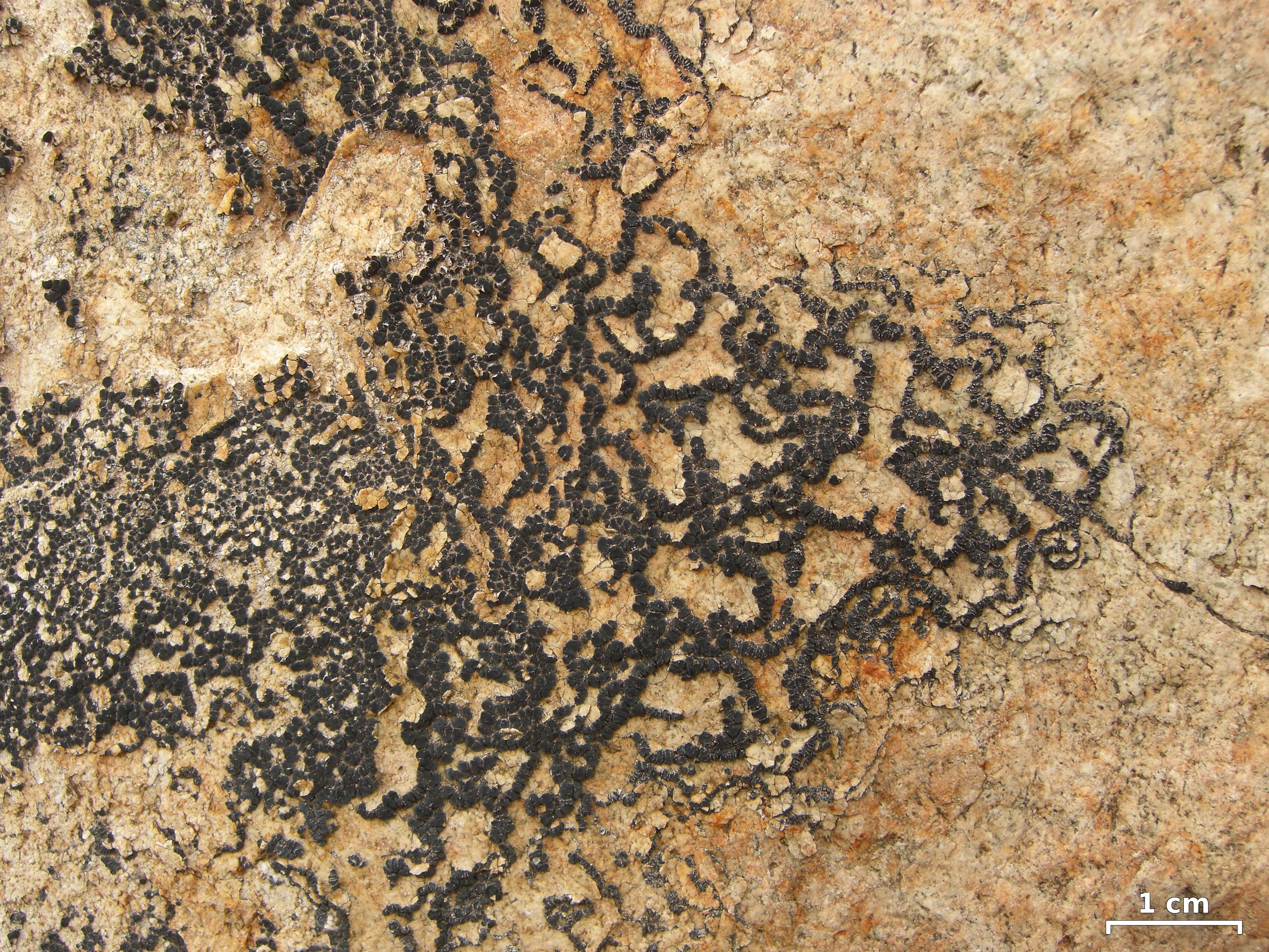
- Lecidea laboriosa on granite

Conservation status
- Apparently Secure (NatureServe)

Scientific classification
- Kingdom: Fungi
- Division: Ascomycota
- Class: Lecanoromycetes
- Order: Lecideales
- Family: Lecideaceae
- Genus: Lecidea
- Species: L. laboriosa

Binomial name
- Lecidea laboriosa Müll.Arg. (1874)

= Lecidea laboriosa =

Species of lichen

Lecidea laboriosa is a species of lichen that grows inside solid rock (endolithic), with only the small black disc-like fruiting bodies (apothecia) visible above the rock surface. Unlike other members of the genus Lecidea, the apothecia are not lecideine in that they either lack black margins (exciples) or have gray vertically striated margins. It grows all over the world in all climates. It might be the most common endolithic lichen in California.

It is similar in appearance to Catillaria lenticularis, Polyspora simplex, and Sarcogyne clavus.

It is negative to lichen spot tests, K−, P−, C−.

== See also ==
- List of Lecidea species
