= Lichens of the Sierra Nevada =

Composite organism

Lichens of the Sierra Nevada have been little studied. A lichen is a composite organism consisting of a fungus (the mycobiont) and a photosynthetic partner (the photobiont or phycobiont) growing together in a symbiotic relationship.

One classification of Sierra Nevada lichens is according to functional groups, by the National Park Service. These functional groups overlap with each other. These include forage lichens (eaten by animals), nitrogen fixers (can take nitrogen molecules from the air and attach them to other molecules), acidophiles (acid loving lichens), wolf lichens, crustose lichens on rock, crustose lichens on bark and wood, biotic soil crusts, aquatic lichens, other green algal macrolichens, and pin lichens (calicoids)”. These functional groups overlap. In this article, we include wolf lichens as a subsection of crustose lichens growing on wood.

== Forage lichens ==
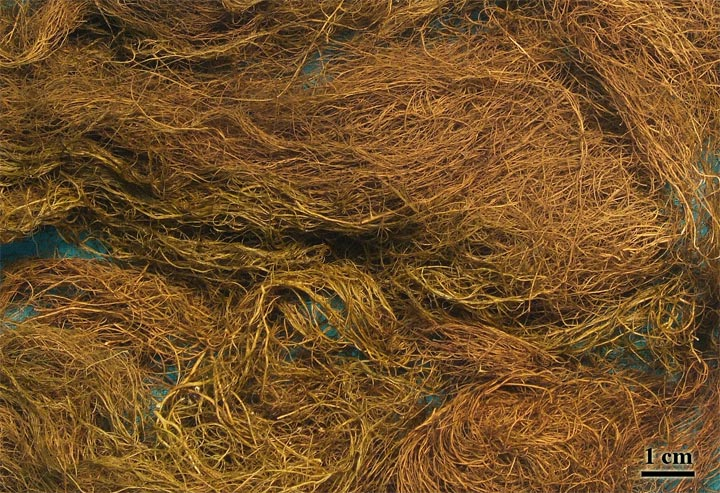
Wila (Bryoria fremontii)

Forage lichens includes hanging, hairlike species that serve as food for animals and humans, including by Native Americans.

Wila (Bryoria fremontii) is the most important species in this group. It is notable for its palatability because it lacks defensive chemicals commonly found in other lichens that protect them against being eaten (herbivory). It becomes more increasingly more rare moving south in the Sierras.

It is one of the only food sources in the harsh winters of the Sierras, including for the northern flying squirrel (Glaucomys sabrinus) and Douglas squirrel (Tamiasciurus douglasii). Mule deer (Odocoileus hemionus) may also depend on it.

== Nitrogen fixers ==
Lichens with cyanobacteria as a symbiotic partner (cyanolichens) convert atmospheric nitrogen into forms usable by plants and animals (nitrogen fixation). They are common in the relatively warm and dry Sierras, though less common than in cool oceanic climates. They are typically found on mossy boulders, rotting logs, trunks of hardwoods, and bases of trees in general. Common genera include Peltigera, Fuscopannaria, Collema, and Leptogium.

== Crustose lichens ==
Crustose lichens grow flat against the surface that the colonies are growing on (substrate), typically rocks or wood. The plant grows tightly appressed to the substrate, and is very close to the substrates at all points, forming a biological layer. There is overlap between crustose lichens growing on rock with those growing on wood, as well as with lichens listed in other sections of this article.

Among the most brightly colored Sierra Nevada crustose lichens are the bright yellow Pleopsidium flavum and Pleopsidium chlorophanum, and the orange Caloplaca trachyphylla.

=== On rock ===
Crustose lichen communities are part of the aesthetic appeal to visitors of Yosemite National Park and Sequoia National Park. They form dark vertical drip-like stripings along drainage tracks in the rock faces, resulting in Native Americans giving the name "Face of a Young Woman Stained with Tears" to Half Dome. Their tight adherence to the rocks give them the appearance of being "painted" on, and up close they appear as intricate multicolored patchwork mosaics. They often completely cover the exposed surface of the rock. They add to rock weathering. These crustose rock lichens lack rhizenes and a lower cortex (lichen).

The dark vertical stains along the drainage tracks are either mosses, or of four color types of lichen, each with a slightly different color. Appearing black from a distance, but brown up close, is the abundant Lecidea atrobrunnea. Also abundant in these black-from-a-distance stripes are Dimelaena thysanota and dark gray Rhizocarpon species. More gray appearing vertical stripes have Aspecilia species and Koerberia sonomensis as major components. Staurothele areolata and other species of Staurothele and Verrucaria appear dark brown closer up. The blackest of the black are likely Nostoc species, containing cyanobacteria. Mixed in are green to dark green stripes that contain mosses.

Nitrophilic (nitrogen loving) yellow Candelariella species can be found on rocks where birds perch and drop their high nitrogen containing waste products, as well as in drainage cracks with higher than normal nitrogen loads.

== Fruticose lichens ==
=== Wolf lichens ===
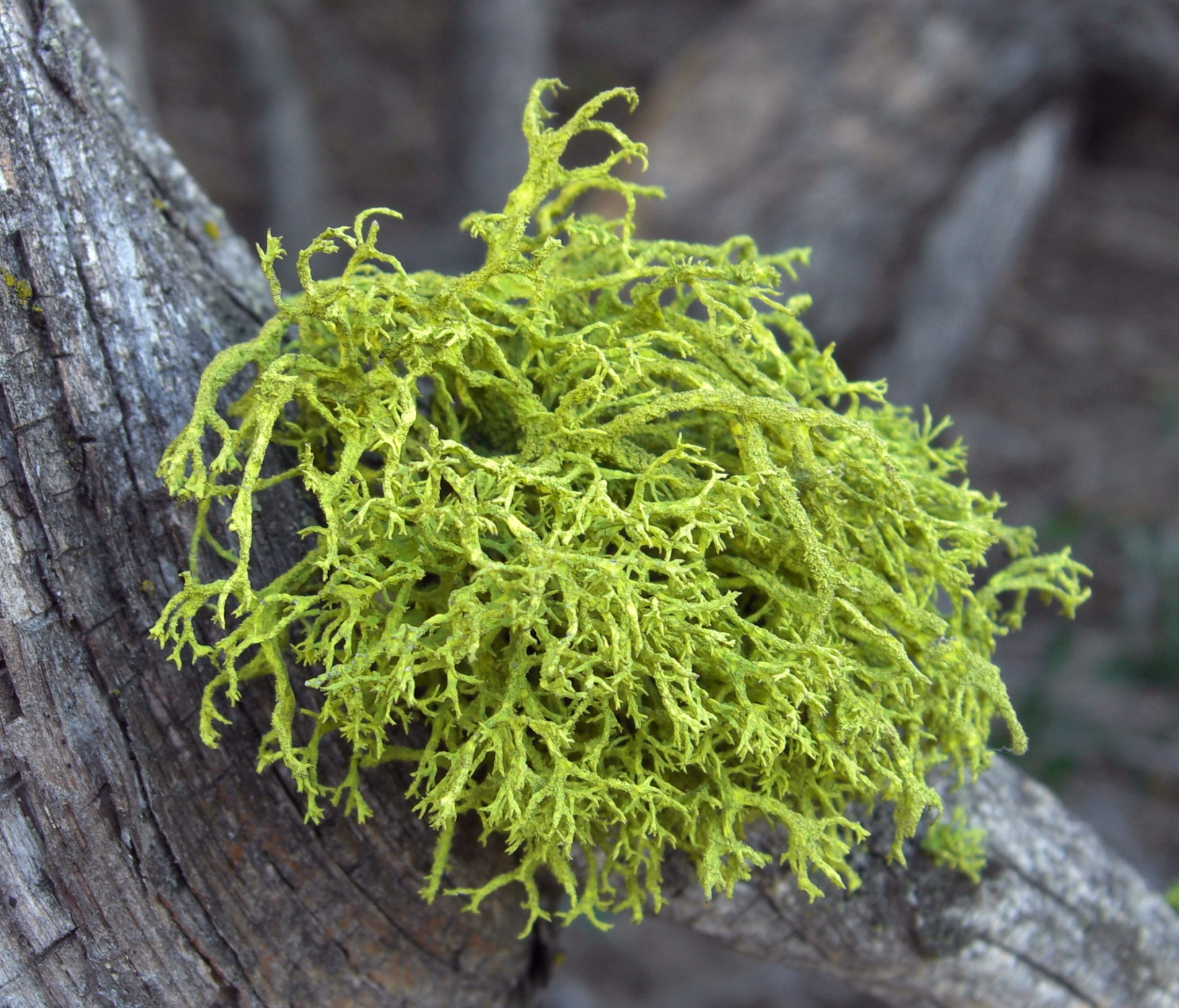
Wolf lichen Letharia vulpina)

Wolf lichens in the genus Letharia are the most conspicuous in the Sierra parks because of their brilliant fluorescent yellow or chartreuse coloration. They are typified by Letharia vulpina (vulpina derives from "fox", not wolf). They are mostly absent at lower elevations, and can then be found on conifer trunks and branches, sometimes completely covering them. Letharia is the only abundant fruticose lichen in the Sierran parks, and composes the bulk of the biomass in Sequoia groves, and many other types of groves. Estimates have Letharia species as contributing from 50% to 95% of the total macrolichen biomass in some stands.

It contains toxins (e.g., vulpinic acid) to many herbivores and microbes, although there are mixed reports on actual consumption. It is the vulpinic acid that gives it the brilliant yellow color.

== Pin lichens (calicoid lichens) ==
Pin lichens, or calicoid lichens, are lichens with a crustose thallus and tiny fruiting bodies with stalks that resemble the head of a pin, whereby the name "pin lichen".

== Ecological interactions ==
About 20 Sierra Nevada bird species are known to use lichens in nests construction.
