= Charles Christian Plitt =

American botanist and lichenologist

- Born: May 6, 1869; Baltimore, Maryland
- Died: October 13, 1933 (aged 64); Baltimore, Maryland
- Occupations: Botanist and lichenologist

Charles Christian Plitt (6 May 1869 – 13 October 1933) was a botanist and lichenologist. Species of lichens that have been named in Charles Plitt's honor are: Pyrenula plittii R.C.Harris, Xanthoparmelia plittii (Gyelnk) Hale, and Pertusaria plittiana Erichsen.

Plitt graduated from Baltimore City College with honors, and in 1891 received the Graduate degree in Pharmacy (Ph. G) from the Maryland College of Pharmacy. In 1921, the degree of Doctor of Science was conferred upon him by the International Academy of Science. He lived in Baltimore, Maryland his entire life.

For more than 36 years, Charles Plitt taught botany and general science in the public schools of Baltimore and for his last twenty years at Baltimore City college. During a portion of this time, Plitt served part-time as a member of the research staff of the Maryland College of Pharmacy. Upon becoming chairman of that institution, he gave up teaching in public schools.

Beginning in the 1890s, Plitt became an avid collector of plants and lichens. He led Saturday afternoon trips around the Baltimore area to botanize and instruct others interested in plant identification. He called these botanical excursions "tramps". Plitt kept accurate notes on each of these trips and eventually accumulated enough data to fill 29 volumes. According to The Sun, a Baltimore newspaper, he made 3,153 tramps between 1899 and 1922. (Sipple 1999) These journals are a priceless record of the varied species of plants which once grew in habitats now buried beneath urban landscapes.

Irwin Murray Brodo, a world authority on the identification and biology of lichens, reported that Plitt had a private collection of over 10,000 lichen specimens. This collection was estimated to be the third largest at the time. (Brodo 2000) In 1908, Plitt gave a talk to the Sullivant Moss Society which was meeting in Baltimore, and a year later published an abstract of this talk in The Bryologist. (Plitt 1908) Apparently some of the specimens that he used for that talk were found by Charlie Davis in little glass boxes in the archives of The Natural History Society of Maryland. After the death of the lichenologist Hermann Edward Hasse and in behalf of the Sullivant Moss Society Plitt edited the exsiccata Lichenes exsiccati ex herb. Dr. H. E. Hasse relicti.

== See also ==
- Lichens of Maryland
