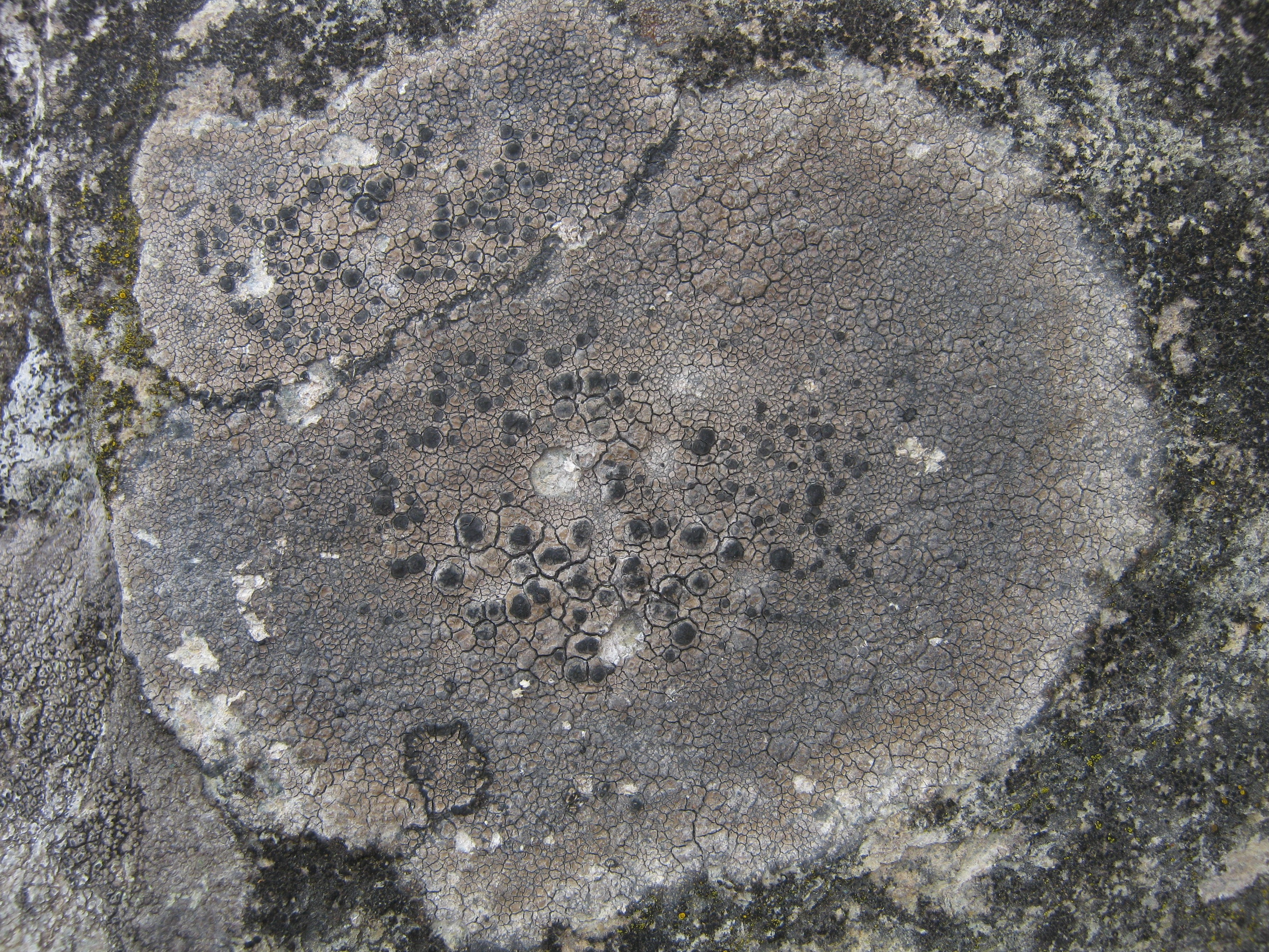

Scientific classification
- Kingdom: Fungi
- Division: Ascomycota
- Class: Lecanoromycetes
- Order: Lecideales
- Family: Lecideaceae
- Genus: Lecidea
- Species: L. fuscoatra

Binomial name
- Lecidea fuscoatra (L.) Ach. (1803)

Synonyms
- List: Lichen fuscoater L. (1753); Verrucaria fuscoatra (L.) Willd. (1787); Patellaria fuscoatra (L.) DC. (1805); Lecidea confervoides var. fuscoatra (L.) Schaer. (1828); Lecidea petraea var. fuscoatra (L.) Flot. (1828); Lecidea atroalba * fuscoatra (L.) Torss. (1843); Lecidea atroalba var. fuscoatra (L.) Rabenh. (1845); Lecidea fumosa var. fuscoatra (L.) Lamy (1880); Lecidella fuscoatra (L.) Eitner (1901); Verrucaria fumosa Hoffm. (1796); Lichen fumosus (Hoffm.) Ach. (1799); Patellaria fumosa (Hoffm.) Hoffm. (1801); Lecidea fumosa (Hoffm.) Ach. (1803); Patellaria fuscoatra var. fumosa (Hoffm.) Wallr. (1831); Lecidea fuscoatra var. fumosa (Hoffm.) Spreng. (1832); Placodium fumosum (Hoffm.) Link (1833); Psora fumosa (Hoffm.) A.Massal. (1852); Biatora fumosa (Hoffm.) Hepp (1853); Lecidea sabuletorum var. fumosa (Hoffm.) Arnold (1858); Lecidea fuscoatra f. fumosa (Hoffm.) Harm. (1899); Lecidea cechumena Ach. (1803); Lichen cechumenus (Ach.) Sm. (1808); Lecidea fumosa var. mosigii Ach. (1810); Lecidea mosigii (Ach.) Röhl. (1813); Lecidea fumosa f. mosigii (Ach.) Ach. (1814); Lecidea fumosa * mosigii (Ach.) Flot. (1855); Lecidea fuscoatra var. mosigii (Ach.) Nyl. (1861); Lecidea fuscoatra f. mosigii (Ach.) Nyl. (1861); Lecidella aglaea f. mosigii (Ach.) Lojka (1869); Lecidea grisella f. mosigii (Ach.) Zahlbr. (1925); Lecidea daphoena var. rorida Sommerf. (1826); Lecidea cyanea f. rorida (Sommerf.) Zahlbr. (1925); Lecidea spilota var. rorida Th.Fr. (1856); Lecidea livescens Leight. (1875); Biatora livescens (Leight.) Walt.Watson (1953); Lecidea prostratula Stirt. (1879); Psora prostratula (Stirt.) Walt.Watson (1939)

= Lecidea fuscoatra =

Species of lichen-forming fungus

Lecidea fuscoatra is a species of saxicolous (rock-dwelling) crustose lichen in the family Lecideaceae. This widespread species is found across Europe, North America, North Africa, and Asia. First described by Carl Linnaeus in 1753, it forms a thin crust that breaks into small, shiny, tile-like patches ranging from whitish grey to pale brown, typically outlined by a black border of fungal tissue. The lichen produces small black disc-shaped fruiting bodies that are often nestled between the crustal patches and contain eight colourless ascospores per spore sac. It grows primarily on acidic rocks such as granite and sandstone, and is particularly common in northern boreal regions, though it also readily colonises worked stone structures in coastal areas. The species can be distinguished from similar-looking lichens by its distinctive areolate (tile-like) thallus structure that forms discrete patches from early growth, and by its positive reaction to the C spot test due to the presence of gyrophoric acid.

== Taxonomy ==
The species was introduced by Carl Linnaeus in 1753, who listed it in Species Plantarum as Lichen fusco-ater. His terse Latin diagnosis reads: Lichen leprosus fuscus, tuberculis atris ('a leprose (powdery) brown lichen with black tubercles') and he noted the habitat as in Europae rupibus (on rocks in Europe). In 1803 Erik Acharius transferred the species to Lecidea as Lecidea fusco-atra in his Methodus. He placed it in his Catillaria group and supplied a fuller diagnosis: an effuse, very finely cracked, dull black crust with some flat, glossy, black-brown areoles; among these are intermingled very small, black apothecia that are plane to slightly convex. Acharius again recorded the habitat as on rocks and stones; he also compared it—cautiously, with a question mark—to Wulfen's Lichen carbonarius. He warned not to mistake the brownish areoles of the crust for the true apothecia, which are minute, sparsely scattered, marginate, and scarcely visible without magnification.

During the nineteenth century lecideoid crusts were commonly swept into a very broad Lecidea on the strength of their crustose habit, green-algal partner, and simple colourless spores, so the genus swelled into a catch-all for many unrelated lineages. In 1967, Hannes Hertel reset the genus in a narrow, typified sense by anchoring it to its type species, Lecidea fuscoatra, and by relying on apothecial anatomy, ontogeny and chemistry rather than gross appearance. In this modern use, Lecidea is a chiefly saxicolous genus, and epiphytic taxa once placed here are excluded and were reassigned to other resurrected or newly described genera.

No original Linnaean material is known for Lichen fusco-ater, and the name is therefore anchored by a neotype chosen by Hertel: Sweden, Uppland, Uppsala (Vårdsätra), 17 May 1964, R. Santesson 16.299 (UPS). Aptroot and van Herk emphasise that this neotype represents the brown, distinctly areolate morph and thus fixes Lecidea fuscoatra in that sense.

== Description ==
Lecidea fuscoatra forms a thin crust that breaks into many small, tile-like patches (an areolate thallus). The surface is shiny and whitish grey to pale yellow-brown or grey-brown, each patch usually up to about 3 mm across and flat to slightly rounded. A black border of fungal tissue (the prothallus) may outline the patches. Just above the pigmented outer skin lies a thin layer of dead, colourless cells (an epinecral layer), and the inner white layer (medulla) does not turn blue with iodine.

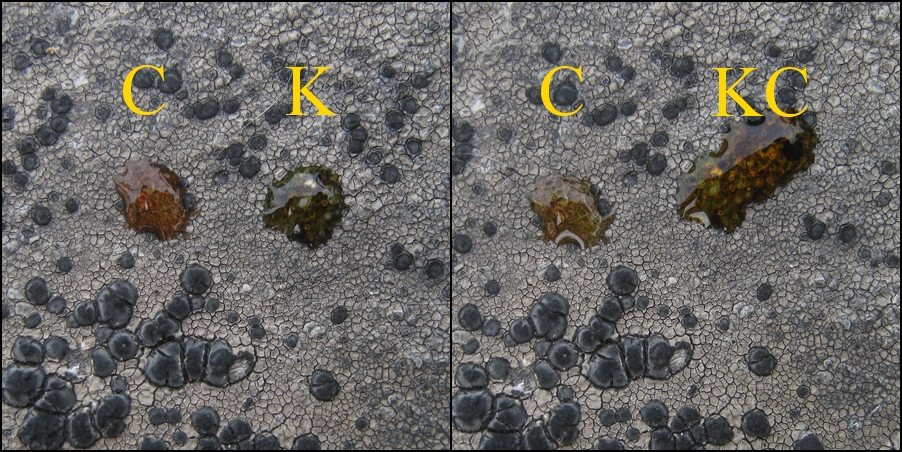
Spot test reactions

The fruiting bodies are small black discs (apothecia) 0.5–2(–3) mm wide that are typically sunk into, or seated between, the patches; they are flat to slightly domed and may be dusted with a grey frost (pruina). The disc keeps a slightly raised, persistent rim (the true exciple) that, under the microscope, is built from chains of rounded cells—brown on the outside, colourless within—and it gives a pink reaction in the C test. The uppermost film on the disc (epithecium) is olive-green to olive-brown and becomes more olivaceous in KOH; the spore-bearing layer (hymenium) is 40–60 μm tall; and the tissue beneath (hypothecium) is dark brown to black and often forms a short, stalk-like base. The supporting threads (paraphyses) are mostly unbranched, 1.5–2 μm thick, with tips to 3(–5) μm that can be tinged olive-brown. The spore sacs (asci) measure 45–55 × 8–15 μm and contain eight spores. The ascospores are colourless, ellipsoid to narrowly ellipsoid, usually 11–16.5 × 4.5–6.5 μm. Asexual spores (conidia) are very slender rods, typically measuring 7–10 × 0.5–0.8 μm.

In standard spot tests on the thallus, C (bleach) is positive red, while K (potassium hydroxide), KC, Pd (para-phenylenediamine), and UV are negative. These reactions indicate the presence of gyrophoric acid, sometimes with a little lecanoric acid. The depside compound 2-O-methylconfluentinic acid was first identified from L. fuscoatra.

=== Similar species ===
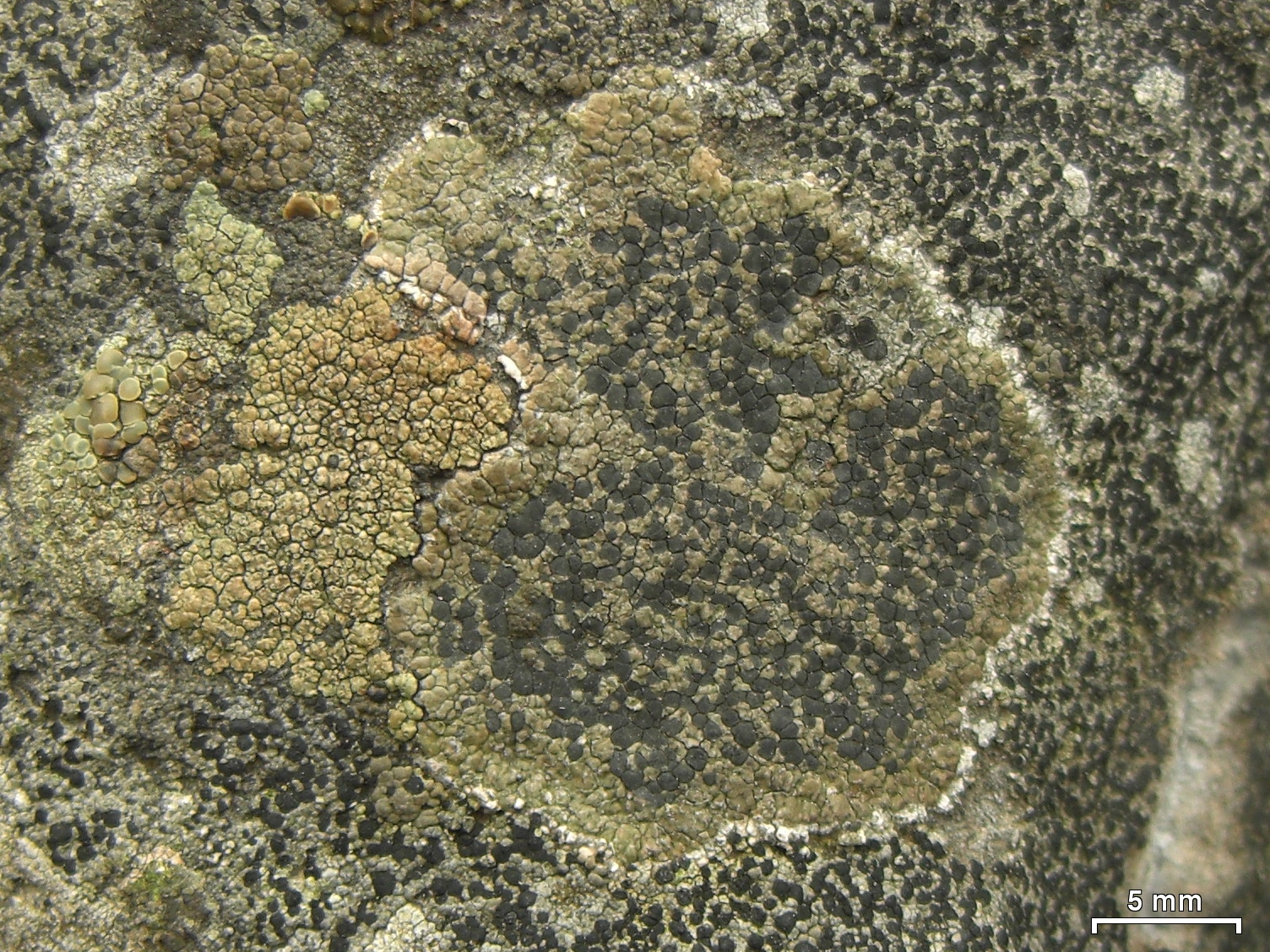
Lecidea uniformis

Field workers have often confused L. fuscoatra with Lecidea grisella, but colour is unreliable for separating them. What matters is the thallus structure at the margin and in early growth: L. fuscoatra is areolate from the outset (forming discrete tile-like patches on a dark prothallus), whereas L. grisella begins as a continuous crust that later splits into rimose plates with long-persisting angular edges. Both taxa are often found side-by-side on the same rock surfaces, without intermediates.

Lecidea uniformis (described from the Pacific Northwest) closely resembles L. fuscoatra in anatomy, chemistry (C+ red from gyrophoric acid), and ecology, and the two often grow intermixed. They are best separated by the colour pattern of the areoles: in L. fuscoatra the areoles always have a differentiated margin (blackish or greyish around a browner centre) whereas in L. uniformis the areoles are uniformly brown, lacking a contrasting edge. DNA data group L. uniformis with L. fuscoatra and L. grisella, consistent with their close similarity.

== Photobiont ==
The photosynthetic partner (photobiont) is a green alga of the genus Trebouxia, specifically Trebouxia incrustata. Cultures isolated from Lecidea fuscoatra thalli and sequenced (ITS) matched T. incrustata; the same alga was also recovered from a co-occurring Xanthoparmelia conspersa at the same Czech site, indicating local sharing of the photobiont.

== Habitat and distribution ==
Lecidea fuscoatra is widespread, reported from Europe, North Africa, North America, and Asia. Within Europe it is more frequent on natural, generally acidic rocks (e.g., granite and sandstone) and is relatively common in boreal regions. It has also been recorded growing on hornfels in the Sudety Mountains of Poland. In Galicia (north-west Spain), L. fuscoatra has been recorded on granite church masonry exposed to marine aerosols, for example at the Church of Santa María das Areas (Fisterra), where it occurs on both vertical walls (apse) and horizontal elements, showing that the species readily colonises worked stone in coastal settings.

== Species interactions ==
Several species of lichenicolous (lichen-dwelling) fungi have been recorded growing on Lecidea fuscoatra. These include Endococcus rugulosus, Opegrapha maligna, Polycoccum kerneri, Llimoniella fuscoatrae, Roselliniella lecideae, and Sagediopsis barbara.

== See also ==
- List of Lecidea species
- List of lichens named by Carl Linnaeus
