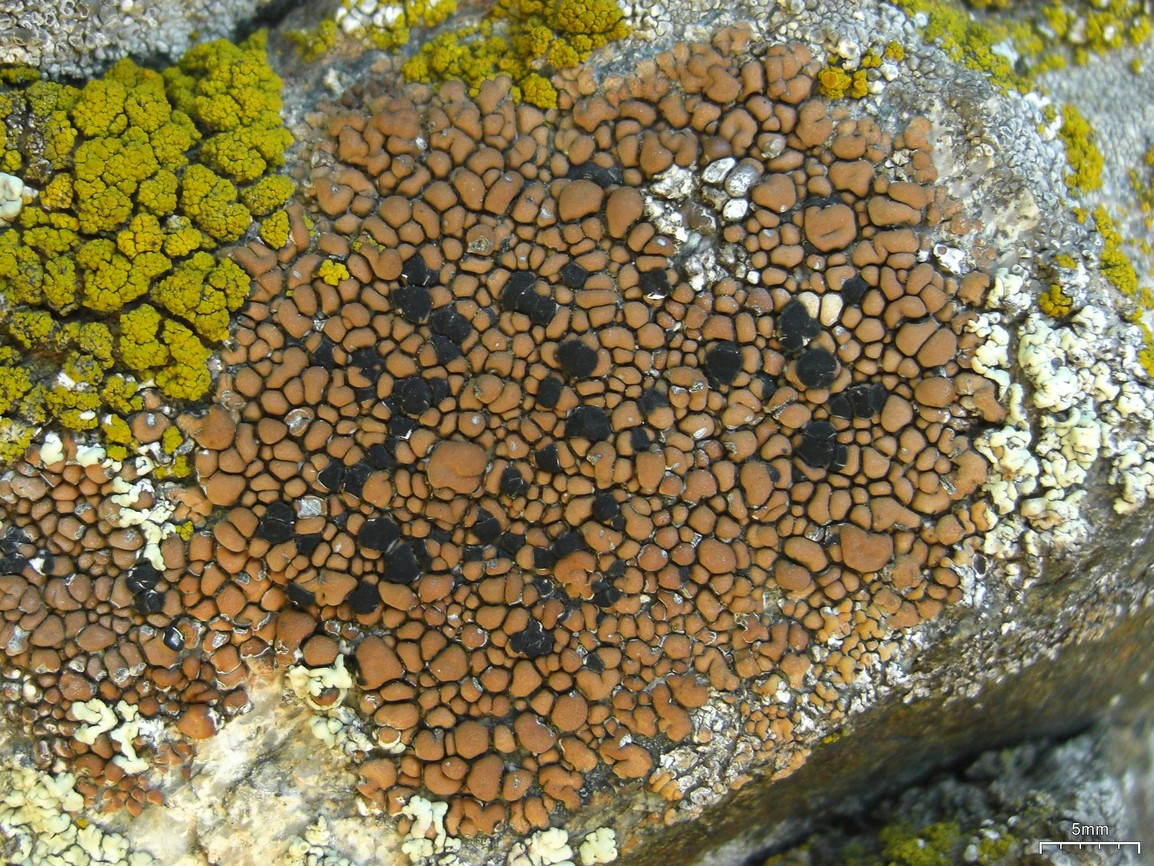
- Brown tile lichen found on Frazier Mountain, Los Padres National Forest, Southern California

Conservation status
- Apparently Secure (NatureServe)

Scientific classification
- Kingdom: Fungi
- Division: Ascomycota
- Class: Lecanoromycetes
- Order: Lecideales
- Family: Lecideaceae
- Genus: Lecidea
- Species: L. atrobrunnea

Binomial name
- Lecidea atrobrunnea (DC.) Schaer. (1828)

= Lecidea atrobrunnea =

Species of lichen

Lecidea atrobrunnea (brown tile lichen) is a group of lichen-forming fungi in the family Lecideaceae. Previously though to represent a single, widely distributed crustose lichen, recent research has shown that the name represents many unique lineages of morphologically and chemically variable lichen-forming fungi that have not yet been precisely characterized. Members of this group are most diverse in mountains of the continental western United States and Alaska. With other lichen communities, it forms dark vertical drip-like stripings along drainage tracks in the rock faces, resulting in Native Americans giving the name "Face of a Young Woman Stained with Tears" to Half Dome. This combined lichen community appears black from a distance, but brown up close.

It varies greatly in its overall appearance from colony to colony. L atrobrunnea subsp. atrobrunnea has been found to be common in very common in high montane zones and alpine zones. L atrobrunnea subsp. saxosa ("saxosa" meaning "rock") has been found in high elevations in the San Francisco Peaks and San Bernardino Mountains. The prothallus and apothecia are black, while the thallus areoles are brown. The upper surface is usually pale to dark reddish brown in the center of areoles. In squamulous specimens, the lower surface can be seen, and is shiny and dark. The scientific name atrobrunnea is a combination of two Latin words: Ater from "atro", meaning "black" and "brunnea" from brunneus meaning "dark brown". The combination of the two means "blackish-brown".

It is commonly found on rock faces in the Sierra Nevada. The communities often completely cover the exposed surface of the rock, or form intricate multicolored mosaics with other lichen communities. Its communities are part of the aesthetic appeal to visitors of Yosemite National Park and Sequoia National Park.

It is found in the Rocky Mountains, including in alpine zones, and in the United States Sierra Nevada range. It tightly adheres to the rock faces giving it the appearance of being painted on.

It is a known host species for the lichenicolous fungus Muellerella pygmaea var. pygmaea.

== Diversity of the species complex ==
The Lecidea atrobrunnea species complex has been the subject of extensive study due to its vast diversity, particularly in western North America. This group presents a variety of morphologies and chemical compositions even within local scales. Traditionally considered a cosmopolitan species, recent (2023) research suggests that what was thought to be a single, widespread species might actually be a complex of distinct species-level lineages. The complexity of this group is highlighted by the morphological and chemical variability that masks its true biodiversity.

Recent studies, using both single-marker candidate species delimitation analyses and species delimitation analyses support the notion that Lecidea atrobrunnea comprises multiple distinct species-level lineages. This finding challenges previous assumptions about the monophyly of commonly occurring taxa like L. atrobrunnea, L. protabacina, and L. syncarpa in montane habitats of western North America, which are now shown to be polyphyletic. The research also reveals narrow geographical distributions for many of these candidate species-level lineages, although sampling is still incomplete. This complex scenario suggests that the species-level diversity within the Lecidea atrobrunnea complex may be significantly underestimated. The authors suggest that the findings call for a re-evaluation of species boundaries and the total number of species within this complex.

== See also ==
- Lichens of the Sierra Nevada (U.S.)
- List of Lecidea species
