= Endolithic lichen =

Lichen that grows inside a rock

An endolithic lichen is a crustose lichen that grows inside solid rock, growing between the grains, with only the fruiting bodies exposed to the air.

== Morphology ==
Although variation exists, many mycobiont species have three layers. The innermost layer is a loose web of hyphae. The intermediate layer hosts the photobiont. The photobiont is surrounded by distended hyphae. The outer layer is composed of more densely packed hyphae and calcium carbonate microcrystals.

== Weathering effects ==
The lichen act to deteriorate the rock they are growing on, contributing to weathering of the rock. This deterioration happens among different substrates and species. This plays a significant role in the process of primary succession.

== Mycobiont Species ==
- Acrocordia conoidea
- Petractis clausa
- Rinodina immersa
- Verrucaria baldensis
- Verrucaria marmorea
- Caloplaca luteominea ssp. bolandri
