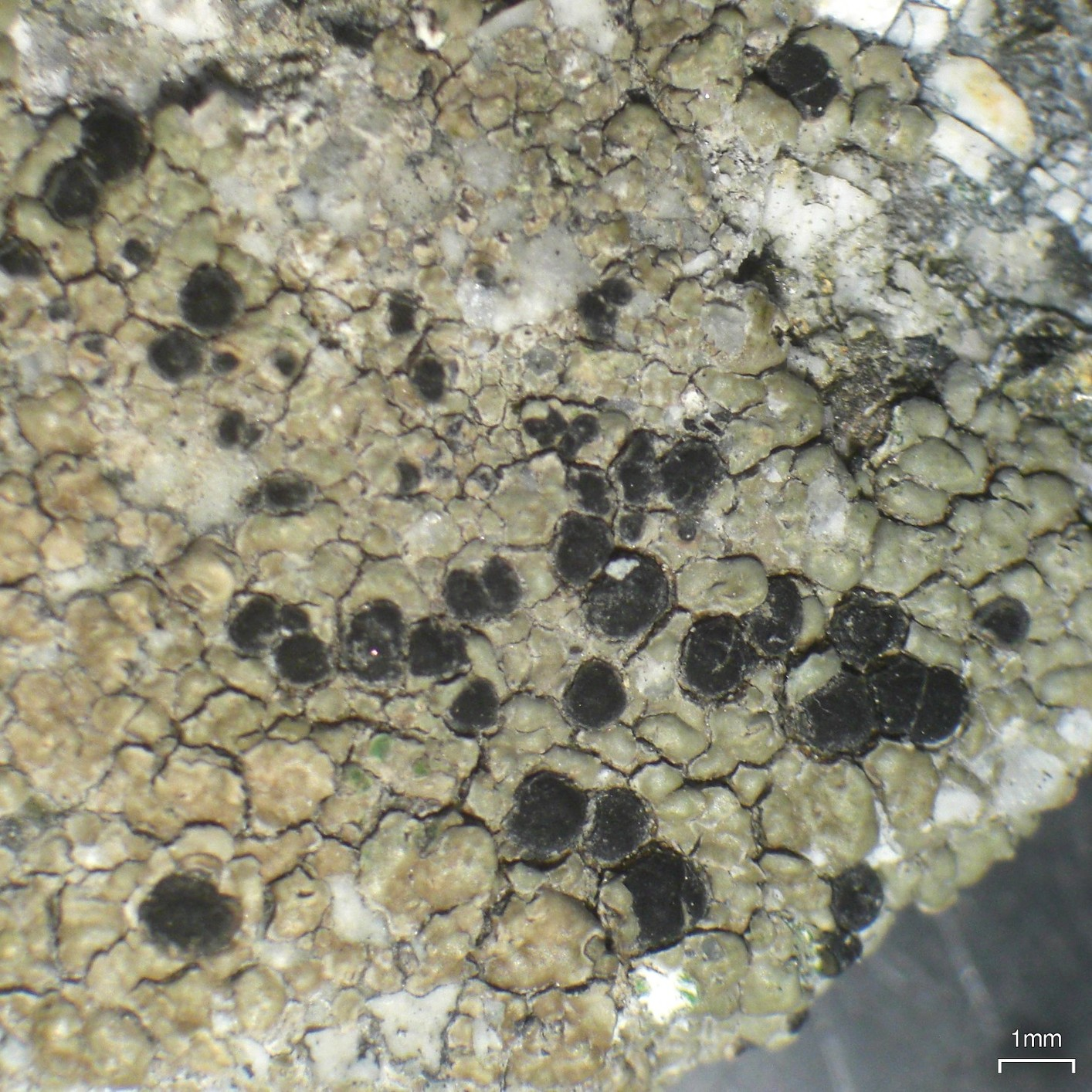
- Lecidea fuscoatra

Scientific classification
- Kingdom: Fungi
- Division: Ascomycota
- Class: Lecanoromycetes
- Order: Lecideales
- Family: Lecideaceae
- Genus: Lecidea; Ach. (1803)

Type species
- Lecidea fuscoatra (L.) Ach. (1803)

Synonyms
- Stereonema Kütz. (1836); Sporoacania A.Massal. (1855); Cladopycnidium H.Magn. (1940); Lecideomyces E.A.Thomas ex Cif. & Tomas. (1953); Nothoporpidia Hertel (1984); Zosterodiscus Hertel (1984)

= Lecidea =

Genus of lichens

Lecidea is a genus of crustose lichens with a carbon-black ring or outer margin (exciple) around the fruiting body disc (apothecium), usually (or always) found growing on (saxicolous) or in (endolithic) rock. Lichens that have such a black exciple are called lecideine, meaning "like Lecidea, even if they are not in this genus. Members of the genus are commonly called disk lichens or tile lichens.

== Taxonomy ==
The genus Lecidea was erected by the Swedish lichenologist Erik Acharius in 1803. In the original circumscription of the genus in his work Methodus qua omnes detectos lichenes, Acharius characterised Lecidea as having sessile apothecia (fruiting bodies) that are pressed against or superficial on the thallus, with disc-shaped to angular and irregular forms. He noted that the apothecia are typically black in colour, though sometimes variously coloured, and distinguished the genus by having a prominent, thick, persistent margin (exciple) that is usually black. Acharius described the thallus as variable, ranging from crustose and uniform to effuse and variously figured, and noted that some species could be foliose, somewhat membranaceous, or star-shaped (stellate). He considered Lecidea as being closely related to Parmelia in habitat and thallus form, as well as in the structure of the apothecia, but distinguished it primarily by the different formation and structure of the ascospores and the typically black colour of both the apothecial discs and margins. The genus name Lecidea derives from the Greek word λεκίς (lekis) meaning 'small dish' or 'saucer', referring to the characteristic disc-shaped apothecia. Acharius initially included several species in the genus, including the type species, Lecidea fuscoatra, establishing what would become one of the largest and most widely distributed lichen genera.

== Description ==
Lecidea species form a crustose thallus, meaning the lichen resembles a coat of paint firmly adhered to its substrate. The crust may be only a thin film or develop into a thicker layer that cracks into minute plates (areoles) or fissures. In a few taxa the thallus becomes minutely scaly (subsquamulose) or produces tiny granules of soredia that act as vegetative propagules. Colour varies from chalk-white through many greys and browns to almost black. Some specimens show a narrow, algal-free fringe known as a prothallus, while others merge directly into the rock or bark. The photosynthetic partner is a green alga of the genus Trebouxia; its dispersed cells give the thallus a fine-grained look under a hand lens.

Reproductive structures are small, blackish discs called apothecia that may be partly immersed in the thallus or sit on its surface. These discs are typically bordered by a persistent rim of densely packed fungal tissue (the exciple), whose outermost cells darken to brown and swell, giving the margin a slightly raised profile. The exciple tissue grades inward to a colourless hymenium, which stains blue with iodine. Slender, mostly unbranched paraphyses thread through the hymenium; their tips often swell and darken, creating a speckled effect when the apothecium is wet. Each ascus usually contains eight smooth, colourless ascospores shaped like tiny cylinders or sausages; they lack internal cross-walls (septa) and are sometimes traversed by a central strand of cytoplasm called a plasma bridge.

Some bark-dwelling species also produce asexual spores in microscopic flasks (pycnidia) embedded in the thallus. These release rod-shaped conidia that ooze out in moist weather and can start new colonies if they find a suitable algal partner. Although Lecidea is not rich in secondary chemistry, many species synthesise orcinol-type depsides, β-orcinol-type depsidones, or dibenzofurans; traces of the common lichen substance atranorin may also occur.

== Selected species ==
According to the Dictionary of the Fungi (10th edition, 2008), the widespread genus contains an estimated 427 species.

- Lecidea atrobrunnea
- Lecidea hassei
- Lecidea keimioeensis
- Lecidea laboriosa
- Lecidea lithophila
