= Pachyphysis =

Scientific classification
- Kingdom: Fungi
- Division: Ascomycota
- Class: Lecanoromycetes
- Order: Lecideales
- Family: Lecideaceae
- Genus: Pachyphysis; R.C.Harris & Ladd (2007)
- Species: P. ozarkana

Binomial name
- Pachyphysis ozarkana R.C.Harris & Ladd (2007)

Single-species fungal genus

Pachyphysis is a fungal genus in the family Lecideaceae. It is a monotypic genus, containing the single species Pachyphysis ozarkana, a lichen. It is a crust-forming lichen that grows on limestone and dolomite rocks in open, sunny habitats, and is often inconspicuous because its main body develops within the rock surface rather than on top of it. The species has a restricted range in the eastern and central United States, centred on the Ozarks, and is associated with landscapes that were not covered by ice sheets during the last ice age.

== Taxonomy ==
The genus Pachyphysis was proposed in 2007 by Richard C. Harris and Douglas M. Ladd, and it contains a single species, Pachyphysis ozarkana. The genus name refers to the unusually thick paraphyses (sterile filaments in the fruiting body), whereas the epithet ozarkana refers to the Ozark region, where most collections have been made.

In the original publication, the genus was tentatively assigned to the family Porpidiaceae in a broad sense. This placement was based mainly on the structure of the asci (spore-bearing sacs), which match the "Porpidia-type" and show a dark-staining tube in the tholus after iodine treatment. Harris and Ladd also emphasized that Pachyphysis does not fit well in existing genera of Porpidiaceae (or in the traditional broad concept of Lecidea). A phylogenetic analysis they discussed did not recover it within a narrow Lecideaceae/Porpidiaceae grouping, instead placing it near other calcareous-rock genera such as Farnoldia and Melanolecia.

Pachyphysis ozarkana was included in the exsiccata series Lichenes Exsiccati Magnicamporum Fascicle 2. The series, intended to exemplify the lichen biota of the central North American Great Plains, is compiled from specimens collected from Ellsworth County, Kansas.

== Description ==
Pachyphysis ozarkana forms an endolithic thallus (the main body grows within the rock), so it can be difficult to see on fine-grained limestone or dolomite; on more porous, calcareous sandstone it may show only as a thin, whitish surface film. The photobiont is a green alga with small, round cells, but it is sparse and occurs in a discontinuous layer within the thallus. No lichen substances were detected using thin-layer chromatography.

The fruiting bodies (apothecia) are black, usually 0.5–1.2 mm across, and often dusted with diffuse white pruina. They are typically sessile but may be partly sunken into the rock, sometimes forming shallow pits in limestone. Microscopically, the apothecia include strongly gelatinized, violet-pigmented tissues, and the paraphyses can be very thick, reaching about 10 μm across when the gelatinous sheath is included. Each ascus contains eight ascospores; the spores are broadly ellipsoid to nearly spherical, about 10–13 × 8–10 μm, and lack a surrounding halo. Immersed pycnidia are present, producing short, rod-shaped conidia about 6–8 × 1–1.5 μm.

== Habitat and distribution ==
In the Ozarks, Pachyphysis ozarkana grows on sun-exposed limestone and dolomite, occurring on everything from small stones to large outcrops and boulders, most often on horizontal surfaces. It is especially characteristic of dolomite glades, open rocky habitats where carbonate bedrock is at or near the surface.

Outside the Ozarks, the species has been reported from carbonate landscapes of the eastern and central United States, from the Interior Low Plateau of Kentucky and Tennessee west through the Ozarks into Kansas and Oklahoma, and southwest into Texas. It is also known from the Driftless Area of southwestern Wisconsin, where it occurs on calcareous sandstone In the original account, all known sites were in landscapes that escaped glaciation during the last glacial interval.
