= Poeltidea =

Scientific classification
- Kingdom: Fungi
- Division: Ascomycota
- Class: Lecanoromycetes
- Order: Lecideales
- Family: Lecideaceae
- Genus: Poeltidea; Hertel & Hafellner (1984)

Type species
- Poeltidea perusta (Nyl.) Hertel & Hafellner (1984)

Synonyms
- Labyrintha Malcolm, Elix & Owe-Larss. (1995)

Genus of lichen-forming fungi

Poeltidea is a small genus of lichen-forming fungi in the family Lecideaceae. It comprises three species.

The genus was circumscribed by Hannes Hertel and Josef Hafellner in 1984. The genus name honours the German lichenologist Josef Poelt (1924–1995).

Labyrintha was introduced in 1995 for the New Zealand species L. implexa, which its authors separated on the basis of an unusual thallus organisation in which photobiont cells occur in vertically aligned columns rather than in a single, well-defined layer. Fryday and Hertel's re-evaluation of Lecideaceae in the southern subpolar region showed that this thallus structure is not unique to Labyrintha but occurs in several unrelated lecideoid taxa, including species of Lecidea, Poeltiaria, and Orceolina, and even in crustose lichens outside the family. Because the defining feature of Labyrintha is therefore neither distinctive nor taxonomically reliable, they concluded that the genus cannot be maintained and reduced it to synonymy with Poeltidea, transferring the type species as Poeltidea implexa.

== Species ==
- Poeltidea implexa (Malcolm, Elix & Owe-Larss.) Hertel & Fryday (2014)
- Poeltidea inspersa Fryday (2014)
- Poeltidea perusta (Nyl.) Hertel & Hafellner (1984)
