= Lecidoma =

Conservation status
- Apparently Secure (NatureServe)

Scientific classification
- Kingdom: Fungi
- Division: Ascomycota
- Class: Lecanoromycetes
- Order: Lecideales
- Family: Lecideaceae
- Genus: Lecidoma; Gotth.Schneid. & Hertel (1981)
- Species: L. demissum

Binomial name
- Lecidoma demissum (Rutstr.) Gotth.Schneid. & Hertel (1981)

Single-species fungal genus

Lecidoma is a single-species fungal genus in the family Lecideaceae. It is a monotypic genus, containing the single species Lecidoma demissum, a crustose lichen. This lichen forms thick, cushion-like crusts up to 12 cm across that are dark brown to grey-brown and broken into tightly packed, slightly swollen blocks giving a lumpy appearance, with glossy black to reddish-brown fruiting bodies dotting the upper surface.

== Taxonomy ==
The genus was circumscribed in 1981 by Gotthard Schneider and Hannes Hertel. The name was proposed as a substitute for the illegitimate name Lepidoma (Ach.) S.Gray.

== Description ==
Lecidoma demissum forms thick, cushion-like crusts that can reach 7–12 cm across and vary from dark brown to grey-brown, sometimes with a subtle shine. The surface is broken into tightly packed, slightly swollen blocks (areoles) 1–4 mm wide that touch or merge, giving a lumpy, "miniature cow-pat" look. Each block is flat to gently domed and polygonal or faintly scale-like (subsquamulose). The lower surface is anchored to the ground by black fungal threads, and the green algal partner (photobiont) sits just beneath the upper cortex, its cells dividing to form packets of two to four daughter cells.

Glossy black to reddish-brown fruiting bodies (apothecia) dot the upper surface. They are 0.5–3 mm across, round at first but often merging into irregular shapes as they grow, and lie flush with or slightly sunk into the thallus (immersed or adnate). A narrow rim of fungal tissue encircles each disc when young but is eventually overtopped by the expanding spores. Inside, a clear hymenium 60–70 micrometres (μm) tall contains eight-spored sacs (asci) whose tips develop a distinctive amyloid dome and tube that stain pale to deep blue in iodine. The slender, colourless support threads (paraphyses) are 2–3 μm wide, mostly stuck together, only lightly branched near their tips, which swell to about 4 μm and carry a thin brown cap. The smooth, single-celled spores measure 12–16 × 5.5–7 μm. No asexual reproductive structures or characteristic secondary metabolites have been detected by thin-layer chromatography.
