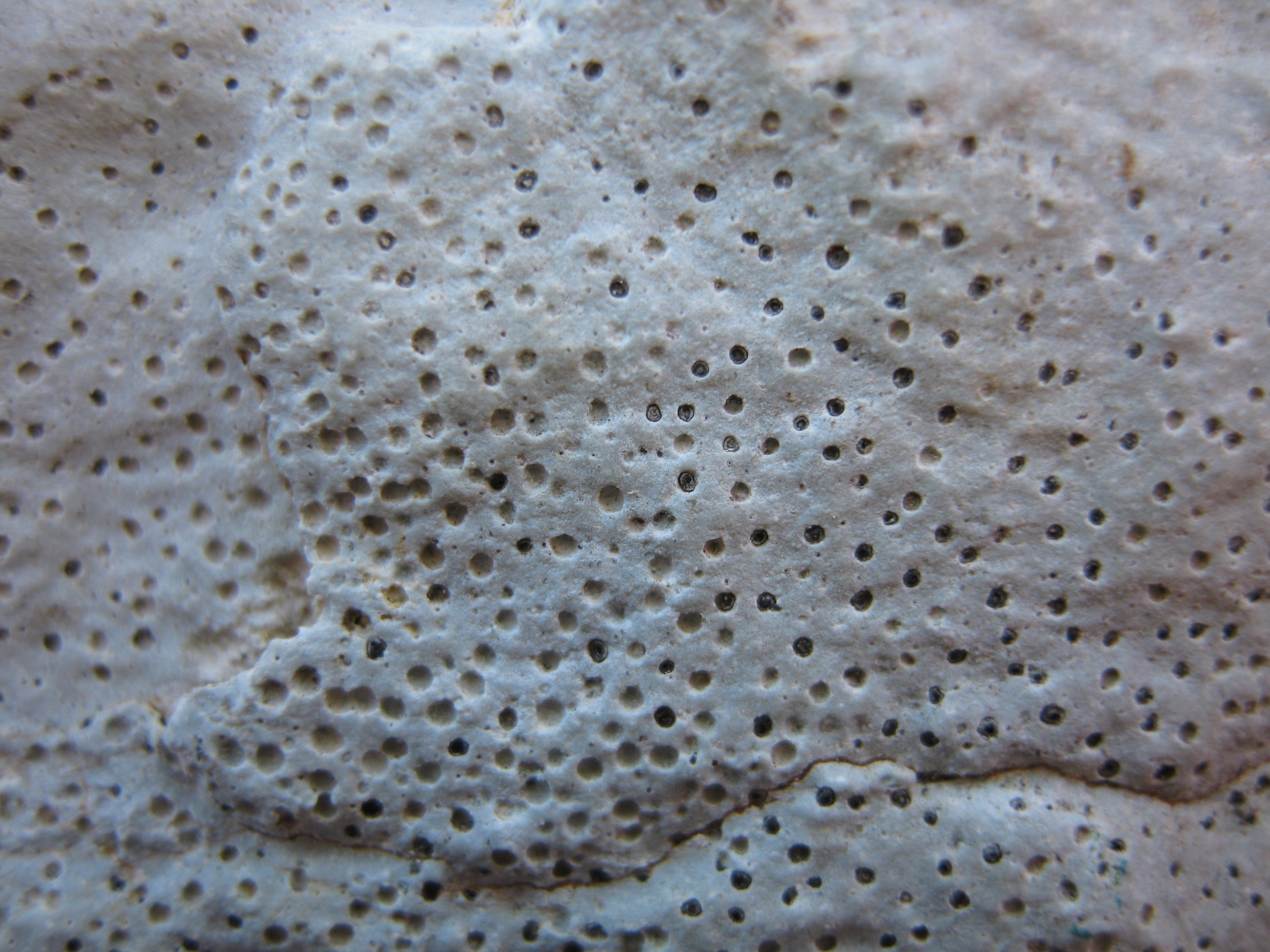
- Clauzadea immersa

Scientific classification
- Kingdom: Fungi
- Division: Ascomycota
- Class: Lecanoromycetes
- Order: Lecideales
- Family: Lecideaceae
- Genus: Clauzadea; Hafellner & Bellem. (1984)

Type species
- Clauzadea monticola (Ach.) Hafellner & Bellem. (1984)

Species
- C. chondrodes C. immersa C. metzleri C. monticola

= Clauzadea =

Genus of lichen-forming fungi

Clauzadea is a genus of lichen-forming fungi in the family Lecideaceae. The genus contains four species. These lichens grow almost exclusively on limestone and other calcium-rich rocks, often living mostly hidden within the upper layers of the stone with only a faint grey or brown film visible on the surface. They produce small, initially reddish-brown fruiting bodies that darken to black and may sit flush with the rock surface or be sunken so deeply that they leave neat pits when they weather away.

== Taxonomy ==
Clauzadea was circumscribed in 1984 by the lichenologists Josef Hafellner and André Bellemère. They assigned Clauzadea monticola as the type species.

== Description ==
Clauzadea species live almost exclusively on lime-rich rock. Most of the time the fungal partner grows inside the upper millimetres of the stone (an endolithic habit), so the thallus shows at the surface only as a faint grey- or brown-flecked film; where it emerges more fully it breaks into tiny grains or angular flakes, sometimes edged by a thin black prothallus line. The internal alga is a spherical Trebouxia-type cell layer and the medulla contains no detectable lichen products.

The fertile bodies are apothecia that begin red-brown and often darken to black. They may sit flush with the rock, rest on the surface or be sunk so deeply that, when they weather away, neat pits remain. Unlike many crustose lichens the discs have no rim of thallus tissue (thalline margin); instead a persistent brown-black wall (the true exciple) encircles the flat to slightly convex surface, which may look polished or carry a fine frost (pruina). Under the microscope the spore layer (hymenium) turns pale blue in iodine, while the layer beneath (hypothecium) ranges from colourless to orange-brown. Slender paraphyses branch and sometimes fuse; their tips swell a little and often take up the same brown pigment as the disc. Each club-shaped ascus is of the Porpidia type and contains eight smooth, single-celled ascospores that are ellipsoid to pear-shaped and wrapped in a transparent gelatinous coat when young.

Minute, flask-shaped pycnidia are occasionally present; these asexual organs sit partly below the surface and produce short, rod-shaped conidia from chains of budding cells. The endolithic thallus, uniform brown apothecia, lime-loving ecology and distinctive conidial stage together separate Clauzadea from its close crustose relatives Amygdalaria and Porpidia, as well as from superficially similar Verrucaria species seen in the field.

== Habitat and distribution ==
Clauzadea is confined exclusively to calcareous rocks, where it forms crustose thalli that are frequently immersed in the substratum and often barely apparent. The genus shows a strong ecological preference for limestone and other calcium-rich substrates, distinguishing it from many other rock-dwelling lichen genera. Species may colonise exposed limestone outcrops in various environments, from wet heathland-moorland to subalpine grasslands.

The genus has a primarily Northern Hemisphere distribution, though it extends into the Southern Hemisphere with records from the southern Australian mainland and Tasmania. Clauzadea monticola is reported to be cosmopolitan on calcareous substrata, whilst C. immersa is described as widespread in the Northern Hemisphere.

== Species ==
As of June 2025, Species Fungorum (in the Catalogue of Life) accept four species of Clauzadea:

- Clauzadea chondrodes (A.Massal.) Clauzade & Cl.Roux ex Hafellner & Türk (2001)
- Clauzadea immersa (Hoffm.) Hafellner & Bellem. (1984)
- Clauzadea metzleri (Körb.) Clauzade & Cl.Roux ex D.Hawksw. (1992)
- Clauzadea monticola (Ach.) Hafellner & Bellem. (1984)
