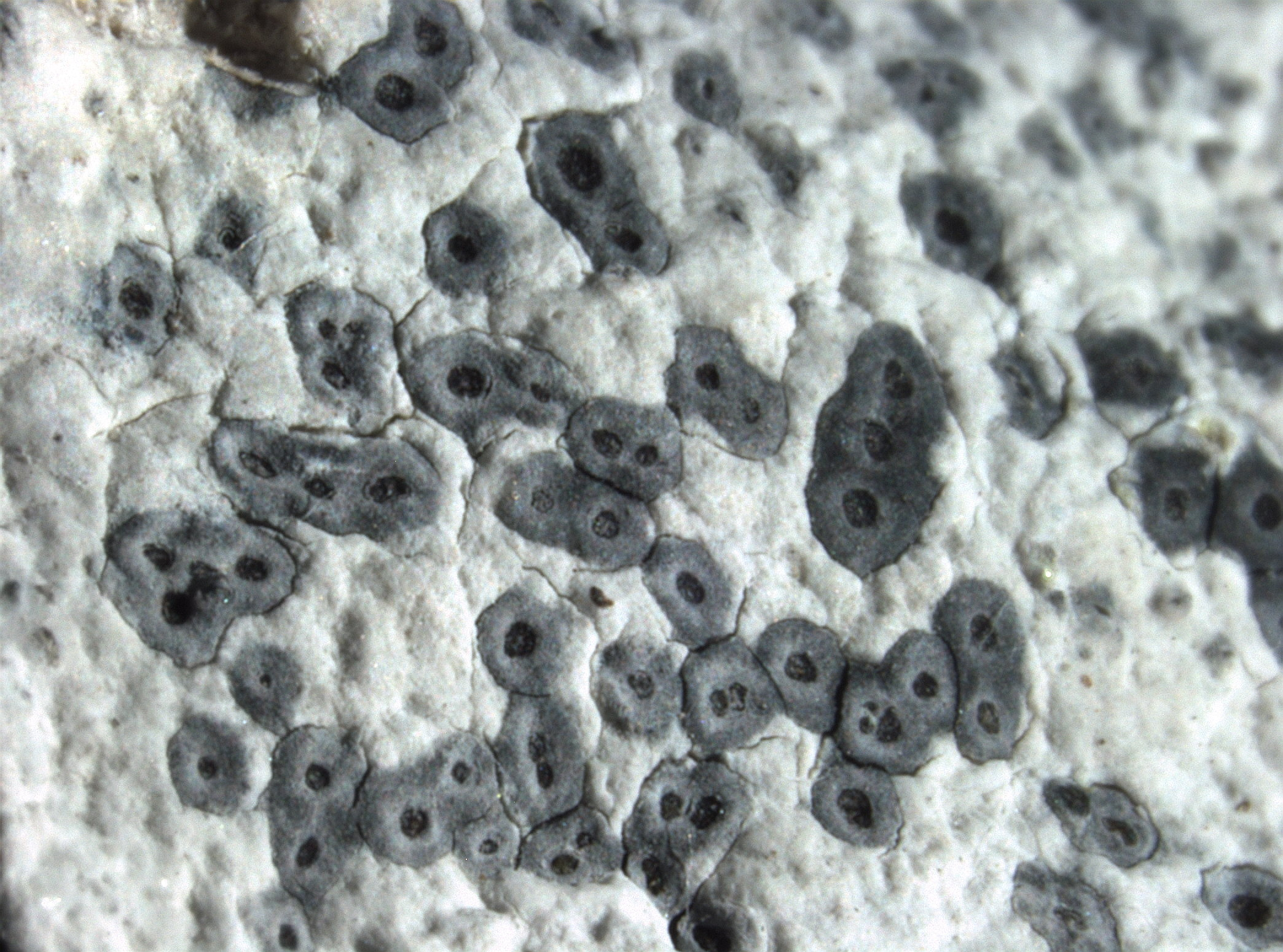
- Stenhammarella turgida

Scientific classification
- Kingdom: Fungi
- Division: Ascomycota
- Class: Lecanoromycetes
- Order: Lecideales
- Family: Lecideaceae
- Genus: Stenhammarella; Hertel (1967)
- Species: S. turgida

Binomial name
- Stenhammarella turgida (Ach.) Hertel (1967)

Synonyms
- List: Biatora turgida Ach. (1810); Lecidea albocaerulescens var. turgida (Ach.) Ach. (1814); Patellaria albocaerulescens var. turgida (Ach.) Duby (1830); Lecidea turgida (Ach.) A.Dietr. (1846); Stenhammara turgida (Ach.) Körb. (1855); Lecidea contigua var. turgida (Ach.) Nyl. (1855); Lecidea calcarea var. turgida (Ach.) Boistel (1903); Porpidia turgida (Ach.) Cl.Roux & P.Clerc (2004)

= Stenhammarella =

Single-species lichen genus

Stenhammarella is a fungal genus that contains a single species, Stenhammarella turgida, a saxicolous (rock-dwelling) crustose lichen. This lichen grows on limestone rocks in alpine environments and is found in Europe and China. It was first described in 1810 by the Swedish lichenologist Erik Acharius, the "father of lichenology". The lichen has a chalky, greyish body (the thallus) with distinctive reproductive structures (apothecia) that change appearance as the organism matures. Initially classified under various names and genera, it was given its own genus, Stenhammarella, in 1967. Modern genetic studies have placed it in the Lecideaceae family of fungi, revealing its close relationship to lichens in the genus Porpidia.

== Systematics ==
=== Historical taxonomy ===
This species was first formally described by the Swedish lichenologist Erik Acharius in 1810. He initially classified it in the genus Biatora. In his description of Biatora turgida, Acharius provided an account of the lichen's morphological features and emphasised the care required to correctly identify it. He noted that B. turgida grows on rocks in the mountain forests of Vallis Freniere, Switzerland, a location documented by the collector Johann Christoph Schleicher. Acharius described the lichen's crust as somewhat thick, slightly raised, and either white or ash-coloured. The apothecia (fruiting bodies) he noted to be relatively large, scattered and with a circular shape and swollen appearance. These structures are embedded in the crust, surrounded by a thick, black, and entire margin that is elevated above the crust's surface. The disc of the apothecia, which is depressed within this margin, is whitish or ash-coloured with a pruinose (powdery) texture. Acharius pointed out that, at first glance, the lichen might resemble species from other genera such as Lecidea, Gyalecta, or Urceolaria, but he cautioned against this misidentification.

A few years later in 1814, Acharius considered the taxon as a variety of Lecidea albocaerulescens. In the following decades, as different authors published differing opinions about its correct classification, it was shuffled to several different genera, or considered by some as a subtaxon of an existing species. In 1967, Hannes Hertel proposed the new monospecific genus Stenhammerella to contain the species. This arrangement has largely endured in subsequent overviews of fungal classification, although an alternate placement in the genus Porpidia was suggested in 2004.

=== Classification ===
The taxonomic placement of this species has evolved over time. Initially, it was considered as incertae sedis (of uncertain placement) within the class Lecanoromycetes, lacking a definitive familial assignment. However, subsequent genetic analyses have provided clarity, demonstrating that placement in the family Lecideaceae is appropriate. Further research has led to a refined understanding of its phylogenetic relationships. In one particular analysis, the species was found to occupy a position at the basal part of a clade containing several Porpidia species, suggesting a close evolutionary relationship with this genus.

== Description ==
In its early stages of growth, the apothecia (the fruiting bodies where spores are produced) of Stenhammarella turgida are completely embedded within the chalky, greyish thallus (the main body of the lichen). These young apothecia have a broad, flat margin that resembles an involucrellum—a protective covering found in some lichens. The central disc of the apothecium is black and relatively small. As the lichen matures, the margins of the apothecia become less prominent, making them look similar to those of Porpidia species. The ascospores, which are the reproductive spores, are quite large, measuring 28–30 micrometres in length, and the hypothecium, the layer beneath the apothecia, is significantly reduced.

== Habitat and distribution ==
Stenhammarella turgida is only known to grow on calcareous rocks in alpine habitats. It is found in Europe and China.
