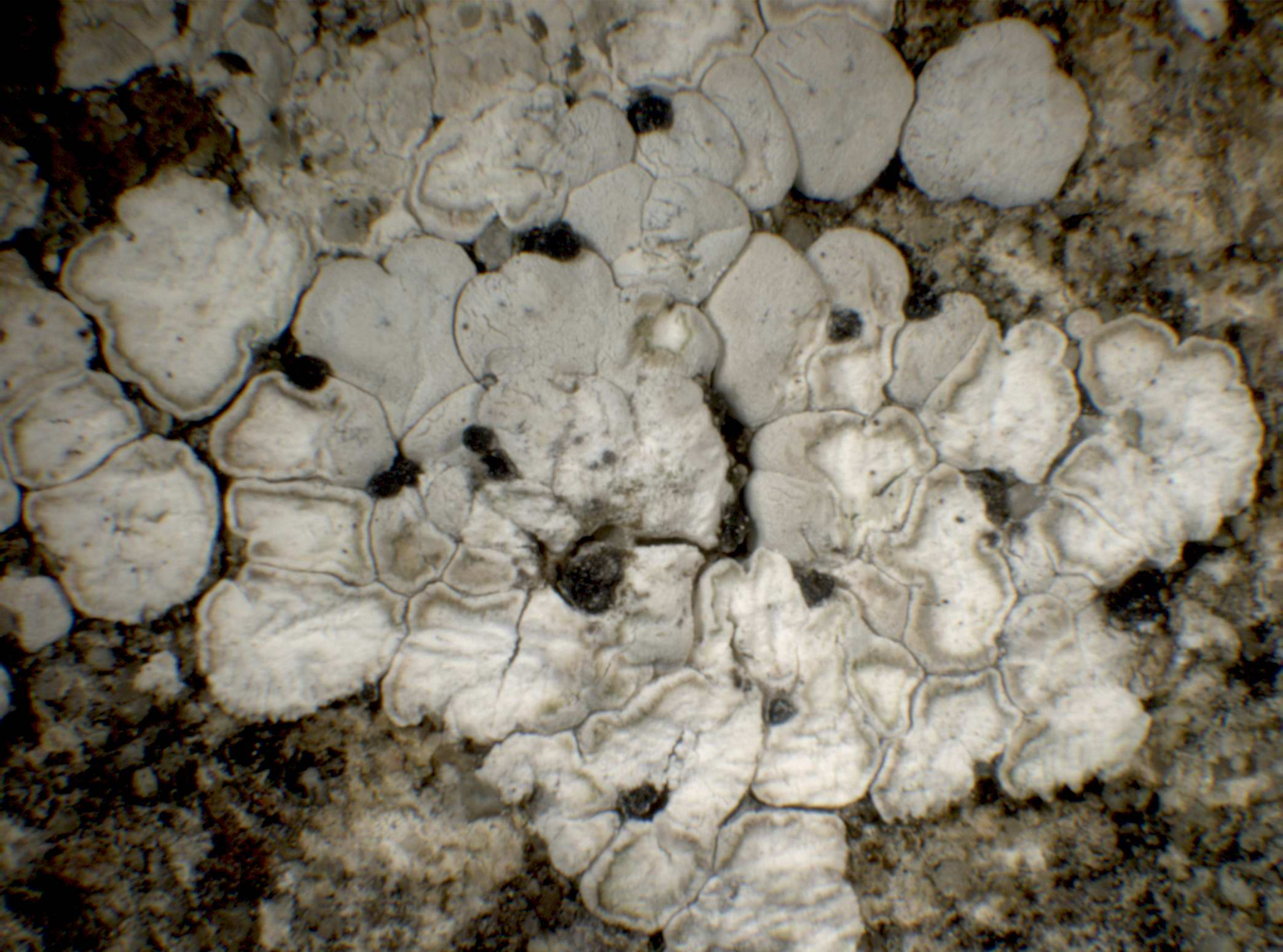
- Porpidinia tumidula

Scientific classification
- Domain: Eukaryota
- Kingdom: Fungi
- Division: Ascomycota
- Class: Lecanoromycetes
- Order: Lecideales
- Family: Lecideaceae
- Genus: Porpidinia; Timdal (2010)

Type species
- Porpidinia tumidula (Sm.) Timdal (2010)

Species
- P. brevispora P. tumidula

= Porpidinia =

Genus of lichens

Porpidinia is a genus of lichen-forming fungi in the family Lecideaceae. It has two species of saxicolous (rock-dwelling) lichens. The type species of the genus, Porpidinia tumidula, thrives in a variety of settings from coastal to mountainous areas, primarily on lime-rich rocks, and is widely spread across southern to northern Europe, northern Africa, parts of Asia, and New Zealand. Meanwhile, Porpidinia brevispora is more regionally confined, found specifically in the Sikhote-Alin range in the Russian Far East, favouring carbonate rocks at lower altitudes.

== Taxonomy ==
Einar Timdal circumscribed Porpidinia in 2010, specifically for the species Porpidinia tumidula, which was initially categorised under Toninia due to similarities in thallus structure. However, it was reclassified because it had characteristics inconsistent with Toninia, such as Psora-type asci, a non-amyloid hymenial gelatin, and paraphyses that were more tightly bound together, topped with a distinctly pigmented cap. By contrast, the traditional scope of Toninia encompasses species with Bacidia-type asci, an amyloid hymenial gelatin, and loosely conjoined paraphyses featuring vaguely pigmented ends. Although Porpidinia shows similarities to Psora, it is differentiated by its fully developed, darkly pigmented proper exciple, paraphyses that are less tightly adhered and feature a more defined pigmented cap, along with a non-amyloid hymenial gelatin. These distinctions align Porpidinia more closely with the family Lecideaceae. Porpidinia is set apart from the squamulose genus Romjularia within the same family by its black apothecia (as opposed to dark brown), non-amyloid hymenial gelatin, a darker brown hypothecium, and paraphyses characterised by enlarged apical cells. A second species was added to the genus in 2020.

== Description ==
The genus Porpidinia has a distinctive, irregularly shaped and overlapping thallus, which refers to the body of the lichen. This thallus is squamulose, meaning it has scale-like sections, each large in size, up to 8 mm in diameter, ranging from round to lobed shapes. These scales are somewhat convex and have a pale greenish-gray to pale olive-brown colour, often covered in a dense white powdery coating known as pruina, though occasionally they are not coated (epruinose).

The reproductive structures, or apothecia, of Porpidinia are marginal, meaning they are located at the edge of the thallus, and range in colour from brown-black to black. These structures are lecideine in form, a description that denotes their non-fleshy, hard, and usually dark nature. The top layer of the apothecium, known as the epihymenium, is brown in colour and does not react to chemical tests with potassium hydroxide (K–) or sodium hypochlorite (N–), indicating the absence of certain chemical reactions typically used in lichen identification.

Beneath the epihymenium lies the hypothecium, a supportive layer that is dark brown in colour. Surrounding the reproductive parts, the exciple (the outer layer of the apothecium) contains calcium oxalate crystals, contributing to the lichen's structure and potentially to its chemical resistance. The paraphyses, or sterile filaments within the apothecium, are closely stuck together and end in swollen brown-pigmented tips. Porpidinia contains eight-spored asci of the Psora-type. The ascospores of Porpidinia are colourless, range from simple to one-septate (divided by a single cross wall), and are narrowly ellipsoid in shape, measuring between 10 and 18 micrometres in length and 3 to 5 micrometers in width.

Chemically, the thalli of Porpidinia may contain no distinct lichen substances or may possess an unidentified substance that fluoresces blue under ultraviolet light (UV+ blue), which suggests a unique chemical signature not yet fully understood.

== Habitat and distribution ==
Genus Porpidinia, specifically the species Porpidinia tumidula, is found in diverse environments, from coastal regions to mountainous areas, predominantly occupying exposed calcareous (lime-rich) rocks. This species has a broad ecological range, adapting from maritime environments, where the influence of the sea plays a significant role in the habitat's characteristics, to montane zones, which are found at higher elevations in mountainous regions.

Geographically, Porpidinia tumidula has a wide distribution across southern Europe and extends its presence to central, western, and northern parts of the continent. Its range further spans to northern Africa, specifically in Algeria, parts of Asia, the Russian sectors of the Caucasus, and even as far afield as New Zealand. In contrast, Porpidinia brevispora, has a more localised habitat preference, primarily found in the Sikhote-Alin mountain range within the Primorsky Krai of the Russian Far East. This particular species thrives on carbonate rocks at lower elevations, indicating a specialised habitat niche compared to the more widely distributed Porpidinia tumidula.

== Species ==
- Porpidinia brevispora L.S.Yakovchenko & E.A.Davydov (2020)
- Porpidinia tumidula (Sm.) Timdal (2010)
