= Stephanocyclos =

Scientific classification
- Domain: Eukaryota
- Kingdom: Fungi
- Division: Ascomycota
- Class: Lecanoromycetes
- Order: Lecideales
- Family: Lecideaceae
- Genus: Stephanocyclos; Hertel (1983)
- Species: S. henssenianus

Binomial name
- Stephanocyclos henssenianus Hertel (1983)

Single-species genus of lichen

Stephanocyclos is a genus of lichen-forming fungi in the family Lecideaceae. It is a monotypic genus, containing the single species Stephanocyclos henssenianus. This crustose lichen was formally described as a new species in 1983 by German lichenologist Hannes Hertel as part of a set of exsiccata (dried herbarium specimens). The type specimen was collected from volcanic rock found on Marion Island, one of the two Prince Edward Islands in the southern Indian Ocean. The specific epithet henssenianus honours lichenologist Aino Henssen.
