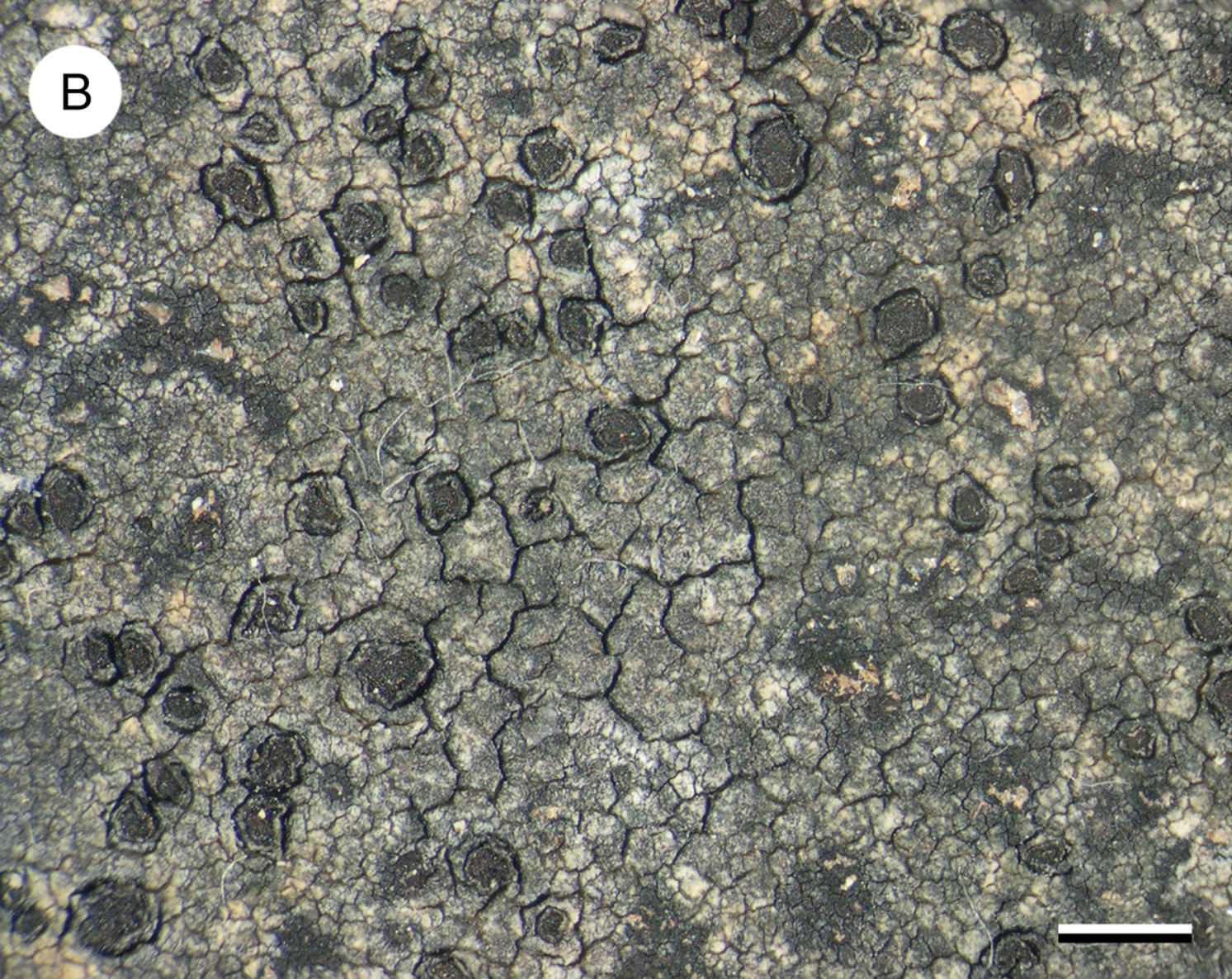
- Holotype specimen of Imsharria orangei; scale bar = 1 mm

Scientific classification
- Kingdom: Fungi
- Division: Ascomycota
- Class: Lecanoromycetes
- Order: Lecideales
- Family: Lecideaceae
- Genus: Imsharria; Fryday & U.Rupr. (2024)
- Species: I. orangei

Binomial name
- Imsharria orangei Fryday & U.Rupr. (2024)
- Holotype: Mount Adam, Falkland Islands

= Imsharria =

Genus of lichens

Imsharria is a fungal genus in the family Lecideaceae. It comprises the single species Imsharria orangei, a rare saxicolous (rock-dwelling), crustose lichen. Endemic to the Falkland Islands, the lichen can be recognised by its sunken brown apothecia (fruiting bodies) and grey thallus with its distinctive paler margin. It is usually found on or near mountain summits, particularly in areas of broken rock (stone runs) and sparsely vegetated rocky ground (feldmark).

== Taxonomy ==
Imsharria is a monospecific genus of crustose lichen in the family Lecideaceae. The genus was circumscribed in 2024 by Alan M. Fryday and Ulrike Ruprecht, with I. orangei designated as the type species. The genus was named to commemorate the lichenologists Henry Imshaug and Richard Harris, who conducted extensive lichen collecting work in the Falkland Islands during the austral summer of 1968–1969. The species epithet honours the British lichenologist Alan Orange, who also visited the islands and studied the lichen funga there.

The genus is distinguished from other members of Lecideaceae by several key characteristics:

- Porpidia-type asci
- Hyaline (translucent) hypothecium
- Halonate, thick-walled ascospores
- Immersed fruiting bodies (apothecia)
- A distinct phylogenetic position based on nrITS and mtSSU molecular markers

Initially, specimens of this genus were provisionally assigned to the South African genus Schizodiscus, as both genera share features like Porpidia-type asci and an unpigmented hypothecium. However, molecular analysis showed only 75% sequence homology between Imsharria and Schizodiscus, indicating they are not closely related.

Phylogenetic studies place Imsharria as a distinct lineage that is basal to other major groups within Lecideaceae, separate from both Lecidea and Porpidia clades. The genus forms a well-supported independent branch in molecular analyses, confirming its status as a separate genus within the family.

== Description ==
Imsharria orangei forms a thin, whitish to blue-grey crust (thallus) on rock surfaces, typically only 0.1–0.2 mm thick. The thallus has a distinctive appearance, with the outer 0.5–1.0 mm being noticeably paler than the central portions. It grows in small, flat to slightly concave segments (areoles) that measure 0.1–0.3 mm across. These segments develop on top of a black foundation layer called a prothallus, which is visible as a thin black border around the edge of the lichen.

The reproductive structures (apothecia) are deeply sunken below the surface of the thallus. They appear as brown, disc-like depressions typically surrounded by a crack that separates them from the surrounding thallus. Initially round and measuring 0.4–0.6 mm in diameter, they can become irregular or elongated as they develop, sometimes forming slit-like shapes up to 0.7 mm long. Each apothecium has a thin, raised rim (proper margin) that is black or grey with a white inner edge.

When examined microscopically, the thallus shows several distinct layers. The upper surface layer (cortex) is mostly colourless except for its uppermost portion, which contains a blue-black pigment. Below this lies a layer containing the photobiont (green algal partner) in clusters, rather than forming a continuous sheet. The internal layer (medulla) is composed of loosely interwoven colourless filaments (hyphae) and turns violet when stained with iodine solution, a distinctive chemical reaction that helps identify this species.

The spore-producing structures (asci) are cylindrical and contain simple, colourless spores. These spores are surrounded by a gelatinous coating (perispore) that becomes more visible when treated with certain chemicals. When tested with chemical spot tests, the lichen shows a distinctive red reaction with potassium hydroxide solution (K) due to the presence of norstictic acid, a characteristic lichen product.

== Habitat and distribution ==
Imsharria orangei is endemic to the Falkland Islands, where it is known only from rocky outcrops at or near mountain summits. The species has been documented at several locations across both East and West Falkland, including Mt. Usborne, Mt. Kent, Mt. Maria, and Mt. Adam.

The lichen shows a strong preference for siliceous (silicon-rich) rock surfaces, particularly in two specific habitat types: stone runs and feldmark. Stone runs are distinctive geological features in the Falklands consisting of large accumulations of broken rock fragments, while feldmark refers to sparsely vegetated rocky areas typical of exposed alpine environments. The species has been recorded at elevations up to at least 620 metres above sea level. At Mt. Adam, where the type specimen was collected, I. orangei was found growing on rocks near a tarn (mountain lake) in a southwestern cirque.
