= Melanolecia =

Scientific classification
- Domain: Eukaryota
- Kingdom: Fungi
- Division: Ascomycota
- Class: Lecanoromycetes
- Order: Lecideales
- Family: Lecideaceae
- Genus: Melanolecia; Hertel (1981)
- Species: M. transitoria

Binomial name
- Melanolecia transitoria (Arnold) Hertel (1981)

Synonyms
- Lecidea transitoria Arnold (1870); Tremolecia transitoria (Arnold) Hertel (1977)

Single-species lichen genus

Melanolecia is a fungal genus in the family Lecideaceae. It contains the single species Melanolecia transitoria, a saxicolous (rock-dwelling) crustose lichen.

== Taxonomy ==
The genus was circumscribed by the German lichenologist Hannes Hertel in 1981 to contain calcicolous (i.e., thriving on lime-rich substrates) species of the Lecidea jurana-group that were excluded from the genus Tremolecia.

The genus is treated as monospecific by the taxonomic authority Index Fungorum, with the type species, Melanolecia transitoria, the only species associated with the genus in its Catalogue of Life listing. However, six species names were proposed by Hertel; the species with amyloid ascus tips have since been moved into the genus Farnoldia.

Melanolecia is now placed in the family Lecideaceae, a classification that was suggested from early molecular phylogenetics analysis. It was historically tentatively placed in the Hymeneliaceae.

=== Former species ===
Hertel transferred species with amyloid tubelike structures into the new genus Farnoldia in 1983; this includes most of the species originally proposed, save for the type:

- Melanolecia dissipabilis (Nyl.) Hertel (1981) = Farnoldia dissipabilis
- Melanolecia jurana (Schaer.) Hertel (1981) = Farnoldia jurana
- Melanolecia micropsis (A.Massal.) Hertel (1981) = Farnoldia micropsis
- Melanolecia muscigena (Vězda) Hertel (1981) = Farnoldia muscigena
- Melanolecia similigena (Nyl.) Hertel (1981) = Farnoldia similigena

== Habitat and distribution ==
Melanolecia transitoria is a circumpolar lichen that grows in arctic-alpine environments. It typically grows on sloped to overhanging surfaces of calcareous rocks found above the treeline. In the Alps, this species is primarily found in the nival belt, the highest zone of alpine vegetation, where it is likely restricted.
