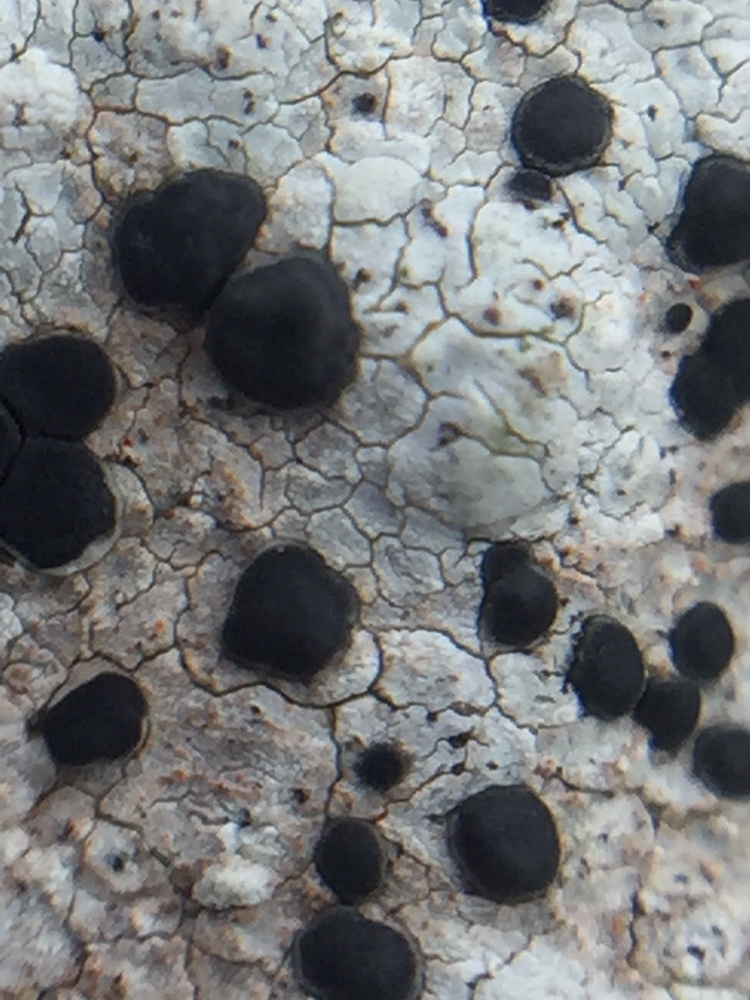
- Paraporpidia leptocarpa

Scientific classification
- Kingdom: Fungi
- Division: Ascomycota
- Class: Lecanoromycetes
- Order: Lecideales
- Family: Lecideaceae
- Genus: Paraporpidia; Rambold & Pietschm. (1989)

Type species
- Paraporpidia aboriginum Rambold

Species
- P. aboriginum P. glauca P. leptocarpa

= Paraporpidia =

Genus of lichens

Paraporpidia is a genus of lichen-forming fungi in the family Lecideaceae. It has three species of saxicolous (rock-dwelling) crustose lichens. The genus was circumscribed by Gerhard Rambold and M. Pietschmann in 1989, with Paraporpidia aboriginum assigned as the type species.

== Species ==
- Paraporpidia aboriginum Rambold (1989)
- Paraporpidia glauca (Taylor) Rambold (1989)
- Paraporpidia leptocarpa (Nyl.) Rambold & Hertel (1989)

A fourth species, Paraporpidia neotropica, was proposed by André Aptroot and Felix Schumm in 2023. It occurs in Brazil.
