= Koerberiella =

Scientific classification
- Domain: Eukaryota
- Kingdom: Fungi
- Division: Ascomycota
- Class: Lecanoromycetes
- Order: Lecideales
- Family: Lecideaceae
- Genus: Koerberiella; Stein

Type species
- Koerberiella wimmeriana (Körb.) Stein

Genus of fungi

Koerberiella is a genus of lichenized fungi within the Lecideaceae family.

The genus name of Koerberiella is in honour of Gustav Wilhelm Körber (1817–1885), who was a German lichenologist.

The genus was circumscribed by Berthold Stein in Krypt. Fl. Schlesien vol.2 (issue 2) on page 143 in 1879.
