= Lopacidia =

Scientific classification
- Domain: Eukaryota
- Kingdom: Fungi
- Division: Ascomycota
- Class: Lecanoromycetes
- Order: Lecideales
- Family: Lecideaceae
- Genus: Lopacidia; Kalb (1984)
- Species: L. multilocularis

Binomial name
- Lopacidia multilocularis (Müll.Arg.) Kalb (1984)

Genus of fungi

Lopacidia is a genus of fungi in the family Lecideaceae. This is a monotypic genus, containing the single species Lopacidia multilocularis, a foliicolous (lead-dwelling) lichen.
