= Cyclohymenia =

Scientific classification
- Domain: Eukaryota
- Kingdom: Fungi
- Division: Ascomycota
- Class: Lecanoromycetes
- Order: Lecideales
- Family: Lecideaceae
- Genus: Cyclohymenia; McCune & M.J.Curtis (2017)
- Species: C. epilithica

Binomial name
- Cyclohymenia epilithica McCune & M.J.Curtis (2017)

Single-species lichen genus

Cyclohymenia is a fungal genus in the family Lecideaceae. It contains the single species Cyclohymenia epilithica, a saxicolous (rock-dwelling) crustose lichen found in western North America and described as a new species in 2017 by Bruce McCune and Marc Curtis. The type specimen was collected by the first author from the North Ridge Trail to Marys Peak ( Benton County, Oregon), at an elevation of 826 m (2,710 ft); it was found growing on shaded andesite rock. Although Cyclohymenia epilithica has been infrequently collected, the authors suggest that it is likely more prevalent than the limited number of collections indicates. To date, this species has been identified exclusively within the Coast Range and the western slope of the Cascade Range in Oregon and Washington. The genus name is derived from the Latin word cyclo, meaning 'circular', referring to the shape of the hymenium—the reproductive tissue layer. This hymenium is cylindrical in form and has a sterile center, distinguishing the genus with this unique structural characteristic.
