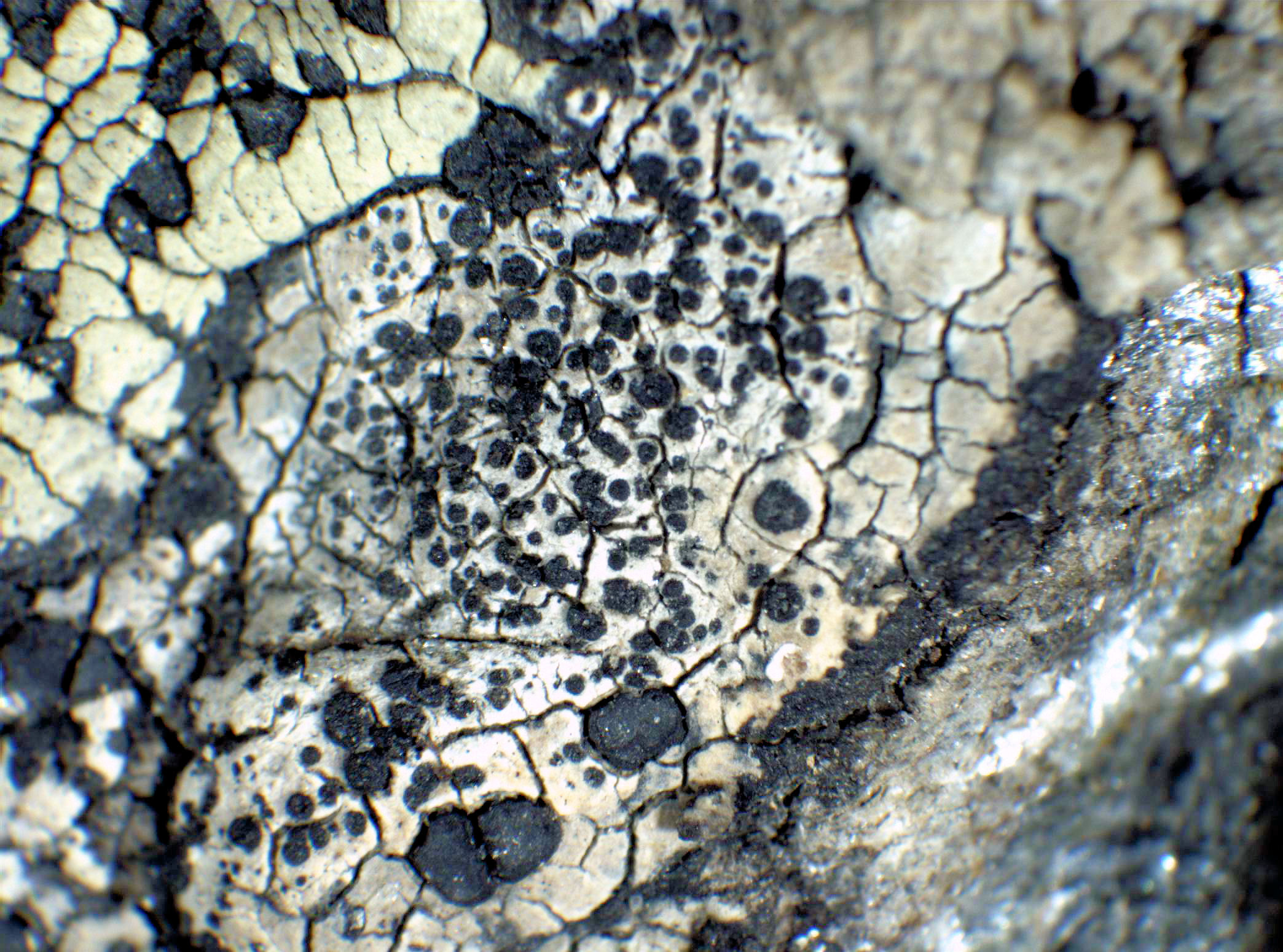
- Cecidonia umbonella

Scientific classification
- Kingdom: Fungi
- Division: Ascomycota
- Class: Lecanoromycetes
- Order: Lecideales
- Family: Lecideaceae
- Genus: Cecidonia; Triebel & Rambold (1988)

Type species
- Cecidonia umbonella (Nyl.) Triebel & Rambold (1988)

Species
- C. umbonella C. xenophana

= Cecidonia =

Genus of fungi

Cecidonia is a genus of lichenicolous (lichen-dwelling) fungi in the family Lecideaceae. It has two species. These fungi create distinctive white, warty swellings or galls up to 6 mm across on the surface of their rock-dwelling lichen hosts, which then develop small black fruiting bodies. The genus name refers to this gall-forming behaviour, and the two species primarily attack crustose lichens that grow on siliceous rocks.

== Taxonomy ==
The genus was circumscribed in 1988 by Dagmar Triebel and Gerhard Rambold, with C. umbonella assigned as the type species.

== Description ==
Cecidonia lives as a parasite on other crust-forming lichens that grow on siliceous rock, most often species of Lecidea or Porpidia. Where it infects its host the surface puffs up into hard, white swellings up to about 6 mm across—hence the genus name, which alludes to gall formation. These warty cushions constitute the visible thallus, but closer inspection shows that most of the tissue is modified host material infiltrated by the parasite's own fungus and its partner, a microscopic green alga of the genus Trebouxia.

Black apothecia appear singly on the galls. They are stalkless, seldom more than 0.6 mm in diameter, and the disc is usually slightly humped in the centre (umbonate). A low rim surrounds the disc and often cracks like the spokes of a wheel as it ages. There is no true thalline margin. In section, the apothecial wall (exciple) is built from chains of inflated cells; the outermost layer is charcoal-black and brittle (carbonaceous), while the inner layers are a paler brown. Above the spore-bearing layer the gel is olive-tinged, and the hymenium itself turns royal blue in iodine—a quick laboratory test. The supporting tissue below (hypothecium) is mid- to dark brown.

The hymenium is threaded by branched, interwoven paraphyses whose top cells are usually pigmented. Asci are long club-shaped, of the Lecidea type, and show a uniform blue reaction in potassium iodide; a shallow, meniscus-shaped ring beneath the apex also picks up the dye. Each ascus produces eight smooth, colourless, single-celled ascospores lacking any gelatinous envelope. Tiny, sunken pycnidia sometimes occur and release rod-shaped conidia. Chemical tests occasionally detect traces of stictic or norstictic acid, but these compounds are thought to originate from the host rather than Cecidonia itself.
