= Bahianora =

Scientific classification
- Domain: Eukaryota
- Kingdom: Fungi
- Division: Ascomycota
- Class: Lecanoromycetes
- Order: Lecideales
- Family: Lecideaceae
- Genus: Bahianora; Kalb (1984)
- Species: B. poeltii

Binomial name
- Bahianora poeltii Kalb (1984)

Single-species lichen genus

Bahianora is a genus of lichenized fungi in the family Lecideaceae. This is a monotypic genus, containing the single species Bahianora poeltii.
