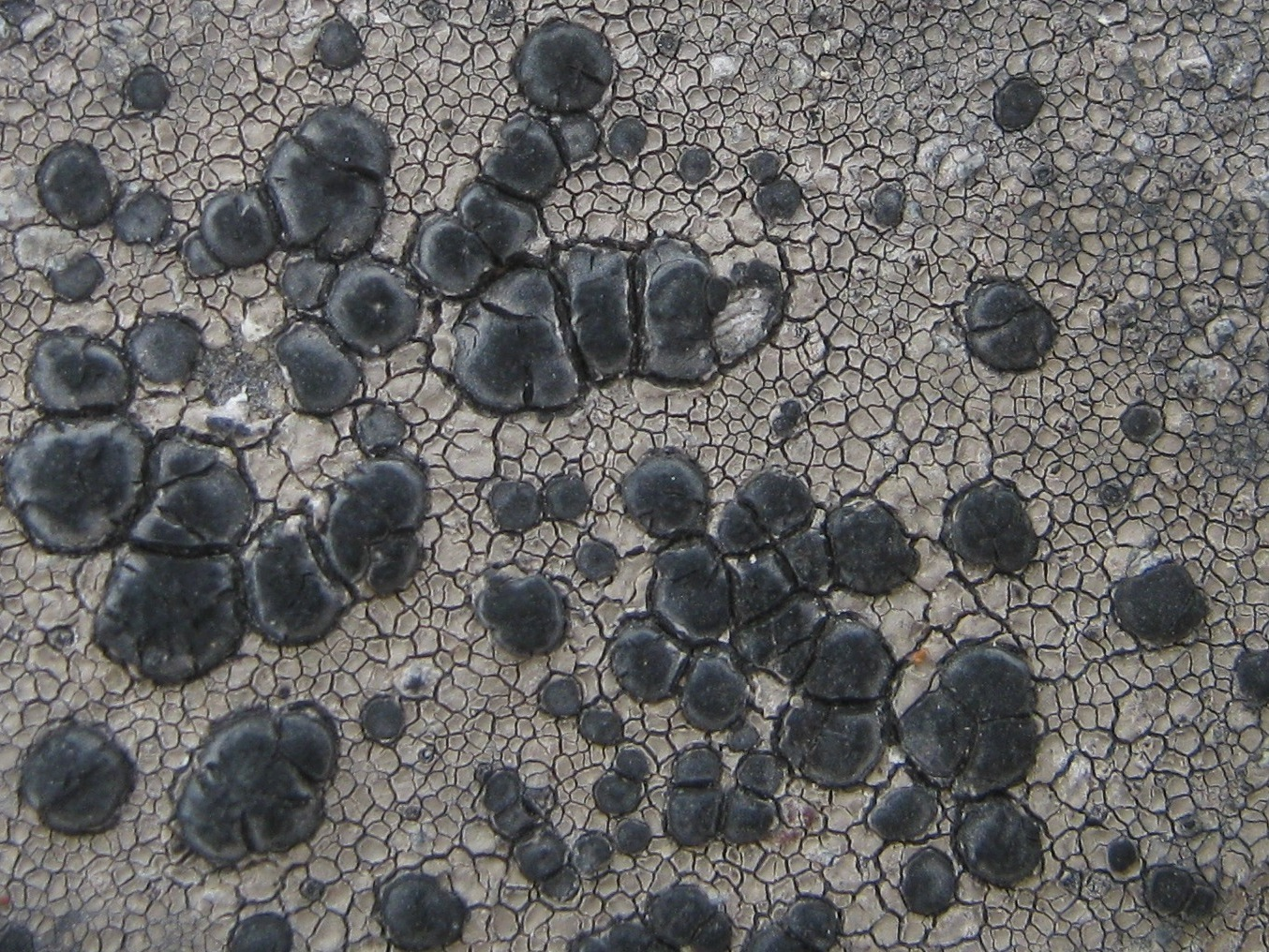
- Lecidea fuscoatra is the type species of the type genus of family Lecideaceae.

Scientific classification
- Kingdom: Fungi
- Division: Ascomycota
- Class: Lecanoromycetes
- Order: Lecideales
- Family: Lecideaceae; Chevall. (1826)

Type genus
- Lecidea Ach. (1803)

Genera
- See text

Synonyms
- Koerberiellaceae Hafellner (1984); Lecidomataceae Hafellner (1984); Mycobilimbiaceae Hafellner (1984); Porpidiaceae Hertel & Hafellner (1984)

= Lecideaceae =

Family of lichen-forming fungi

The Lecideaceae are a family of lichen-forming fungi in the order Lecideales. It contains about 30 genera and roughly 250 species. A major distinguishing characteristic of the family is the lecideine form of the fruiting bodies: typically circular, dark, and without a thalline margin. Most species in the family are lichenised with green algae, although a few species, scattered amongst several genera, are lichenicolous—they live on other lichens. Lecideaceae lichens tend to grow on rocks, wood, and soil. Several Lecideaceae species accelerate the weathering of rock surfaces, a process known as pedogenesis, by extending their hyphae into cracks and expelling rock flakes. This contributes to significantly faster weathering rates in certain environments, impacts various materials from natural rocks to man-made Sekishu roof tiles, and involves key biomolecules identified for survival and biodeterioration, including compounds to withstand intense ultraviolet radiation.

The largest genus in the family, Lecidea, was once a loosely circumscribed wastebasket taxon containing hundreds of morphologically similar species with generally crustose thalli, photobiont-free apothecial margins and translucent, single-celled ascospores. The overall taxonomy and classification within the family has been made more accurate with recent molecular phylogenetics studies. Two Lecideaceae species have been assessed for the global IUCN Red List.

== Systematics ==
=== Historical taxonomy ===
The first member of the present-day Lecideaceae to be formally described was Lichen fusco-ater, later known as Lecidea fuscoatra. The Swedish lichenologist Erik Acharius proposed genus Lecidea in 1803, with Lecidea fuscoatra as the type. This was of several dozen lichen species described by the Swedish taxonomist Carl Linnaeus in his influential 1753 treatise Species Plantarum. The family Lecideaceae was originally proposed by the French botanist François Fulgis Chevallier in his 1826 work Flore générale des environs de Paris; his original spelling of the name was Lecideae. Chevallier's short diagnosis of the family included several characteristics emphasising the form and texture of their reproductive structures and crust. He noted their apothecia (fruiting bodies) to be initially somewhat concave, evolving over time into flat or convex forms that resemble small dishes or patellae, each bordered by a distinct margin. This margin may appear similar to or integrated with a crust, which gradually fades as it ages. Chevallier described the crust itself as membranous, varying from smooth to cracked surfaces, and in some instances, spreading out in a soft, powdery (leprose-farinaceous) manner.

In Josef Hafellner's 1984 work Studien in Richtung einer natürlicheren Gliederung der Sammelfamilien Lecanoraceae und Lecideaceae, he used ascus structure as a major systematic character, dividing these two larger families into numerous, smaller families. However, his proposed families (Koerberiellaceae, Lecidomataceae, Mycobilimbiaceae, and Porpidiaceae) have since been folded into Lecidiaceae; later research showed that ascus structure is not a consistent taxonomic character. For example, Buschbom and Mueller showed in 2004 that Porpidiaceae was not monophyletic unless the Lecideaceae was also included, and that the ascus types used to distinguish between the two families turned out to be modifications of the same basic type. This finding was corroborated in 2006 by Miadłikowska and colleagues, who further showed that the family ought to be reclassified from the order Lecanorales to an uncertain (incertae sedis) provisional placement in the subclass Lecanoromycetidae. Early molecular work suggested that the family was monophyletic.

=== Classification ===
The conventional classification of lichen-producing fungi has faced challenges due to the reliance on readily observable traits for defining taxonomic groups, which often led to the creation of unnatural groupings of species. An example of this is seen with the genus Lecidea, which by the 1930s, had grown to become one of the largest lichen genera, including around 1200 species. This polyphyletic assemblage of similar-looking species was largely as a result of Alexander Zahlbruckner's multi-volume work Catalogus lichenum universalis, which tended to fit any species with crustose thallus, biatorine or lecideine apothecia and simple ascospores into this wastebasket taxon. However, several studies using morphological and chemical characters demonstrated that Lecidea, in the sense of Zahlbruckner, was polyphyletic. Nearing the end of the twentieth century, researchers had a better idea of the limits of the genus and many taxa were moved to different new and preexisting genera. By 2011, more than 160 genera from various families included species previously classified within Lecidea. In the most recent (2008) edition of the Dictionary of the Fungi, Lecidea was estimated to contain 427 species, although it was acknowledged that only about 100 of these qualified as Lecidea in the strict sense (sensu stricto). In this cases, sensu stricto in the sense of Hertel means saxicolous lichens with certain anatomical characters, such as excipulum, paraphyses and apical ascus structures.

The order Lecideales was proposed by Edvard August Vainio in 1934, in the fourth volume of his work Lichenographica Fennica. The order was generally neglected in later classifications as the family was historically classified in the order Lecanorales. The order was resurrected in 2011 by Schmull and colleagues, who redefined the type genus to include only Lecidea sensu stricto. They used molecular phylogenetics to show that this group of species, defined by morphology and including the type species (Lecidea fuscoatra) and a few Porpidia, species, formed a monophyletic clade. Molecular phylogenetics analysis shows the order Lecideales as a sister group to the Peltigerales.

=== Etymology ===
As is standard practice in botanical nomenclature, the name Lecideaceae is based on the name of the type genus, Lecidea, with the ending -aceae indicating the rank of family. The genus name comprises the Greek word λέκος (lékos), meaning "plate" or "small shield", and the suffix "-ídes", indicating similarity. This alludes to the lecideine apothecia, which are usually somewhat circular and lack a thalline margin.

== Description ==
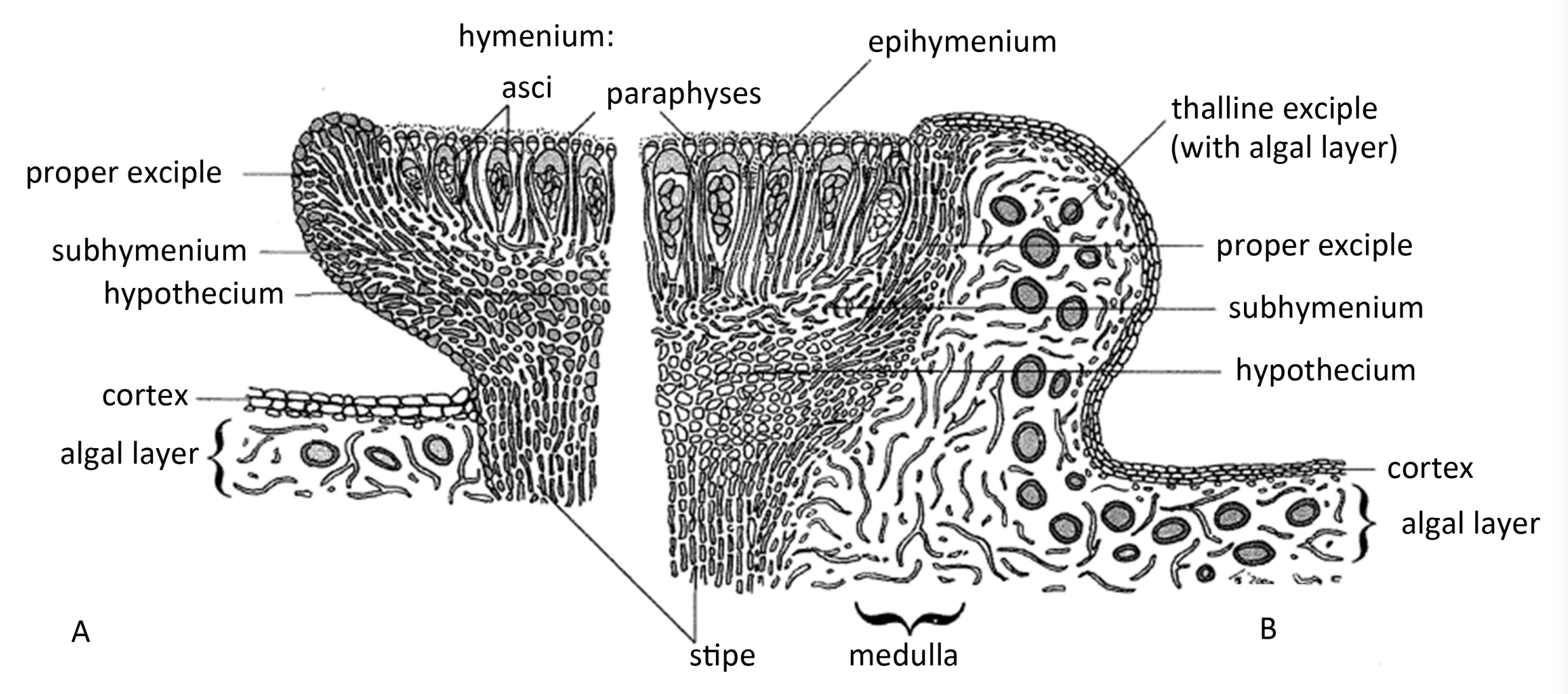
Diagrammatic representation and comparison of cross sections of lecideine (left) and lecanorine (right) apothecia

Family Lecideaceae comprises lichens with a range of growth forms from crust-like (crustose) to scale-like (squamulose). In rare instances, the thallus may be absent. These organisms establish a symbiotic relationship primarily with green algae (chlorococcoid photobionts), and in some instances (such as in the genus Amygdalaria), they also engage with cyanobacteria within specialised structures called cephalodia. The reproductive structures (ascomata) of these lichens are typically apothecia, which can either sit prominently on the surface (sessile) or be partially embedded (immersed) within the thallus. These apothecia may resemble those found in the genera Lecidea and Aspicilia (lecideine or aspicilioid). Most genera in Lecideaceae have lecideine apothecia; exceptions are Bellemerea, Koerberiella, and Lecaimmeria, which have lecanorine apothecia. The structure and position of the ascocarp in Cyclohymenia epilithica appear to be unique among Lecideaceae: this lichen has a central sterile column surrounded by a ring-shaped hymenium.

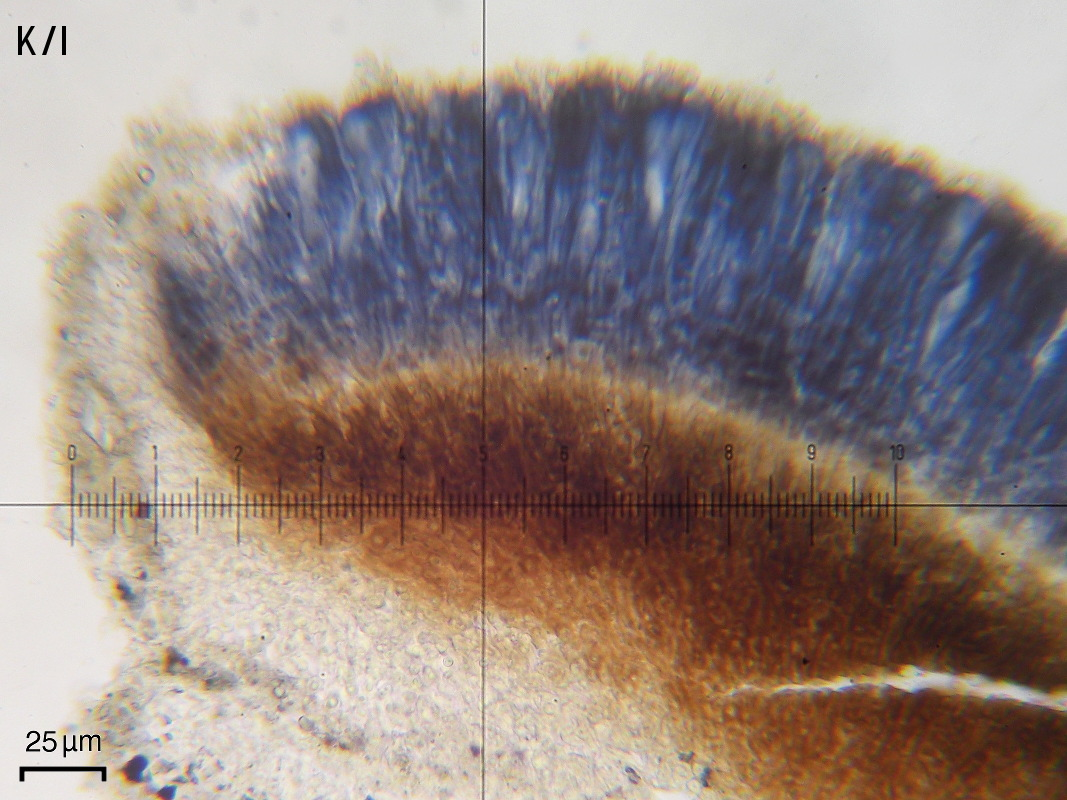
Microscopy of cross section of K/I-stained Lecidea uniformis apothecium, showing a proper exciple (translucent), hymenium with asci and paraphyses (blue), hypothecium (red-brown), and a thin, light-coloured band of subhymenium between them

The internal framework (hamathecium) of these reproductive structures is made up of paraphyses, which are sparingly branched and interconnected (anastomosing). These structures are amyloid, and stain blue with iodine. Paraphyses are usually swollen at the tips, and often pigmented. The asci, or spore-bearing cells, are partially split (semifissitunicate) and feature an amyloid structure at the tip (apical tholus) and amyloid walls, housing a pale central area and a darker top or ring-like structure. These asci are club-shaped (clavate) to cylindrical.

Lecideaceae lichens typically produce eight spores per ascus. These ascospores are non-septate, cylindrical to ellipsoid in shape, hyaline, and non-amyoid. The conidiomata of Lecideaceae are in the form of pycnidia; these structures tend to be dark-walled and immersed in the thallus. The conidia are non-septate and can be cylindrical, rod-shaped (bacilliform), or thread-like (filiform).

Identifying species within the largest Lecideaceae genus, Lecidea, is challenging due to similarities in morphology, anatomical structures, and chemical compositions with many other genera, especially Lecidella in the family Lecanoraceae, and Porpidia in the Lecideaceae. The main distinctions between Lecidea and Lecidella include Lecidella's typically grey, granular thallus with black, blue-black, or white-grey lower thallus; reproductive structures such as soredia, isidia, and blastidia; common presence of conidiomata; Lecanora-type asci; paraphyses that are not fused and easily dispersed; and secondary metabolites including xanthones, orcinol depsidones, β-orcinol depsides, and triterpenoids. Lecidea and Porpidia, both belonging to the Lecideaceae, differ in that Porpidia has soredia, isidia, and blastidia; conidiomata; Porpidia-type asci apex; spores with a halo; fused and branched paraphyses; and secondary metabolites like confluentic acid, norstictic acid, hypostictic acid, 2'-O-methylmicrophyllinnic acid, and 2'-O-methylperlatolic acid. Due to the subtle morphological differences among these genera, distinguishing them based solely on morphology and chemical components is difficult.

== Photobionts ==
In a 1971 study, Margalith Galun and colleagues examined the mycobiont–photobiont relationship in three Lecidea species (Lecidea olivacea, Lecidea opaca, and Lecidea decipiens) by using electron microscopy. The photobionts for the first two are Trebouxia, while it is Myrmecia for the third. They found that the contact between the symbionts ranged from intracellular fungal invasion in the primitively organised thallus to a looser association of wall-to-wall attachment in the more highly differentiated growth forms. Trebouxia arboricola has been identified as a common photobiont in the Lediceaceae.

== Chemistry ==
Secondary metabolites (lichen products) found in Lecideaceae lichens include depsides and depsidones. The main genus Lecidea produces several secondary metabolites: confluentic acid, norstictic acid, hypostictic acid, gyrophoric acid, planaic acid, 2'-O-methylanziaic, 2'-O-methylmicrophyllinnic acid, 2'-O-methylperlatolic acid, and 4'-O-demethylplanaic acid.

In the lichen Lecidea lactea, the depsidone norstictic acid is involved in immobilising copper (Cu), forming a Cu^{2+}–norstictic acid complex. Similarly, psoromic acid, which shares a chemical similarity with norstictic acid, is suggested to sequester Cu^{2+} through chelation in Lecidea bullata. These species belong to the Lecideion inops alliance, a community of lichen species that are adapted to survive on copper-rich substrates and may show a distinct green colouration in parts of the thallus or apothecia due to copper deposits. A subsequent investigation identified crystals of moolooite, a copper oxalate compound, within Lecidea inops found growing on chalcopyrite ore. This finding confirms the lichen's ability to biomineralise this compound under suitable environmental conditions.

== Genera ==
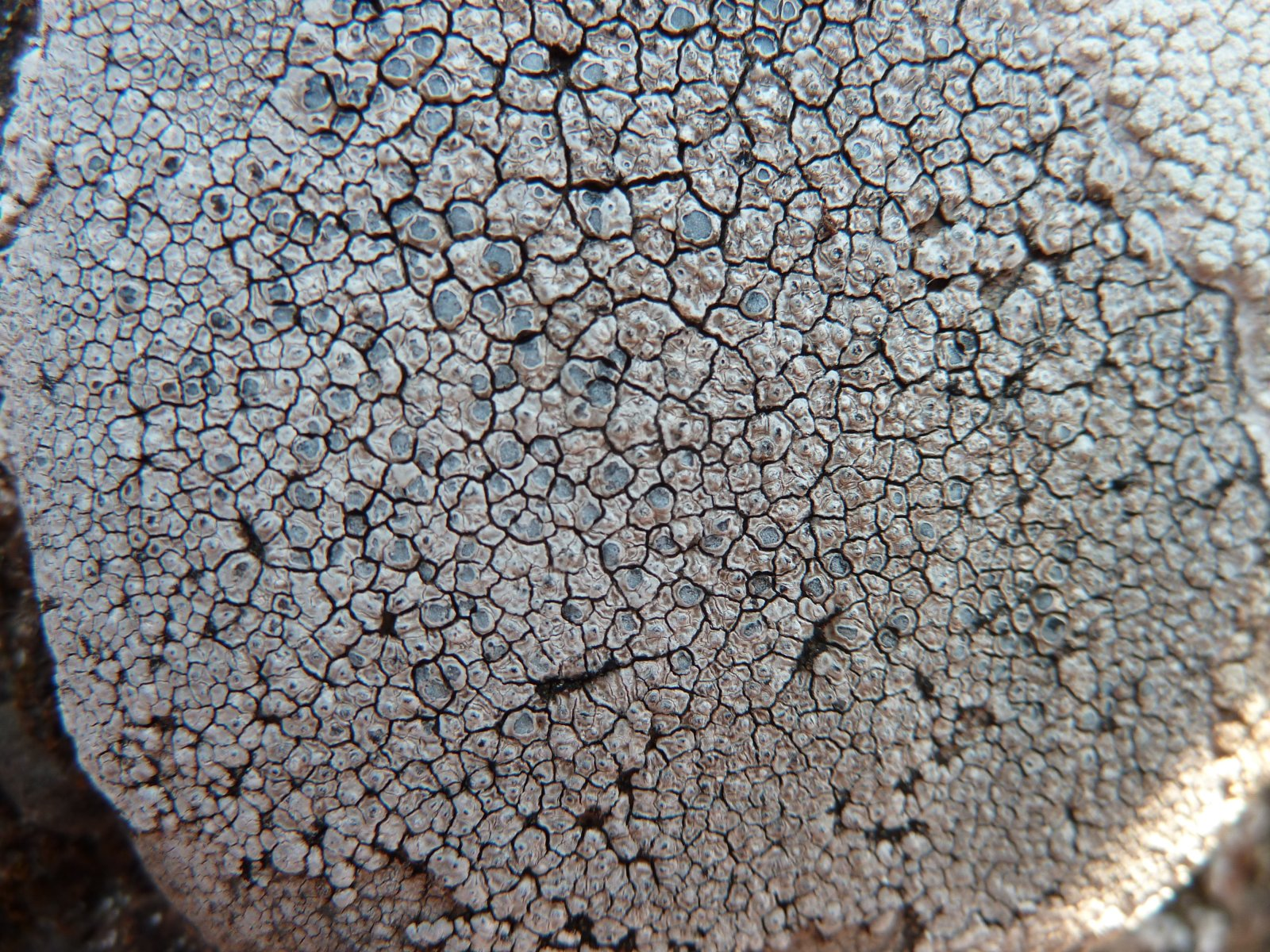
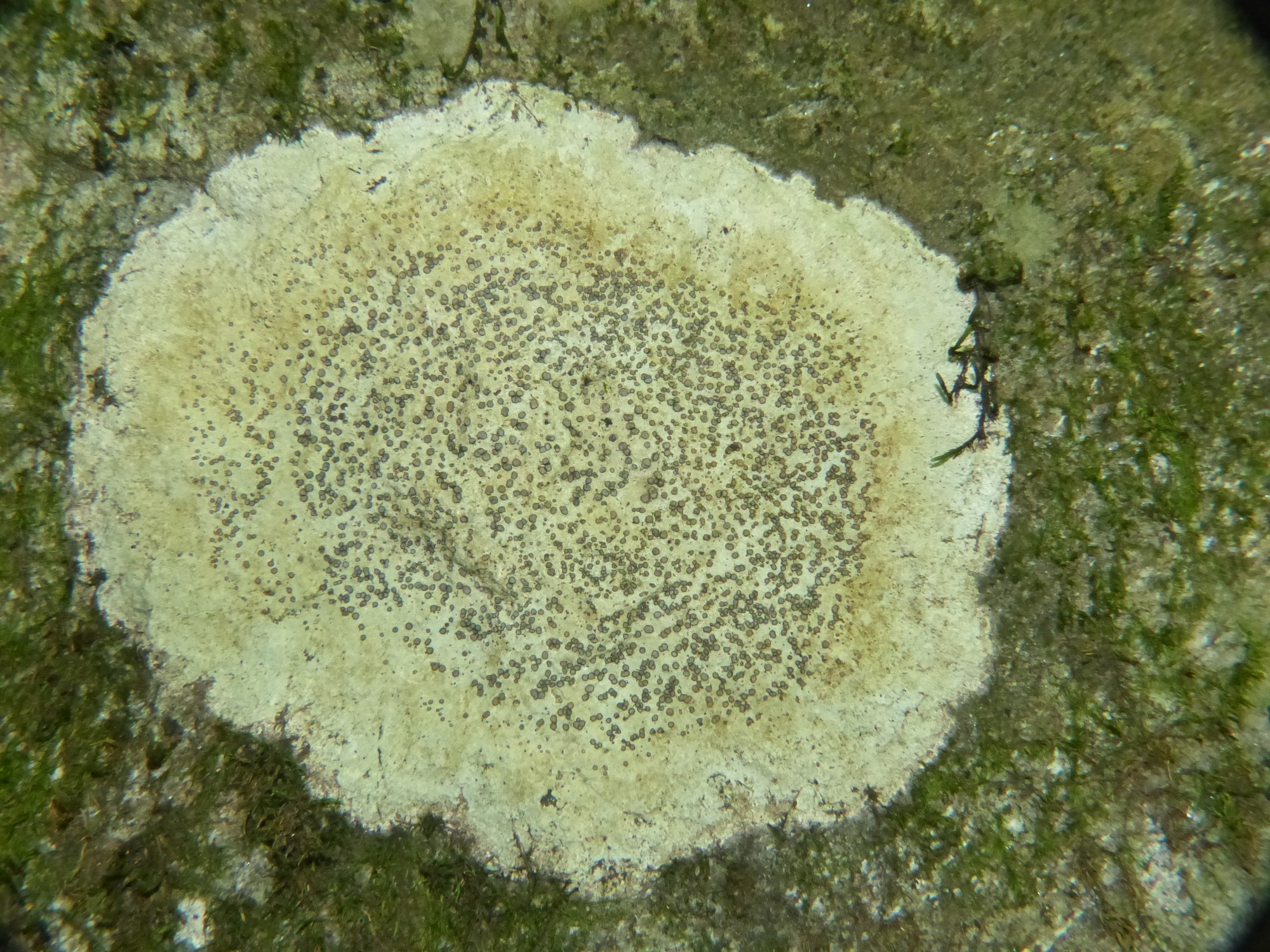
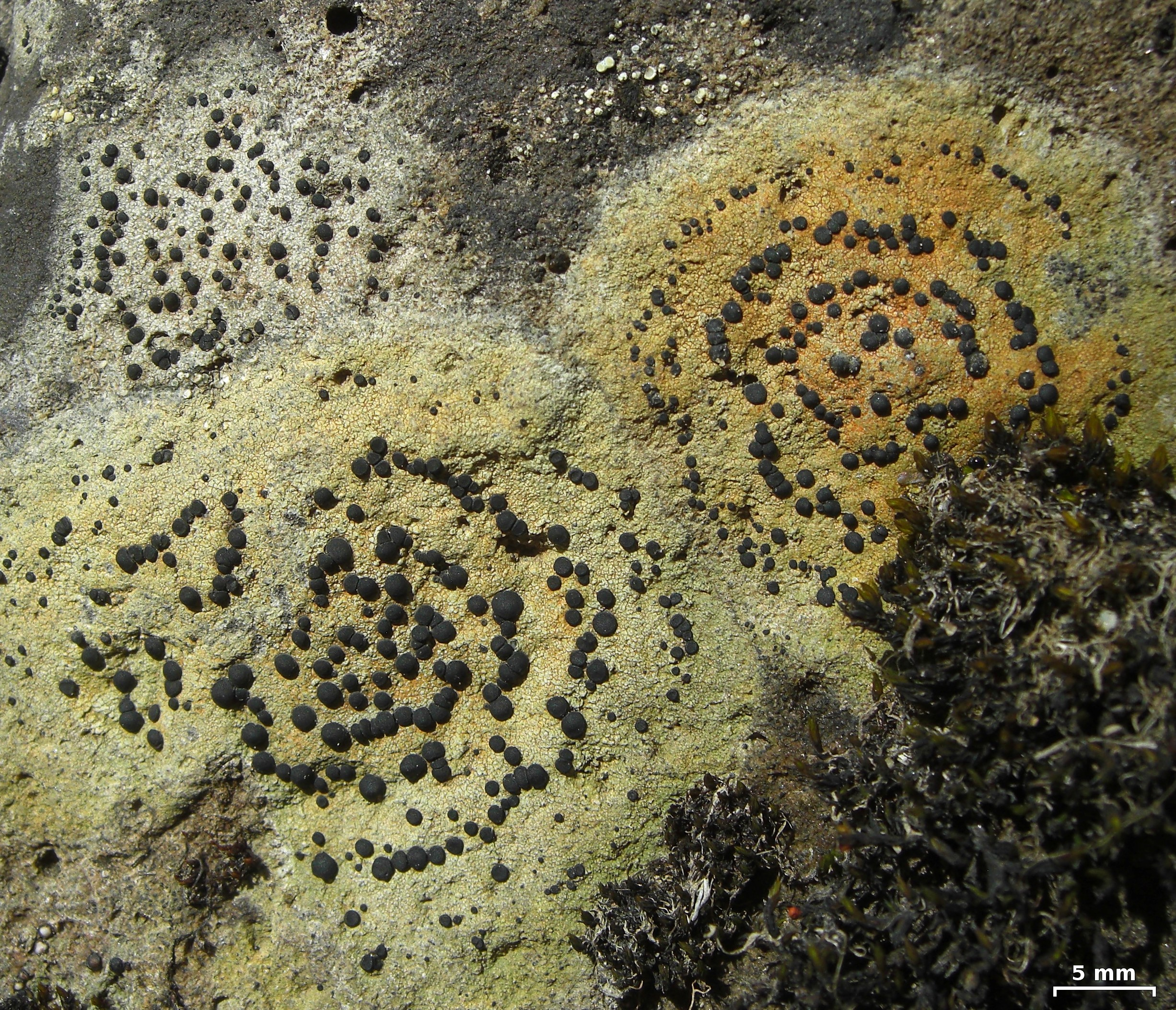
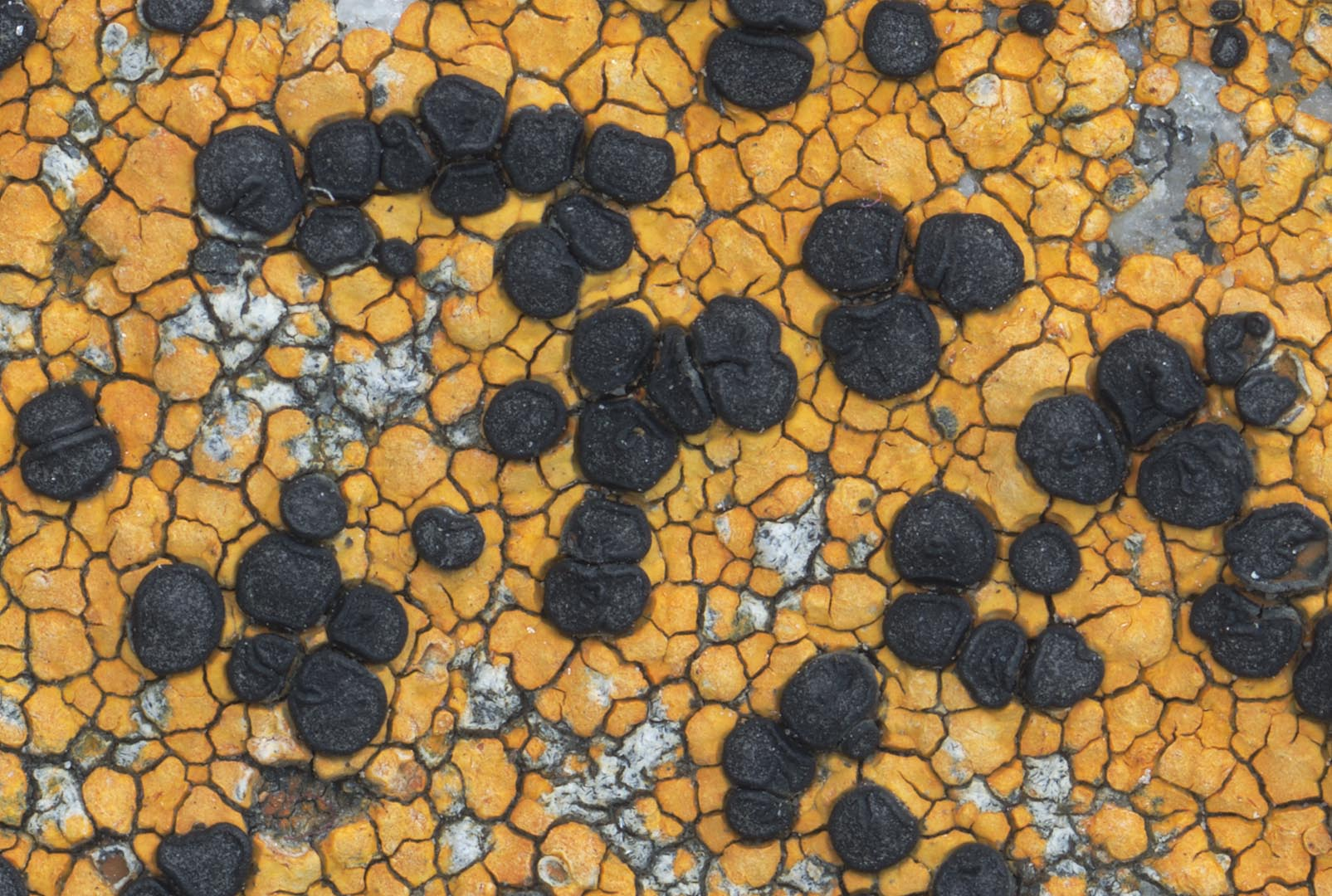
Example Lecideaceae members: (clockwise from upper left): Immersaria athroocarpa; Porpidia albocaerulescens; P. flavocaerulescens, and P. crustulata.
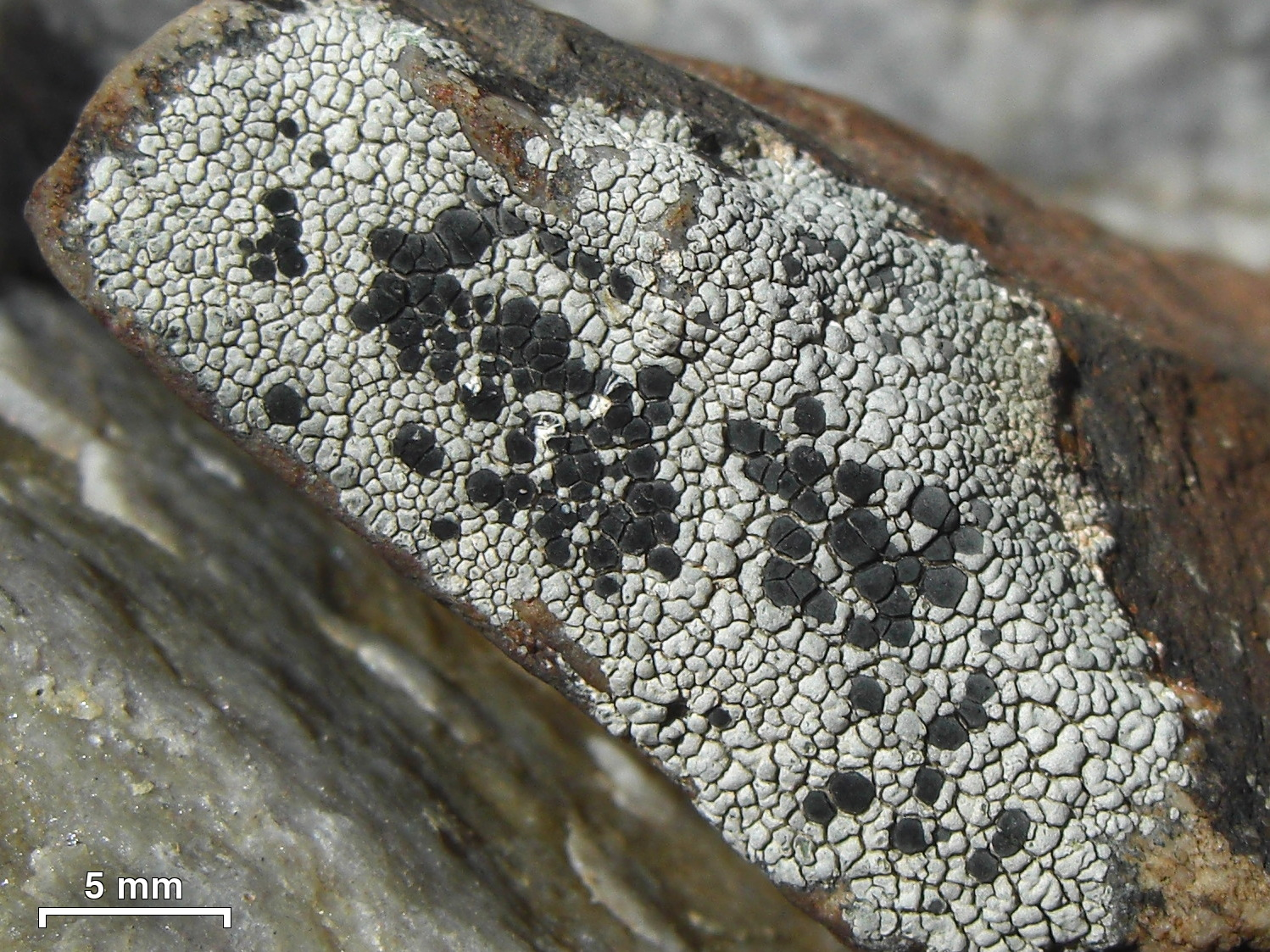
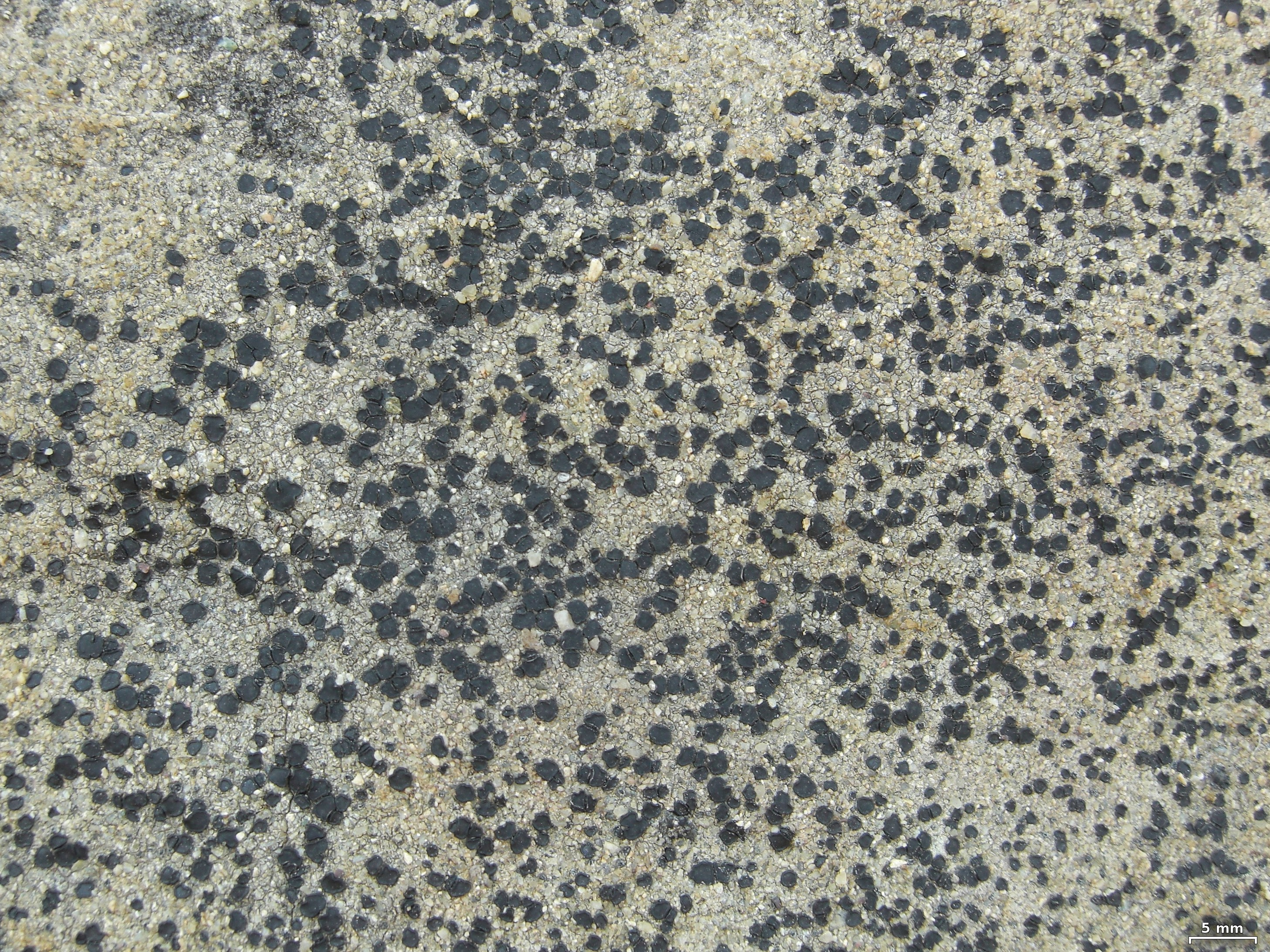
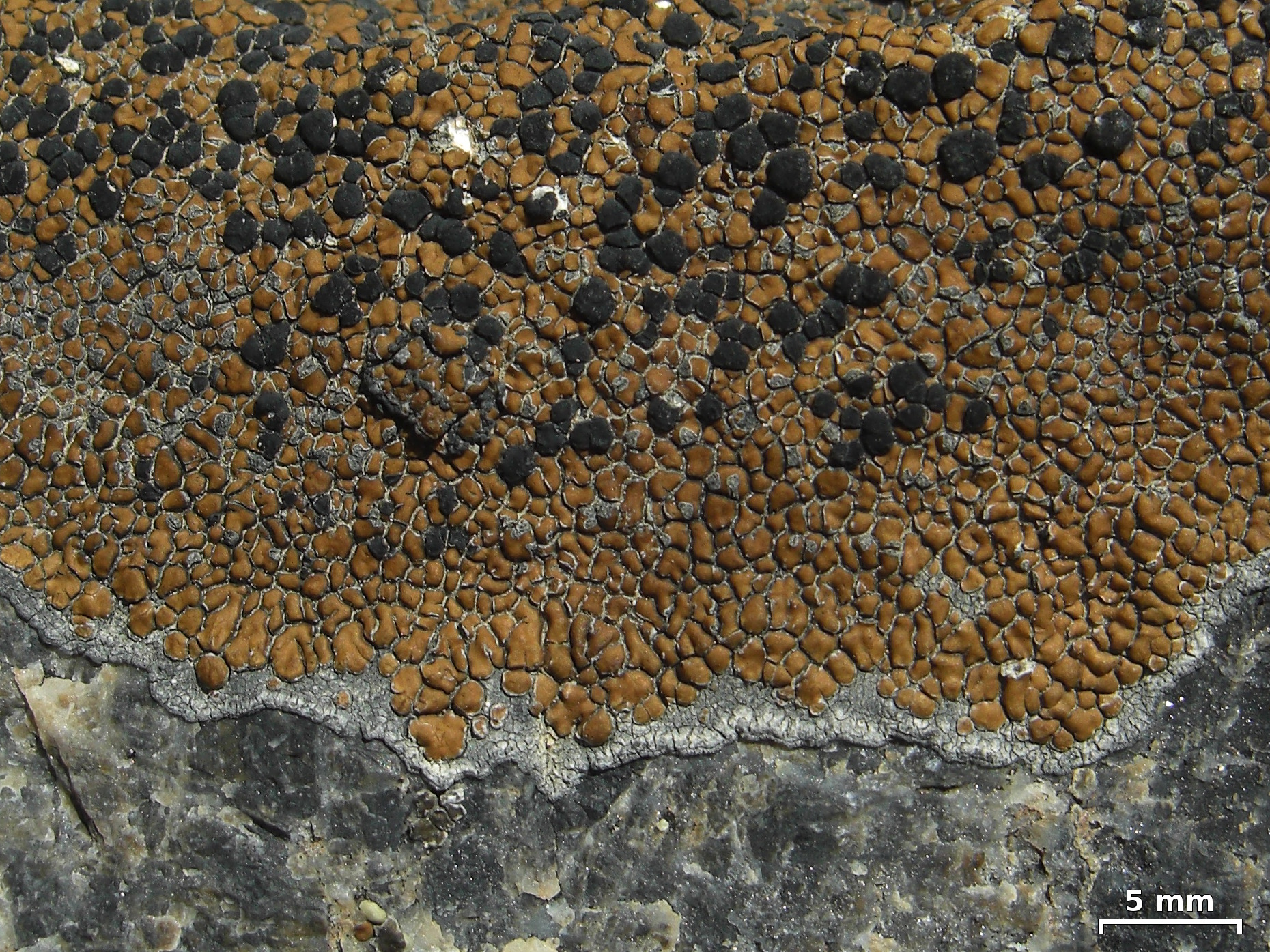
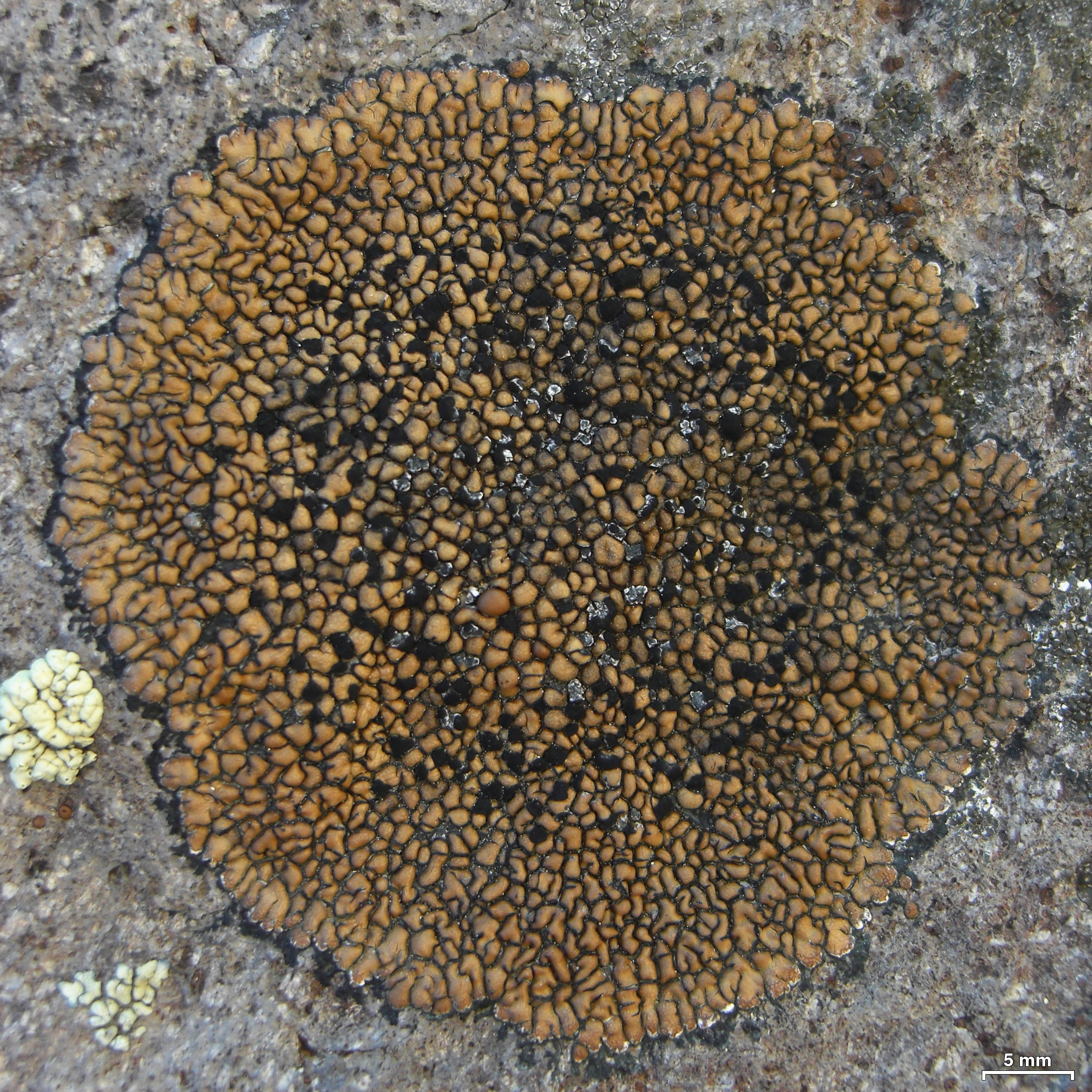
Much of the biodiversity of the Lecideaceae is taken up by genus Lecidea; examples include (clockwise from upper left): L. tessellata; L. laboriosa; L. perlatolica, and L. protabacina.

In the seventh edition (2001) of the Dictionary of the Fungi, Lecideaceae was estimated to contain 9 genera and 441 species; by the next edition (2008), these numbers had changed to 7 genera and 436 species. In this latter work, the largest genus Lecidea was estimated to contain about 427 species, although it was acknowledged that only about 100 of these qualified as Lecidea sensu stricto. According to a 2022 estimate, the Lecideaceae comprise 29 genera and about 260 species. As of February 2024, Species Fungorum (in the Catalogue of Life) accept 29 genera and 244 species in Lecideaceae. Many of these genera are monospecific or small genera, with fewer than five species. The following list indicates the genus name, the taxonomic authority, year of publication, and the number of species:

- Amygdalaria Norman (1852) – 11 spp.
- Bahianora Kalb (1984) – 1 sp.
- Bellemerea Hafellner & Cl.Roux (1984) – 10 spp.
- Bryobilimbia Fryday, Printzen & S.Ekman (2014) – 6 spp.
- Catarrhospora Brusse (1994) – 2 spp.
- Cecidonia Triebel & Rambold (1988) – 2 spp.
- Clauzadea Hafellner & Bellem. (1984) – 7 spp.
- Cyclohymenia McCune & M.J.Curtis (2017) – 1 sp.
- Eremastrella S.Vogel (1955) – 2 spp.
- Farnoldia Hertel (1983) – 6 spp.
- Immersaria Rambold & Pietschm. (1989) – 8 spp.
- Imsharria Fryday & U.Rupr. (2024)
- Koerberiella Stein (1879) – 2 spp.
- Lecaimmeria C.M.Xie, Lu L.Zhang & Li S.Wang (2022) – 11 spp.
- Lecidea Ach. (1803) – ca. 100 spp.
- Lecidoma Gotth.Schneid. & Hertel (1981) – 1 sp.
- Lopacidia Kalb (1984) – 1 sp.
- Melanolecia Hertel (1981) – 7 spp.
- Pachyphysis R.C.Harris & Ladd (2007) – 1 sp.
- Paraporpidia Rambold & Pietschm. (1989) – 3 spp.
- Poeltiaria Hertel (1984) – 8 spp.
- Poeltidea Hertel & Hafellner (1984) – 3 spp.
- Porpidia Körb. (1855) – 51 spp.
- Porpidinia Timdal (2010) – 2 spp.
- Pseudopannaria (B.de Lesd.) Zahlbr. (1924) – 1 sp.
- Rhizolecia Hertel (1984) – 1 sp.
- Romjularia Timdal (2007) – 1 sp.
- Schizodiscus Brusse (1988) – 1 sp.
- Stenhammarella Hertel (1967) – 1 sp.
- Stephanocyclos Hertel (1983) – 1 sp.
- Xenolecia Hertel (1984) – 2 spp.

In 2014, Alan Fryday and Hannes Hertel proposed to reduce the genera Labyrintha and Notolecidea to synonymy with Poeltidea and Poeltiaria respectively.

Several genera once historically classified in the Lecideaceae have since been moved to other families in light of molecular phylogenetic studies. Examples include Bacidia, which was shown to belong in the Ramalinaceae, a family in the Lecanorales. Heppsora was initially proposed for inclusion in the Lecideaceae based on its resemblance to Heppia and Psora, but is now also in the Ramalinaceae. Mycobilimbia is another example of a genus that was until recently placed in Lecideaceae but is now in the Ramalinaceae. In 2013, genus Hypocenomyce, a resident of the Lecideaceae for several decades, was shown to be extremely polyphyletic and split into four genera distributed amongst three families, none of which were Ledideaceae. Roccellinastrum was included in the family following a 1983 emendation of the genus, but is now in the Ectolechiaceae (previously the Pilocapraceae).

In 2025, Fryday and colleagues proposed two new Tasmanian porpidioid genera in Lecideaceae, Aurantiothallia and Hertelaria, supported by morphology and multi-locus phylogenetics (ITS, mtSSU and RPB1).

== Habitat, distribution, and ecology ==
Lecideaceae lichens usually grow on bark, on soil, and on rocks. Collectively, the family has a cosmopolitan distribution. The family is one of the most common in Antarctic cryptoendolithic communities. Contrary to the typical habitats favoured by other North American species in the Lecideaceae, Cyclohymenia epilithica uniquely thrives in shaded environments in cool, moist, temperate climates. The family has been less well-studied in the Southern Hemisphere in comparison to the Northern Hemisphere.

There are 17 species of lichenicolous (lichen-dwelling) fungi and lichens in the Lecideaceae. These species are distributed amongst the genera Bellemerea, Cecidonia, Immersaria, Lecidea, and Poeltiaria. In some of these cases of lichenicolous lichens, such as Bellemerea cupreoatra and Poeltiaria coromandelica, the juvenile lichen is facultatively lichenicolous but becomes independent as an adult.

=== Pedogenesis ===
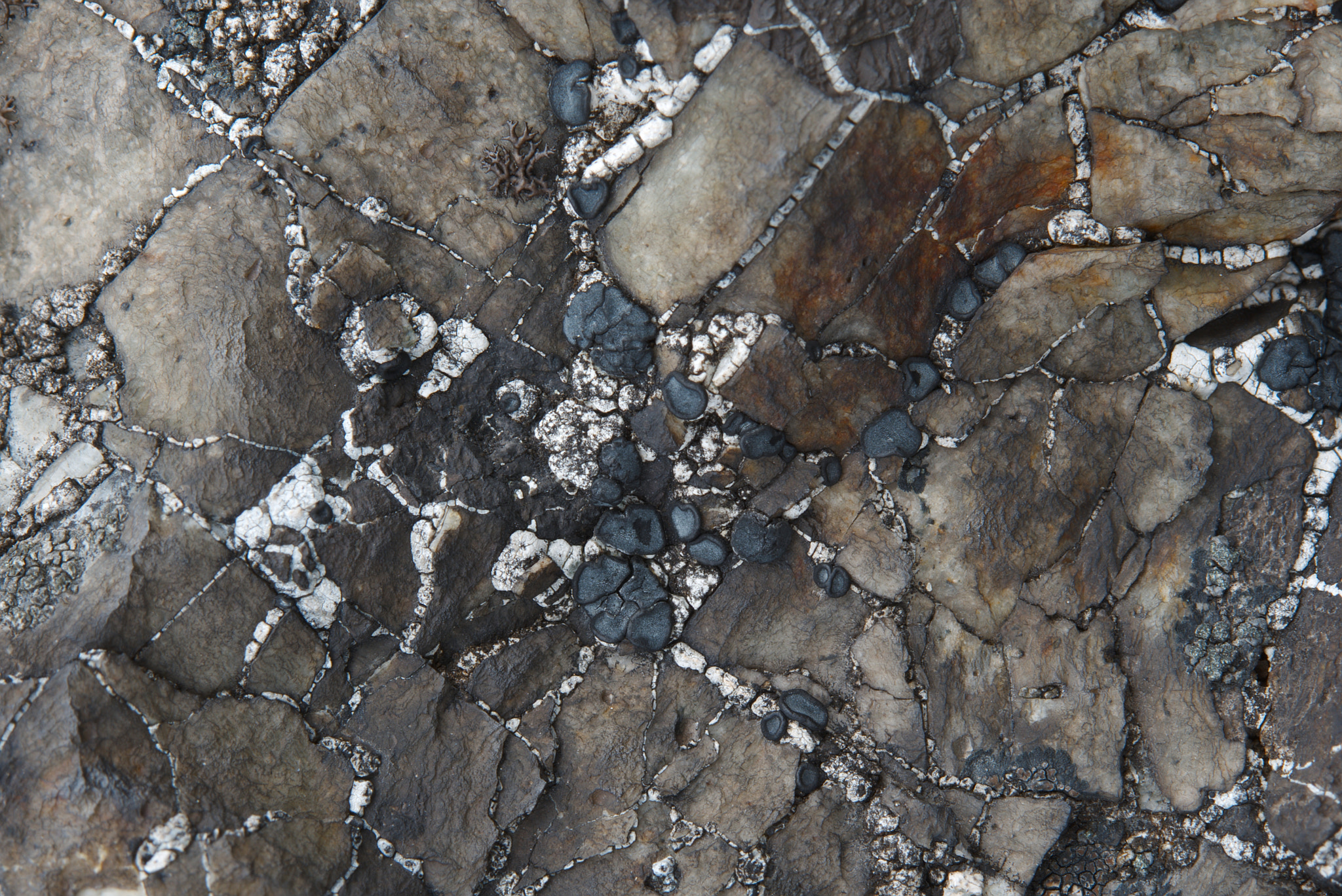
The dark-colored apothecia of Lecidea auriculata emerge from cracks in the rock. The presence of this lichen hastens rock breakdown (pedogenesis).

Several Lecidea species contribute to the weathering processes on rock surfaces, known as pedogenesis. These saxicolous species extend their hyphae into rock crevices, gradually detaching, incorporating, and expelling rock flakes. Lecidea auriculata, an example of a euendolithic lichen, actively bores into and inhabits the mineral matrix within rocks. In specific arctic alpine environments, surfaces colonized by these lichens weather at rates estimated to be 25–50 times faster than those caused by other natural processes. The weathering impact of Lecidea auriculata on the Little Ice Age moraines of the glacier Storbreen in Jotunheimen, central southern Norway, has been documented. The degradative activity of the species is confined by its ecological range, which is predominantly limited to areas with minimal snow cover. Species of Lecidea have also been observed degrading a variety of substances including granite, Magaliesberg quartzite, serpentinized ultramafic rocks, and volcanic andesite. Research on Lecidea tesselata, found on desert rocks in western North America, identified key biomolecules aiding survival and chemical biodeterioration using Raman spectroscopy. It accumulates calcium oxalate monohydrate, the UV protectant scytonemin, and haematite to withstand high UV radiation levels. In addition to natural materials, Lecidea species affect man-made objects. Sekishu roof tiles are a traditional Japanese housing component that are covered with an opaque reddish brown glaze consisting of an alkali feldspar-type X-ray amorphous glass, a surface that is unlikely to be affected by normal chemical weathering. The tiles tend to get colonised by Lecidea, which, after about 7–10 years, results in the appearance of corrosion pits up to 50 μm deep. Although research on pedogensis often focuses on Lecidea within the family Lecideaceae, similar weathering effects have been documented in the genus Porpidia.

== Conservation ==
Two Lecideaceae species have been assessed for the global IUCN Red List: Lecidea mayeri (data deficient, 2023), and Immersaria fuliginosa (vulnerable, 2020). Lecidea mayeri is classified as data deficient due to the lack of information on its population, habitat, ecology, and potential threats. It is known only from the municipality of Angelópolis in the Antioquia Department in Colombia. More is known about Immersaria fuliginosa, found in two location on the Falkland Islands. It faces several threats that could rapidly lead to its decline and potential extinction, primarily due to its very limited distribution across just two locations with a total area of occupancy of 8 km^{2} (3.1 sq mi). The main threats include trampling by livestock, fires (both natural and anthropogenic), and the adverse effects of climatic changes, such as decreased summer rainfall and increased sunlight, which could negatively impact its survival. Conservation efforts are needed, including land protection and local education, to mitigate these threats and safeguard the species.
