= Poeltiaria =

Scientific classification
- Kingdom: Fungi
- Division: Ascomycota
- Class: Lecanoromycetes
- Order: Lecideales
- Family: Lecideaceae
- Genus: Poeltiaria; Hertel (1984)

Type species
- Poeltiaria turgescens (Körb.) Hertel (1984)

Species
- P. coppinsiana P. coromandelica P. corralensis P. tasmanica P. turgescens P. urbanskyana

Synonyms
- Notolecidea Hertel (1984) (suggested synonym)

Genus of lichen-forming fungi

Poeltiaria is a genus of lichen-forming fungi in the family Lecideaceae.

== Taxonomy ==
The genus was circumscribed in 1984 by the lichenologist Hannes Hertel, with Poeltiaria turgescens assigned as the type species. The genus name Poeltiaria honours the German-Austrian lichenologist Josef Poelt (1924–1995).

Hertel originally introduced Notolecidea in 1984 for the single species Notolecidea subcontinua, treating it as a separate genus close to the Porpidiaceae. In their later revision of southern subpolar Lecideaceae, Alan Fryday and Hertel re-examined N. subcontinua and showed that the characters used to separate Notolecidea from Poeltiaria—the reported presence of atranorin in the thallus and algal cells in the basal exciple—are inconsistent and taxonomically unreliable, with thin-layer chromatography revealing either only triterpenes or no detectable substances and algal cells in the exciple not consistently present. Because its anatomy and overall morphology match species already placed in Poeltiaria, they treated Notolecidea as a synonym of Poeltiaria and transferred the type species as Poeltiaria subcontinua. Nevertheless, the genus Notolecidea is still accepted by both the Catalogue of Life and by the Global Biodiversity Information Facility.

== Species ==
As of July 2026, the genus contains six accepted species according to the Catalogue of Life.

- Poeltiaria coppinsiana Hertel (2014)
- Poeltiaria coromandelica (Zahlbr.) Rambold & Hertel (1989)
- Poeltiaria corralensis (Räsänen) Hertel (1984)
- Poeltiaria tasmanica Fryday (2014)
- Poeltiaria turgescens (Körb.) Hertel (1984)
- Poeltiaria urbanskyana (Zahlbr.) Hertel (1984)

The following species are not currently accepted in the Catalogue of Life.

- Poeltiaria howickensis (Vain.) Rambold & Haiduk (1989).
- Poeltiaria subcontinua (Nyl.) Hertel & Fryday (2014) is now considered a synonym of Notolecidea subcontinua (Nyl.) Hertel (1984).
