= Pseudopannaria =

Scientific classification
- Domain: Eukaryota
- Kingdom: Fungi
- Division: Ascomycota
- Class: Lecanoromycetes
- Order: Lecideales
- Family: Lecideaceae
- Genus: Pseudopannaria (de Lesd.) Zahlbr.

Type species
- Pseudopannaria marcii (B. de Lesd.) Zahlbr.

Genus of fungi

Pseudopannaria is a genus of lichenized fungi within the Lecideaceae family. This is a monotypic genus, containing the single species Pseudopannaria marcii.
