= Catarrhospora =

Scientific classification
- Domain: Eukaryota
- Kingdom: Fungi
- Division: Ascomycota
- Class: Lecanoromycetes
- Order: Lecideales
- Family: Lecideaceae
- Genus: Catarrhospora; Brusse (1994)

Type species
- Catarrhospora mira Brusse (1994)

Species
- C. mira C. splendida

Genus of fungi

Catarrhospora is a genus of two species of lichens in the family Lecideaceae that are found in South Africa. The genus was circumscribed by the lichenologist Franklin Andrej Brusse in 1994.
