= Rhizolecia =

Scientific classification
- Domain: Eukaryota
- Kingdom: Fungi
- Division: Ascomycota
- Class: Lecanoromycetes
- Order: Lecideales
- Family: Lecideaceae
- Genus: Rhizolecia; Hertel

Type species
- Rhizolecia hybrida (Zahlbr.) Hertel

Genus of fungi

Rhizolecia is a genus of lichenized fungi within the Lecideaceae family. This is a monotypic genus, containing the single species Rhizolecia hybrida.
