= Farnoldia =

Scientific classification
- Domain: Eukaryota
- Kingdom: Fungi
- Division: Ascomycota
- Class: Lecanoromycetes
- Order: Lecideales
- Family: Lecideaceae
- Genus: Farnoldia; Hertel (1983)

Type species
- Farnoldia jurana (Schaer.) Hertel (1983)

Species
- F. hypocrita F. jurana F. muscigena

Genus of lichen-forming fungi

Farnoldia is a small genus of lichen-forming fungi in the family Lecideaceae. These lichens grow as dark crusts on limestone and other calcium-rich rocks, especially in mountainous areas. The genus contains three known species and can be distinguished from similar lichens by their distinctive black fruiting bodies (apothecia) and violet reaction when tested with iodine staining.

== Taxonomy ==
The genus was circumscribed by the German lichenologist Hannes Hertel in 1983; he assigned F. jurana as the type species. The genus name honours the German lichenologist Ferdinand Christian Gustav Arnold.

== Description ==
Farnoldia species form dark, crust-like patches on lime-rich rock, particularly in upland settings. The fungal layers may sit entirely within the first millimetre of the stone or spread as a thin, continuous film on the surface that can crack with age. There is no distinct prothallus border, and chemical testing with iodine usually turns the inner white layer (medulla) a violet shade—though in some specimens the reaction is faint. The photosynthetic partner is a spherical green alga of the genus Trebouxia.

The reproductive structures of Farnoldia lichens are small, black apothecia that rest directly on the thallus and are often slightly pinched at the base. Each disc is flat to gently domed and surrounded by a raised, jet-black wall (the true exciple) made of densely packed hyphae; in a thin microscope section this wall lifts cleanly away from the darker supporting tissue beneath, providing a quick field mark that separates Farnoldia from the otherwise similar genus Porpidia. Under the microscope the spore-bearing layer (hymenium) is colourless to pale green and stains bright blue in iodine, while the layer below (hypothecium) is deep green-brown to nearly black. Slender paraphyses branch and link to form a loose web, but their tips show little swelling. Each ascus is of the Porpidia type, with a thickened, blue-staining cap (tholus) pierced by a more intensely amyloid tube, and holds eight smooth, colourless, single-celled ascospores that are ellipsoid and wrapped in a conspicuous gelatinous coat.

Minute, black pycnidia may dot the thallus or even the bare rock nearby; they produce short, rod-shaped conidia for asexual dispersal. Standard chromatographic tests have so far failed to detect any characteristic lichen products in the genus, so identification relies on the iodine-positive medulla, the black, separable exciple and the upland, calcareous habitat.

== Species ==
Three species of Farnoldia are accepted:

- Farnoldia hypocrita (A.Massal.) Hertel (1992)
- Farnoldia jurana (Schaer.) Hertel (1983)
- Farnoldia muscigena (Vězda) Tretiach & Hafellner (2000)
