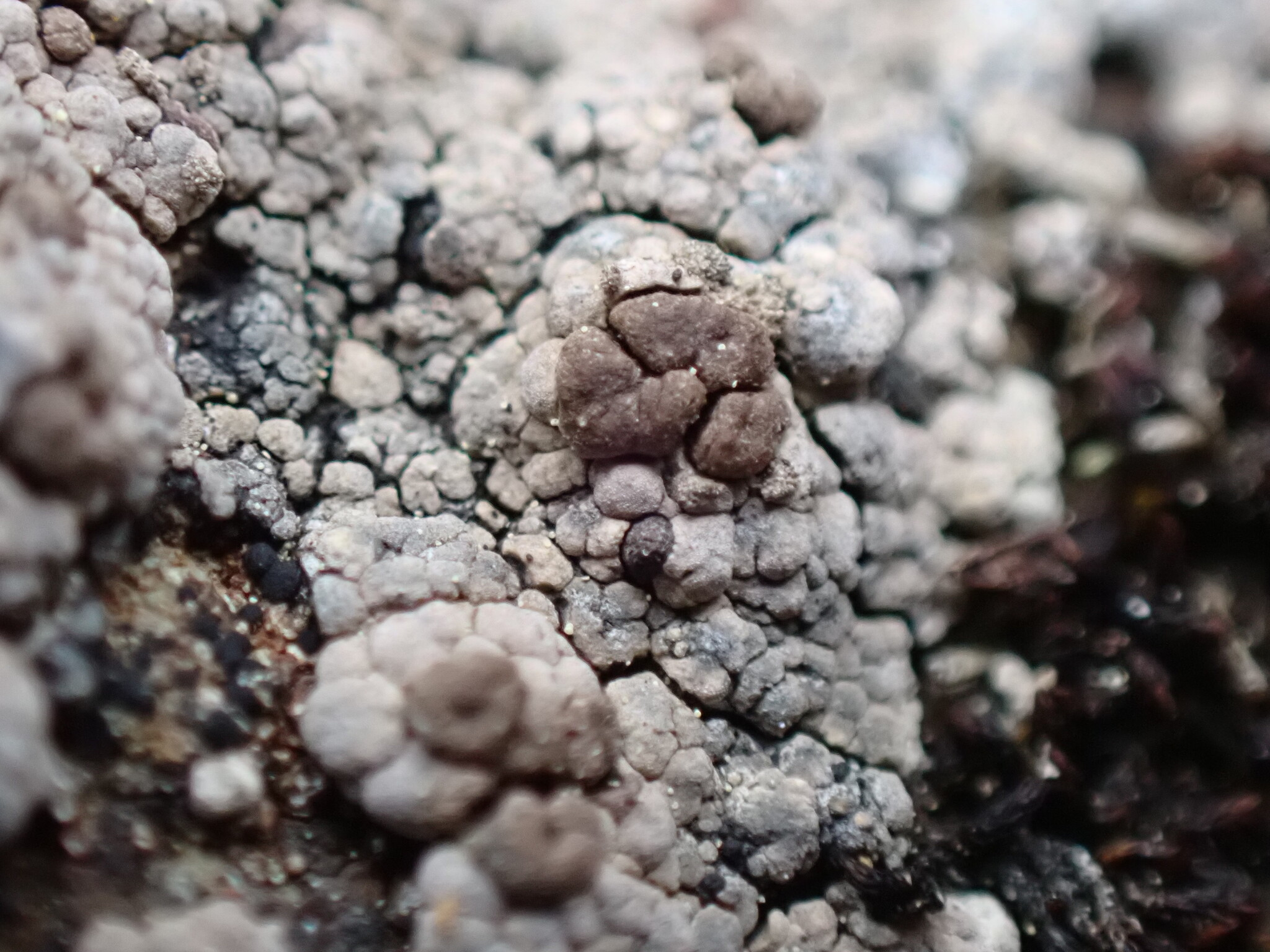
- Amygdalaria haidensis

Scientific classification
- Kingdom: Fungi
- Division: Ascomycota
- Class: Lecanoromycetes
- Order: Lecideales
- Family: Lecideaceae
- Genus: Amygdalaria; Norman (1852)

Type species
- Amygdalaria pelobotryon (Wahlenb.) Norman (1852)

Species
- A. aeolotera A. consentiens A. continua A. elegantior A. haidensis A. panaeola A. pelobotryon A. subdissentiens A. verrucosa

= Amygdalaria =

Genus of lichens

Amygdalaria is a genus of lichen-forming fungi in the family Lecideaceae. These lichens are typically found growing as crusts on siliceous rocks in arctic and alpine environments. Members of this genus form crustose thalli and are distinguished by their unusually large, smooth ascospores enclosed in gelatinous sheaths. The lichens have cephalodia containing Stigonema, a blue-green alga that enables nitrogen fixation.

== Taxonomy ==
The genus was circumscribed in 1852 by the Norwegian botanist Johannes Musæus Norman. In his original description, Norman characterized Amygdalaria as having large, oval, flattened, single-locule spores surrounded by a thickened hyaline wall with white margins. He noted that the apothecia (fruiting bodies) are dish-shaped. Norman distinguished the genus from Pertusaria not only by the similar shape of the spores but also by the open connection of the spore chambers. He initially included two species in the genus: A. verrucosa and A. pelobotryon (the type species).

== Description ==
Amygdalaria forms a firmly attached crust on siliceous rock. Seen close up, the surface is broken into angular, sometimes rather coarse blocks (areoles) that may carry a faint pinkish tint. Scattered in the tiny gaps between these blocks are wart-like cephalodia—specialised pockets that house a second, blue-green alga (Stigonema) and allow the lichen to fix atmospheric nitrogen. The main, green partner is a Trebouxia-type alga, and the internal white layer (medulla) gives no colour reaction with iodine (I–).

The fruiting bodies (apothecia) develop deep inside the areoles; externally one sees only a black to dark-brown disc that is flat or slightly cup-shaped and may sit on a tiny central bump (umbonate). These discs have no rim of thallus tissue (a thalline margin), and the inner cup wall is often poorly formed, consisting of packed, radially arranged hyphae. Under the microscope the spore layer (hymenium) is unusually tall and stains blue in iodine, while the supporting tissue beneath (hypothecium) varies from nearly colourless to dark, carbon-black; when the latter is well developed it forms a small cup and flashes reddish in potassium hydroxide solution. Instead of the usual simple paraphyses, the hymenium contains a web of slender, branched threads whose bead-like upper cells interconnect. Asci are elongate clubs of the Porpidia type, each with a thin amyloid coat and a thickened cap (tholus) pierced by a pore that stains deep blue in iodine. They hold eight large, smooth, single-celled ascospores wrapped in a tight gelatinous envelope. Minute, sunken pycnidia occasionally produce rod-shaped conidia for asexual spread. Chemical tests commonly show gyrophoric acid, sometimes accompanied by lecanoric acid, and occasionally other orcinol-derived lichen products.

== Species ==
- Amygdalaria aeolotera (Vain.) Hertel & Brodo (1987)
- Amygdalaria consentiens (Nyl.) Hertel, Brodo & Mas.Inoue (1984)
- Amygdalaria continua Brodo & Hertel (1987)
- Amygdalaria elegantior (H.Magn.) Hertel & Brodo (1987)
- Amygdalaria haidensis Brodo & Hertel (1987)
- Amygdalaria panaeola (Ach.) Hertel & Brodo (1987)
- Amygdalaria pelobotryon (Wahlenb.) Norman (1852)
- Amygdalaria subdissentiens (Nyl.) Mas.Inoue & Brodo (1984)
