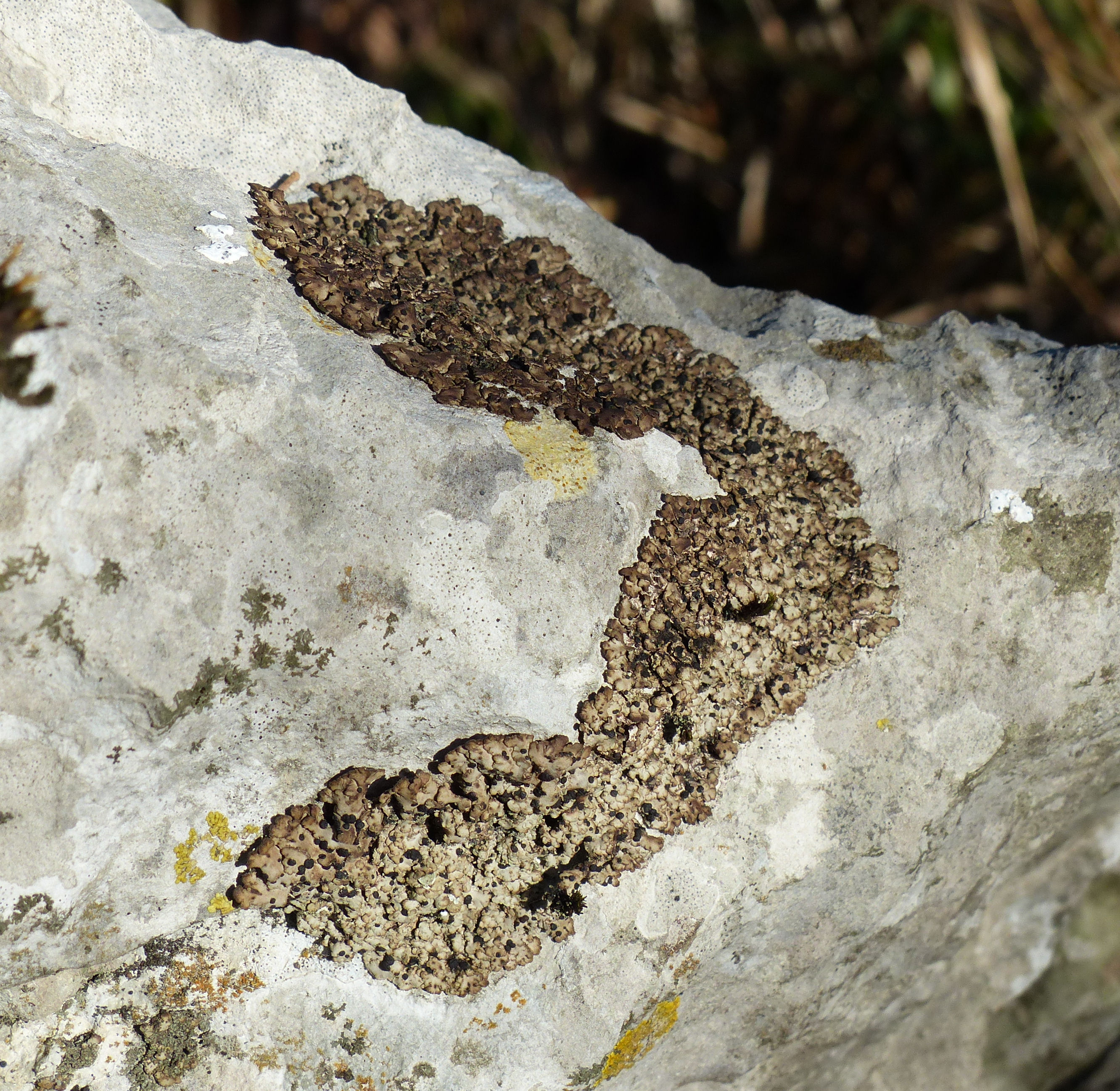
- Romjularia lurida on rock in Italy

Scientific classification
- Domain: Eukaryota
- Kingdom: Fungi
- Division: Ascomycota
- Class: Lecanoromycetes
- Order: Lecideales
- Family: Lecideaceae
- Genus: Romjularia; Timdal (2007)
- Species: R. lurida

Binomial name
- Romjularia lurida (Ach.) Timdal (2007)

Synonyms
- List: Psora lurida (Ach.) DC. (1805); Mycobilimbia lurida (Ach.) Hafellner & Türk (2001); Lichen luridus Sw. (1784); Lecidea lurida Ach. (1803); Biatora petersii Tuck. (1877); Lecidea petersii (Tuck.) Zahlbr. (1925); Psora petersii (Tuck.) Fink (1935)

= Romjularia =

Single-species lichen genus

Romjularia is a fungal genus in the family Lecideaceae, containing the single species Romjularia lurida, a saxicolous and terricolous (rock- and ground-dwelling) squamulose lichen.

== Taxonomy ==
The sole species in Romjularia was originally formally described by the Swedish lichenologist Erik Acharius in 1803, who named it Lecidea lurida. It was transferred to a few different genera in its taxonomic history, including Psora, Lecidea, and Mycobilimbia. Einar Timdal circumscribed the new genus Romjularia in 2007 to contain the species.

== Description ==
Romjularia lurida is a lichen characterised by a squamulose thallus, meaning it consists of small, scale-like structures (squamules) that can grow up to 5 mm long. These scales often become upright as they mature, with their upper surfaces turning brown or pale brown, and their margins curling under. The underside of the thallus is pale in color. The thallus is attached to the substrate by rhizoidal strands, which are root-like structures. The outer layer of the thallus, the cortex, is composed of paraplectenchymatous tissue, a type of tissue made up of tightly packed fungal cells. The upper part of the cortex is brown and has a necrotic layer above it, indicating dead tissue.

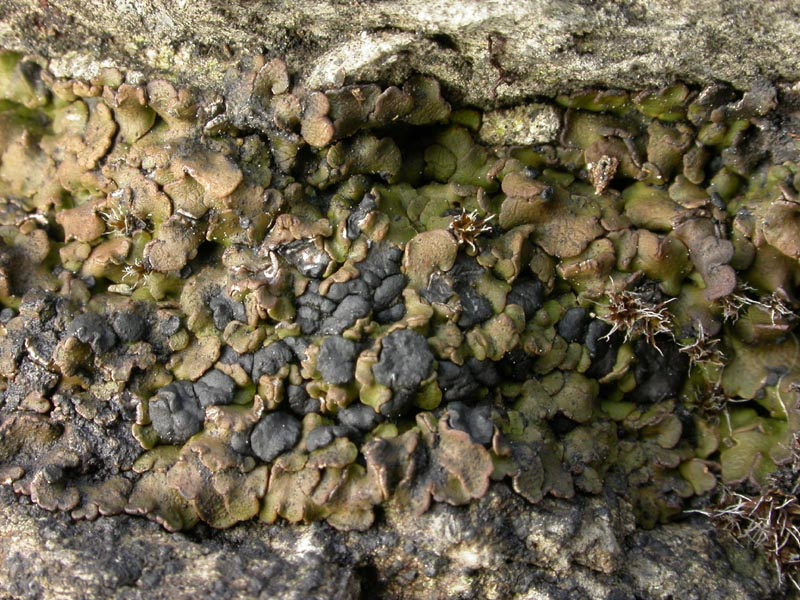
Romjularia lurida from Norway

The apothecia (fruiting bodies) are small, measuring up to 1.5 mm in diameter. They can be found either along the edges (marginal) or on the surface (laminal) of the thallus. These apothecia are convex, red-brown in colour, with an exciple (the outer layer of the apothecia) that is also red-brown, but lightens toward the interior. The internal layers of the apothecia include a brown hypothecium and a hymenium that is 80–100 μm thick. The hymenium reacts to iodine by turning reddish-yellow and then blue after treatment with potassium hydroxide solution.

The apothecia contain asci, which are spore-producing cells that are clavate (club-shaped). The spores are hyaline, smooth, and ellipsoid, measuring 11–14 by 6–7 μm. The lichen also has small, sessile pycnidia—structures involved in asexual reproduction.

Romjularia lurida does not contain specific lichen substances. However, the exciple and epihymenium (the outermost layer of the hymenium) react to hydrochloric acid by turning red, but do not react to potassium hydroxide (K-).

== Habitat and distribution ==
Romjularia lurida is primarily known to occur in temperate regions of Europe, including throughout much of Britain and Ireland. The lichen has also been recorded in North Africa, the Western Asia, and some scattered locations in North America. It grows on siliceous rocks and on calcareous soils in sun-exposed habitats.
