= Schizodiscus =

Scientific classification
- Domain: Eukaryota
- Kingdom: Fungi
- Division: Ascomycota
- Class: Lecanoromycetes
- Order: Lecideales
- Family: Lecideaceae
- Genus: Schizodiscus; Brusse, 1988

Type species
- Schizodiscus afroalpinus Brusse, 1988

Genus of fungi

Schizodiscus is a genus of lichenized fungi within the Lecideaceae family. This is a monotypic genus, containing the single species Schizodiscus afroalpinus.
