= Henry Andrew Imshaug =

American bryologist and lichenologist (1925–2010)

- Born: July 25, 1925; Chicago, Illinois, US
- Died: November 18, 2010 (aged 85); Haslett, Michigan, US
- Education: Columbia College; Hofstra College, New York; University of Michigan Ann Arbor
- Known for: Authority on genus Buellia; collecting and herbarium curation of lichens
- Spouse: Doris
- Children: 4
- Scientific career
- Fields: lichenology
- Workplaces: University of Idaho; Michigan State University
- Doctoral advisors: Edwin Butterworth Mains; Alexander Hanchett Smith
- Doctoral students: Clifford Wetmore, Irwin M. Brodo, Richard C. Harris
- Author abbrev. (botany): Imshaug

Henry Andrew Imshaug (1925–2010) was an American lichenologist notable for work on the genus Buellia and his collection and study of lichens from the Rocky Mountains, Great Lakes region, West Indies and subantarctic islands.

== Early life and education ==
Imshaug was born in Chicago, Illinois, on 25 July 1925 but soon moved with his family to New York where he attended the Stuyvesant High School, then, aged 16, moved on to Columbia College, Columbia University. He was a member of the Torrey Botanical Society. However, he left college in 1943 to join the army and was stationed in Hawaii during the Second World War. In 1948 he graduated from Hofstra College in New York with a BA degree. He then went to University of Michigan in Ann Arbor and was awarded MS in 1949 and a PhD in 1951.

== Research and career ==
In 1953 Imshaug was employed at the University of Idaho. He moved to Michigan State University in 1956 and remained there until he retired in 1990. He received promotions to full professor and Curator of the Cryptogamic Herbarium that contained lichens and also fungi, bryophytes and algae. Working with assistant curators, this collection increased to 150,000 specimens by 1990. In addition, there were 200,000 unmounted specimens, especially from Southern Hemisphere islands, in separate research collections.

Imshaug was notable for his many international field visits to collect specimens and collaborate with other lichenologist, as well as his fieldwork in the USA. In 1952 he undertook fieldwork in Jamaica and Granada supported by a Fulbright scholarship. He participated in the 1972–1973 Auckland Islands Expedition where he studied lichens on the Auckland Islands.

His collection of lichens of the Great Lakes region from the 1950s onwards form a significant part of the herbarium collection. He identified over 100 new species.

He is also known for mentoring numerous notable lichenologists and bryologists.

== Death ad legacy ==
Imshaug's grave at Glendale Cemetery

Imshaug died at his home in Haslett, Michigan on November 18, 2010, and was buried at Glendale Cemetery in Okemos.

Twenty lichen taxa have been named after Imshaug. These include the genera Imshaugia and Imsharria. In addition, two bryophyte species have been named after him.

The Advisory Committee on Antarctic Names assigned his name to the Imshaug Peninsula (70°53'S 61°35'W) in the Antarctic, a broad, snow-covered cove at the south side of Lehrke Inlet on the east coast of Palmer Land in the Antarctic. This was in recognition of his extensive sub-antarctic research.

== Publications and collections ==
Imshaug was the author of 29 publications, almost all as the sole author. They include:

- Imshaug, H. A (1950) New and noteworthy lichens from Mt. Rainier National Park. Mycologia 42 743-752.
- Imshaug, H. A (1957) The lichen genus Pyxine in North and Middle America. Transactions of the American Microscopical Society 76 246-269.
- Imshaug, H. A (1972) R/V Hero Cruise 71-5 to Isla de los Estados (Staten Island). Antarctic Journal 7 42-44.
- O'Donnell, K.L., R.S.Common & H. A.Imshaug. (1977) A new species of Torrubiella on spiders from the Falkland Islands.Mycologia 69 618-622.

In addition, fifty-two taxa were named or combined by Imshaug.

== See also ==
- Category:Taxa named by Henry Andrew Imshaug
