= Hannes Hertel =

German lichenologist, botanist and taxonomist

- Born: February 3, 1939
- Scientific career
- Fields: botanist and taxonomist; mycologist and lichenologist
- Institutions: Botanische Staatssammlung München, Munich (Germany)
- Thesis: On calcicolous species of Lecidea (1967)
- Doctoral advisors: Josef Poelt
- Author abbrev. (botany): Hertel

Hannes Hertel is a German lichenologist and taxonomist and was Director of the State Herbarium in Munich, Germany 1992–2004. His specialist areas are the fungi and lichens.

== Early life and education ==
Hannes Hertel was born in 1939. His doctorate was awarded in 1967 for work on members of the lichen genus Lecidea that thrive on lime rich rocks and sites. This was undertaken under the guidance of Josef Poelt.

== Career ==
He was appointed to an academic post at University of Berlin in 1972 but in 1973 he moved to Munich to take up the post of curator at the State Herbarium in Munich. He became the provisional director from 1985 to 1992 and was then confirmed as Director and remained until his retirement in 2004. His specialist area was the taxonomy of lichens, and especially the genus Lecidea that he had first studied for his doctorate. He and students that he supervised brought order and a critical review of the 1000 accepted and 4000 published names within the genus in the early 1970s. Hannes Hertel was editor of two exsiccata series: Lichenes Alpium et regionum confinium and Lecideaceae exsiccatae.

The State Herbarium in Munich contains the lichen collection of Ferdinand Christian Gustav Arnold, 100,000 - 150,000 specimens collected in the nineteenth century. Hertel made a particular effort to transcribe the detailed labels from Arnold's handwriting that was difficult to read and ensured this was published so that the collection could be more easily used by others.

== Publications ==
Hertel is the author or co-author of several books and scientific publications. They include:

- Peter Dobbeler and Hannes Hertel (2013) Bryophilous ascomycetes everywhere: Distribution maps of selected species on liverworts, mosses and Polytrichaceae. Hertzogia 26 (2) pp361-404
- J Hafellner, H Hertel, G Rambold and E Timdal (1994) Lecanorales pp 379-387 in Ascomycete Systematics: Problems and perspectives in the nineties ed. D L Hawksworth, NATO Advanced Science Institutes Series, Series A, Life Sciences. Plenum Press, New York.
- Edited by Hannes Hertel and Franz Oberwinkler (1985) Festschrift J. Poelt Nova Hedwigia Beihefte Verlag: Lubrecht & Cramer Ltd. ISBN 9783768254793

== Honours and awards ==
In 2004 a Festschrift was held on his 65th birthday to celebrate his contributions to lichenology. Hertel was awarded the Acharius Medal for his lifetime's work that has made an outstanding contributions to lichenology in 2008.

Several genera have been named after Hertel, including Hertelidea Printzen & Kantvilas (2004), Herteliana P.James (1980); and Hertella Henssen (1985). Many species have also been named to honour Hertel. These include: Biatora hertelii Printzen & Etayo (1998); Caloplaca hanneshertelii S.Y.Kondr. & Kärnefelt (2004); Caloplaca hertelii Søchting, Øvstedal & Sancho (2004); Carbacanthographis hertelii Kalb & Staiger (2004); Carbonea herteliana Hafellner & Matzer (1999); Carbonea hertelii Knoph (1999); Cornutispora herteliana Knoph (2004); Homostegia hertelii D.Hawksw., V.Atienza & M.S.Cole (2004); Lecanora herteliana Calat. & Barreno (2000); Lecidea herteliana Fryday & Coppins (2012); Lecidella herteliana Knoph & Leuckert (1994); Lobaria hertelii Sipman (2004); Placopsis hertelii D.J.Galloway (2004); Porpidia herteliana Gowan (1989); Rinodina herteliana Kaschik (2006); Roccella hertelii Mies & M.Schultz (2004); Sphagnum hertelianum H.Crum (2002); and Trapelia herteliana Fryday (2004).

== See also ==
- Category:Taxa named by Hannes Hertel
