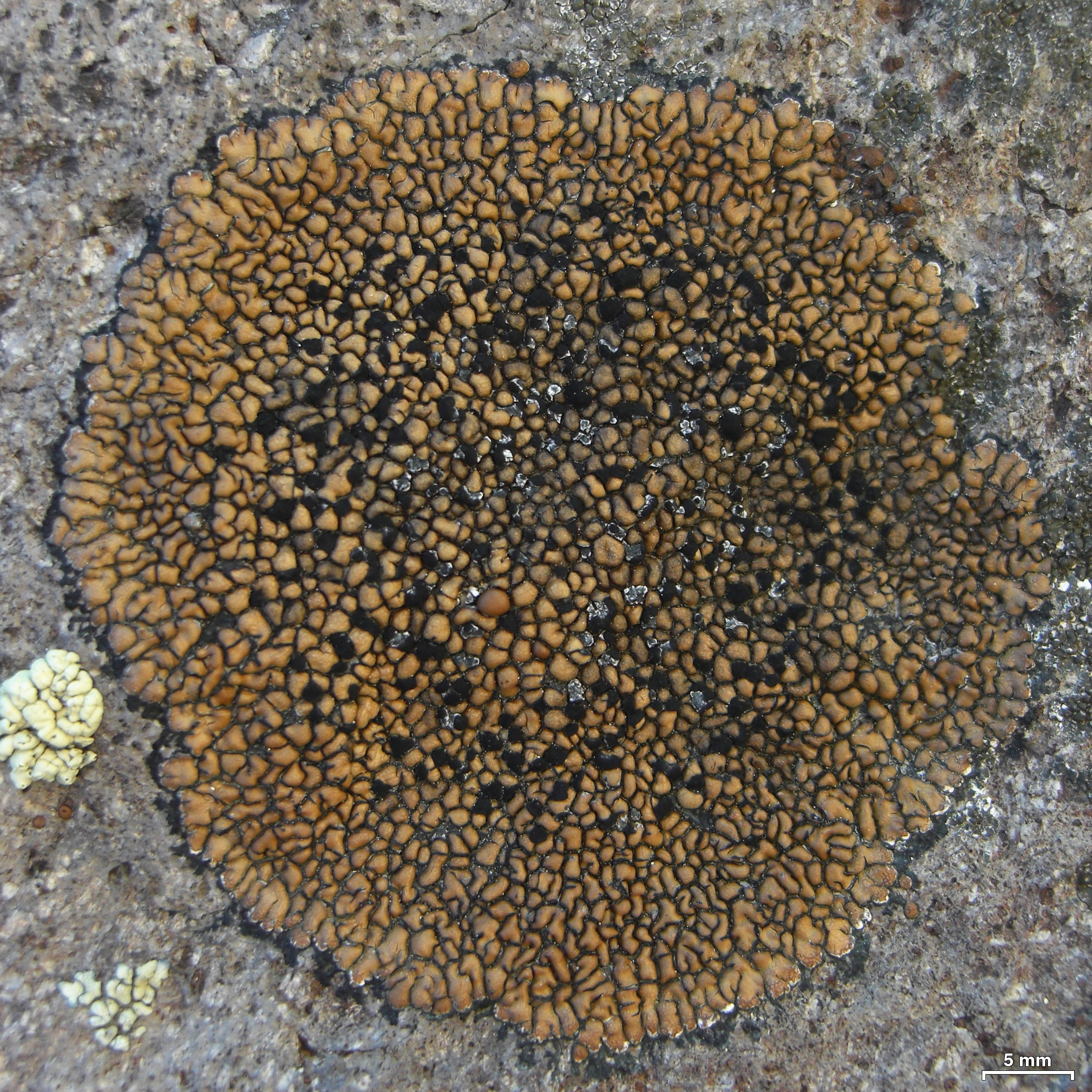
- Lecidea perlatolica

Scientific classification
- Domain: Eukaryota
- Kingdom: Fungi
- Division: Ascomycota
- Class: Lecanoromycetes
- Order: Lecideales; Vain. (1934)

Families
- Lecideaceae; Lopadiaceae

= Lecideales =

Order of lichenized fungi in the class Lecaoromycetes

The Lecideales are an order of lichenized fungi in the class Lecanoromycetes. The order contains two families: the Lecideaceae, which contains 29 genera and about 260 species, and Lopadiaceae, which contains the single genus Lopadium of 10 species. According to Alan Fryday and colleagues in the Revisions of British and Irish Lichens series, "It seems clear that Lopadiaceae does not belong in Lecideales but its true systematic position is unclear."
