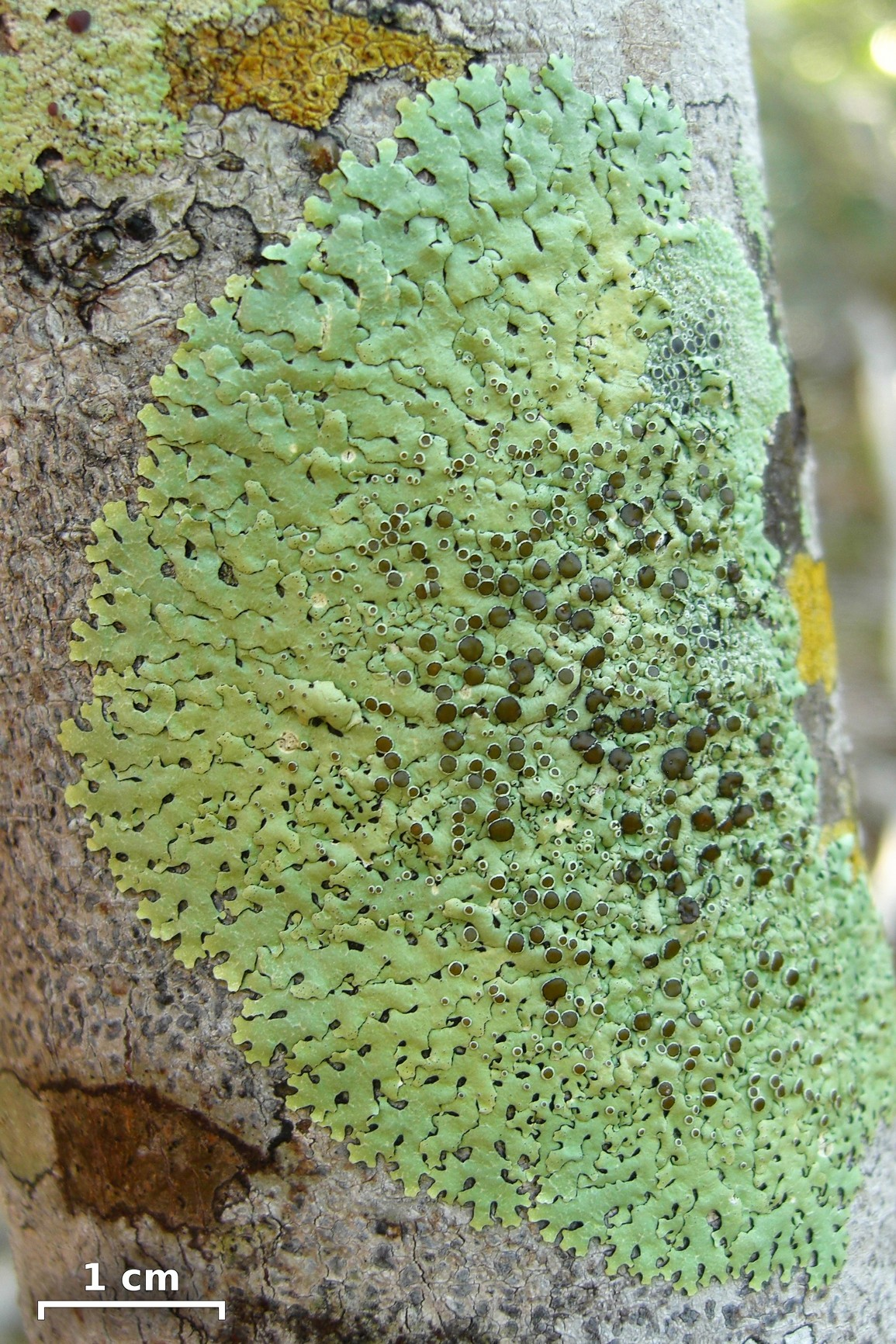
- Relicina eximbricata, in Florida

Scientific classification
- Kingdom: Fungi
- Division: Ascomycota
- Class: Lecanoromycetes
- Order: Lecanorales
- Family: Parmeliaceae
- Genus: Relicina (Hale & Kurok.) Hale (1974)

Type species
- Relicina eumorpha (Hepp) Hale (1974)

Synonyms
- Parmelia ser. Relicinae Hale & Kurok. (1964); Relicinopsis Elix & Verdon (1986)

= Relicina =

Genus of lichen-forming fungi

Relicina is a genus of foliose lichens belonging to the large family Parmeliaceae. Established as a genus in 1974 after initially being treated as a series within Parmelia, Relicina now encompasses about 40 species worldwide. These lichens typically grow as yellow-green, leaf-like patches with flat lobes fringed by short black hairs, attaching to their substrate by a swollen base. The genus is characterized chemically by the presence of usnic acid and various other lichen products, and is distinguished from related groups by details of ascospore structure and surface features.

== Taxonomy ==
Relicina was originally conceived as a series of the large genus Parmelia by lichenologists Mason Hale and Syo Kurokawa in 1964. A decade later, they promoted it to the status of genus.

The genus Relicinopsis, proposed by Australian lichenologists John Elix and Doug Verdon in 1986 as a segregate of Pseudoparmelia, was shown to be nested within Relicina in a 2017 molecular phylogenetics study.

== Description ==
Relicina lichens have a leaf-like (foliose) body (thallus) with flat, two-sided lobes that are typically attached by a somewhat swollen, bulbous base. The edge of each lobe is lined with short, black, hair-like structures called cilia. The upper surface is generally yellow to yellow-green and may sometimes show small spots; it lacks the typical hairs and minute pores (pseudocyphellae) seen in some other lichens. Instead, the surface is covered by a continuous, pored layer (the epicortex). On the underside, the color ranges from pale brown to black, and it bears simple or branched, root-like structures (rhizines) that extend to the edges, helping secure the lichen to its substrate.

The lichen's photosynthetic partner is a green alga similar to those in the genus Trebouxia. Reproduction occurs through apothecia, which are open, disc-like fruiting bodies located on the surface of the lobes. These apothecia have a margin that resembles the thallus (a condition described as lecanorine) and display a solid, uninterrupted disc that ranges in color from pale to dark red-brown. The disc lacks a powdery coating (epruinose) and is surrounded by a cup-shaped layer. The thallus-like margin is smooth or slightly scalloped and is often fringed with cilia at its base; in some cases, this edge appears almost crown-like due to the influence of swollen and bulbous pycnidia.

Inside the apothecia, delicate filament-like cells called paraphyses are present; these are about 2–3 μm thick, mostly straight, and only lightly branched, with their tips being brown, rounded, and slightly expanded. The spore-bearing sacs, or asci, typically contain eight spores each. Each ascus features a well-developed, iodine-reactive (amyloid) zone known as the tholus that is pierced by a narrow, non-reactive central strand with parallel sides; there is no distinct ocular chamber. The resulting sexual spores are simple in structure, translucent (hyaline), ellipsoid in shape, and have walls about 0.5 μm thick.

In addition to these sexual structures, Relicina produces asexual fruiting bodies known as pycnidia. These are embedded in the lichen's surface (laminal and immersed) and often appear somewhat swollen. They release conidia—small, asexual spores—that can be spindle-shaped (bifusiform) or more uniformly cylindrical to fusiform.

Chemically, members of the genus Relicina contain usnic acid along with various other secondary metabolites such as depsidones, depsides, or fatty acids.

== Species ==
As of November 2025, Species Fungorum (in the Catalogue of Life) accepts 37 species of Relicina.

- Relicina abstrusa (Vain.) Hale (1974)
- Relicina agglutinata Elix & J.Johnst. (1986)
- Relicina amphithrix Hale (1975)
- Relicina barringtonensis Elix (1998)
- Relicina circumnodata (Nyl.) Hale (1974)
- Relicina clarkensis Elix & J.Johnst. (1990)
- Relicina colombiana Elix & Sipman (2011)
- Relicina columnaria Elix & J.Johnst. (1990)
- Relicina conglutinata Elix & J.Johnst. (1986)
- Relicina connivens (Kurok.) Hale (1974)
- Relicina dahlii (Hale) Kirika, Divakar & Lumbsch (2017)
- Relicina demethylbarbatica Elix & J.Johnst. (1986)
- Relicina dentata Elix (1996)
- Relicina diederichii Elix (2007)
- Relicina eumorpha Hale (1974)
- Relicina fijiensis Elix & J.Johnst. (1986)
- Relicina filsonii Elix & J.Johnst. (1986)
- Relicina intertexta (Mont. & Bosch) Kirika, Divakar & Lumbsch (2017)
- Relicina kurandensis Elix (1996)
- Relicina limbata (Laurer) Hale (1974)
- Relicina malaccensis (Nyl.) Kirika, Divakar & Lumbsch (2017)
- Relicina niuginiensis Elix & J.Johnst. (1986)
- Relicina palmata Elix (1996)
- Relicina planiuscula (Kurok.) Hale (1974)
- Relicina polycarpa Elix & Polyiam (2003)
- Relicina precircumnodata Hale (1975)
- Relicina rahengensis (Vain.) Kirika, Divakar & Lumbsch (2017)
- Relicina ramboldii Elix & J.Johnst. (1988)
- Relicina ramosissima (Kurok.) Hale (1974)
- Relicina relicinula (Müll. Arg.) Hale (1975)
- Relicina sabahensis Elix (1996)
- Relicina samoensis (Zahlbr.) Hale (1974)
- Relicina schizospatha (Kurok.) Hale (1974)
- Relicina segregata Elix (1996)
- Relicina sipmanii Elix (1996)
- Relicina stevensiae (Elix & J.Johnst.) Kirika, Divakar & Lumbsch (2017)
- Relicina stipitata Elix (1996)
- Relicina subabstrusa (Gyeln.) Hale (1974)
- Relicina subcoronata Elix & J.Johnst. (1990)
- Relicina sublanea (Kurok.) Hale (1974)
- Relicina subnigra Elix & J.Johnst. (1988)
- Relicina sydneyensis (Gyeln.) Hale (1974)
- Relicina terricrocodila Elix & J.Johnst. (1988)
- Relicina vinasii Elix (1996)
- Relicina xanthoparmeliiformis Elix & T.H.Nash (1995)
