= Immersaria venusta =

Scientific classification
- Kingdom: Fungi
- Division: Ascomycota
- Class: Lecanoromycetes
- Order: Lecideales
- Family: Lecideaceae
- Genus: Immersaria
- Species: I. venusta

Binomial name
- Immersaria venusta C.M.Xie & Xin Y.Wang (2022)

Species of lichen-forming fungus

Immersaria venusta is a species of rock-dwelling, crustose lichen-forming fungus in the family Lecideaceae. It is a rusty brown lichen with flat black fruiting bodies, found at alpine elevations of about 3,900–4,300 m in western China. The species was described in 2022 and is distinguished from related species by the shape and colour of its surface patches and its smaller ascospores.

== Taxonomy ==
Immersaria venusta was described as a new species in 2022 by Cong-Miao Xie and Xin-Yu Wang, in a revision of the genus Immersaria (family Lecideaceae). The epithet venusta refers to the attractive appearance of the thallus. The type specimen was collected in western China (Qinghai Province, Maqing County, Xueshan Village) at 4,187 m elevation, growing on rock.

In the authors' phylogenetic analyses, I. venusta forms a distinct lineage and is recovered as the closest relative (sister species) of I. athroocarpa. It is characterised within the genus by its yellow-brown to rusty, cracked patches (areoles), flat black fruiting bodies (apothecia), and a brown uppermost tissue layer (epihymenium). It differs from several similar species: unlike I. shangrilaensis, its areoles tend to split into smaller patches rather than forming aggregated clusters; unlike I. athroocarpa, it lacks strongly convex areoles and has smaller spores; and unlike the orange-thallused I. aurantia, it does not share the distinctly orange surface and predominantly green epihymenium.

== Description ==
The body (thallus) is crustose and areolate, forming a continuous crust that is brown to orange-brown and often rusty in tone. Individual areoles are irregular, often tending towards a rectangular outline, typically 0.5–1.3 mm across, and flat to slightly convex. They are commonly cracked and may be frosted (pruinose), while the thallus margin is also frosted. No distinct border zone (prothallus) was observed in the material studied.

The fruiting bodies (apothecia) are frequent and often crowded, usually sunken in the thallus (though they may appear slightly separated from the areoles), and measure about 0.6–1.0 mm in diameter. The disc is black and flat, without frosting; the margin is reduced but can sometimes be more developed. Under the microscope, the uppermost tissue layer (epihymenium) is brown, and the asci are of the Porpidia-type, each containing eight spores. The ascospores are simple (undivided), oval (ellipsoid), surrounded by a clear halo (halonate), and measure about 10.0–12.5 × 5.0–7.5 μm. The asexual fruiting structures (conidiomata) are sunken, linear, and black with a frosted margin, but asexual spores (conidia) were not observed. Spot tests on the thallus are K− and C−, while the inner tissue (medulla) stains violet with iodine (I+ violet). The chemistry is variable: specimens contained confluentic acid (often with 2'-O-methylmicrophyllinic acid), or planaic acid, or (rarely) no detected substances.

== Habitat and distribution ==
Immersaria venusta is saxicolous, growing on rock including quartz sandstone and granite. It has been collected in alpine climates at elevations of about 3,900–4,300 m. The material treated in the revision comes from western China, with collections from Qinghai Province (including the type locality) and additional specimens cited from Sichuan Province.
