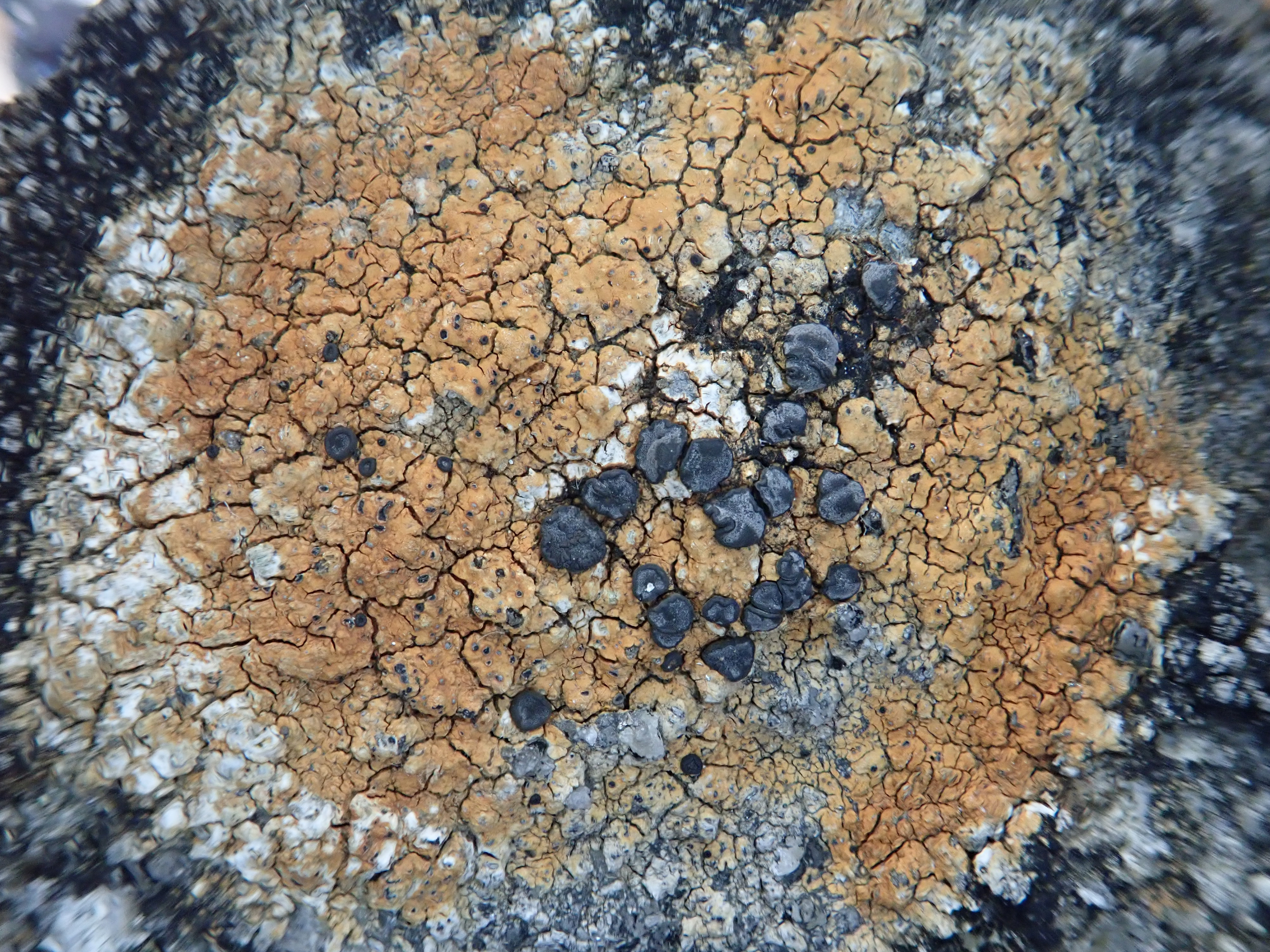
- On Farrenberg mountain, Germany

Conservation status
- Unranked (NatureServe)

Scientific classification
- Kingdom: Fungi
- Division: Ascomycota
- Class: Lecanoromycetes
- Order: Lecideales
- Family: Lecideaceae
- Genus: Porpidia
- Species: P. flavocruenta

Binomial name
- Porpidia flavocruenta Fryday & Buschbom (2005)

= Porpidia flavocruenta =

Species of lichen

Porpidia flavocruenta is a species of saxicolous (rock-dwelling) crustose lichen in the family Lecideaceae. The species forms a bright orange to yellow crust on rock surfaces and is particularly distinctive because of its characteristically black fruiting bodies that often have a greyish or orange dusting on their surface. It grows in cool, damp upland habitats on siliceous rocks, typically in shaded locations such as rock overhangs and cliff faces where moisture levels remain high throughout the year. Although it was only formally described in 2005, earlier specimens from across northern Europe and North America were frequently misidentified as the closely related species P. flavicunda, and it is likely more widespread than current records suggest.

== Taxonomy ==
Porpidia flavocruenta was described as a new species in 2005 by Alan Fryday and Jutta Buschbom as part of a revision of the genus Porpidia in northern and western Europe. In that work it was treated as an orange-thallus member of the P. macrocarpa group, a complex of rock-dwelling crustose lichens that had previously been lumped together under broad names such as P. macrocarpa and P. flavocoerulescens. Before it was formally described, similar material from the Harz Mountains had been set aside informally as P. macrocarpa var. hercynica by Schwab, and British and Irish collections were often referred to as Porpidia aff. flavicunda, reflecting the difficulty of placing them within the existing taxonomy. Later work on material from the Harz Mountains confirmed that Schwab's P. macrocarpa var. hercynica concept corresponds to P. flavocruenta, including a collection from Brocken Mountain made by Th. Schneider in 1932.

Molecular work on Porpidia later showed that this orange, chemically distinctive taxon formed a coherent lineage within the P. macrocarpa clade, corresponding to two previously unnamed operational taxa ("Porpidia sp. 2" and "P. nigrocruenta in the sense of Buschbom & Mueller"), and supported its recognition at species rank. Although P. flavocruenta closely resembles the non-sorediate orange species now called P. flavicunda in the field, it is separated by its lack of stictic acid derivatives in the thallus and by a characteristic crimson colour reaction of pigments in the apothecial tissues when treated with potassium hydroxide. Fryday therefore treated many previous European records of "P. flavocoerulescens/P. flavicunda" with caution, arguing that a substantial proportion almost certainly belong to P. flavocruenta instead. Later work on North American material confirmed that, despite their similar orange thalli, P. flavocruenta and P. flavicunda are not closely related: the former belongs to the P. macrocarpa group (previously treated under the generic name Haplocarpon), whereas P. flavicunda is allied to the P. speirea group that represents the core of Porpidia in the strict sense.

== Description ==
Porpidia flavocruenta forms a thin to moderately thick, yellow–orange crust on rock surfaces, usually cracked into small areoles with an uneven, slightly warted surface from which the fruiting bodies arise; a narrow black border (prothallus) is often visible where it meets other lichens. The fruiting bodies (apothecia) are relatively large for the genus (typically about 1–1.5 mm across), black and round with a persistent raised rim, and often carry a dusting (pruina) that makes the disc appear grey or orange; they sit on the surface of the thallus and are slightly pinched in at the base. Field workers in the Harz have emphasised that the combination of a bright orange thallus and usually strongly pruinose apothecia makes the species relatively easy to recognise on exposed rock faces.

In section the hymenium is clear and stains blue with iodine, and it overlies a dark brown tissue (hypothecium) and a strongly pigmented apothecial rim (excipulum) made of thick-walled cells whose inner part is orange-brown and whose outer edge is blue-black; when this tissue is treated with potassium hydroxide solution (the K test) it releases a vivid crimson solution, a distinctive pigment reaction that helps separate the species from similar orange Porpidia taxa. The microscopic fertile layer contains abundant, very slender, branched filaments (paraphyses) with only slightly swollen tips, and cylindrical asci that produce simple, colourless, ellipsoid spores surrounded by a clear halo, measuring 15–19 × 8–10 micrometres. Asexual reproductive structures (pycnidia) are frequent: they appear as tiny black dots with a narrow orange rim and produce rod-shaped conidia. Standard spot tests on the thallus are negative and thin-layer chromatography detects no characteristic lichen substances.

== Habitat and distribution ==
Porpidia flavocruenta is a saxicolous (rock-dwelling) lichen that grows on siliceous, usually acidic rocks in cool, moist upland environments. In the British Isles it has been recorded from numerous sites in the Scottish Highlands and in upland Wales, typically on boulders and crags in shaded rock overhangs or other persistently damp microhabitats. Beyond Britain and Ireland it has been found in northern Sweden around Abisko and in the Austrian Alps, as well as in Norway and Iceland, usually in similar montane settings, and it is also known from North America. Fryday suggested that many past records filed under the closely similar orange species P. flavicunda probably include misidentified P. flavocruenta, so the species is likely to be more widespread than current confirmed records suggest. It was reported for the first time from Poland in 2010, from basalt outcrops in the Mały Śnieżny Kocioł cirque in the Karkonosze Mountains of the Sudetes, where it is known from a single montane locality. In central Germany it has been found on granite boulder fields near the summit of Brocken in the Harz National Park, where it was rediscovered in 2016 after an earlier record from 1932.

In North America it is known from the North Slope of northern Alaska and from eastern Canada, where it was reported as new to Canada from the Avalon Peninsula of Newfoundland; there it grows on sedimentary rock outcrops in ombrotrophic heath–bogs of the Maritime Barrens ecoregion, and the Newfoundland collection together with a small number of herbarium vouchers represent the only confirmed Canadian records, suggesting that the species has often been overlooked for P. flavicunda.
