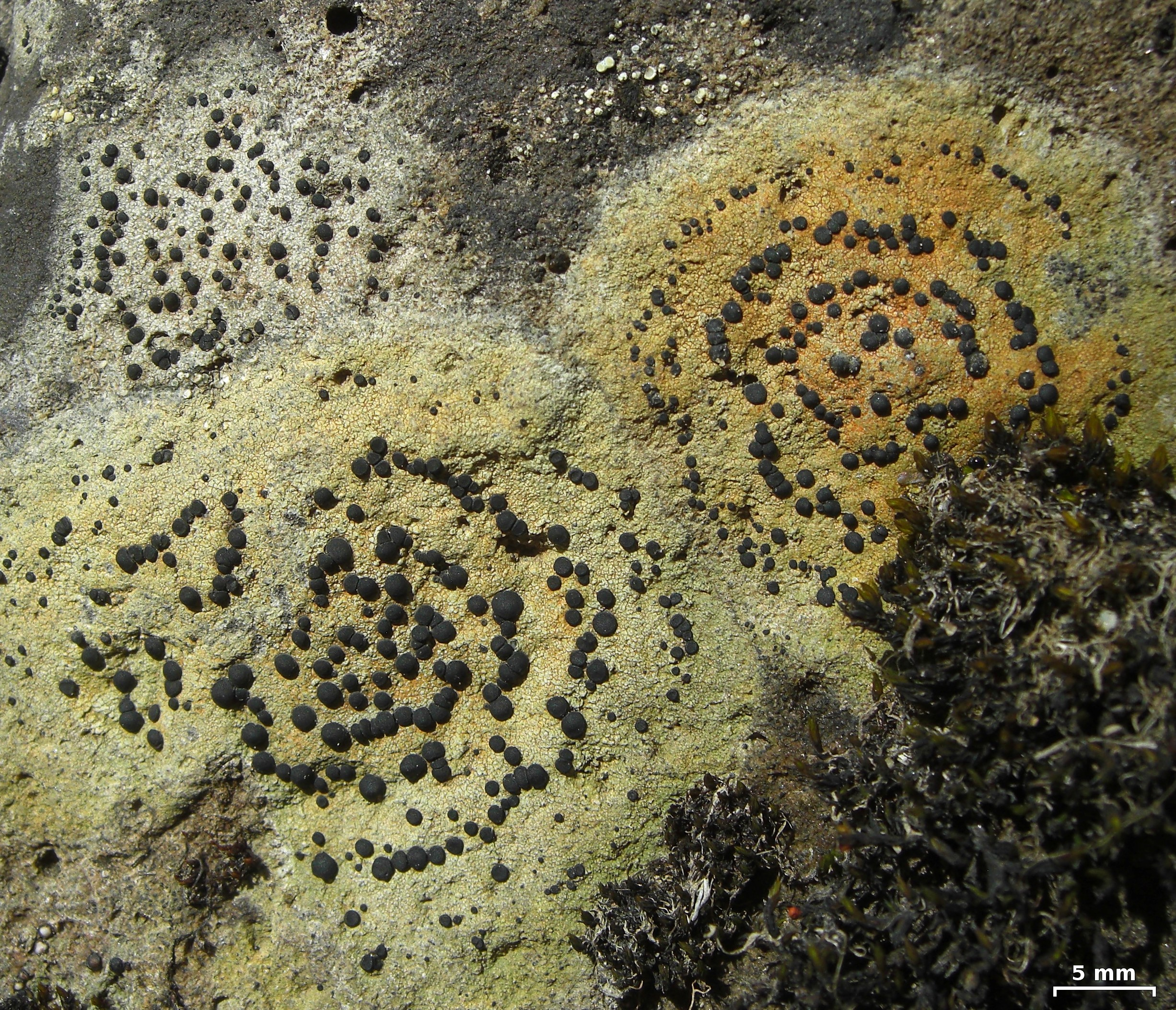

Conservation status
- Secure (NatureServe)

Scientific classification
- Kingdom: Fungi
- Division: Ascomycota
- Class: Lecanoromycetes
- Order: Lecideales
- Family: Lecideaceae
- Genus: Porpidia
- Species: P. crustulata

Binomial name
- Porpidia crustulata (Ach.) Hertel & Knoph (1984)

Synonyms
- Lecidea parasema var. crustulata Ach. (1810)

= Porpidia crustulata =

Species of lichen-forming fungus

Porpidia crustulata is a species of crustose lichen in the genus Porpidia, commonly known as the concentric boulder lichen.

== Description ==
The common name "concentric boulder lichen" refers to the striking concentric circles of dark apothecia (fruiting bodies) that often develop on top of the light gray thallus. P. crustulata specimens are sometimes mistaken for their close relatives Porpidia macrocarpa, but P. crustulata can be distinguished by its smaller apothecia and thinner margin.

Porpidia crustulata has been measured to grow at a rate of 0.4–0.6 mm in diameter per year. The same study indicated that the photobiont layer thins as the lichen grows, potentially limiting the maximum size of individual lichens to around 8 cm diameter. Additionally, the study used scanning electron microscopy to identify the partner photobionts of their sampled lichens as two variants from the genus Chlorella: Chlorella "sp. GC" and free-living Chlorella sorokiniana.

== Range ==
Porpidia crustulata have been observed over a wide range, including the Americas, Africa, Eurasia, Australia, and Greenland. It can live in climates ranging from temperate to alpine/arctic.

In North America it is more common in eastern temperate and southern boreal regions, and rarer in the west.

== Habitat ==
Porpidia crustulata is thought to prefer siliceous rocks, especially pebbles, in exposed locations. However, it has also been observed growing on non-calcareous rocks like sandstone and granite, bricks, mortar, an old leather shoe, and wood.
