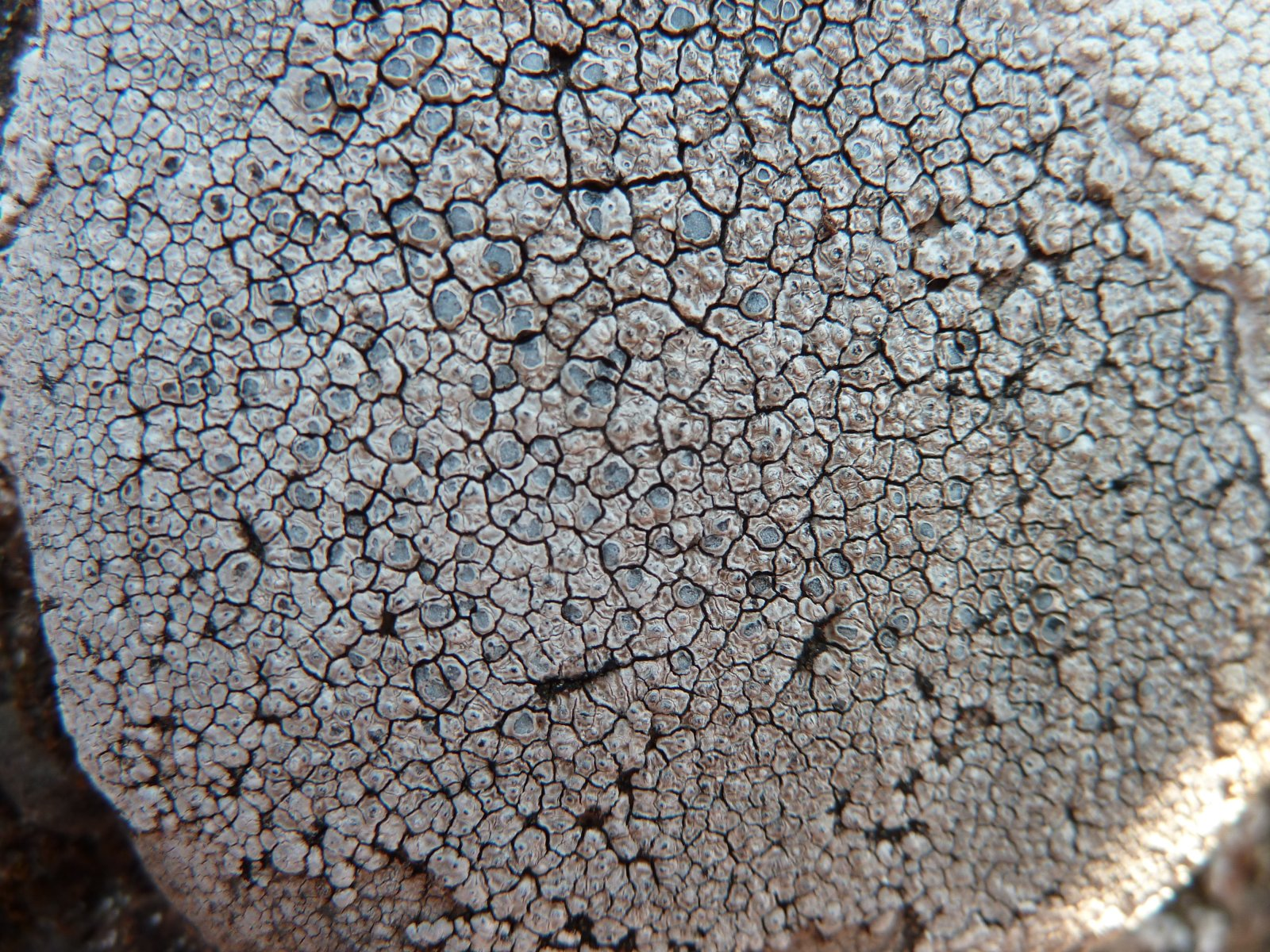
- Immersaria athroocarpa

Scientific classification
- Kingdom: Fungi
- Division: Ascomycota
- Class: Lecanoromycetes
- Order: Lecideales
- Family: Lecideaceae
- Genus: Immersaria; Rambold & Pietschm. (1989)

Type species
- Immersaria athroocarpa (Ach.) Rambold & Pietschm. (1989)

Species
- See text

= Immersaria =

Genus of lichen-forming fungi

Immersaria is a genus of lichen-forming fungi in the family Lecideaceae. Species in the genus form brown to orange-brown crusts on rock, often with a waxy or glossy surface. They are characterised by dark, sunken fruiting bodies that lack the prominent rim seen in some related genera. The genus occurs in Europe, Asia, and the Southern Hemisphere, typically in alpine or montane habitats.

== Taxonomy ==
The genus was circumscribed in 1989 by the lichenologists Gerhard Rambold and M. Pietschmann, with Immersaria athroocarpa assigned as the type species. The boundaries of Immersaria were emended in 2022 following the use of molecular phylogenetics to assess the phylogenetic relationships of species in the genus. The study led to the division of Immersaria into two distinct clades: one comprising species with lecideine apothecia and the other containing species with lecanorine apothecia. As a result, the lecanorine species previously grouped under Immersaria have now been reclassified into the newly proposed genus Lecaimmeria.

== Description ==
The genus Immersaria presents with a crustose (crust-like) thallus that has shades ranging from yellow-brown, red-brown, orange-brown to simple brown. This crust may occasionally show a rusty colour and typically forms irregular to rectangular patches, often with a waxy, glossy finish. The edges may be dusted with a fine, white powder (pruinose), and the areolae (small cracked segments) can merge around a black base layer (prothallus), creating larger patches. The margin of the thallus might be clearly defined or sometimes non-existent. The upper part of the thallus contains an orange pigment but lacks a lower cortex; instead, the core (medulla) is packed with grey granules. The layer containing the algae is uninterrupted, ensuring the lichen's ability to photosynthesise.

The apothecia (fruiting bodies) are of the lecideine type, meaning they are generally sunken into the thallus and can range from round to irregular in shape. The disc of these structures is typically black and flat or slightly concave, with a reduced margin that is sometimes faintly elevated but often not well defined, and it may or may not be pruinose. The exciple (the rim surrounding the apothecium) is nearly non-existent or sometimes developed and brown.

Inside the apothecia, the hymenium (spore-producing layer) is colourless, with simple paraphyses (filament-like structures) that may branch rarely, with possible connections (anastomosing). The epihymenium (uppermost layer) varies from brown to green or a mix of both, sitting atop a colourless or pale brown subhymenium, with the hypothecium (the tissue below the hymenium) ranging from pale brown to darker brown.

The asci (spore sacs) of Immersaria are of the Porpidia-type, cylindrical and typically contain eight spores, which are ellipsoid and surrounded by a clear halo (halonate) but do not turn blue-black (non-amyloid) when stained. Pycnidia (structures producing asexual spores or conidia) may or may not be present and are submerged within the thallus, linear or star-shaped, black, and often with a pruinose margin. The conidia themselves are rod-shaped (bacilliform).

== Species ==
As of January 2025, Species Fungorum (in the Catalogue of Life) accept seven species of Immersaria.

- Immersaria athroocarpa (Ach.) Rambold & Pietschm. (1989)
- Immersaria aurantia C.M.Xie & Li S.Wang (2022) – China
- Immersaria ferruginea C.M.Xie & Li S.Wang (2022) – China
- Immersaria fuliginosa Fryday (2014)
- Immersaria olivacea Calat. & Rambold (1998) – Europe
- Immersaria pruinosa M.S.Iqbal, Alla Ud Din, Khalid & Niazi (2024) – Pakistan
- Immersaria shangrilaensis C.M.Xie & Lu L.Zhang (2022) – China
- Immersaria usbekica (Hertel) M.Barbero, Nav.-Ros. & Cl.Roux (1990) – Uzbekistan
- Immersaria venusta C.M.Xie & Xin Y.Wang (2022) – China
