= Relicina ramboldii =

Scientific classification
- Kingdom: Fungi
- Division: Ascomycota
- Class: Lecanoromycetes
- Order: Lecanorales
- Family: Parmeliaceae
- Genus: Relicina
- Species: R. ramboldii

Binomial name
- Relicina ramboldii Elix & J.Johnst. (1988)
- Holotype: Mount Baga, Queensland, Australia

Species of lichen-forming fungus

Relicina ramboldii is a species of saxicolous (rock-dwelling) foliose lichen in the family Parmeliaceae. Described in 1988 from Mount Baga in Queensland, this lichen forms pale greenish leaf-like patches on basalt rocks with narrow lobes edged with black hair-like projections. It rarely produces fruiting bodies, instead reproducing mainly through small outgrowths (isidia) on its upper surface. The species is known only from central Queensland, where it grows on partially shaded rock walls at moderate elevations.

== Taxonomy ==
Relicina ramboldii was described as a new species in 1988 by the Australian lichenologists John Elix and Jen Johnston. The type specimen was collected by the German lichenologist Gerhard Rambold on partially shaded basaltic rock walls with a southerly aspect on Mount Baga (formerly Mount Jim Crow), at 200–230 m elevation.

In a later treatment of the genus, Elix and Johnston regarded Relicina ramboldii as the isidiate counterpart of the fertile species R. clarkensis from central Queensland.

== Description ==
Relicina ramboldii forms foliose (leaf-like) thalli that grow tightly attached to rock surfaces, pale green to yellow-green and up to about 8 cm across, with narrow linear lobes about 1–2 mm wide whose swollen margins are fringed with conspicuous black cilia. The upper surface is flat to slightly convex, with shiny lobe tips that become cracked and bear relatively sparse, simple isidia as the thallus ages, while the lower surface is brown and densely covered with black, branched rhizines. Apothecia (fruiting bodies) are rare and small, appearing as dark brown discs on the thallus surface, and minute, dot-like pycnidia immersed in the thallus produce asexual conidia.

In standard spot tests the cortex is K−, while the medulla reacts K+ (yellow-red), C− and P+ (orange). The lichen produces usnic acid together with hypostictic acid (minor), stictic acid (major), traces of constictic acid and minor amounts of menegazziaic acid in the medulla.

=== Similar species ===
Elix and Johnston considered R. ramboldii to be closely related to Relicina sydneyensis, as both species have narrow elongate lobes with isidia, ecoronate apothecia, a brown lower surface and stictic acid in the medulla. They distinguished R. ramboldii by its sparser, simple, roughly spherical to short-cylindrical isidia and by the chemistry of its medulla: it contains hypostictic, stictic and menegazziaic acids, whereas R. sydneyensis has stictic, constictic and norstictic acids. R. ramboldii is known only from saxicolous habitats in central Queensland.

== Habitat and distribution ==
The species grows on basaltic rock surfaces in central Queensland. The type collection was made on partially shaded rock walls with a southerly aspect on Mount Baga at 200–230 m altitude, and a further specimen was gathered from vertical and overhanging faces of easterly exposed rock outcrops on nearby Mount Archer at around 480 m elevation. On the basis of the available material, Elix and Johnston regarded Relicina ramboldii as a saxicolous lichen with a distribution confined to central Queensland.
