= Immersaria fuliginosa =

Scientific classification
- Kingdom: Fungi
- Division: Ascomycota
- Class: Lecanoromycetes
- Order: Lecideales
- Family: Lecideaceae
- Genus: Immersaria
- Species: I. fuliginosa

Binomial name
- Immersaria fuliginosa Fryday (2014)

Species of lichen-forming fungus

Immersaria fuliginosa is a species of rock-dwelling, lichen-forming fungus in the family Lecideaceae. It is a pale to red-brown, crust-forming lichen distinguished by the production of tiny blue-black vegetative granules (thalloconidia) from its dark border tissue, a feature reported as the first of its kind in the family. The species was described in 2014 and is known only from exposed rock outcrops in the mountains of West Falkland.

== Taxonomy ==
Immersaria fuliginosa was described as new to science in 2014 by Alan Fryday from material collected in the Falkland Islands. The type specimen was gathered on exposed rock outcrops on West Falkland (at a pass south-west of Mt Maria, roughly 610 m elevation), during lichen-collecting fieldwork by Henry Imshaug and Richard C. Harris in January 1968.

The species is separated from other members of Immersaria by its production of thalloconidia: minute, blue-black vegetative propagules formed from the fungal thallus. In I. fuliginosa these propagules are produced in quantity from the black prothallus (the dark marginal tissue between areoles), which becomes broken down into thalloconidia and gives the thallus a rough, granular-looking boundary around the areoles. Fryday noted that thalloconidia are uncommon in lichen-forming fungi and treated this as the first report of the feature in the family Lecideaceae.

== Description ==
The lichen body (thallus) forms a crust of scattered to locally merging patches (areoles, typically 0.1–0.4 mm across) that are pale to red-brown and flat to shallowly concave. Each patch is edged by a dark zone derived from the black border layer (prothallus), which breaks apart into tiny dispersal granules (thalloconidia). Towards the thallus margin, the areoles may become larger and merge into a more continuous crust. In cross-section, the outer skin (cortex) is weakly developed (about 10–20 µm thick) beneath a conspicuous clear dead layer (epinecral layer, typically about 70–120 (less often up to 150) µm).

The algal partner (photobiont) is a green, rounded (chlorococcoid) alga, arranged as a distinct horizontal layer near the base of the areoles; the algal cells are thick-walled and about 7–12 µm in diameter. The inner tissue (medulla) stains violet with iodine (I+ violet).

The fruiting bodies (apothecia) are infrequent and of the lecideine type (with a fungal rim rather than a thallus-derived rim), remaining sunken in the thallus. The disc is dark brown to black and concave, and may appear browner when wet. The asci are of the Porpidia-type, and the ascospores are simple (undivided), colourless (hyaline), thinly surrounded by a clear halo (halonate), and measure about 16–18 × 6–8 µm. Secondary metabolites reported from the thallus include 2-O-methylperlatolic acid and confluentic acid (detected by thin-layer chromatography).

== Habitat and distribution ==
Immersaria fuliginosa is known only from two collections made in mountainous parts of West Falkland, where it grows on exposed rock outcrops at roughly 610–700 m elevation. Both gatherings came from open, high-ground habitats (including feldmark at the second locality), demonstrating a preference for cool, windswept sites above the coastal lowlands.

At the type locality it was recorded with several other saxicolous lichens, including Rhizocarpon geographicum agg., a species of Lecidea, Pertusaria spegazzinii, and Poeltidea perusta. Fryday remarked that it can resemble P. perusta in overall appearance and may occur alongside it, but differs in the thalloconidial prothallus and in having smaller, hyaline ascospores.
