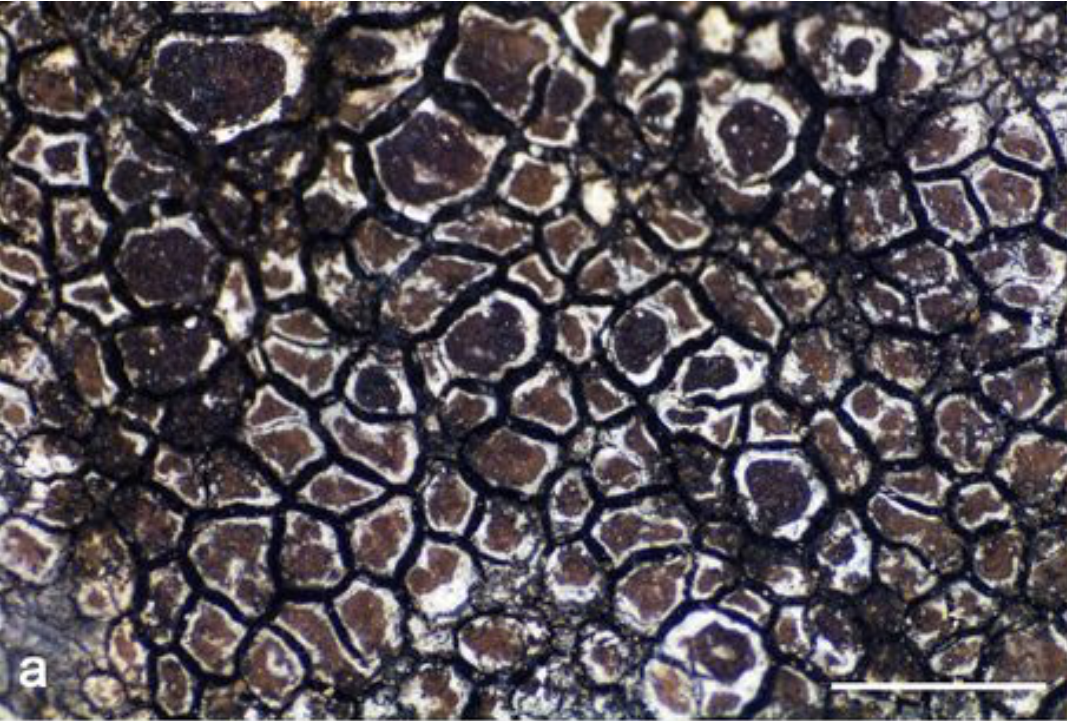
- Thallus surface of Lecaimmeria orbicularis; scale bar = 1 mm

Scientific classification
- Kingdom: Fungi
- Division: Ascomycota
- Class: Lecanoromycetes
- Order: Lecideales
- Family: Lecideaceae
- Genus: Lecaimmeria; C.M.Xie, Lu L.Zhang & Li S.Wang (2022)

Type species
- Lecaimmeria orbicularis C.M.Xie & Lu L.Zhang (2022)

Species
- See text

= Lecaimmeria =

Genus of lichens

Lecaimmeria is a genus of lichen-forming fungi in the family Lecideaceae. Established in 2022, it comprises 13 species of lichens that grow on rock surfaces (saxicolous) and form a thin, crust-like covering (crustose) on their substrate. These lichens are characterised by their glossy, orange to red-brown outer layer (thallus) and sunken fruiting bodies (apothecia) with red-brown centres. Lecaimmeria species are typically found in harsh environments at high altitudes or latitudes, particularly in mountainous regions of western China and across parts of Eurasia. The genus was created to accommodate species previously classified under Immersaria that shared certain distinct features, following molecular analysis that revealed they formed a separate group.

== Taxonomy ==
Lecaimmeria was circumscribed as a new genus in 2024 by Cong-Miao Xie, Lu-Lu Zhang, and Li-Song Wang to accommodate species previously placed in Immersaria that have lecanorine apothecia. The type species is Lecaimmeria orbicularis. Phylogenetic analyses showed that species of Immersaria with lecanorine apothecia formed a distinct clade separate from those with lecideine apothecia. This lecanorine clade was found to be more closely related to other lecanorine genera like Bellemerea and Koerberiella than to the lecideine Immersaria species. Based on these results, the new genus Lecaimmeria was established to contain the lecanorine species.

Lecaimmeria can be distinguished from related genera by its glossy, orange to red-brown thallus with an amyloid medulla, immersed lecanorine apothecia with red-brown discs, orange epihymenium with an epinecral layer, and Porpidia-type asci with halonate, non-amyloid ascospores. The genus name combines Leca- (referring to the lecanorine apothecia) with -immeria (from Immersaria, the genus from which these species were segregated).

== Description ==
Lecaimmeria lichens form a crustose thallus, meaning they grow as a thin crust tightly attached to their substrate. The thallus colour ranges from red-brown to orange-brown or dark brown, and has a waxy, glossy appearance. The thallus is composed of small, irregular or somewhat rectangular sections called areoles, which may be continuous or separated. The edges of these areoles are often white or sometimes black, and may have a powdery (pruinose) appearance.

The upper surface of the thallus has several distinct layers. The topmost layer, called the upper cortex, contains orange pigment granules. Beneath this is a clear layer known as the epinecral layer, followed by an algal layer containing the photobiont cells (the algal partner in the lichen symbiosis). The central part of the thallus, called the medulla, is filled with greyish granules. There is no lower cortex.

The apothecia (fruiting bodies) are of the lecanorine type, meaning they have a rim (or margin) that contains algal cells and is the same colour as the thallus. These apothecia are sunken into the thallus (described as immersed) and can be round or irregular in shape. The central part of the apothecium (the disc) is red-brown, dark red-brown, or dark orange-brown and can be flat or slightly concave.

The apothecia contain asci, which are microscopic sac-like structures that produce spores. In Lecaimmeria, these asci are of the Porpidia-type and typically contain eight spores each. The spores are ellipsoid in shape and have a transparent envelope around them (described as "halonate"). Lecaimmeria may also have structures called pycnidia, which produce another type of reproductive cell called conidia. These pycnidia, when present, are usually sunken into the thallus and appear as small, black, linear or star-shaped spots.

When tested with chemical spot tests commonly used in lichen identification, the thallus shows no colour change with K or C. However, the medulla turns blue when iodine is applied (I+). Some species contain lichen substances such as gyrophoric acid or 4-O-demethylplanaic acid, while others have no detectable substances.

== Habitat and distribution ==
Lecaimmeria lichens are saxicolous organisms, primarily growing on rock surfaces. They show a strong preference for siliceous substrates, particularly granite and sandstone, though one species, L. tuberculosa, has been found growing on Qilian jade.

These lichens grow in harsh, exposed environments characterised by high altitude or latitude. They are commonly found in alpine zones, typically at elevations ranging from 3,100 to 4,800 metres above sea level in the mountainous regions of western China, including areas such as the Qinghai-Tibetan Plateau. In these extreme habitats, Lecaimmeria species must withstand intense ultraviolet radiation, extreme temperature fluctuations, and low moisture availability. Some species also occur in high-altitude desert-steppe areas, which represent transitional zones between alpine and arid environments where vegetation is sparse and rocky outcrops are common. In northern regions like Inner Mongolia, Lecaimmeria can be found in high-latitude steppes at lower elevations, typically between 1,200 and 1,900 metres. These areas are characterised by cold, dry climates and open grasslands interspersed with rock formations.

The known distribution of Lecaimmeria is primarily centred in Asia, with most species described from China, particularly from the provinces of Qinghai, Sichuan, Tibet, and Inner Mongolia. However, the genus is not limited to this region. Some species have been reported from other parts of Eurasia, including various European countries, Iran, Macedonia, Mongolia, Romania, and Russia. This distribution pattern suggests that Lecaimmeria may be more widespread in similar habitats across the Palearctic realm.

== Species ==
As of August 2024, Species Fungorum (in the Catalogue of Life), accept 11 species of Lecaimmeria, but this total does not include two new species described from Pakistan, and added to the genus in 2024.

- Lecaimmeria asiatica Asghar, Oryakhil, Naseer & Khalid (2024) – Pakistan
- Lecaimmeria botryoides C.M.Xie & Xin Y.Wang (2022) – China
- Lecaimmeria crispula Niazi, Nadeem & Afshan (2024) – Pakistan
- Lecaimmeria cupreoatra (Nyl.) C.M.Xie (2022) – Europe; Mongolia; Russia
- Lecaimmeria iranica (Valadb., Sipman & Rambold) C.M.Xie (2022) – Iran; China
- Lecaimmeria lygaea C.M.Xie & Lu L.Zhang (2022) – China
- Lecaimmeria mehadiana (Calat. & Rambold) C.M.Xie (2022) – Romania
- Lecaimmeria mongolica C.M.Xie & Lu L.Zhang (2022) – Inner Mongolia
- Lecaimmeria orbicularis C.M.Xie & Lu L.Zhang (2022) – China
- Lecaimmeria pakistanica K.Habib, Zulfiqar & Khalid (2022) – Pakistan
- Lecaimmeria qinghaiensis C.M.Xie & Li S.Wang (2022) – China; Iran
- Lecaimmeria tibetica C.M.Xie & Xin Y.Wang (2022) – Tibet
- Lecaimmeria tuberculosa C.M.Xie & Xin Y.Wang (2022) – China
