= Lecaimmeria iranica =

Scientific classification
- Kingdom: Fungi
- Division: Ascomycota
- Class: Lecanoromycetes
- Order: Lecideales
- Family: Lecideaceae
- Genus: Lecaimmeria
- Species: L. iranica

Binomial name
- Lecaimmeria iranica (Valadb., Sipman & Rambold) C.M.Xie (2022)
- Type locality: Haraz road, near Amol, Iran

Synonyms
- Immersaria iranica Valadb., Sipman & Rambold (2011)

Species of lichen-forming fungus

Lecaimmeria iranica is a species of crustose lichen in the family Lecideaceae. It forms a brown, cracked crust on rock, with the small fruiting bodies (apothecia) typically sunken into the thallus surface. The species was originally described in 2011 as Immersaria iranica and was transferred to the newly established genus Lecaimmeria in 2022. It can be distinguished from related species by its conspicuous pycnidia, which open by star-shaped cracks. The lichen occurs on calcareous and siliceous rock in montane steppes in Iran, Armenia, Kazakhstan, and China (Xinjiang/Inner Mongolia).

== Taxonomy ==
The species was described as a new species in 2011 by Tahereh Valadbeigi, Harrie Sipman and Gerhard Rambold, as Immersaria iranica, based on material collected in Iran. The holotype was collected from Mazandaran province (Haraz road, near Amol) on calcareous rock at 1,475 m elevation. The species epithet iranica refers to its occurrence in Iran.

In 2022, Cong-Miao Xie and co-authors revised Immersaria using morphological characters and a multi-locus phylogeny of Lecideaceae, and concluded that the lecanorine species previously placed in Immersaria form a separate lineage. They described the new genus Lecaimmeria (named for its immersed lecanorine apothecia) for this group and made the new combination Lecaimmeria iranica.

The species matches the genus concept of Lecaimmeria in having an areolate brown thallus with an iodine-positive (I+) medulla, immersed lecanorine apothecia, Porpidia-type asci, and simple, halonate ascospores. It can be distinguished from other described members of the genus by its conspicuous asexual morphology (pycnidia that open by stellate, winding cracks) and, in the Iranian type material, by the presence of 2'-O-methylsuperphyllinic acid as the major secondary metabolite.

== Description ==
The thallus is crustose and areolate (broken into small, discrete patches), forming colonies several centimetres across. Its surface is brown to slightly reddish brown, dull and smooth. The areoles are typically 0.5–1 mm wide, flat to slightly convex, sometimes weakly undulate, and may show irregular grooves that divide the surface into crystal-like warts. Many areoles have rounded, whitish rims with darker sides. A black to bluish-black (or sometimes whitish) hypothallus is often visible between areoles. In cross-section, the thallus is about 0.3–0.5 mm thick, with an epinecral layer about 15–25 μm thick and a white medulla that stains violet with iodine (I+ violet). The photobiont is chlorococcoid (green algal), with roughly spherical cells.

The apothecia are typically immersed, usually one per areole, about 0.3–0.6 mm across, round to lobed, and sometimes bordered by a white rim. The disc is flat to slightly convex, black-brown and epruinose (without a powdery bloom), and the margin is strongly reduced and cryptolecanorine (largely hidden within the thallus tissue). Internally the hymenium is hyaline and about 120–160 μm high; the epihymenium is brown. The asci are Porpidia-type, each with eight roughly spherical, aseptate, halonate ascospores about (5–)7.5–10(–14) μm in diameter, which are non-amyloid. Pycnidia are frequent (especially on thalli with few apothecia) and open by stellate, winding cracks up to about 0.5 mm long. The conidia are mainly clavate (rarely bacilliform), about 4 × 2 μm. Thin-layer chromatography (TLC) detected 2'-O-methylsuperphyllinic acid (plus traces of an unidentified compound). Chinese specimens assigned to this species were reported to lack detectable secondary metabolites by TLC, and their apothecia were described as non-lobed (in contrast to the round to lobed apothecia often reported from Iranian material).

== Habitat and distribution ==
In Iran, Lecaimmeria iranica is from northern and north-western Iran, including Mazandaran. It was reported from five localities and was considered the most common Iranian species then placed in Immersaria at the time of publication. The lichen grows on exposed rock outcrops in sloping steppe dominated by Astragalus shrubs, and on horizontal to inclined faces of more or less calcareous silicate rock, and seems to be most frequent at relatively humid sites. Reported Iranian collections span roughly 1,450–2,100 m elevation.

Outside Iran, it has been recorded from the Tianshan Mountains near Ürümqi in Xinjiang (China) at about 3,800 m on rock, and has also been reported from Inner Mongolia. The species has also been documented from Armenia. In eastern Kazakhstan (Saur Mountains, south of Zaysan), it was found at about 1,660 m on rain-exposed siliceous rock in a Larix sibirica stand at the tree line adjoining steppe; this record suggests the species may be more widespread across the Inner Asian steppe belt than the original Iranian collections indicated.
