= Hepp =

Hepp is a surname. Notable people with the surname include:

- Alexandre Hepp (1857–1924), French novelist, journalist and drama critic
- Anna Hepp (born 1977), German filmmaker
- David Hepp, American journalist
- Ferenc Hepp (1909–1980), Hungarian basketball administrator
- Johann Adam Philipp Hepp (1797–1867), German physician and lichenologist
- Karl Hepp (1889–1970), German agrarian politician
- Klaus Hepp (born 1936), German-born Swiss physicist
- Leo Hepp (1907–1987), German general

== See also ==
- Hep-Hep riots
- HEP (disambiguation)
- Hebb
