= Immersaria ferruginea =

Scientific classification
- Kingdom: Fungi
- Division: Ascomycota
- Class: Lecanoromycetes
- Order: Lecideales
- Family: Lecideaceae
- Genus: Immersaria
- Species: I. ferruginea

Binomial name
- Immersaria ferruginea C.M.Xie & Li S.Wang (2022)
- Type locality: Quzika Village, Tibet

Species of lichen-forming fungus

Immersaria ferruginea is a species of crustose lichen-forming fungus in the family Lecideaceae. It is a greyish-brown, rock-dwelling lichen with densely crowded, black fruiting bodies, found at alpine elevations of about 3,800–4,300 m in western China. The species was described in 2022 and is named for the rusty-brown tones of its thallus.

== Taxonomy ==
Immersaria ferruginea was described in 2022 by Cong-Miao Xie and Li-Song Wang as part of a revision of the genus Immersaria (family Lecideaceae). The epithet ferruginea refers to the rusty-brown tones of the thallus. The type specimen was collected in Tibet (China), Chamdo, Mangkang County (Quzika Village), at 4,093 m elevation on rock; it is deposited at the Kunming Institute of Botany (KUN).

In the authors' multi-locus phylogenetic analyses, I. ferruginea formed a distinct, well-supported lineage within Immersaria. It is separated from its close relatives by its characteristically greyish-brown thallus combined with abundant, densely crowded apothecia and a brown epihymenium.

== Description ==
This species is a crustose lichen that grows as a continuous body (thallus) broken into small, tile-like patches (areolate). The patches (areoles) are greyish-brown, usually flat (less often slightly convex), and typically 0.5–1.3 mm across, ranging from rectangular to polygonal in outline. The surface lacks a powdery bloom, but the thallus margin can be lightly frosted (pruinose), and a black border zone (prothallus) may be present but is not sharply defined.

The fruiting bodies (apothecia) are frequent and densely crowded, mostly sunken in the thallus, and about 0.7–1.3 mm wide. Their discs are black, flat, and often frosted. The margin is also frosted and slightly raised, and a brown outer wall (exciple) is sometimes developed. Under the microscope, the spore-bearing layer (hymenium) is colourless and topped by a brown uppermost tissue layer (epihymenium); the tissue beneath (hypothecium) is pale brown. The asci are of the Porpidia-type, and ascospores are reported as rare. When observed, they are simple (undivided), oval (ellipsoid), and surrounded by a clear halo (halonate), measuring about 7.5–10 × 5 μm. No asexual fruiting structures (conidiomata) were observed in the material studied. Spot tests on the thallus are negative (K−, C−), while the inner tissue (medulla) turns violet with iodine. The main secondary metabolite is confluentic acid, often accompanied by 2'-O-methylmicrophyllinic acid.

== Habitat and distribution ==
Immersaria ferruginea is saxicolous, occurring on hard rock substrates including quartz sandstone and granite. It has been collected in alpine settings at about 3,800–4,300 m elevation.

As of its original publication, the species is known only from China, with records from Sichuan Province and the Tibet Autonomous Region.
