= HEP =

HEP or hep may refer to:

== Science and medicine ==
- Hepatitis, a medical condition of the liver
- Hepatoerythropoietic porphyria, a blood disease
- High-energy physics
- Homotopy extension property, a property in algebraic topology
- Humane endpoint, predetermined stopping point in animal welfare practices to minimize animal distress and suffering

== Technology ==
- Head-end power, a method for providing electricity to train carriages
- Heterogeneous Element Processor, the first commercial MIMD computer
- High-efficiency plasma, a type of lamp
- High-explosive plastic, a general-purpose ammunition
- Hotel electric power. electricity generated and used aboard a ship for general purposes
- Hydroelectric power, producing electrical energy through the use of moving water

== Organisations ==
- Hep Records, a jazz record label in Scotland
- Hrvatska elektroprivreda, a Croatian power company
- People's Labor Party, pro-Kurdish political party in Turkey

== Other ==
- HEP (shopping mall)
- Healthy eating pyramid
- High School Equivalency Program
- Housing equity partnership
- Hep, a synonym for hip (slang)
- HEP (Latin: Hierosolyma est perdita or Jerusalem is lost); see cheering
- Human Exemptionalism Paradigm, a concept in environmental sociology

== See also ==
- Hep-Hep riots, a series of antisemitic riots in Germany and neighbouring countries in 1819
- Hepp, a surname
