= Porpidia nadvornikiana =

Scientific classification
- Kingdom: Fungi
- Division: Ascomycota
- Class: Lecanoromycetes
- Order: Lecideales
- Family: Lecideaceae
- Genus: Porpidia
- Species: P. nadvornikiana

Binomial name
- Porpidia nadvornikiana (Vězda) Hertel (1984)

Synonyms
- Haplocarpon nadvornikianum Vězda (1972); Huilia nadvornikiana (Vězda) Hertel (1975)

Species of lichen

Porpidia nadvornikiana is a rare species of saxicolous (rock-dwelling), crustose lichen in the family Lecideaceae. It is known to occur only in two localities, in the Czech Republic and in Spain, where it grows on serpentinite, an ultramafic rock.

== Taxonomy ==
It was first formally described as a new species in 1972 by the Czech lichenologist Antonín Vězda, who initially classified it in the genus Haplocarpon. The type specimen was collected by the author on 20 September 1970, in Czechoslovakia. The specific location of the collection was in Bohemia, within the eastern Sudeten Mountains, in the Šumperk District. This lichen was found growing on serpentine rocks known locally as "Vysoký kámen", situated above the village of Raškov. Hannes Hertel proposed to transfer the taxon to the genus Huilia in 1975. In 1984, Hertel transferred it to genus Porpidia.

A second locality of the lichen was reported in 1999, after it was discovered in sierra del Careón (Galicia, Spain), growing on serpentinized peridotites that are part of the Melide geological complex. Until the discovery of the South African species Scoliciosporum fabisporum, it was thought to be the only lichen species known to be restricted to serpentinite as a substrate.

== Description ==
The thallus of the Porpidia nadvornikiana typically presents a whitish-grey to ash-grey colour and is characterised by a cracked (rimose) to a cracked and tiled (rimose-areolate) texture. The algal layer within the thallus is thick, while the internal tissue, or medulla, is very loosely structured. The surface of the thallus is partially adorned with papillate isidia, which are small, finger-like protrusions that are about 0.1 mm wide and 1 mm tall. These protrusions contain a web-like (arachnoid) medulla and sometimes open up, releasing their contents and leaving behind a circular scar upon their removal.

The apothecia (fruiting bodies) of Porpidia nadvornikiana are distinguished by their black colour and sizes ranging from 0.8 to 0.9 mm in diameter. These structures are rounded, closely attached (adnate) to the thallus, flat, and have a persistent edge or margin. They are also slightly dusted with a whitish, powdery substance (pruina). The epithecium, or the upper layer of cells in the apothecia, has a greenish-brown colour. The hymenium, the tissue layer containing the fungal spore-producing structures, measures between 95 and 110 mm and features paraphyses (structural filaments) that are branched and interconnected (anastomosed).

The asci (spore-producing sacs) are club-shaped (claviform) and align with the Porpidia-type, measuring between 81 and 92 by 20 to 23 micrometres (μm). The spores produced are typically eight per ascus, colourless, single-celled, and ellipsoid in shape, with dimensions ranging from 17 to 22 μm in length and 7 to 10 μm in width.

In terms of chemical properties, the medulla of Porpidia nadvornikiana reacts positively to potassium hydroxide solution (K+), turning yellow, and to para-phenylenediamine (PD+), turning orange. Thin-layer chromatography analysis shows the presence of stictic acid and related secondary metabolites.
