= Porpidia seakensis =

Scientific classification
- Kingdom: Fungi
- Division: Ascomycota
- Class: Lecanoromycetes
- Order: Lecideales
- Family: Lecideaceae
- Genus: Porpidia
- Species: P. seakensis

Binomial name
- Porpidia seakensis Fryday (2020)

Species of lichen

Porpidia seakensis is a species of crustose lichen in the family Lecideaceae. It is an endolithic species, meaning it grows inside the rocks, between the grains. Found only in Alaska, it was formally described as a new species in 2020 by British lichenologist Alan Fryday. The type specimen was collected in the Hoonah-Angoon Census Area, in Glacier Bay National Park. Here it was discovered growing on granitic rock in a woodland. The lichen is only known from this area, although it is locally common. Its preferred habitat is siliceous rocks and boulders in wooded areas that are open and well lit. The specific epithet seakensis uses the letters "seak" to refer to a standard abbreviation for southeast Alaska ("SE AK").

The lichen appears as a thin, whitish stain on the rock surface. It produce lecideine apothecia that are typically 0.4–0.8 mm across with a reddish-brown disc. The hypothecium (an area of hyaline to pigmented tissue below the hymenium) measures 100 μm thick and is dark brown. The asci are cylindrical to somewhat club-shaped, measuring 80–95 by 15–20 μm. They produce ascospores that are ellipsoid, hyaline, unornamented, with dimensions ranging between 17.0–24.0 by 2.3–9.2 μm. Porpidia seakensis contains the secondary compound stictic acid. In terms of positive standard spot test reactions, the thallus turns yellow with the application of potassium hydroxide solution (K+), and orange with an ethanolic solution of para-phenylenediamine (PD+).
