= Relicina colombiana =

Scientific classification
- Kingdom: Fungi
- Division: Ascomycota
- Class: Lecanoromycetes
- Order: Lecanorales
- Family: Parmeliaceae
- Genus: Relicina
- Species: R. colombiana

Binomial name
- Relicina colombiana Elix & Sipman (2011)

Species of lichen

Relicina colombiana is a species of saxicolous (rock-dwelling), foliose lichen in the family Parmeliaceae. Found in high-elevation páramo of the Eastern Cordillera in Colombia, it was described as new to science in 2011.

== Taxonomy ==
Relicina colombiana was described by lichenologists John Elix and Harrie Sipman as a new species in 2011. The species name refers to its geographical distribution in Colombia. The type specimen was collected in Bogotá, Páramo de Chisacá, at 3,700 m (12,100 ft) above sea level on rock outcrops in an Espeletia vegetation area.

== Description ==
The thallus of Relicina colombiana is small and foliose, ranging from 1–3.5 cm (0.4–1.4 in) wide. It is tightly attached to its substrate, with individual lobes either separate or occasionally overlapping. The lobes are linear-elongate, 0.2–1.0 mm wide, and dichotomously branched with marginal, sublinear lobules. Bulbate cilia are conspicuous, forming a dense marginal fringe and are often forked and black. The upper surface is pale yellow-green, smooth to rugulose, and immaculate, without isidia. The medulla is white, and the lower surface is black with sparse rhizines. Apothecia are not observed, but pycnidia are common and immersed with a punctiform (dot-like) ostiole. Conidia are bacilliform, measuring approximately 3 by 1 μm. The secondary chemistry of the species includes a range of lichen products, such as usnic acid (major), norstictic acid (major), stictic acid (submajor), constictic acid (minor), salazinic acid (trace), cryptostictic acid (trace), peristictic acid (trace), and connorstictic acid (trace).

=== Similar species ===
In terms of overall morphology and chemistry, Relicina colombiana is similar to Relicina subabstrusa. However, it can be distinguished by its smaller thallus (1–3.5 cm wide) with narrower lobes (0.2–1.0 mm wide) and the presence of dense marginal lobules. Additionally, it contains medullary stictic and constictic acids in substantial amounts, whereas R. subabstrusa contains only norstictic and connorstictic acids in the medulla. While R. subabstrusa is widely distributed in northeastern Australia, Southeast Asia, South America, and the Indian Ocean, and grows on the trunks and branches of trees across various habitats, R. colombiana is limited to quartzitic rock in the paramo zone of the Eastern Cordillera of Colombia.

== Habitat and distribution ==
Relicina colombiana is restricted to saxicolous substrates in the páramo of the Eastern Cordillera of Colombia, at elevations between 3,700 and 4,315 m (12,139 and 14,157 ft).
