= Porpidia pachythallina =

Scientific classification
- Kingdom: Fungi
- Division: Ascomycota
- Class: Lecanoromycetes
- Order: Lecideales
- Family: Lecideaceae
- Genus: Porpidia
- Species: P. pachythallina

Binomial name
- Porpidia pachythallina Fryday (2005)

Species of lichen-forming fungus

Porpidia pachythallina is a species of rock-dwelling, crustose lichen-forming fungus in the family Lecideaceae. Found in Great Britain, it was described as a new species in 2005 by Alan Fryday. The type specimen (holotype) was collected in Scotland (United Kingdom), in Mid Perthshire (vice-county 88) within Ben Lawers National Nature Reserve, at Burn of Edramucky. It was found growing on an acidic mica-schist boulder.
