= Porpidia striata =

Scientific classification
- Kingdom: Fungi
- Division: Ascomycota
- Class: Lecanoromycetes
- Order: Lecideales
- Family: Lecideaceae
- Genus: Porpidia
- Species: P. striata

Binomial name
- Porpidia striata Fryday (2005)

Species of lichen-forming fungus

Porpidia striata is a species of crustose lichen-forming fungus in the family Lecideaceae. Found in Great Britain, it was described as a new species in 2005 by Alan Fryday. The holotype was collected by Fryday on 24 March 1991 in Scotland—specifically Caledonia (V.C. 88), Mid Perthshire, Meall nan Subh. It was gathered from schistose stone embedded in montane heath.
