= Porpidia submelinodes =

Scientific classification
- Kingdom: Fungi
- Division: Ascomycota
- Class: Lecanoromycetes
- Order: Lecideales
- Family: Lecideaceae
- Genus: Porpidia
- Species: P. submelinodes

Binomial name
- Porpidia submelinodes Osyczka & Olech (2011)
- Holotype: Deacon Peak on Penguin Island, Antarctica

Species of lichen

Porpidia submelinodes is a species of saxicolous (rock-dwelling), crustose lichen in the family Lecideaceae. It was described in 2011 from specimens collected in maritime Antarctica, making it the third known Porpidia species endemic to the region. The lichen forms a bright orange to rusty-coloured crust that breaks into rounded, convex chunks separated by deep cracks, giving it a distinctive cobblestone appearance on volcanic rocks. It is found only in the South Shetland and South Orkney Islands, where it grows on exposed ridges and hilltops 30–75 metres above sea level in dry, windy conditions.

== Taxonomy ==
Porpidia submelinodes was described in 2011 by the Polish lichenologists Piotr Osyczka and Maria Olech on the basis of several sterile specimens collected in maritime Antarctica. It is the third endemic Porpidia known from the region, joining P. austroshetlandica and P. skottsbergiana. All material lacks apothecia (fruiting bodies), yet the authors placed the species provisionally in Porpidia because its areolate crust and lecideoid anatomy match the genus better than any alternative.

Morphologically the new taxon resembles the Northern-Hemisphere alpine species P. melinodes; both belong to the P. speirea species group. However, P. submelinodes differs in having distinctly convex, orange-rusty areoles that are clearly separated by deep fissures, an inconspicuous black prothallus and—most significantly—no detectable secondary metabolites, whereas members of the speirea group usually contain confluentic acid derivatives.

== Description ==
The thallus forms a thin to moderately thick (0.2–0.5 mm) crust on siliceous rocks. It is bright orange to rusty in colour and breaks into rounded, firmly convex areoles 0.2–0.8 (rarely as much as 1.2) mm across; these areoles are well-separated by deep fissures up to 0.1 mm wide, giving the crust a cobblestone appearance. A narrow black prothallus is usually visible only where the lichen meets bare rock or neighbouring species. Numerous soralia develop on the tops of the areoles; each soralium is 0.2–0.7 mm wide, ringed by a pale rim and filled with coarse, blackish soredia 20–35 μm in diameter that turn purple in nitric acid (N+ purple). The photobiont is a green algal chlorococcoid) with comparatively large cells, typically 6–10 × 8–12 μm.

No apothecia or pycnidia have been observed to occur in P. submelinodes, so all known reproduction is vegetative. Standard spot tests are negative (K−, C−, KC−, Pd−) and thin-layer chromatography detected no lichen substances. The medulla is non-amyloid (I−), agreeing with other orange-thallus members of the genus.

== Habitat and distribution ==
Porpidia submelinodes is restricted to maritime Antarctica, where it has been documented at two island groups. In the South Shetland Islands it occurs on Penguin Island and the Upłaz massif of King George Island, colonising lava and other volcanic stones on gently sloping hills 30–60 m above sea level. In the South Orkney Islands it has been found on quartz–tremolite boulders around 75 m elevation on Signy Island.

The lichen favours dry, exposed microhabitats on inland ridges and hilltops, often sharing the rock surface with other pioneer crusts such as Lecanora polytropa, Carbonea assentiens and Tremolecia atrata. Known populations appear stable but geographically isolated; no records exist outside the South Shetlands and South Orkneys.

== Species interactions ==
Zwackhiomyces martinatianus is a lichenicolous fungus that has been recorded growing on Porpidia submelinodes.
