= Myelorrhiza =

Scientific classification
- Kingdom: Fungi
- Division: Ascomycota
- Class: Lecanoromycetes
- Order: Lecanorales
- Family: Ramalinaceae
- Genus: Myelorrhiza; Verdon & Elix (1986)

Type species
- Myelorrhiza antrea Verdon & Elix (1986)

Species
- M. antrea M. jenjiana

Genus of lichens

Myelorrhiza is a genus of two Australian species of lichen-forming fungi in the family Ramalinaceae. These lichens form leaf-like growths with narrow, overlapping lobes that attach to their substrate using root-like strands called rhizines. They are found in tropical rainforests of northern Queensland, where they grow on tree bark and rocks. The genus was initially thought to belong to the family Cladoniaceae, but molecular studies placed it outside Cladoniaceae and aligned it with ramalinoid lineages; it is now treated in Ramalinaceae.

== Taxonomy ==
The genus was circumscribed in 1986 by the Australian lichenologists Doug Verdon and John Elix. The genus name is from the Ancient Greek myelos ('pith, medulla') and rhiza ('root'), referring to the genus's rhizines, which, because there is no lower cortex, arise directly from the medullary hyphae. Myelorrhiza was originally classified in the family Cladoniaceae until Sonja Kistenich and colleagues, using molecular phylogenetics analysis, showed that it is more appropriately placed with the Ramalinaceae. Earlier molecular work by Soili Stenroos and colleagues demonstrated that Myelorrhiza does not belong to the Cladoniaceae but instead falls outside Cladoniaceae, in a clade sister to Sphaerophoraceae and grouping with Bacidia/Toninia (Bacidiaceae/Biatoraceae sensu Tehler 1996), i.e., apart from Cladonia and Gymnoderma. Their genetic analysis placed Myelorrhiza as sister to Sphaerophoraceae rather than within Cladoniaceae, contradicting earlier morphology-based assumptions by Verdon and Elix. A broader, five-locus family phylogeny later recovered Myelorrhiza outside the Cladoniaceae and proximate to bacidioid and ramalinoid lineages; the authors note, however, that they lacked new Myelorrhiza sequences and did not sample the type species; the position remains provisional.

Myelorrhiza shares some similarities with Gymnoderma, but differs in having rhizines and in producing apothecia on the upper surface. The structure and development of its apothecia also set it apart.

== Description ==
Myelorrhiza has a foliose (leaf-like) thallus divided into many narrow lobes that often overlap like roof shingles, with deep indentations between them. The upper surface is pale grey to green and has a thin protective skin (a cortex) made of gelatinised, interwoven fungal threads (hyphae). The lower surface lacks a cortex and is whitish-brown. Inside, the thallus contains a loose, cottony layer (the medulla) of very thick-walled hyphae. The lobe tips curve backwards, conspicuously so when the thallus is producing fruiting bodies. Vegetative propagules are absent: there are no soredia (powdery dispersal granules) or isidia (tiny outgrowths). The thallus anchors to the substrate with simple root-like strands (rhizines), which may occur singly or bundled, and range from pale to brown; a felt-like mat of hyphae may also be present beneath the thallus.

The photosynthetic partner (phycobiont) is a Trebouxia-type green alga. The algal cells are often dusted with fine brown granules. Fruiting bodies are common and take the form of apothecia that sit on the upper surface (laminal) and are very short-stalked. They are lecideine in form, meaning their rim is made only of fungal tissue rather than thallus tissue. The disc is strongly convex, can bud to form secondary discs, and is brown when young but tends to blacken with age; the surrounding rim (exciple) is typically darker than the disc. The sexual spores (ascospores) are single-celled and oval to narrowly oval; under the microscope they may seem to have a cross-wall, but the septum is artefactual and disappears when mounted in potassium hydroxide solution (KOH). Asexual structures are immersed pycnidia whose tiny nipple-like tips protrude at the surface; these produce rod-shaped conidia.

== Habitat and distribution ==
Both species of Myelorrhiza are found only in tropical north Queensland, Australia, where they occupy different habitats. The type species, M. antrea, grows on rock surfaces, specifically on the walls of caves and cave-like cavities on Bishop Peak in the Cardwell Range. The second species, M. jenjiana, grows on tree bark in rainforests of the Windsor Tablelands, Walter Hill Range, and Lannercost State Forest.
