= Porpidia hypostictica =

Scientific classification
- Kingdom: Fungi
- Division: Ascomycota
- Class: Lecanoromycetes
- Order: Lecideales
- Family: Lecideaceae
- Genus: Porpidia
- Species: P. hypostictica

Binomial name
- Porpidia hypostictica L.Hu & Z.T.Zhao (2015)

Species of lichen

Porpidia hypostictica is a species of saxicolous (rock-dwelling) crustose lichen in the family Lecideaceae. Found in Jilin, Northeast China, it was described as a new species in 2015. It is characterised by its white to grey-white thallus with yellow, oxidized patches near the edges. It contains hypostictic acid as the only major secondary metabolite; its species epithet refers to this lichen product.
