= Spinasteron ramboldi =

Scientific classification
- Kingdom: Animalia
- Phylum: Arthropoda
- Subphylum: Chelicerata
- Class: Arachnida
- Order: Araneae
- Infraorder: Araneomorphae
- Family: Zodariidae
- Genus: Spinasteron
- Species: S. ramboldi

Binomial name
- Spinasteron ramboldi Baehr & Churchill, 2003
- Holotype: Daly River, Northern Territory, Australia

Species of spider

Spinasteron ramboldi is a species of zodariid spider in the family Zodariidae. The species was described in 2003 from specimens collected in pitfall traps in tropical savanna near Daly River, Northern Territory. Males are small, about 5 millimetres long, with a distinctive pattern of white patches and chevron-shaped markings on a dark brown abdomen. The species is named after German lichenologist Gerhard Rambold, who helped the describing authors with software used in their taxonomic work.

== Taxonomy ==
Spinasteron ramboldi was described as a new species in 2003 by Barbara Baehr and Tracey Churchill during their revision of the endemic Australian zodariid genus Spinasteron, part of the Asteron-complex within the family Zodariidae. The species is based on male material collected in pitfall traps in tropical savanna near the Daly River in the Northern Territory; the holotype male comes from a Parks and Wildlife Commission survey quadrat (M4), and is held in the Museum and Art Gallery of the Northern Territory (specimen NTM A489). The species is named to honour Gerhard Rambold.

Using morphological data, Baehr and Churchill placed S. ramboldi in the Spinasteron ramboldi species-group, defined mainly by details of the male copulatory organ. In their cladistic analysis S. ramboldi is sister to a clade containing S. spatulanum and S. kronestedti and another containing S. westi and S. casuarium. The species epithet honours the German lichenologist Gerhard Rambold, who assisted the authors by introducing them to the DELTA software used to generate the diagnostic descriptions and identification key.

== Description ==
Spinasteron ramboldi is a small zodariid spider, with males about 5 mm in total length. The carapace is orange-brown, slightly longer than wide and highest just behind the posterior median eyes, while the sternum is paler brown. The chelicerae are medium brown and the maxillae and labium are medium brown with contrasting white tips. The abdomen is deep sepia brown and bears a characteristic pattern: three pairs of white patches on the front part of the dorsum and a further three pale spots in front of the spinnerets, overlaid with pale chevron-shaped markings. The legs are pale brown, with white coxae and trochanters; the femora are mostly pale but darken towards the tips, and the first femur has an additional darker patch near the base.

The eyes are arranged in three rows (2–4–2) and, as in other Spinasteron species, the anterior median eyes are the largest and the anterior lateral eyes the smallest. Only males are known. The male palp is distinctive and provides the main characters used to recognise the species. On the outer side of the tegulum, the distal apophysis ends in a long, scythe-shaped tip with a large, flattened prong beside it, and the broad basal part of the embolus is flattened and slightly hollowed. These palpal features, together with the abdominal colour pattern, separate S. ramboldi from other species in the genus.

== Habitat and distribution ==
Spinasteron ramboldi is known only from the Daly River region of the Northern Territory, in the Arnhemian biogeographic subregion of northern Australia. All recorded specimens were taken in pitfall traps set in tropical savanna in that area, and, as of its original publication, had not yet been reported from any other locality.
