= Doug Verdon =

Australian horticulturist and lichenologist

Douglas "Doug" Verdon (13 February 1920 – 31 July 2000) was a British‑born Australian horticulturist and lichenologist whose work expanded knowledge of the genus Leptogium and other Australasian lichens. Best known for his long association with the Australian National Botanic Gardens and his post‑retirement research at the Australian National University, he published new species, co‑described a new genus, and mentored many colleagues in cryptogamic botany. Several lichen taxa have been named in his honour.

== Biography ==
Verdon was born in Wallasey, near Liverpool, and spent most of his childhood in the National Children's Home on the Isle of Man, leaving at fourteen to labour during the Great Depression before a brief period living rough in London. He enlisted in the Royal Air Force as a fitter and served for eleven years, seeing wartime duty in the Middle East, North, East and South Africa, and Italy, where an exchange of deliberately inaccurate fire with a German Heinkel left neither side harmed. After the war he married Eileen, and a short experiment with farming in Shropshire preceded the family's migration to Australia in 1958. Initially employed in a Pialligo market garden, he joined the Government Nursery at Yarralumla in 1962, studied horticulture at Canberra Institute of Technology, and soon moved into the new Horticultural Research Unit.

In 1968 Verdon transferred to the herbarium of the Canberra Botanic Gardens (later the Australian National Botanic Gardens), where he identified thousands of specimens from major Western Australian expeditions and developed a flair for taxonomic work. His horticultural achievements included producing "Doug's Hybrid" or "Canberry Coronet", a showy waratah derived from Telopea speciosissima × T. mongaensis. By the mid‑1970s lichens had become his principal interest, and he spent the last part of his paid career focusing on their taxonomy, retiring from the Gardens in 1985. He then accepted a position in the department of chemistry at the Australian National University, collaborating with professor Jack Elix from 1986 until 1998 and working actively until the age of seventy‑eight.

Verdon's research centred on the complex Australasian members of the genus Leptogium, leading to the description of several new species in 1990 and the preparation of the genus treatment for the 1992 Flora of Australia lichen volume. With Elix he also erected the new genus Myelorrhiza in the Cladoniaceae and described additional species in Physma and Solenopsora with Gerhard Rambold. His lichen collections, gathered widely across eastern Australia, are housed in the Australian National Herbarium and continue to underpin current studies. Even after retirement he travelled to European institutions in Berlin, Paris, London, Copenhagen and Uppsala to examine historical lichen material, further refining Australian taxonomy.

== Legacy and impact ==
Colleagues remembered Verdon for his dry humour, generosity, and willingness to assist with everything from Latin translations to microscopic investigations of obscure ascal structures. His approachable manner and strong sense of fairness won him respect within the botanical community and beyond, leading one outback acquaintance to call him "a real wacker", high praise for an immigrant from the Isle of Man. Verdon's publications, herbarium specimens and mentorship laid a foundation for subsequent Australian lichenology, influencing researchers such as Simone Louwhoff and Jen Johnston who continued work on groups he helped define. Survived by his wife Eileen, a daughter and a son, he left a lasting imprint on both horticulture and cryptogamic botany in Australia.

Several lichen taxa have been named in honour of Verdon: Cratiria verdonii Elix (2014), Heterodermia verdonii Elix (2011), Lecanora pseudogangaleoides subsp. verdonii Lumbsch (1995), Pertusaria verdonii A.W.Archer (1992), Physcia verdonii Elix (2011), and Xanthoparmelia verdonii Elix & J.Johnst. (1986).
