= Spinasteron =

Scientific classification
- Domain: Eukaryota
- Kingdom: Animalia
- Phylum: Arthropoda
- Subphylum: Chelicerata
- Class: Arachnida
- Order: Araneae
- Infraorder: Araneomorphae
- Family: Zodariidae
- Genus: Spinasteron; Baehr

Type species
- Spinasteron nigriceps

Species
- 19, see text

Genus of spiders

Spinasteron is a genus of spiders in the family Zodariidae. It was first described in 2003 by Baehr. As of 2017, it contains 19 Australian species.

== Species ==
Spinasteron comprises the following species:

- Spinasteron arenarium Baehr, 2003
- Spinasteron barlee Baehr, 2003
- Spinasteron casuarium Baehr, 2003
- Spinasteron cavasteroides Baehr & Churchill, 2003
- Spinasteron knowlesi Baehr, 2003
- Spinasteron kronestedti Baehr, 2003
- Spinasteron lemleyi Baehr, 2003
- Spinasteron longbottomi Baehr, 2003
- Spinasteron ludwigi Baehr & Churchill, 2003
- Spinasteron mjobergi Baehr, 2003
- Spinasteron nigriceps Baehr, 2003
- Spinasteron peron Baehr, 2003
- Spinasteron ramboldi Baehr & Churchill, 2003
- Spinasteron sanford Baehr, 2003
- Spinasteron spatulanum Baehr & Churchill, 2003
- Spinasteron waldockae Baehr, 2003
- Spinasteron weiri Baehr, 2003
- Spinasteron westi Baehr, 2003
- Spinasteron woodstock Baehr, 2003
