= Johannes-Günther Knoph =

German lichenologist (1951–2019)

- Born: November 8, 1951; Breitsamet, Gerolsbach, Upper Bavaria, West Germany
- Died: January 29, 2019 (aged 67); Berlin, Germany
- Education: LMU Munich; Free University of Berlin
- Known for: Chemotaxonomy of lecideoid lichens; monographic studies of Lecidella
- Scientific career
- Fields: Lichenology, mycology, botany
- Workplaces: LMU Munich; Free University of Berlin; University of Jena
- Thesis: (1989)
- Doctoral advisor: Christian Leuckert
- Author abbrev. (botany): Knoph

Johannes-Günther Knoph (8 November 1951–29 January 2019) was a German lichenologist whose research focused on the systematics and chemotaxonomy of lecideoid lichens, especially the genus Lecidella. Trained initially as a bank clerk, he later studied biology at LMU Munich and went on to hold research posts at the Free University of Berlin and the University of Jena. Through his collaboration with the chemist Christian Leuckert he became known for combining studies of secondary metabolites with classical taxonomy, producing influential treatments of Lecidella and related genera.

== Life and career ==
Johannes-Günther Knoph was born on 8 November 1951 in the small hamlet of Breitsamet near Gerolsbach in Upper Bavaria, West Germany. He was the youngest of four children, and in 1955 his family moved to Ottobrunn, a growing suburb of Munich. After completing secondary school (Realschule) in Munich in 1969 he trained as a bank clerk with the Bayerische Vereinsbank and then worked briefly in banking. From 1973 to 1976, he was employed as a bookkeeper by the aerospace manufacturer Messerschmitt-Bölkow-Blohm in Ottobrunn. Wanting to study biology, he attended an evening grammar school for working adults in Munich, where he obtained the qualifications needed for university entrance in 1977. He then studied biology at the LMU Munich from 1977 to 1984. There he joined the working group of the lichenologist Hannes Hertel, discovered his interest in lichens, and became regarded as a specialist in lecideoid taxa, a group of crustose lichens with dark, often carbonised fruiting bodies and generally lacking a thalline margin. His botany diploma thesis, completed in 1984, dealt with euthalline species of the lichen genus Porpidia in Europe, which lack a thalline margin, with particular emphasis on the Alpine region.

Following his diploma, Knoph was employed in 1984–1985 as a research assistant at the chair of soil science in the Faculty of Forest Sciences at LMU Munich. In 1985, he moved to the Free University of Berlin, where he worked until 1990 as a scientific assistant at the Institute for Systematic Botany and Plant Geography. Under the supervision of Christian Leuckert he completed his doctorate there in 1989; his dissertation was titled "Untersuchungen an gesteinsbewohnenden xanthonhaltigen Sippen der Flechtengattung Lecidella (Lecanoraceae, Lecanorales) unter besonderer Berücksichtigung von außereuropäischen Proben exklusive Amerika" ('Studies on rock-dwelling xanthone-containing taxa of the lichen genus Lecidella (Lecanoraceae, Lecanorales) with particular consideration of non-European samples excluding America'). Between 1991 and 1995, he remained at the Berlin institute as a postdoctoral researcher funded by the German Research Foundation, continuing chemotaxonomic studies on Lecidella. During the winter semester of 1996–1997, he taught as a lecturer at the University of Jena, and he subsequently worked there as a research scientist in systematic botany until 2001. After this period Knoph had to take early retirement on health grounds, and his later years were marked by serious illness; he lived in Berlin during this time. Knoph died on 29 January 2019.

== Research ==
Knoph's scientific work centred on lecideoid lichens and on applying chemical characters, especially secondary metabolites, to lichen taxonomy. Working closely with Christian Leuckert, who was an authority on lichen chemistry, he became part of a productive partnership that investigated xanthone-containing species of Lecidella and other lecideoid genera. Their studies combined thin-layer chromatography and other chemical methods with detailed morphological and anatomical observations, helping to clarify species limits and infrageneric groupings within Lecidella.

A major outcome of this work was Knoph's 1990 monograph on rock-dwelling, xanthone-containing taxa of Lecidella, which gave particular attention to extra-European material outside the Americas. He later co-authored chemotaxonomic studies on rock-dwelling Lecidella species from the Americas and a chapter on the genus in the Lichen Flora of the Greater Sonoran Desert Region, summarising its taxonomy and chemistry for that flora. Together with Leuckert he also examined the role of secondary compounds as taxonomic characters in Lecidella as part of a Festschrift volume on the phytochemistry and chemotaxonomy of lichen-forming ascomycetes. In addition to his research papers, Knoph edited a Festschrift honouring his mentor Leuckert, published in 1995.
