= Porpidia islandica =

Scientific classification
- Kingdom: Fungi
- Division: Ascomycota
- Class: Lecanoromycetes
- Order: Lecideales
- Family: Lecideaceae
- Genus: Porpidia
- Species: P. islandica

Binomial name
- Porpidia islandica Fryday, Knoph & Hertel (2005)

Species of lichen-forming fungus

Porpidia islandica is a species of crustose lichen-forming fungus in the family Lecideaceae. Found in Iceland and Scotland, it was described as a new to science in 2005. The holotype specimen was collected in Iceland by Hertel on 20 July 1979 (collector's no. 23061). The stated locality is in Austur-Barðastrandarsýsla, at Ólafsdalur, where it was found on rock. The habitat is described as chiefly north-east-facing slopes close to the valley floor above the Lambadalsá stream, including scree slopes and scree-covered terraces.
