= Physcia verdonii =

Scientific classification
- Kingdom: Fungi
- Division: Ascomycota
- Class: Lecanoromycetes
- Order: Caliciales
- Family: Physciaceae
- Genus: Physcia
- Species: P. verdonii

Binomial name
- Physcia verdonii Elix (2011)
- Holotype: Bunga, New South Wales, Australia

Species of lichen

Physcia verdonii is a species of foliose lichen in the family Physciaceae. It occurs in Australia and New Zealand.

== Taxonomy ==
Physcia verdonii was described from specimens collected west of Mimosa Rocks National Park in New South Wales, Australia. It resembles Physcia poncinsii but differs in its darker lower surface and unique chemical profile. Named and described by John Elix in 2011, the lichen's species epithet honours his colleague Doug Verdon (1920–2000).

== Description ==
The Physcia verdonii thallus is typically orbicular, spreading up to 6 cm wide, and firmly attached to the substrate. The lobes are narrow, ranging from 0.3 to 1.5 mm wide, with entire to delicately notched margins. The upper surface is light to dark grey, often with a grey-white frost-like appearance at the tips and is devoid of reproductive soredia along the margins. Instead, soralia are present on the lamina, typically crater-like with flaring margins, containing coarse greenish white to white granular soredia. The lower surface ranges from pale to mid-brown at the margins to grey-brown or dark brown centrally. Rhizines are simple to squarrose-branched and vary in colour from whitish to brown, helping to anchor the lichen to its substrate.

== Habitat and distribution ==
Physcia verdonii is found on coastal rocks in southeastern Australia and New Zealand. It prefers sun-exposed granite rocks in coastal environments but can also be found on bark and among mosses.

== Chemistry ==
Chemical spot tests on the cortex and medulla are positive with potassium hydroxide solution (K+ yellow), indicating the presence of atranorin and zeorin among other triterpenes which contribute to its chemical makeup.
