= Porpidia circumnigrata =

Scientific classification
- Kingdom: Fungi
- Division: Ascomycota
- Class: Lecanoromycetes
- Order: Lecideales
- Family: Lecideaceae
- Genus: Porpidia
- Species: P. circumnigrata

Binomial name
- Porpidia circumnigrata (Vežda) Knežević & Mayrhofer, 2008

Synonyms
- Huilia circumnigrata Vežda, 1979

Species of lichen

Porpidia circumnigrata is a species of crustose lichen in the family Lecideaceae found Montenegro.

== Taxonomy ==
The lichen was first formally described in 1979 by the Czech lichenologist Antonín Vězda, who placed it in the genus Huilia as Huilia circumnigrata. However, in 2008, researchers Knežević and Mayrhofer transferred it to the genus Porpidia, based on modern taxonomic analysis.

== Description ==
The thallus of Porpidia circumnigrata is crustose, forming a thin, continuous crust tightly attached to the substrate. It is typically greyish-white in colour.

The reproductive structures, or apothecia (fruiting bodies), are common. These lecideine apothecia are round, sessile (lacking a stalk), and usually black in colour with a diameter ranging from 0.1 to 0.4 mm.

== Distribution ==
Porpidia circumnigrata is known only from a single locality in Montenegro: above the village of Morinj (Kotor Municipality) at an elevation of approximately 50 meters.

== Habitat ==
The primary habitat is on siliceous rocks, pebbles, and stonework. It has also been rarely recorded on bark, wood, and compacted soil.
