= Immersaria aurantia =

Scientific classification
- Kingdom: Fungi
- Division: Ascomycota
- Class: Lecanoromycetes
- Order: Lecideales
- Family: Lecideaceae
- Genus: Immersaria
- Species: I. aurantia

Binomial name
- Immersaria aurantia C.M.Xie & Li S.Wang (2022)
- Type locality: Mula Village, Tibet

Species of lichen-forming fungus

Immersaria aurantia is a species of crustose lichen-forming fungus in the family Lecideaceae. It is an orange, rock-dwelling lichen found at alpine elevations above 3,900 m in western China, including Tibet, Qinghai, and Sichuan. The species was described in 2022 and is distinguished by its bright orange surface patches and a predominantly green upper tissue layer in the fruiting bodies.

== Taxonomy ==
Immersaria aurantia was described as a new species in 2022 by Cong-Miao Xie and Li-Song Wang during a revision of the genus Immersaria (family Lecideaceae). The species name refers to the orange colour of the thallus. The type material was collected in Tibet (China), near Sa'gya County, Mula Village, at 4,752 m elevation, growing on rock. The holotype is housed at the Kunming Institute of Botany (KUN).

In that revision, multi-locus phylogenetic analyses supported I. aurantia as a distinct lineage within Immersaria. It is set apart from related species by the combination of an irregular, orange areolate thallus and a mostly green epihymenium (the pigmented upper layer of the spore-bearing tissue). It resembles I. athroocarpa, but has more regularly polygonal, convex areoles and more densely crowded apothecia, while I. venusta tends to have yellow-brown to rusty, cracked areoles and flatter apothecia; the chemistry also differs, as I. venusta consistently has both confluentic and planaic acids together, whereas I. aurantia does not.

== Description ==
The lichen forms a crust on rock, with the thallus divided into flat, irregular "tiles" (areoles) that are typically 0.7–1.3 mm across. Colour ranges from bright orange through darker orange to paler orange and, in some thalli, a duller red-brown tone. The areoles are epruinose (not dusted with a powdery bloom), but the thin thallus margin may be lightly pruinose; a prothallus is not evident. In cross section, the outer skin (upper cortex) is orange and about 25–45 micrometres (μm) thick, with an uneven uneven clear dead layer epinecral layer above (often 37–63 μm). The photobiont layer is 50–93 μm thick, with algal cells that are broadly rounded to ellipsoid.

The fruiting bodies (apothecia) are usually frequent and scattered, commonly sunken in the thallus (sometimes appearing slightly isolated from the areoles), and measure about 0.3–1.3 mm in diameter. The disc is black, flat to concave, and may sometimes be froste (pruinose). The margin is reduced and an outer wall (exciple) may be weakly developed (around 30 μm wide) and brown. The hymenium is colourless (about 55–83 μm tall), topped by a green to green-brown epihymenium (about 20 μm), with a brown hypothecium. Asci are of the Porpidia-type and contain eight spores. The ascospores are simple (undivided), ellipsoid, and halonate, measuring about 8–15 × 5–7.5 μm. Asexual structures (pycnidia) are uncommon. When present they are immersed and dark, producing rod-shaped (bacilliform) conidia about 7.5 × 1.0 μm. Standard spot tests are negative on the thallus (K−, C−), while the medulla turns violet with iodine. Three chemical profiles were reported: confluentic acid (often with 2'-O-methylmicrophyllinic acid), planaic acid, or (rarely) no detectable lichen products.

== Habitat and distribution ==
Immersaria aurantia is a saxicolous species (rock-dwelling) recorded from high-elevation alpine habitats in China. Collections come from roughly 3,900–4,300 m, with the type locality higher (4,752 m), consistent with an affinity for exposed montane or plateau rock in cold, open environments.

It is known only from China, with records from Qinghai and Sichuan provinces and the Tibet Autonomous Region.
