= Relicina subcoronata =

Scientific classification
- Kingdom: Fungi
- Division: Ascomycota
- Class: Lecanoromycetes
- Order: Lecanorales
- Family: Parmeliaceae
- Genus: Relicina
- Species: R. subcoronata

Binomial name
- Relicina subcoronata Elix & J.Johnst. (1990)

Species of lichen-forming fungus

Relicina subcoronata is a species of foliose lichen-forming fungus in the family Parmeliaceae. It is a small, yellow-green, bark-dwelling lichen described in 1990 and known only from a single locality in the hinterland of northern Queensland, Australia. It is closely similar to Relicina limbata but is distinguished by its more tightly attached thallus and by the partial frilly collar on its fruiting bodies.

== Taxonomy ==
Relicina subcoronata was described as a new species by John Alan Elix and Jen Johnston in 1990, based on a holotype collected in Queensland, Australia, and now maintained at the National Herbarium of Victoria (MEL). The authors noted that it is closely similar to Relicina limbata in overall morphology and chemistry, but differs in having a more tightly attached body (thallus) with lobes that sit closely side by side (contiguous lobes), and in the structure of its fruiting bodies (apothecia), which bear a partial frilly collar (subcoronate) rather than lacking one entirely (ecoronate).

== Description ==
The lichen body (thallus) is leafy (foliose) and grows closely attached to bark, yellow-green in life (becoming yellow-brown in dried specimens), and up to about 5 cm across. The lobes are narrow and elongated, sitting closely side by side, and fork in roughly equal pairs (subdichotomously branched). The margins bear short, hair-like projections (cilia, to about 0.3 mm long) with distinctively swollen (bulbate) bases, moderately to sparsely developed. The upper surface is flat to slightly convex and may become cracked with age. It is faintly mottled (weakly maculate) and lacks both soredia and isidia (vegetative reproductive structures). The inner tissue (medulla) is white. The lower surface is brown to dark brown, densely covered with brown to black root-like anchoring threads (rhizines) that are usually unbranched but can fork in pairs.

Apothecia are common, attached, and about 1–3 mm in diameter, with a cinnamon-brown disc that is flat to shallowly concave and a subcoronate margin. The outer surface of the fruiting body (the amphithecium) may bear downward-pointing root-like threads (retrorsely rhizinate). The species has simple, colourless, ellipsoid ascospores (about 7–9 × 3.5–4.5 μm). Pycnidia are common and punctiform (point-like), producing bifusiform conidia (about 6–8 × 1 μm). In terms of chemical spot test reactions, the cortex is K−, while the medulla is K+ (yellow-red), C−, and PD+ (orange). Reported lichen substances include usnic acid and stictic acid (major), with norstictic and constictic acids (minor) and several trace compounds including cryptostictic and hypostictic acids, and atranorin.

== Habitat and distribution ==
Relicina subcoronata is considered very rare and has not been recorded beyond its type locality in the hinterland of northern Queensland, Australia, where it grows on bark. The type was collected in dry open country, on an isolated tree on a ridge of conglomerate, about 30 m from Broken River and roughly 224 km north-west of Charters Towers, Queensland.
