= Relicina columnaria =

Scientific classification
- Kingdom: Fungi
- Division: Ascomycota
- Class: Lecanoromycetes
- Order: Lecanorales
- Family: Parmeliaceae
- Genus: Relicina
- Species: R. columnaria

Binomial name
- Relicina columnaria Elix & J.Johnst. (1990)

Species of lichen-forming fungus

Relicina columnaria is a species of lichen-forming fungus in the family Parmeliaceae. It is a yellow-green, leafy (foliose) lichen that grows on tree trunks and branches in upper montane rainforest in Sabah (Malaysia) and Papua New Guinea. The species was described in 1990 and is considered relatively rare, occurring at elevations above about 2,500 m.

== Taxonomy ==
Relicina columnaria was described as a new species by John Elix and Jen Johnston in 1990. It was based on a type specimen collected in Papua New Guinea (Central Province, Myola) at 2700 m elevation, growing on a large branch of a felled tree on the top of a ridge. The authors noted that the species is morphologically very similar to R. fluorescens, and that some earlier material had been treated as that species, but they separated R. columnaria on chemical and ecological grounds.

== Description ==
The body (thallus) is leafy (foliose) and leathery, yellow-green, and about 4–7 cm across; it is loosely attached to bark or more closely pressed against it in places. The lobes sit side by side and are narrow (about 2–5 mm wide), overlapping, and forking in roughly equal pairs (dichotomously to subdichotomously branched). The lobe margins bear hair-like projections (cilia) with swollen bases (bulbate) that are moderately to densely developed and only weakly inflated. The upper surface is flat to somewhat wrinkled and finely pitted, faintly mottled (weakly maculate), and lacks soredia and isidia (vegetative reproductive structures). The upper skin layer (cortex) is columnar in structure and about 20–25 μm thick, with a white inner tissue (medulla) beneath. The lower surface is black and densely covered with root-like anchoring threads (rhizines) that range from unbranched to densely and irregularly branched.

Apothecia are common, stalked, and about 1–6 mm in diameter, with a dark brown disc that may be weakly concave to plane or irregularly undulate. The margin lacks a corona and becomes dentate with age, and the amphithecium is sparsely rhizinate. Ascospores are simple, colourless, and subspherical to broadly ellipsoid (about 5–6 × 3.5–4.5 μm). Pycnidia are very common; conidia are bifusiform (about 6–7 × 1 μm). Chemically, the medulla reacts K+ (pale yellow), C+ (pale yellow-orange), and PD+ (yellow) to standard chemical spot tests. It contains usnic acid and an echinocarpic acid complex (echinocarpic acid as a major component and conechinocarpic acid as a minor component), with atranorin reported in trace amounts.

== Habitat and distribution ==
This relatively rare species grows on tree trunks and canopy branches in montane rainforest in Sabah (Malaysia) and Papua New Guinea. In Papua New Guinea it was reported from upper montane forests above about 2500 m elevation, unlike the related R. fluorescens, which was associated with lower montane forests below about 2000 m.
