= Relicina clarkensis =

Scientific classification
- Kingdom: Fungi
- Division: Ascomycota
- Class: Lecanoromycetes
- Order: Lecanorales
- Family: Parmeliaceae
- Genus: Relicina
- Species: R. clarkensis

Binomial name
- Relicina clarkensis Elix & J.Johnst. (1990)

Species of lichen-forming fungus

Relicina clarkensis is a species of foliose lichen-forming fungus in the family Parmeliaceae. It is a small, pale green to yellow-green, rock-dwelling lichen with narrow, forking lobes edged with distinctive black, swollen-based hair-like projections. The species was described in 1990 and is known only from granite rocks in woodland in the Clarke Range of central Queensland, Australia.

== Taxonomy ==
Relicina clarkensis was described as a new species by John Elix and Jen Johnston in 1990, in a paper treating three newly recognized Australasian members of the genus Relicina. The type specimen was collected in Queensland, in the Clarke Range, south of Proserpine. It was found growing on granite rocks at the edge of an escarpment in woodland dominated by Eucalyptus and Casuarina.

== Description ==
The lichen body (thallus) is leafy (foliose) and closely pressed against its rock substrate, pale green to yellow-green, and up to about 3 cm across. The lobes are narrow and elongated, forking in roughly equal pairs (dichotomously divided) and becoming more separated toward the margins. The lobe edges bear black, unbranched hair-like projections (cilia) that are moderately developed and distinctively swollen at the base. The upper surface is flat to slightly convex and faintly mottled (weakly maculate), with older lobes often cracked. Soredia and isidia (vegetative reproductive structures) are absent. The inner tissue (medulla) is white, while the lower surface is pale brown with dense black root-like anchoring threads (rhizines) that are unbranched or only sparsely branched.

Fruiting bodies (apothecia) are common, attached to the thallus, with a dark brown disc and a thin, persistent margin that is weakly toothed and not coronate. Ascospores are simple, colourless, and ellipsoid, and the pycnidia produce bifusiform (spindle-shaped with a pinch in the middle) conidia. Reported spot-test reactions include a K− cortex and a medulla that is K+ (yellow-red) and PD+ (orange). thin-layer and liquid chromatography detected usnic acid in the cortex and a medullary chemistry including stictic acid and menegazziaic acid among the principal lichen substances, with several additional compounds present in smaller amounts.

== Habitat and distribution ==
The species is saxicolous and was reported as having a restricted distribution in central Queensland, Australia, in the Proserpine district. It is known from granite rocks at the type locality in the Clarke Range, where it was collected on the edge of an escarpment in Eucalyptus–Casuarina woodland at about 800 m elevation.
