= Hebb =

Hebb is a surname. Notable people with the surname include:

- Bobby Hebb (1938–2010), American singer-songwriter
- Donald O. Hebb (1904–1985), Canadian psychologist

== See also ==
Hebbian theory in psychology (including Hebb's rule, AKA Hebb's postulate)
