= Porpidia flavicunda =

Conservation status
- Apparently Secure (NatureServe)

Scientific classification
- Kingdom: Fungi
- Division: Ascomycota
- Class: Lecanoromycetes
- Order: Lecideales
- Family: Lecideaceae
- Genus: Porpidia
- Species: P. flavicunda

Binomial name
- Porpidia flavicunda (Ach.) Gowan (1989)

Species of lichen

Porpidia flavicunda is a species of saxicolous (rock-dwelling) crustose lichen in the family Lecideaceae. This bright yellow-orange lichen forms crusty patches on siliceous rocks, bordered by distinctive narrow black lines, and is dotted with small black disc-shaped fruiting bodies. It has a circumpolar distribution across arctic and boreal regions and is among the most common lichens found growing on rocks in Iceland.

== Taxonomy ==
The species was described in 1810 by Erik Acharius as Lecidea flavicunda. Since then it has been reclassified a number of times, even at genus level, having, at one time or another, been placed in the genera Lecidea, Huilia, Biatora, Haplocarpon, Lichen and its current genus, Porpidia.

The species taxonomy was last revised in 1989, when it obtained its current species name, Porpidia flavicunda.

== Description ==
Porpidia flavicunda spreads as a bright yellow-orange crust on siliceous rock, each colony neatly bounded by a narrow, black, felt-like line of fungal threads (the prothallus) that keeps neighbouring thalli apart. The surface is usually even, but a hand lens reveals a mosaic of minute areoles that coalesce into a continuous coating.

Black fruiting discs (apothecia) commonly pepper the thallus, either singly or gathered in small clusters of up to ten. They begin sunk within the thallus but soon sit on top as shallow bowls, later becoming almost level and finally domed. Crowding causes the outlines to turn from round to irregular. A conspicuous, raised rim made purely of fungal tissue (the true exciple) encircles each disc and persists even on old specimens. The disc itself is matt to slightly glossy and often dusted with a fine, whitish bloom; in very mature apothecia the centre may split into wrinkled, sterile islands. Microscopically, the clear hymenium stands 85–150 micrometres (μm) tall beneath a thin, olive-tinged brown cap (epithecium). Supporting layers grade from pale yellow-brown just below the hymenium to a dark reddish-brown base (hypothecium). The asci produce smooth, single-celled ascospores measuring 15–19 × 8.5–10 μm that are released to start new colonies.

Spot-test chemistry shows confluentic acid as the dominant substance in European material; North American populations sometimes contain stictic and/or norstictic acids instead. No other lichen products are consistently reported.

== Habitat and distribution ==
Porpidia flavicunda has a circumpolar arctic and boreal distribution. There are indications P. flavicunda populations frequently spread their propagules to other populations, even on different continents, resulting in low amounts of genetic drift in isolated populations and a higher than expected genetic uniformity between continents.

Porpidia flavicunda is among the most common and widely seen lichens in Iceland where it grows on rocks.
