= Alexandre Hepp =

French novelist, journalist and drama critic (1857–1924)

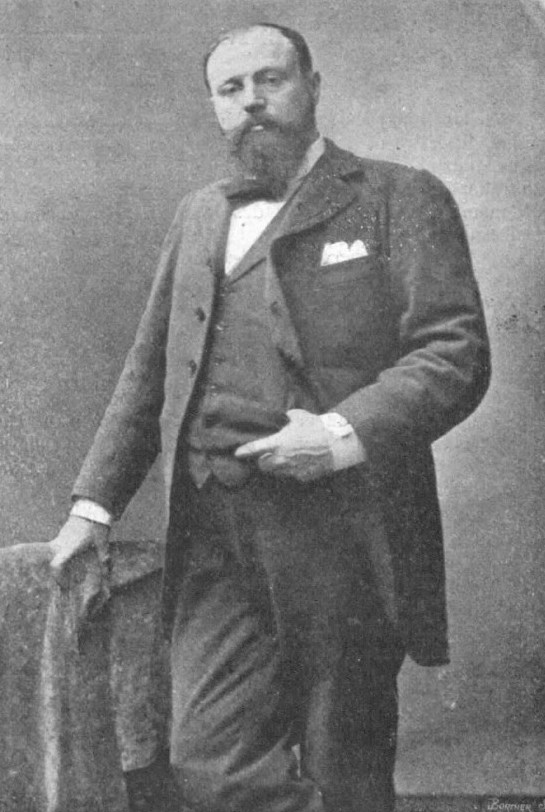
Alexandre Hepp

Alexandre Hepp (14 January 1857 – 1924) was a 19th–20th-century French novelist, journalist and drama critic.

With Henry Céard, Guy de Maupassant, Joris-Karl Huysmans and Paul Alexis, he was one of Émile Zola's disciples. He collaborated with many newspapers including Le Gaulois, L'Événement, L'Écho de Paris, Gil Blas, Le Voltaire, Le Matin and Le Figaro. Many of his columns were collected and published in volume.

== Publications ==
- 1878: Les Errantes, novel
- 1879: Histoire de Ruy-Blas, with Clément Clament
- 1881: Les Étrangleurs de la tour Malakoff
- 1882: L'Amie de Mme Alice
- 1884: Paris patraque
- 1885: Paris tout nu
- 1886: Les Anges parisiens
- 1888: L'Épuisé, novel
- 1890: Chaos, roman contemporain. Also published as feuilleton in Le Figaro from 25 February 1890 to 29 March 1890)
- 1897: Cœurs pharisiens (1897)
- 1898–1899 :Les Quotidiennes (2 volumes, 1898–1899) Text online 1 2
- 1891: Le Lait d'une autre
- 1895: Minutes d'Orient, propos de cour et paysages
- 1901: Cœur d'amant, roman contemporain
- 1901: Ciel de Russie
- 1901: La Coupe empoisonnée
- 1906: L'Audacieux pardon
- 1910: Ferdinand de Bulgarie intime
- 1913: L'Affreuse étreinte, novel
- 1914: La Valise bouclée
- 1916: Les Cœurs embellis, 1914–1915 Text online
- 1917: Les Cœurs armés. 1916
- 1919:Les Cœurs victorieux, 1917–1918
