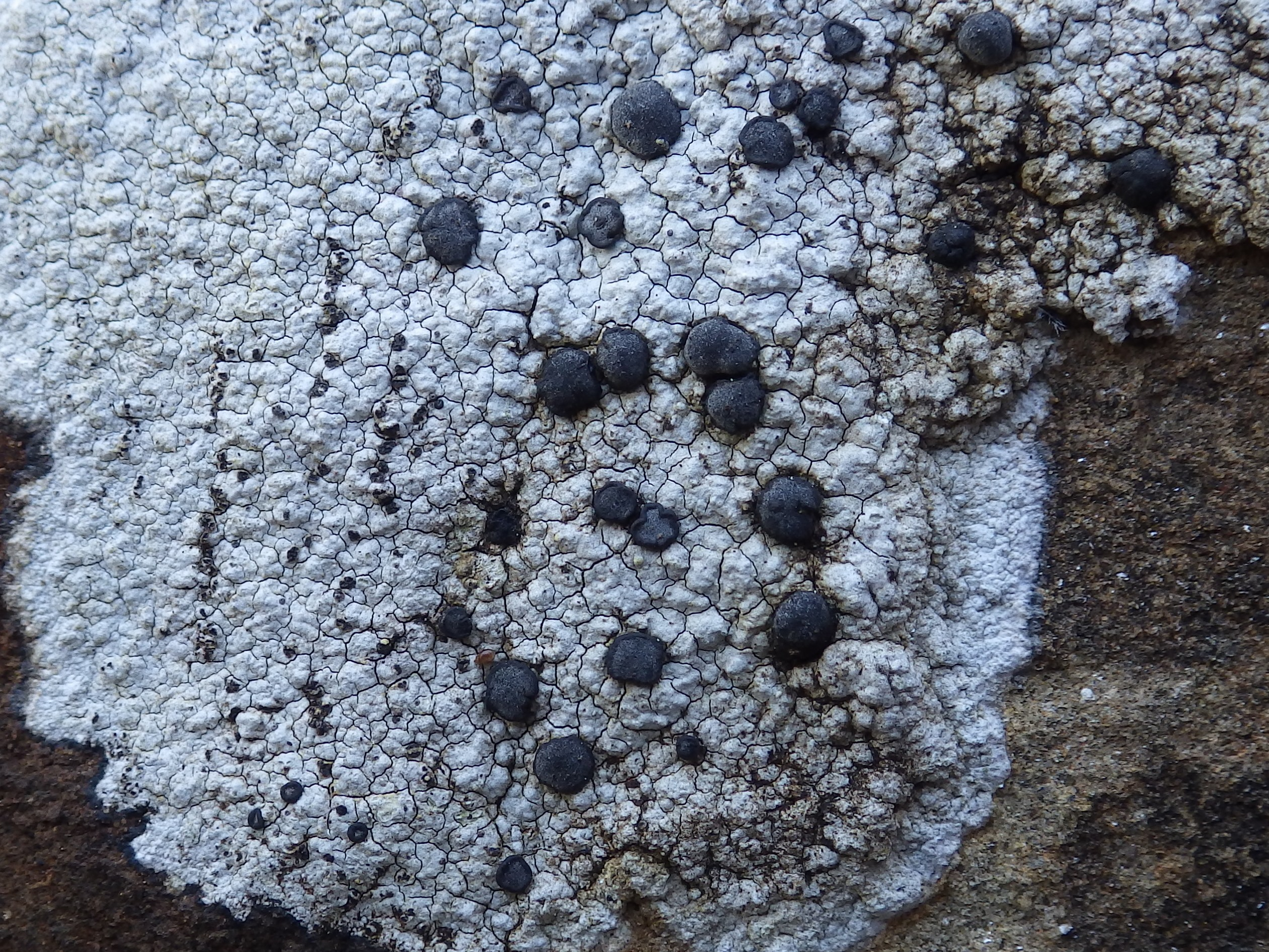

Conservation status
- Apparently Secure (NatureServe)

Scientific classification
- Kingdom: Fungi
- Division: Ascomycota
- Class: Lecanoromycetes
- Order: Lecideales
- Family: Lecideaceae
- Genus: Porpidia
- Species: P. macrocarpa

Binomial name
- Porpidia macrocarpa (DC.) Hertel & A.J.Schwab (1984)

Synonyms
- Patellaria macrocarpa DC. (1805); Lichen macrocarpus (DC.) Lam. (1813); Lecidea macrocarpa (DC.) Steud. (1824)

= Porpidia macrocarpa =

Species of lichen-forming fungus

Porpidia macrocarpa is a species of saxicolous (rock-dwelling), crustose lichen in the family Lecideaceae.

== Taxonomy ==
It was formally described as a new species in 1805 by the Swiss botanist Augustin Pyramus de Candolle, who originally classified it in the genus Patellaria. It has a long and extensive taxonomic history, having been shuffled to many different genera, and having been described several times under different names by different authors. In 1984, Hannes Hertel and Adolf Josef Schwab transferred it to the genus Porpidia, and it has largely been referred to that name since.

== Description ==
Porpidia macrocarpa is a crustose lichen with a variable thallus, typically appearing immersed (embedded in the substrate) to thin and continuous, but it can sometimes be thicker and become cracked (rimose) or divided into small sections (areolate). The surface of the thallus is rough and web-like (subarachnoid) with a colour range from pale grey to greenish-grey. It frequently shows patches or continuous areas of orange to rust-red due to oxidation. The medulla (internal tissue) does not react to iodine (I–). The prothallus (initial growth stage) is indistinct at the margins of immersed thalli but becomes wavy, black, and somewhat distinct at the margins of more superficial thalli.

The apothecia (fruiting bodies) are up to 3 mm in diameter, usually sessile (sitting directly on the thallus), abundant, and can be scattered or crowded together. They are constricted at the base with a thick, swollen true exciple (rim) that is persistent, black, shiny, and raised, ranging from entire to somewhat wavy (flexuose). The hyphae (filamentous fungal cells) measure 3–9 μm in diameter. The disc of the apothecia can be slightly concave to flat or convex, black or brown-black, with a matt or shiny finish, and sometimes covered with a grey powdery coating (pruina). Larger apothecia often appear to divide through the formation of secondary margins within the disc. The epithecium (upper layer of the hymenium) is pale brown to olive-brown, and the hymenium (spore-producing layer) measures 80–100 μm tall. The hypothecium (layer below the hymenium) and inner exciple may show a reddish tinge when treated with potassium hydroxide solution (K+).

The ascospores are elongated, measuring 16–20 μm in length and 6–11.5 μm in width. The medulla reacts variably to chemical spot tests, sometimes showing a yellowish reaction with potassium hydroxide (K±) and an orange reaction with p-phenylenediamine (Pd±), indicating the presence of stictic and cryptostictic acids.

== Habitat and distribution ==
In Nepal, Porpidia macrocarpa has been reported from 2,950 to 4,000 m elevation in a compilation of published records.

== Species interactions ==
Lichenicolous (lichen-dwelling) fungi that have been recorded growing on Porpidia macrocarpa include Cecidonia xenophana, Endococcus propinquus, E. rugulosus, Muellerella pygmaea, and Sclerococcum australe.
