= Gerhard Rambold =

German academic (born 1956)

Gerhard Walter Rambold
- Born: 1956 (age 69–70); Pocking, Lower Bavaria, Germany
- Occupations: Mycologist and lichenologist

Academic background
- Education: Diploma in Biology; PhD in systematic botany Habilitation in systematic botany
- Alma mater: LMU Munich
- Thesis: A monograph of the saxicolous lecideoid lichens of Australia (excl. Tasmania) (1989)

Gerhard Rambold (born 1956) is a German lichenologist, mycologist and university professor who has led the mycology group at the University of Bayreuth since 1999. He is recognised for creating LIAS, "A Global Information System for Lichenised and Non‑Lichenised Ascomycetes", which integrates morphological, molecular and distributional data into interactive identification tools. Combining extensive field collections with bio‑ and ecoinformatics, his research spans taxonomy, photobiont ecology and fungal biodiversity on several continents.

== Early life and education ==
Rambold was born in Pocking, Lower Bavaria in 1956. He grew up in a musically oriented family in southern Germany but gravitated toward biology while studying at LMU Munich under the influence of Hannes Hertel. He earned a biology diploma in 1984 with a thesis on rock-dwelling lecideoid lichens from Iceland, demonstrating an early commitment to meticulous specimen work.

Under Hertel's supervision he completed a doctorate in 1989, producing a monograph on Australian saxicolous lecideoid lichens based largely on specimens he gathered during an extensive collecting trip across the continent. His habilitation in systematic botany followed in 1997 at Munich, concentrating on inter‑lecanoralean associations and launching a productive collaboration with his partner Dagmar Triebel.

== Career and research ==
Between 1995 and 1998 Rambold lectured at both the Technical University of Munich and LMU before accepting a full professorship at Bayreuth in 1999, where he founded the modern mycology section. He simultaneously headed the university's Central Laboratory for DNA Analytics and Ecoinformatics until 2015, embedding molecular methods and data management into lichenological training and infrastructure.

Rambold's interest in bioinformatics led to LIAS ("A Global Information System for Lichenised and Non‑Lichenised Ascomycetes"), which links taxonomic concepts, character definitions and checklist data with multilingual, web‑based keys and dynamic distribution maps. The system has become a reference model for biodiversity information platforms and underpins numerous identification programmes worldwide.

His laboratory has explored photobiont specificity, soil lichen diversity in Southern Africa and the molecular ecology of symbiotic fungi, producing influential studies such as the 1998 Bryologist paper on photobionts as phylogenetic indicators and subsequent surveys of arid‑zone lichen communities. He co‑edited the 2004 Festschrift "Contributions to Lichenology" honouring Hertel and has supervised doctoral candidates including Andreas Beck, Marcela Eugenia da Silva Cáceres, Gregor Hagedorn, Alexandra Kehl and Derek Peršoh.

Rambold is a regular speaker at international meetings—such as the 2004 fifth International Association for Lichenology congress in Tartu—and collaborates on projects that standardise fungal trait data for ecological modelling and conservation planning. He is a section editor for the academic journals Mycological Progress and MycoKeys.

Since 2017 he is member and chair of the International Training Centre for Environmental Research (ITCER) in Kenya. Rambold coordinates major projects, with a focus on Africa.

== Eponyms ==
Several taxa have been named to honour Rambold. These include the lichen genus Ramboldia Kantvilas & Elix 1994, the lichen species Relicina ramboldii Elix & J.Johnst. (1988); Xanthoparmelia gerhardii Elix & J.Johnst. (1988); Rimularia ramboldiana Kantvilas & Elix (2007); Sculptolumina ramboldii Elix & H.Mayrhofer (2018), Rinodina gerhardii H.Mayrhofer & Elix (2020); Tremella ramboldiae Diederich & W.R.Buck (2022); the subspecies Lecanora subimmersa subsp. ramboldii Lumbsch & Elix (1994); as well as the two spider taxa Megateg ramboldi Raven & Stumkat (2005) and Spinasteron ramboldi Baehr & Churchill (2003).

== Selected publications ==
- Parra, Luis A.; Zamora, Juan C.; Hawksworth, David L.; Hibbett, David S.; Kirk, Paul M.; Lücking, Robert; Rambold, Gerhard; Bensch, Konstanze; Yao, Yi-Jian; Robert, Vincent; Triebel, Dagmar (2018). "Proposals for consideration at IMC11 to modify provisions related solely to fungi in the International Code of Nomenclature for algae, fungi, and plants". IMA Fungus. 9 (1): i–vii. doi:10.1007/BF03449481.
- Peršoh, Derek; Stolle, Nancy; Brachmann, Andreas; Begerow, Dominik; Rambold, Gerhard (2018). "Fungal guilds are evenly distributed along a vertical spruce forest soil profile while individual fungi show pronounced niche partitioning". Mycological Progress. 17 (8): 925–939. Bibcode:2018MycPr..17..925P. doi:10.1007/s11557-018-1405-6.
- Gkoutselis, Gerasimos; Rohrbach, Stephan; Harjes, Janno; Obst, Martin; Brachmann, Andreas; Horn, Marcus A.; Rambold, Gerhard (2021). "Microplastics accumulate fungal pathogens in terrestrial ecosystems". Scientific Reports. 11 (1) 13214. Bibcode:2021NatSR..1113214G. doi:10.1038/s41598-021-92405-7. PMC 8282651. PMID 34267241.
- Schweiger, Andreas H.; Ullmann, G. Matthias; Nürk, Nicolai M.; Triebel, Dagmar; Schobert, Rainer; Rambold, Gerhard (2022). "Chemical properties of key metabolites determine the global distribution of lichens". Ecology Letters. 25 (2): 416–426. Bibcode:2022EcolL..25..416S. doi:10.1111/ele.13930. PMID 34786803.
- Triebel, Dagmar; Grunz, Ariane; Seifert, Stefan; Link, Anton; Rambold, Gerhard (2021). DiversityNaviKey, a Progressive Web Application for interactive diagnosis and identification. Gesellschaft für Informatik. pp. 517–538. doi:10.18420/INFORMATIK2021-040. ISBN 978-3-88579-708-1.
- Flessa, Fabienne; Harjes, Janno; Cáceres, Marcela E. S.; Rambold, Gerhard (2021). "Comparative analyses of sooty mould communities from Brazil and Central Europe". Mycological Progress. 20 (7): 869–887. Bibcode:2021MycPr..20..869F. doi:10.1007/s11557-021-01700-0.
- Krasylenko, Yuliya; Kinge, Tonjock Rosemary; Sosnovsky, Yevhen; Atamas, Natalia; Tofel, Katamssadan Haman; Horielov, Oleksii; Rambold, Gerhard (2022). "Consuming and consumed: Biotic interactions of African mistletoes across different trophic levels". Biotropica. 54 (4): 1103–1119. Bibcode:2022Biotr..54.1103K. doi:10.1111/btp.13130.

== See also ==
- Category:Taxa named by Gerhard Rambold
