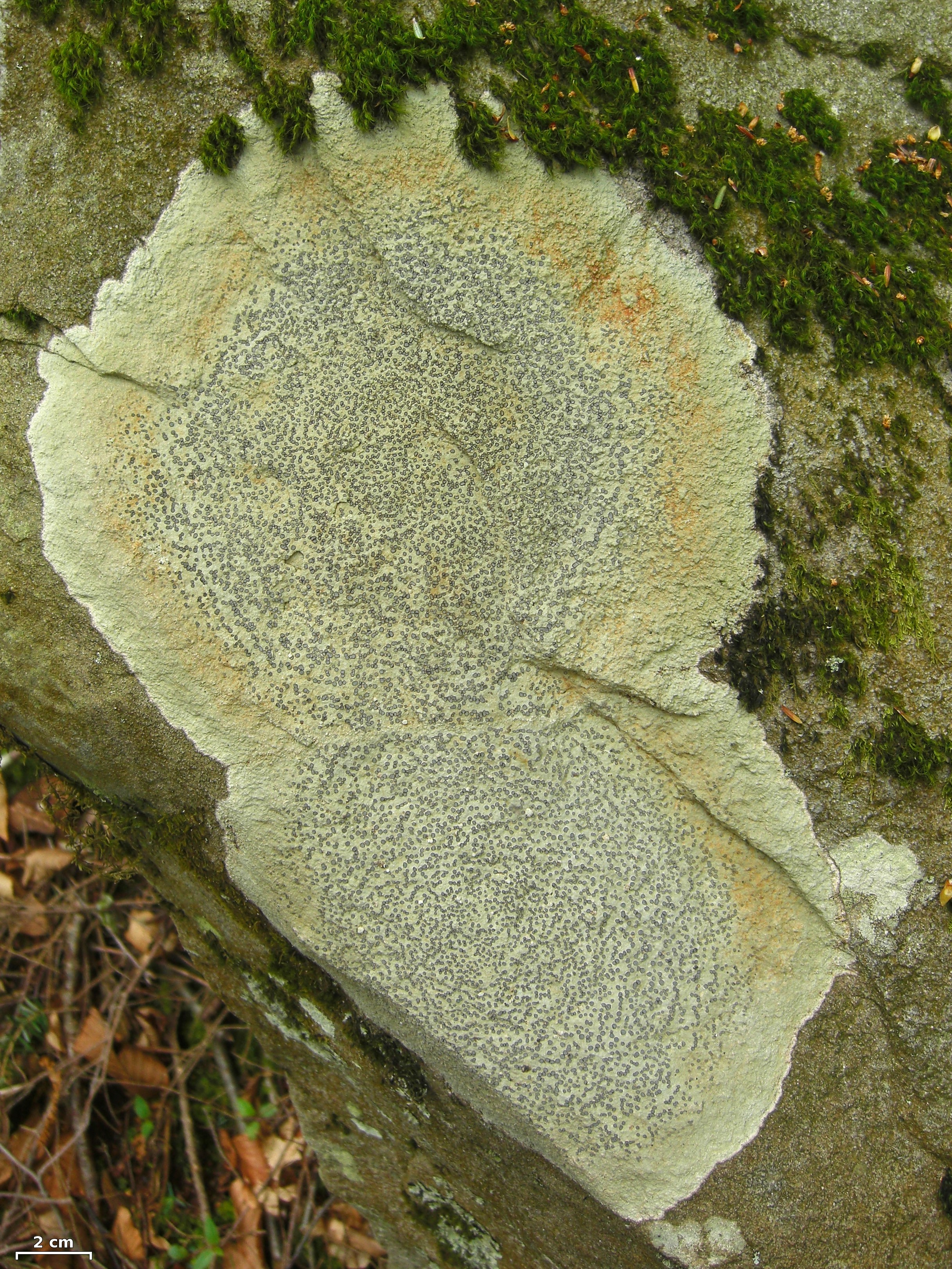
- Porpidia albocaerulescens

Scientific classification
- Kingdom: Fungi
- Division: Ascomycota
- Class: Lecanoromycetes
- Order: Lecideales
- Family: Lecideaceae
- Genus: Porpidia; Körb. (1855)

Type species
- Porpidia trullisata (Kremp.) Körb. (1855)

Synonyms
- Haplocarpon M.Choisy (1936); Huilia Zahlbr. (1930)

= Porpidia =

Genus of lichen-forming fungi

Porpidia is a genus of crustose lichens in the family Lecideaceae. Porpidia species primarily inhabit siliceous rocks, pebbles, and stonework, with rare occurrences on bark, wood, and compacted soil. The thallus, or body of the lichen, varies in appearance from thick and crusty to barely visible. It may form a continuous layer or develop cracks resulting in a segmented, areolate structure. The colour of the thallus ranges from grey and white to orange.

== Taxonomy ==
Porpidia was circumscribed by the German lichenologist Gustav Wilhelm Körber in 1855, with Porpidia trullisata designated as the type species.

== Description ==
Genus Porpidia consists of crustose lichens, meaning the thallus (the main body of the lichen) is closely attached to the surface it grows on. The thallus can vary in appearance, from thick and scaly to almost invisible, and may be solid or cracked into small pieces called areoles. Its colour typically ranges from grey to white, though some species may show orange hues. A prothallus, a thin, often black or orange border between neighbouring lichens, may be present but is not always visible. The lichen's inner structure, or medulla, may or may not react with iodine (I+ or I–), and some species produce powdery soredia for reproduction, while others do not. One species of Porpidia even has isidia—small, finger-like structures that aid in reproduction. The lichen's green algae partner is usually from the genera Trebouxia or Asterochloris.

The apothecia (fruiting bodies) are common and can appear either scattered or in clusters. These round, dark brown to black discs are often relatively large, ranging from 0.5 to 3 mm in diameter, and may be coated with a frosty layer (a pruina). The apothecia have a distinct outer margin, which may fade as the lichen ages, and are seated directly on the surface of the thallus without a thalline margin (a rim formed by the thallus itself). The rim surrounding the apothecia is usually dark blue-black or brown, and made of tightly packed fungal filaments.

Under the surface, the reproductive layer (the hymenium) reacts with iodine (I+) to turn blue, a useful trait for identification. The asci, the spore-producing sacs, each hold eight spores and have a distinctive shape called the "Porpidia-type". The ascospores are typically ellipsoid and measure 15–22 μm long, with a thick outer layer. In some species, other reproductive structures, known as conidiomata, are present and often have a rough surface.

== Species ==
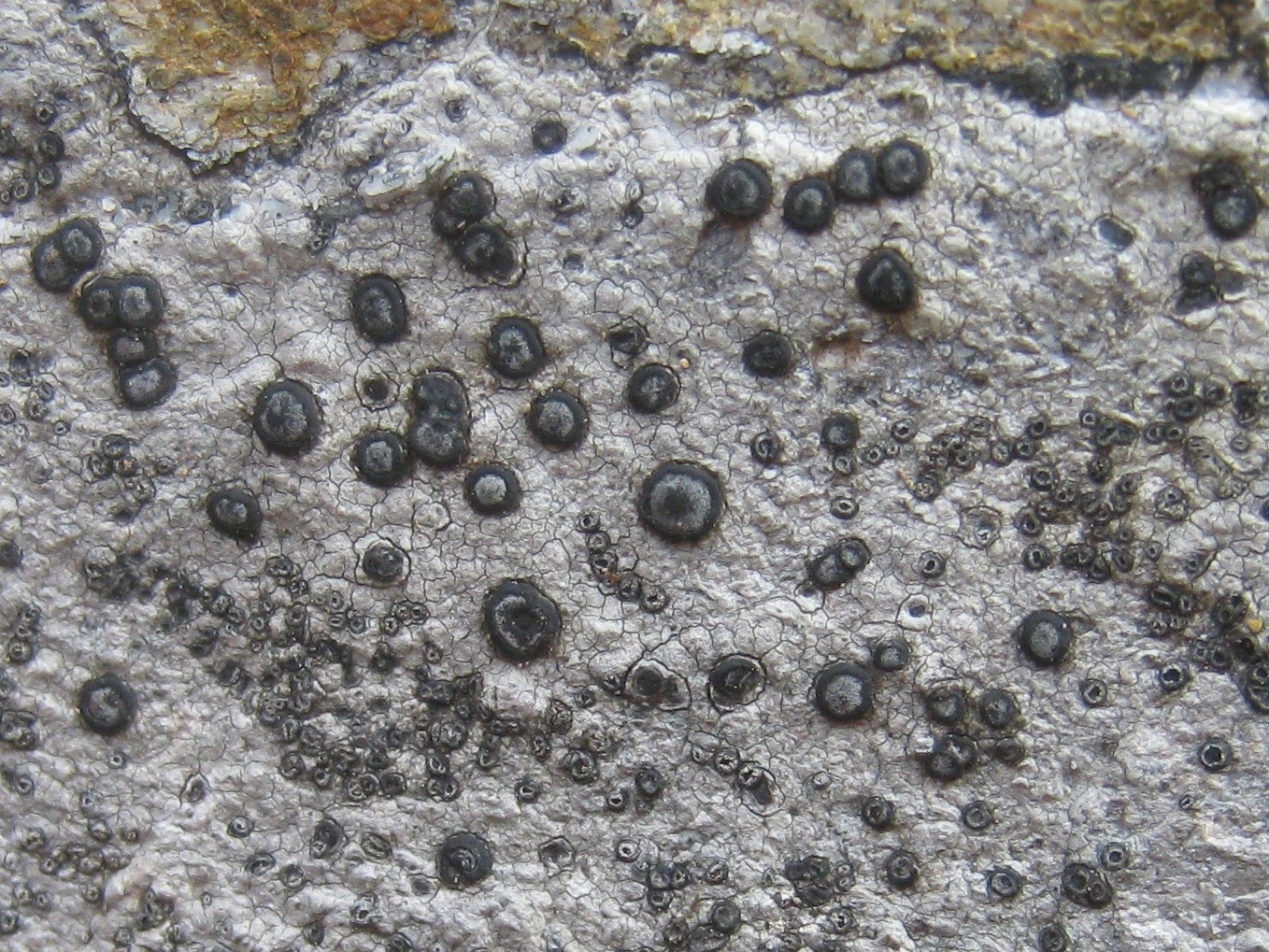
Porpidia cinereoatra

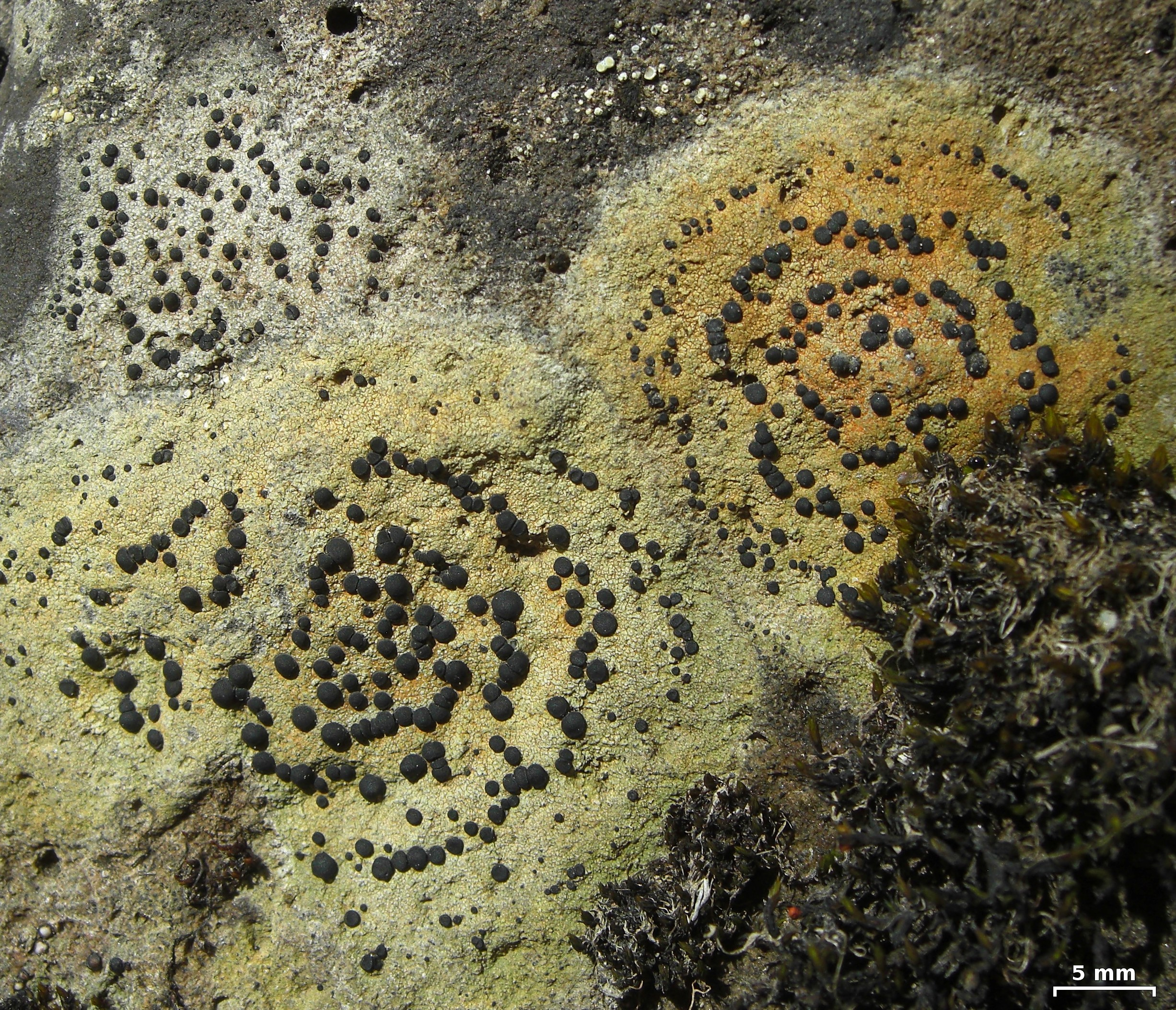
Porpidia crustulata

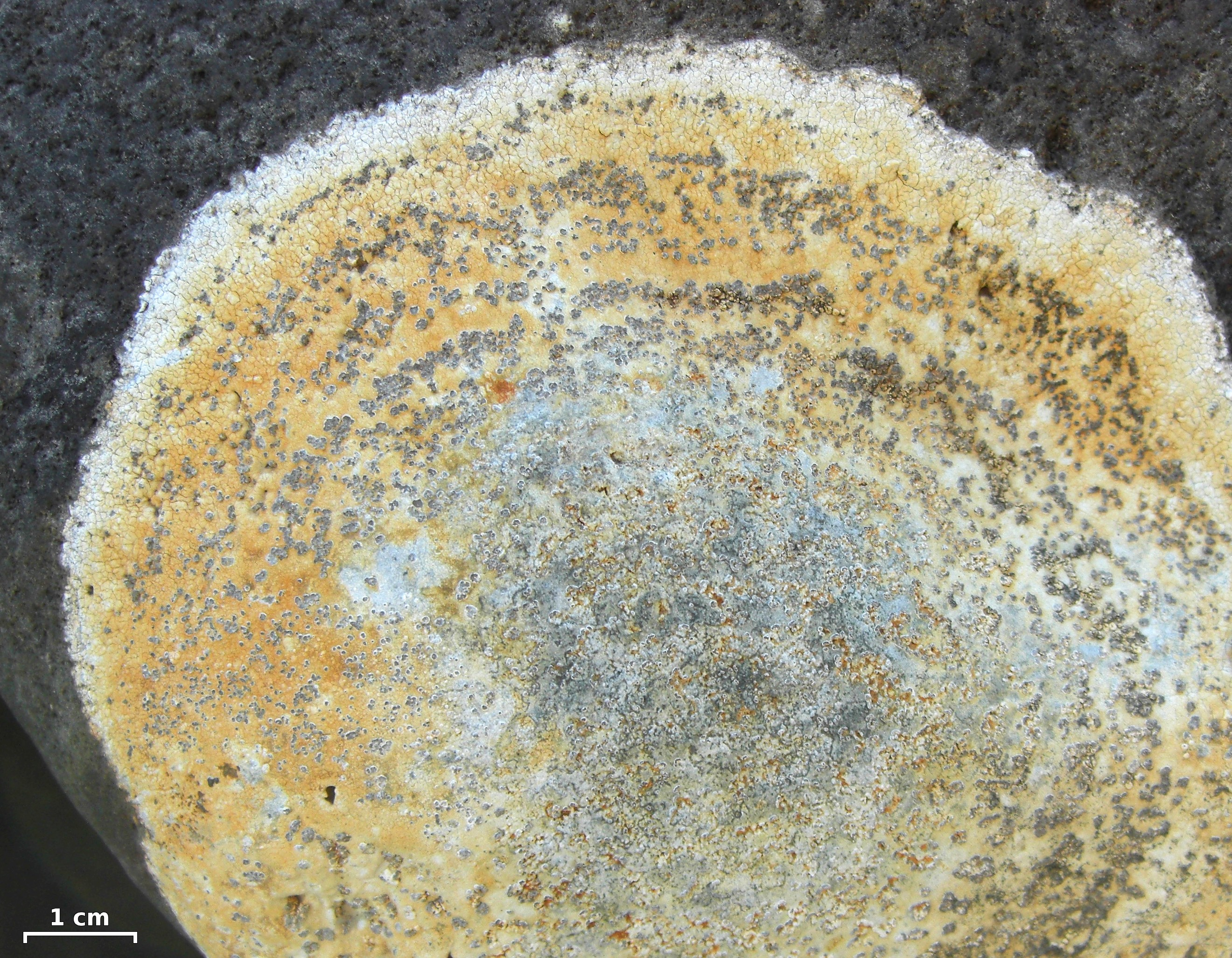
Porpidia ochrolemma

As of May 2025, Species Fungorum accepts 41 species of Porpidia:

- Porpidia albocaerulescens (Wulfen) Hertel & Knoph (1984)
- Porpidia cinereoatra (Ach.) Hertel & Knoph (1984)
- Porpidia circumnigrata (Vězda) Knežević & Mayrhofer (2008)
- Porpidia contraponenda (Arnold) Knoph & Hertel (1984)
- Porpidia crustulata (Ach.) Hertel & Knoph (1984)
- Porpidia degelii (H.Magn.) Lendemer (2014)
- Porpidia flavicunda (Ach.) Gowan (1989)
- Porpidia flavocruenta Fryday & Buschbom (2005) - Austria, the British Isles, Scandinavia, Iceland, and North America (Alaska)
- Porpidia grisea Gowan (1989)
- Porpidia hydrophila (Fr.) Hertel & A.J.Schwab (1984)
- Porpidia hypostictica L.Hu & Z.T.Zhao (2015) – China
- Porpidia irrigua Orange (2014)
- Porpidia islandica Fryday (2005) - Scotland and Iceland
- Porpidia kashmirensis Fayyaz, Afshan, Niazi & Khalid (2022) – Pakistan
- Porpidia littoralis P.M.McCarthy & Elix (2018) – Australia
- Porpidia lowiana Gowan (1989)
- Porpidia macrocarpa (DC.) Hertel & A.J.Schwab (1984)
- Porpidia melinodes (Körb.) Gowan & Ahti (1993)
- Porpidia nadvornikiana (Vězda) Hertel (1984)
- Porpidia navarina U.Rupr. & Türk (2016) – Chile
- Porpidia ochrolemma (Vain.) Brodo & R.Sant. (1995)
- Porpidia pachythallina Fryday (2005) - British Isles
- Porpidia platycarpoides (Bagl.) Hertel (1987)
- Porpidia rugosa (Taylor) Coppins & Fryday (2005)
- Porpidia seakensis Fryday (2020) – Alaska
- Porpidia shangrila Xin Y.Wang & Lu L.Zhang (2012) – China
- Porpidia soredizodes (Lamy) J.R.Laundon (1989)
- Porpidia speirea (Ach.) Kremp. (1861)
- Porpidia squamosa Xin Y.Wang & Lu L.Zhang (2012) – China
- Porpidia stephanodes (Stirt.) Hertel (1984)
- Porpidia striata Fryday (2005) - British Isles
- Porpidia submelinodes Osyczka & Olech (2011) – Antarctica
- Porpidia subsimplex (H.Magn.) Fryday (2006)
- Porpidia superba (Körb.) Hertel & Knoph (1984)
- Porpidia thomsonii Gowan (1989)
- Porpidia trullisata (Kremp.) Körb. (1855)
- Porpidia tuberculosa (Sm.) Hertel & Knoph (1984)
- Porpidia ulleungdoensis S.Y.Kond., L.Lőkös & J.P.Halda (2019) – Ulleungdo, South Korea
- Porpidia umbonifera (Müll.Arg.) Rambold (1989)
- Porpidia vulcanoides Hertel & Fryday (2014)
- Porpidia zeoroides (Anzi) Knoph & Hertel (1984)
