= Diorygma intermedium =

Scientific classification
- Domain: Eukaryota
- Kingdom: Fungi
- Division: Ascomycota
- Class: Lecanoromycetes
- Order: Graphidales
- Family: Graphidaceae
- Genus: Diorygma
- Species: D. intermedium

Binomial name
- Diorygma intermedium Kalb, Staiger & Elix (2004)

Species of lichen

Diorygma intermedium is a species of corticolous (bark-dwelling) crustose lichen in the family Graphidaceae. It is found in Mexico, Central and South America, and the Caribbean, where it grows in sun-exposed tropical rainforests and restingas. The species was described as new to science in 2004 by the lichenologists Klaus Kalb, Bettina Staiger, and John A. Elix from a collection made in Trinidad. It contains hypostictic and hypoconstictic acids as its main secondary metabolites (lichen products).

== Taxonomy ==
Diorygma intermedium was described by Klaus Kalb, Bettina Staiger and John A. Elix from a specimen collected on bark along the Blue Basin–Diego Martin Road, Trinidad. The specific epithet alludes to its intermediate position between two well-known members of the genus: it shares the white-pruinose lirellae and chemical profile of D. poitaei yet produces smaller, more tightly septate spores, and while its spores match those of D. sipmanii in size, it differs by the much taller hymenium and the clear iodine staining reaction of the ascus tip. Chemically it belongs to the hypostictic acid series, containing hypostictic and hypoconstictic acids as majors with traces of O-acetyl-hypoconstictic acid; it lacks the protocetraric and stictic derivatives found in several close relatives.

== Description ==
The thallus forms a thin, glossy film—creamy white, pale grey or sometimes tinged greenish or reddish when wet—ranging from 20 micrometres (μm) to just over 70 μm thick. Its surface is even but usually fissured into small plates, and a distinct cortical "skin" is either absent or vestigial. A layer of green algal cells sits 20–50 μm below the surface, while the medulla beneath it reaches 150–190 μm and is packed with colourless crystals.

Reproductive bodies are numerous long slits (lirellae) 0.5–2 mm by 0.2–0.6 mm that begin immersed and later burst through the thallus. Their margins, usually tinged white by a fine powder (pruina), rise slightly and may separate from the surrounding crust by a narrow fissure. The lateral wall (excipulum) is yellowish to whitish, uncarbonised and only weakly developed. Inside, a well-developed hymenium stands 160–210 μm high and stains bluish-violet in iodine in its upper zone. The cap (epithecium) consists of a mesh of branched paraphysis tips containing colourless granules and some dead hyphae; individual paraphyses are 1–2 μm wide and tend to glue together near their summits.

Each ascus bears four to six (occasionally eight) ascospores. The spores are colourless, thick-walled and muriform—divided by both cross-walls and longitudinal walls into a grid of chambers. They measure 18–27 μm long by 10–15 μm wide, with the peripheral and central cells of roughly equal size and a very thin gelatinous halo when young. No asexual pycnidia have been seen, and thin-layer chromatography reveals no secondary metabolites beyond the hypostictic acid complex.

=== Similar species ===
Diorygma albovirescens is the taxon most likely to be mistaken for D. intermedium. Both lichens develop long, slightly wavy, branching ascomata that lie immersed in the thallus; in surface view they look like narrow cracks with a whitish disc edged by a raised rim of thallus tissue and set off by a deep groove. Reliable separation relies on chemistry and range rather than on external form. D. intermedium synthesises hypostictic acid derivatives (hypostictic, hypoconstictic and α-acetyl-hypoconstictic acids), whereas D. albovirescens contains the stictic acid complex (stictic, constictic acid and cryptostictic acids). Their distributions also diverge: D. intermedium is widespread in the Neotropics, while D. albovirescens is known only from India.

== Habitat and distribution ==
Current records restrict D. intermedium to Central and South America. It grows best in well-lit tropical rainforests or coastal restinga, from sea-level up to the lower montane belt. Field notes indicate a preference for smooth, hard bark exposed to moving air but protected from direct, prolonged sunlight, and collections range from Mexico and the Caribbean southwards into Brazil and Venezuela.
