= Xanthoparmelia auricampa =

Scientific classification
- Kingdom: Fungi
- Division: Ascomycota
- Class: Lecanoromycetes
- Order: Lecanorales
- Family: Parmeliaceae
- Genus: Xanthoparmelia
- Species: X. auricampa

Binomial name
- Xanthoparmelia auricampa Elix (2006)
- Location of the holotype in Western Australia

Species of foliose lichen

Xanthoparmelia auricampa is a little-known species of terricolous (ground-dwelling), foliose lichen in the family Parmeliaceae. It is endemic to Western Australia.

== Taxonomy ==
Xanthoparmelia auricampa was described by John Elix, who distinguished it from closely related species due to its unique chemical profile and specific morphological characteristics. The type specimen (holotype) was collected by Elix on 24 April 2004, and is housed at the Western Australian Herbarium (PERTH). The collection site is located in Western Australia, 2.5 km east of Bullabulling and 27.5 km west of Coolgardie, at an elevation of 440 metres. The specimen was found growing on soil in a Eucalyptus woodland habitat with Acacia and other shrubs, characterised by laterite outcrops. The species epithet auricampa is derived from Latin, combining aurum (gold) and campus (field), alluding its discovery in the goldfield regions of Western Australia.

== Description ==
Xanthoparmelia auricampa forms small foliose to somewhat fruticose rosettes, loosely adnate to the substrate, and typically 2–3 cm wide. The lobes of the lichen are more or less linear, 0.8–1.5 mm wide, and show dichotomous to trichotomous branching. The upper surface is yellow-green, becoming rugulose and brown at the tips as it matures. Unlike many lichens, it lacks isidia and soredia but features small, somewhat cylindrical lobules that are terminal on the lobes. The lower surface of the lichen is pale to dark brown, canaliculate (channeled), and smooth with moderately dense, simple or occasionally branched, black rhizines.

Chemically, the lichen cortex does not react to potassium hydroxide solution (K−), while the medulla is K+ (yellow then red). It contains usnic acid and a combination of lichen products including norstictic, hypostictic, and hyposalazinic acids.

=== Similar species ===
Xanthoparmelia auricampa is most similar to X. terrestris, sharing comparable morphology and norstictic acid content in the medulla. However, X. auricampa is distinguished by its smaller rosettes (2–3 cm vs 5–10 cm), narrower lobes (0.8–1.5 mm vs 1–3 mm), and distinct medullary chemistry. While X. terrestris contains salazinic acid (major), norstictic acid, consalzinic acid, and protocetraric acid, X. auricampa uniquely features norstictic acid as its major compound, along with minor amounts of hypostictic, hyposalazinic, and connorstictic acids. X. auricampa's distinctive traits include its small foliose thallus, yellow-green convex upper surface, di- to trichotomously branched lobes, brown canaliculate lower surface, and presence of subterete lobules without isidia.

== Habitat and distribution ==
Xanthoparmelia auricampa is known exclusively from its type locality in Western Australia.

== See also ==
- List of Xanthoparmelia species
