= Xanthoparmelia lobuliferella =

Scientific classification
- Domain: Eukaryota
- Kingdom: Fungi
- Division: Ascomycota
- Class: Lecanoromycetes
- Order: Lecanorales
- Family: Parmeliaceae
- Genus: Xanthoparmelia
- Species: X. lobuliferella

Binomial name
- Xanthoparmelia lobuliferella Elix (2002)

Species of lichen

Xanthoparmelia lobuliferella is a species of saxicolous (rock-dwelling), foliose lichen in the family Parmeliaceae. Found in South Africa, it was formally described as a new species in 2002 by Australian lichenologist John Elix. The type specimen was collected from the Jonaskop mountain (Cape Province) at an altitude of 1,600 m (5,200 ft); there it was found growing on south-facing rocks. It contains several lichen products: major amounts of usnic acid and stictic acid, and minor amounts of constictic acid, norstictic acid, cryptostictic acid, lobaric acid, stenosporonic acid, lichesterinic acid, and protolichesterinic acid. The species epithet refers to its resemblance to Xanthoparmelia lobulifera.

== See also ==
- List of Xanthoparmelia species
