= Xanthoparmelia subverrucigera =

Scientific classification
- Kingdom: Fungi
- Division: Ascomycota
- Class: Lecanoromycetes
- Order: Lecanorales
- Family: Parmeliaceae
- Genus: Xanthoparmelia
- Species: X. subverrucigera

Binomial name
- Xanthoparmelia subverrucigera O.Blanco, A.Crespo, & Elix (2005)
- Holotype: Zaragoza, Spain

Species of lichen

Xanthoparmelia subverrucigera is a species of saxicolous (rock-dwelling), foliose lichen in the family Parmeliaceae. It was formally described in 2005 from specimens collected in Embid de la Ribera, Spain. The lichen forms yellowish-green, flat growths measuring 3–5 centimetres across with irregular lobes that adhere closely to the rock surface. Its distinctive features include a wrinkled surface with black-edged margins, small finger-like projections (isidia) that may branch in a coral-like manner, and a brown underside with simple root-like structures. The species has a disjunct distribution, occurring in both southern Europe and southern Africa, and can be distinguished from similar species primarily by its brown lower surface and specific chemical composition.

== Taxonomy ==
The lichen was formally described as a new species in 2005 by lichenologists Oscar Blanco, Ana Crespo, and John Elix. The type specimen was collected by the authors in Embid de la Ribera (Zaragoza Province) at an altitude of 510 m (1,670 ft); here, the lichen was found growing on siliceous rocks. It has also been collected from Rhodes Matopos National Park in Zimbabwe. The specific epithet subverrucigera alludes to its resemblance with X. verrucigera.

== Description ==
Xanthoparmelia subverrucigera forms moderately-sized growths measuring 3–5 cm across, which adhere closely to the rock substrate. The thallus consists of lobes that are arranged either side by side or slightly overlapping one another. These lobes are somewhat irregular in shape, branch in an irregular pattern, and measure 1–3 mm in width. The edges of the lobes lack tiny hair-like structures (cilia) and have slightly rounded tips.

The upper surface of the lichen displays a yellow-green colouration and is generally flat without spots (emaculate). While the tips of the lobes appear shiny, the central portions are duller and have a wrinkled texture (rugulose). The lobe margins are characteristically black, particularly at the tips. This lichen does not produce powdery reproductive structures (soredia) but instead develops small, finger-like outgrowths called isidia. These isidia are moderately dense across the thallus, beginning as globular structures before developing into cylindrical projections that occasionally branch in a coral-like manner. The tips of these isidia are covered by a continuous cortical layer (syncorticate) and are typically blackened.

The internal layer (medulla) of the lichen is white. The underside of the thallus ranges from medium to dark brown in colour, becoming black at the tips. Sparse to moderate numbers of simple root-like structures (rhizines) emerge from the lower surface and match its colouration. Sexual reproductive structures (apothecia) and asexual spore-producing structures (pycnidia) have not been observed in this species.

When subjected to chemical spot tests, the cortex is K−, C−, and KC+ (pale yellow). The medulla K+ (yellow to orange), C−, KC+ (red), and P+ (orange). The lichen contains several secondary metabolites, with usnic acid in minor amounts, stictic acid as the major component, and various other substances including constictic, verrucigeric, lusitanic, cryptostictic, connorstictic, and methyl stictic acids in varying concentrations.

== Similar species ==
Xanthoparmelia subverrucigera can be challenging to distinguish from several closely related species. It most closely resembles X. verrucigera, as both species have similar adnate thalli with contiguous, sub-irregular lobes, moderately to densely isidiate upper surfaces, and identical chemistry in their medullary layer. The key difference is in the lower surface colouration: X. subverrucigera has a mid-brown to dark brown underside, while X. verrucigera displays a jet-black lower surface. Also, the isidia of X. subverrucigera tend to become coralloid-branched, whereas those of X. verrucigera are typically simple or only rarely sparsely branched and verrucose.

This species might also be confused with X. plittii, which similarly possesses cylindrical isidia, a brown lower surface, and the stictic acid complex in its medulla. Chromatography provides the most reliable method for differentiation: X. plittii contains stictic, constictic, and norstictic acids, while X. subverrucigera contains stictic, constictic, lusitanic, and verrucigeric acids but lacks norstictic acid.

Molecular studies using various DNA sequences have demonstrated that X. subverrucigera forms a strongly supported clade with X. verrucigera and X. transvaalensis. These three species all have a disjunct distribution pattern, occurring in both southern Europe and southern Africa, but rarely elsewhere.

== See also ==
- List of Xanthoparmelia species
