= Xanthoparmelia micromaculata =

Scientific classification
- Domain: Eukaryota
- Kingdom: Fungi
- Division: Ascomycota
- Class: Lecanoromycetes
- Order: Lecanorales
- Family: Parmeliaceae
- Genus: Xanthoparmelia
- Species: X. micromaculata

Binomial name
- Xanthoparmelia micromaculata Elix (2002)

Species of lichen

Xanthoparmelia micromaculata is a species of saxicolous (rock-dwelling), lichen in the family Parmeliaceae. Found in South Africa, it was formally described as a new species in 2002 by Australian lichenologist John Elix. The type specimen was collected from the summit of Waboomsberg mountain (Cape Province) at an altitude of 1,220 m (4,000 ft). It is only known from the type locality. The lichen has a pale yellow-green, somewhat crustose thallus, reaching a diameter of up to 1 cm (0.4 in) wide. It contains several lichen products: stictic acid as a major metabolite, minor amounts of usnic acid, constictic acid, and hypostictic acid, and minor or trace amounts of norstictic acid, hyposalazinic acid, and cryptostictic acid. The species epithet refers to the prominent maculae (small pale spots or blotches) on the thallus surface.

== See also ==
- List of Xanthoparmelia species
