= Xanthoparmelia treurensis =

Scientific classification
- Kingdom: Fungi
- Division: Ascomycota
- Class: Lecanoromycetes
- Order: Lecanorales
- Family: Parmeliaceae
- Genus: Xanthoparmelia
- Species: X. treurensis

Binomial name
- Xanthoparmelia treurensis Hale, T.H.Nash, Elix (1986)

Species of lichen

Xanthoparmelia treurensis is a species of saxicolous (rock-dwelling), foliose lichen in the family Parmeliaceae. Found in Southern Africa, it was formally described as a new species in 1986 by the lichenologists Mason Hale, Thomas Hawkes Nash III, and John Elix. The type specimen was collected by Hale from Pilgrims Rest (Transvaal) at an elevation of 1,200 m (3,900 ft), where it was found growing on sandstone in a coppice area. The species epithet treurensis refers to the Treur River, which is in the type locality. The lichen thallus is dark yellowish green and measures 6–8 cm (2.4–3.1 in) broad, comprising somewhat linear lobes that are 2–5 mm wide. It contains several lichen acids (secondary metabolites): stictic, constictic, cryptostictic, constipatic and usnic acids, as well as trace amounts of norstictic and connorstictic acids.

== See also ==
- List of Xanthoparmelia species
