= Diorygma megasporum =

Scientific classification
- Domain: Eukaryota
- Kingdom: Fungi
- Division: Ascomycota
- Class: Lecanoromycetes
- Order: Graphidales
- Family: Graphidaceae
- Genus: Diorygma
- Species: D. megasporum

Binomial name
- Diorygma megasporum Kalb, Staiger & Elix (2004)

Species of lichen

Diorygma megasporum is a species of corticolous (bark-dwelling) crustose lichen in the family Graphidaceae. Found in India and China, it was described as new to science in 2004 by the lichenologists Klaus Kalb, Bettina Staiger, and John A. Elix. The species epithet megasporum alludes to its relatively large ascospores, which, in combination with its 2–6 spored asci, is unusual in the genus Diorygma. The lichen contains stictic, α-acetylconstictic acid, and constictic acids as major secondary metabolites.

== Taxonomy ==
Diorygma megasporum was introduced by Klaus Kalb, Bettina Staiger and John A. Elix on the basis of a 19th-century collection from mixed montane forest near Yomah (Pegu Yoma, Myanmar). The epithet megasporum reflects its unusually large, densely partitioned ascospores. Within Diorygma the taxon stands out by combining very broad lirellae with asci that hold only two to six spores—an arrangement otherwise rare in the genus—and by a chemistry dominated by stictic-series metabolites (stictic, O-acetylconstictic and constictic acids, with traces of norstictic and hypostictic acids). Its overall spore shape is reminiscent of D. hololeucum, but that species contains protocetraric acid and has far more robust, bulging lirellae, while other large-spored members of the genus differ in either hymenial height or iodine reactions.

== Description ==
The lichen forms a thin, matt crust 50–100 micrometres (μm) thick that ranges from off-white through cream to pale grey-green. The surface is uneven, cracked along the elongated fruiting slits, and lacks a true outer skin (pseudocortex). Green algal cells reach almost to the surface, while a medulla 0–10 μm below may hold tiny crystals.

Fruiting bodies (lirellae) are plentiful, measuring 0.5–4 × 0.2–0.7 mm. They lie immersed at first, but their pale, powder-dusted flanks often appear through fine cracks as the thallus matures. Margins are indistinct, only rarely rising into a thin rim separated from the crust by a slit. The disc itself opens narrowly, carrying a thick pale-grey to buff bloom (pruina). The supporting wall (excipulum) is inconspicuous and yellowish at the base, laterally pale yellow-brown and built from loosely interwoven, swollen hyphae.

Inside, a clear hymenium 180–200 μm tall stains bluish-violet in iodine along its upper and outer zones, while the top 30 μm are brown owing to a well-developed, partly carbonised epithecium. Supporting threads (paraphyses) are only about 1 μm wide, run close together and branch laterally into a delicate network. Each broadly club-shaped (clavate ascus contains two to six colourless, thick-walled spores. These spores are conspicuously large, measuring 80–170 (more rarely up to 220) μm long by 21–55 μm wide, and divided by both transverse and longitudinal walls into dozens of equally sized cubicles (muriform). Spore size can vary markedly within a single ascus; some are wrapped in a 2–3 μm gelatinous sheath and display a faint violet internal staining reaction in iodine. No asexual pycnidia have been observed, and standard spot tests give negative results, consistent with the stictic-series chemistry detected by thin-layer chromatography.

== Habitat and distribution ==
The holotype grew on tree bark at about 2000 m elevation in the eastern Himalaya, and additional specimens extend the range southward to the Sikkim Himalaya (Tonglo, 1800–2100 m elevation) and westward to the moist evergreen forests of the Western Ghats (Amboli, roughly 1050 m). Across this latitudinal span the species occupies humid montane or submontane rainforest where frequent mists, moderate light and constant air movement create a damp but aerated microclimate on smooth bark. At the time of its original publication, D. megasporum was regarded as an Indian endemic restricted to well-watered mid-elevation forests in both the eastern and western mountain chains. It was later identified from China, indicating a broader pantropical distribution. It is one of ten Diorygma species that have been recorded in China.
