= Xanthoparmelia waboomsbergensis =

Scientific classification
- Domain: Eukaryota
- Kingdom: Fungi
- Division: Ascomycota
- Class: Lecanoromycetes
- Order: Lecanorales
- Family: Parmeliaceae
- Genus: Xanthoparmelia
- Species: X. waboomsbergensis

Binomial name
- Xanthoparmelia waboomsbergensis Elix (2002)

Species of lichen

Xanthoparmelia waboomsbergensis is a species of foliose lichen in the family Parmeliaceae. It was formally described as a new species in 2002 by Australian lichenologist John Elix. The type specimen was collected from the summit of Waboomsberg mountain (Cape Province) at an altitude of 1,220 m (4,000 ft). The species epithet refers to the type locality, the only place the lichen is known to occur.

== Description ==
The thallus of Xanthoparmelia waboomsbergensis has a somewhat crustose morphology, with a tight attachment to its substrate; its colour is pale yellow-green, reaching a diameter of up to 1.5 cm (0.6 in). The lower thallus surface is black, with simple (i.e., unbranched), black rhizines. Xanthoparmelia waboomsbergensis contains several lichen products: stictic acid and constictic acid as major metabolites, minor amounts of usnic acid, and trace amounts of norstictic acid and cryptostictic acid.

== See also ==
- List of Xanthoparmelia species
