= Xanthoparmelia malawiensis =

Scientific classification
- Domain: Eukaryota
- Kingdom: Fungi
- Division: Ascomycota
- Class: Lecanoromycetes
- Order: Lecanorales
- Family: Parmeliaceae
- Genus: Xanthoparmelia
- Species: X. malawiensis

Binomial name
- Xanthoparmelia malawiensis Elix (2002)

Species of lichen

Xanthoparmelia malawiensis is a species of saxicolous (rock-dwelling), foliose lichen in the family Parmeliaceae. Found in Malawi, it was formally described as a new species in 2002 by Australian lichenologist John Elix. The type specimen was collected in Nyika National Park at an altitude of 2,300 m (7,500 ft), where it was found growing on granite rocks. It is only known from the type locality. It contains usnic acid and stictic acid as major lichen products, and minor amounts of constictic acid, norstictic acid, cryptostictic acid, and lusitanic acid.

== See also ==
- List of Xanthoparmelia species
