= Diorygma nigricans =

Scientific classification
- Kingdom: Fungi
- Division: Ascomycota
- Class: Lecanoromycetes
- Order: Graphidales
- Family: Graphidaceae
- Genus: Diorygma
- Species: D. nigricans

Binomial name
- Diorygma nigricans Rivas Plata & Lücking (2012)
- Type locality:Los Amigos Biological Station, Peru

Species of lichen-forming fungus

Diorygma nigricans is a species of bark-dwelling, crustose lichen-forming fungus in the family Graphidaceae. It is a light green-gray lichen with distinctive wavy, densely branched, star-like fruiting bodies, known only from lowland tropical rainforest in Madre de Dios, Peru. The species was described in 2012 and is characterised by its large ascospores, each produced singly within the ascus.

== Taxonomy ==
Diorygma nigricans was described as a new species by Eimy Rivas Plata and Robert Lücking in 2012, based on material collected at Los Amigos Research and Training Center (CICRA) in Madre de Dios, Peru.

== Description ==
This species is a bark-dwelling crustose lichen with a light green-gray thallus that can reach about 5 cm (2 in) across and is 80–150 μm thick. The surface is uneven and lacks a cortex, and parts of the thallus may flake away. The photosynthetic partner (photobiont) is from the green algal genus Trentepohlia (cells 8–12 × 6–8 μm). The medulla is white and contains many clusters of calcium oxalate crystals, and the base includes a strongly carbonized (blackened) layer about 30–70 μm thick.

The fruiting bodies are lirellae that are flexuose, densely branched, and often arranged in star-like clusters. They are immersed, 0.5–3 mm long and 0.2–0.4 mm wide, with a thick white thalline margin. The exposed disc is brown-black and lacks pruina. Ascospores are single per ascus, ellipsoid, richly muriform, and measure 80–120 × 20–30 μm; they are colorless and iodine-positive (I+ violet-blue). Reported secondary metabolites include lichexanthone (UV+ yellow) and stictic and constictic acids as major substances, with cryptostictic, hypostictic, and hypoconstictic acids in smaller amounts.

== Habitat and distribution ==
The species is known from Amazonian Peru (Madre de Dios), where it was collected at about 270 m (890 ft) elevation in tropical lowland rainforest, growing on tree bark in secondary forest.
