= Diorygma africanum =

Scientific classification
- Kingdom: Fungi
- Division: Ascomycota
- Class: Lecanoromycetes
- Order: Graphidales
- Family: Graphidaceae
- Genus: Diorygma
- Species: D. africanum

Binomial name
- Diorygma africanum Kalb, Staiger & Elix (2004)

Species of lichen

Diorygma africanum is a species of corticolous (bark-dwelling) crustose lichen in the family Graphidaceae. It was described as new to science in 2004 by the lichenologists Klaus Kalb, Bettina Staiger, and John A. Elix, based on collections made in Cameroon. The species epithet alludes to its continent of origin, to which it was originally thought to be endemic, though it was later identified in Colombia. This bark-dwelling lichen forms thin grey crusts with conspicuous raised ridges that contain unusually large spores—each reproductive structure (ascus) typically holds just a single ascospore that can reach up to 200 micrometres in length. The species is distinguished from similar lichens by its unique chemical composition, particularly the presence of protocetraric acid and the absence of norstictic and salazinic acids.

== Taxonomy ==
Diorygma africanum was formally described in 2004 by Klaus Kalb, Bettina Staiger and John A. Elix. The holotype was collected in 1999 on the trunks and fallen branches of rainforest trees in the Campo Forest Reserve, South Province, Cameroon. The authors diagnosed the new species as the African analogue of D. reniforme but distinguished it by the absence of norstictic and salazinic acids and by its consistently larger, more robust reproductive structures. Subsequent collections—from the East and South Provinces and from Ocean District in south-western Cameroon—confirm that the species is chemically stable, producing protocetraric acid (sometimes with a trace of 4-O-methyl-hypoprotocetraric acid) and lacking the two aforementioned substances. Morphologically comparable taxa include D. pruinosa—which bears smaller spores and less conspicuous lirellae—and D. hololeucum, a south-east Asian species with only two to four spores per ascus.

== Description ==
The thallus forms a thin (50–100 μm), crust-like film that adheres tightly to bark and ranges in colour from creamy or light grey to dirty grey; occasional reddish patches result from prolonged moisture. Its surface is matt, uneven and often cracked into tiny island-like areoles. A true outer cortex is barely developed, and the photosynthetic partner—filaments of the green algal genus Trentepohlia—occupies a layer 25–30 μm thick beneath the surface. Below lies a loose, cottony medulla 30–50 μm deep, containing only scattered calcium oxalate crystals.

Reproductive bodies (lirellae) are conspicuously raised ridges 1.5–5 mm long that may flex or branch; older specimens sometimes have deep fissures separating the lirellae from the surrounding thallus. The open disc is broad and usually dusted with a whitish to pale-brown flour (pruina). Along the flanks a narrow band of orange-brown to blackened hyphae forms the exciple, whose fibres splay outward like the bristles of a brush. Inside, the spore-producing hymenium stands 160–200 μm tall and remains crystal-clear, though its upper third stains faint violet in iodine. Paraphyses—slender supportive threads—interweave to create a gelatinous mesh and terminate in short, swollen cells that darken as the asci mature. Each ascus contains a single large ascospore, colourless at first but soon divided by numerous cross-walls (septa) into a densely brick-walled (muriform) structure. Spores measure 140–200 μm in length and 40–65 μm in width, with smaller peripheral cells and a subtle bluish reaction in iodine. Minute flask-shaped pycnidia are occasionally present as low warts; they release rod-shaped conidia about 4.5 × 1 μm.

The species' chemical fingerprint is dominated by protocetraric acid, sometimes accompanied by trace amounts of 4-O-methyl-hypoprotocetraric acid. The absence of norstictic and salazinic acids is a reliable field test for separating D. africanum from its closest relative, D. reniforme.

Diorygma agumbense is another species that contains protocetraric acid, but it differs from D. africanum in several key characteristics. In particular, D. agumbense has asci that contain eight spores rather than the one to two spores typical of D. africanum, and it has a convergent, non-carbonized exciple instead of the distinctly divergent exciple found in D. africanum. Also, D. agumbense contains both protocetraric and stictic acids—a chemical combination that is unique within the genus—whereas D. africanum lacks stictic acid entirely.

== Habitat and distribution ==
Diorygma africanum was originally known only from Cameroon, where it has been located in three rainforest regions: the Campo Forest Reserve near the southern coastline, the Yokadouma area in the East Province, and low-elevation forests of Ocean District between Bipindi and Lolodorf. All collections were taken from the bark of mature, still-standing or freshly felled trees in relatively open, sun-flecked clearings at elevations of 60–700 m. In these areas, the lichen appears to tolerate periodic exposure to full sunlight yet still requires the humid microclimate of tropical lowland forest. The species was later reported as a member of the funga of the Chocó biogeographic region within the Valle del Cauca department of Colombia.
