= Xanthoparmelia simulans =

Scientific classification
- Kingdom: Fungi
- Division: Ascomycota
- Class: Lecanoromycetes
- Order: Lecanorales
- Family: Parmeliaceae
- Genus: Xanthoparmelia
- Species: X. simulans

Binomial name
- Xanthoparmelia simulans Hale (1986)

Species of lichen

Xanthoparmelia simulans is a species of terricolous (ground-dwelling), foliose lichen in the family Parmeliaceae. Found in Southern Africa, it was formally described as a new species in 1986 by the American lichenologist Mason Hale. The type specimen was collected by Hale in the Swartberg mountains, northwest of Cango Caves at an elevation of 1,800 m (5,900 ft). The lichen thallus, which is loosely attached to its soil substrate, is bright yellowish green and measures 5–8 cm (2.0–3.1 in) broad. It contains several lichen products: stictic, constictic, cryptostictic, usnic, and trace amounts of norstictic acid.

== See also ==
- List of Xanthoparmelia species
