= Diorygma sticticum =

Scientific classification
- Domain: Eukaryota
- Kingdom: Fungi
- Division: Ascomycota
- Class: Lecanoromycetes
- Order: Graphidales
- Family: Graphidaceae
- Genus: Diorygma
- Species: D. sticticum

Binomial name
- Diorygma sticticum Sutjar., Kalb & Lücking (2011)

Species of lichen-forming fungus

Diorygma sticticum is a species of corticolous (bark-dwelling) script lichen in the family Graphidaceae. It was described as new to science in 2011. It is found in lowland rainforests in Thailand, and in southwestern India.

== Taxonomy ==
Diorygma sticticum was first described as a new species by lichenologists Jutarat Sutjaritturakan, Klaus Kalb, and Robert Lücking in 2011. The type specimen was found in Khao Yai National Park in Nakhon Ratchasima province, Thailand. The species epithet, sticticum, refers to its unique secondary chemistry.

== Description ==
Diorygma sticticum has a corticolous thallus that can grow up to 5 cm (2 in) in diameter and is 70–150 μm thick. When viewed in cross-section, the thallus reveals an upper cortex measuring 10–15 μm thick, an uneven algal layer, and groups of calcium oxalate crystals. It has a smooth to uneven, light green surface, occasionally accompanied by a white prothallus. The species forms dense clusters of stellate lirellae, which range from 1–3 mm in length, 0.15–0.3 mm in width, and 0.1 mm in height. These lirellae have a distinct white thalline margin and a concealed to partly exposed, pale brown disc that is thickly white-pruinose. The colourless ascospores are 10–13 by 6–8 μm in size, with a strong I+ violet-blue reaction when stained with iodine.

The presence of stictic, hypostictic, and cryptostictic acids is a notable feature of Diorygma sticticum. These lichen products contribute to the species' distinctive characteristics and differentiate it from other lichens within its genus.

Diorygma sticticum is closely related to Diorygma microsporum, but it can be distinguished by its secondary chemistry and geographical distribution.

== Habitat and distribution ==
This lichen species has been found in several lowland rainforest locations in Thailand, including Khao Yai National Park in Nakhon Ratchasima province, Saraburi province, and Phu Luang Wildlife Sanctuary in Loei province. In 2020 it was reported from the Cotigao Wildlife Sanctuary in Goa, India.
