= Xanthoparmelia kosciuszkoensis =

Scientific classification
- Kingdom: Fungi
- Division: Ascomycota
- Class: Lecanoromycetes
- Order: Lecanorales
- Family: Parmeliaceae
- Genus: Xanthoparmelia
- Species: X. kosciuszkoensis

Binomial name
- Xanthoparmelia kosciuszkoensis Elix (2004)
- Holotype: Kosciuszko National Park, New South Wales

Species of lichen

Xanthoparmelia kosciuszkoensis is a species of foliose lichen in the family Parmeliaceae. Scientifically described in 2004, it is named after Kosciuszko National Park, where the type specimen was collected. The lichen forms a yellow-green leafy thallus up to 11 cm wide that grows on rocks in alpine areas across southeastern Australia. It can be identified by its irregular overlapping lobes, small rounded projections on its surface, black lower surface, and its distinctive chemical composition that includes salazinic acid and norstictic acid. The species occurs in scattered colonies throughout alpine regions of New South Wales, Victoria, Western Australia, and Tasmania, typically alongside other lichens. It can be distinguished from similar species like X. neotinctina by its rounded rather than cylindrical projections.

== Taxonomy ==
Xanthoparmelia kosciuszkoensis was described as a new species by the lichenologist John A. Elix in 2004. The type specimen was collected in Kosciuszko National Park, 2 km north of Smiggin Holes, New South Wales, Australia at an elevation of 1700 m. The species epithet kosciuszkoensis derives from the Latin suffix "-ensis" meaning "place of origin" and refers to Kosciuszko National Park, the locality of the type material.

== Description ==
The lichen forms a leafy (foliose) structure that is closely to loosely attached to its substrate surface, growing to 4–11 cm in width. Its lobes touch or overlap each other, are somewhat irregular in shape, branch irregularly, and measure 1–5 mm wide, developing narrow divisions (laciniae) along the edges and surface. The upper surface is yellow-green but quickly darkens to black, flat, dull in the center but shiny at lobe tips, developing irregular cracks and eventually breaking into small areas (areolate) in the center. The surface lacks powdery structures (soredia) and small lobes (lobules) but has small projections (isidiate). These projections (isidia) range from sparse to dense, are round to somewhat round, simple or rarely branching like coral, with blackened tips that have fused outer layers (syncorticate) to weakly separate outer layers (epicorticate) that remain intact rather than bursting open. The inner layer (medulla) is white, while the lower surface is black with dark brown at the tips. The root-like attachments (rhizines) are sparse to moderately dense, simple or clustered in tufts, and black.

Xanthoparmelia kosciuszkoensis is characterised by the foliose thallus, the black lower surface, the globose to subglobose isidia with blackened, syncorticate to weakly epicorticate apices, and its medullary chemistry. It contains usnic acid (minor), salazinic acid (major), norstictic acid (submajor or minor), consalazinic acid (trace), and protocetraric acid (trace). It can be distinguished from the morphologically and chemically similar X. neotinctina by the latter's slender, cylindrical isidia which become densely branched and coralloid, and its shorter ascospores.

== Habitat and distribution ==
Xanthoparmelia kosciuszkoensis occurs in scattered colonies in alpine areas of southeastern New South Wales and southern Victoria, in cooler areas of southwestern Western Australia, and in Tasmania. Common associated lichens include Menegazzia platytrema, Parmelia signifera, Parmelina labrosa, Rhizocarpon geographicum, Ramboldia petraeoides and various other species of Xanthoparmelia.

== See also ==
- List of Xanthoparmelia species
