= Diorygma microsporum =

Scientific classification
- Domain: Eukaryota
- Kingdom: Fungi
- Division: Ascomycota
- Class: Lecanoromycetes
- Order: Graphidales
- Family: Graphidaceae
- Genus: Diorygma
- Species: D. microsporum

Binomial name
- Diorygma microsporum M.Cáceres & Lücking (2011)

Species of lichen

Diorygma microsporum is a species of corticolous (bark-dwelling) crustose lichen in the family Graphidaceae. It was described as new to science in 2011. It has a neotropical distribution, and has been collected in Florida, Colombia, Brazil, and India. Notable for its small ascospores, this lichen thrives in undisturbed rainforests and serves as an indicator of forest health.

== Taxonomy ==
Diorygma microsporum was first described by lichenologists Marcela Cáceres and Robert Lücking as a new species in 2011. The species epithet microsporum highlights its quite small ascospores, which are the smallest known in the genus Diorygma. The type specimen was discovered by the authors in the Charles Darwin Ecological Refuge in Igarassu, Pernambuco, Brazil.

Initially, the newly discovered species was identified as Anomomorpha aggregans due to its small ascospores and norstictic acid chemistry. However, further examination and DNA sequencing of a Florida collection revealed a lack of hymenial inspersion, a key character in Anomomorpha. The morphology of D. microsporum is more reminiscent of species within the genus Diorygma, confirming its placement within the genus and setting it apart from similar species.

== Description ==
Diorygma microsporum has a crustose thallus that can reach up to 5 cm (2 in) in diameter and has a thickness of 50–120 μm. Its surface is smooth to uneven and has a light greyish-green colour. The lichen features dense clusters of stellately (star-like) branched lirellae, measuring 1–5 mm long, 0.15–0.25 mm wide, and 0.1 mm high. The disc is partly exposed, with a flesh-coloured to light red-brown hue and covered in white pruina. Its excipulum is orange-brown and 15–25 μm thick. The ascospores are ellipsoid, measure 12–15 by 6–7 μm in size, and strongly iodine-reactive. It contains norstictic acid as its sole lichen product.

=== Similar species ===
Diorygma microsporum shares some similarities with D. poitaei in appearance; however, it is distinguished by its smaller ascospores and the presence of norstictic acid in its thallus. Another one of the few species with small spores, Diorygma cameroonense, is distinguished from D. microsporum by its chemistry, as it contains stictic acid and constictic acid as major lichen products.

== Habitat and distribution ==
Diorygma microsporum has a relatively broad neotropical distribution, as evidenced by collections from northeastern Brazil, Colombia, and Florida. It has also been recorded in Tamil Nadu, India. This lichen species is typically found on tree trunks in the shady understory of undisturbed lowland and lower montane rainforests, making it a bioindicator of forest health.
