= Diorygma minisporum =

Scientific classification
- Domain: Eukaryota
- Kingdom: Fungi
- Division: Ascomycota
- Class: Lecanoromycetes
- Order: Graphidales
- Family: Graphidaceae
- Genus: Diorygma
- Species: D. minisporum

Binomial name
- Diorygma minisporum Kalb, Staiger & Elix (2004)

Species of lichen

Diorygma minisporum is a little-known species of corticolous (bark-dwelling) crustose lichen in the family Graphidaceae. Known only from its original collection site in Petén, Guatemala, it was described as new to science in 2004 by the lichenologists Klaus Kalb, Bettina Staiger, and John A. Elix. Its species epithet refers to its relatively small ascospores (compared to other species in the genus with some otherwise similar features), which number eight per ascus and measure 17–20 by 5–6.5 micrometres. The lichen contains hypostictic, hypoconstictic, stictic and constictic acids as major secondary metabolites (lichen products).
