= Diorygma salazinicum =

Scientific classification
- Domain: Eukaryota
- Kingdom: Fungi
- Division: Ascomycota
- Class: Lecanoromycetes
- Order: Graphidales
- Family: Graphidaceae
- Genus: Diorygma
- Species: D. salazinicum

Binomial name
- Diorygma salazinicum Sutjar. & Kalb (2014)

Species of lichen

Diorygma salazinicum is a rare species of lichen in the family Graphidaceae. Found in Thailand, it was formally described as a new species in 2014 by Jutarat Sutjaritturakan and Klaus Kalb. The type specimen was collected in Tambon Wangmai (Thai Mueang District), where it was found growing on the bark of an unidentified deciduous tree. The lichen is only known from the type locality. The specific epithet refers to the presence of salazinic acid, a secondary chemical. Other compounds occurring in the lichen are stictic acid, minor amounts of cryptostictic acid and peristictic acid, as well as trace amounts of norstictic acid.
