= Xanthoparmelia indumenica =

Scientific classification
- Kingdom: Fungi
- Division: Ascomycota
- Class: Lecanoromycetes
- Order: Lecanorales
- Family: Parmeliaceae
- Genus: Xanthoparmelia
- Species: X. indumenica

Binomial name
- Xanthoparmelia indumenica Hale (1986)

Species of lichen

Xanthoparmelia indumenica is a species of saxicolous (rock-dwelling), foliose lichen in the family Parmeliaceae. Found in South Africa, it was formally described as a new species in 1986 by the American lichenologist Mason Hale. The type specimen was collected from Cathedral Peak on Rainbow Gorge (KwaZulu-Natal) at an elevation of 1,600 m (5,200 ft), where it was found growing on a sandstone boulder. The lichen has a yellowish-green thallus (darker green towards the center) that is 4–5 cm (1.6–2.0 in) broad. It contains several secondary metabolites (lichen products): protocetraric acid, stictic acid, constictic acid, and usnic acid.

== See also ==
- List of Xanthoparmelia species
