= Xanthoparmelia somervilleae =

Scientific classification
- Kingdom: Fungi
- Division: Ascomycota
- Class: Lecanoromycetes
- Order: Lecanorales
- Family: Parmeliaceae
- Genus: Xanthoparmelia
- Species: X. somervilleae

Binomial name
- Xanthoparmelia somervilleae Elix & Kantvilas (2009)
- Holotype site: Gunners Quoin, Tasmania

Species of lichen

Xanthoparmelia somervilleae is a species of saxicolous (rock-dwelling), foliose lichen in the family Parmeliaceae. It is found in Tasmania, Australia.

== Taxonomy ==
The lichen was formally described by the Australian lichenologists John Alan Elix and Gintaras Kantvilas in 2009. The type specimen was collected by the authors from Gunners Quoin (Tasmania), where it was found in an open Eucalyptus woodland growing on dolerite rocks. The species epithet honours Janet Sommerville (1887–1969), who was a Tasmanian botanist, historian, and naturalist.

== Description ==
Characteristics of the lichen include the isidia on the upper thallus surface and a black undersurface, as well as the presence of several lichen products in the medulla: norstictic acid, hyposalazinic acid, hypostictic acid, and connorstictic acid. Its thallus, which has a loosely adnate to adnate attachment to its substrate, grows 4–10 cm across and comprises overlapping to contiguous lobes that are 1.0–2.5 mm wide. The upper thallus is yellowish-green, somewhat shiny, wrinkled, and flat. The apothecia measure 1–5 wide, and have brown to dark brown discs that are initially concave before becoming convex. The ascospores are ellipsoid and measure 9–11 by 5–6 μm.

== Habitat, distribution, and ecology ==
Xanthoparmelia somervilleae occurs in scattered locations throughout Tasmania, growing on rocks in dry, sun-exposed sclerophyll forests. Substrates include dolerite, conglomerate, and sandstone. It often grows in association with other lichens, including Paraporpidia leptocarpa, Ramboldia petraeoides, Rhizocarpon geographicum, Tephromela atra, and other Xanthoparmelia species, such as X. dichotoma, X. neotinctina, X. subprolixa, X. tasmanica, and X. vicaria.

== See also ==
- List of Xanthoparmelia species
