= Diorygma salvadoriense =

Scientific classification
- Domain: Eukaryota
- Kingdom: Fungi
- Division: Ascomycota
- Class: Lecanoromycetes
- Order: Graphidales
- Family: Graphidaceae
- Genus: Diorygma
- Species: D. salvadoriense

Binomial name
- Diorygma salvadoriense Kalb, Staiger & Elix (2004)

Species of lichen

Diorygma salvadoriense is a species of corticolous (bark-dwelling) crustose lichen in the family Graphidaceae. Found in El Salvador, it was described as new to science in 2004 by the lichenologists Klaus Kalb, Bettina Staiger, and John A. Elix. The lichen forms a whitish to grey to greenish-grey thallus with a rough and matt surface that often overgrows adjacent lichens and mosses. It contains norstictic and salazinic acid as major secondary metabolites (lichen products).
