= Diorygma fuscum =

Scientific classification
- Domain: Eukaryota
- Kingdom: Fungi
- Division: Ascomycota
- Class: Lecanoromycetes
- Order: Graphidales
- Family: Graphidaceae
- Genus: Diorygma
- Species: D. fuscum

Binomial name
- Diorygma fuscum Jian Li bis & Z.F.Jia (2016)

Species of lichen

Diorygma fuscum is a species of corticolous (bark-dwelling) crustose lichen in the family Graphidaceae. It forms thin, pale grey crusts on bark surfaces and produces distinctive slit-like reproductive structures that are dusted with white powder (pruina). The lichen reproduces through ascospores that have a brick-like internal structure with multiple compartments, and it contains several lichen substances that help distinguish it from related species. The species was first scientifically described in 2016 from specimens collected in Fujian Province. Diorygma fuscum is known only from low-elevation primary forests in China, where it grows alongside other bark-dwelling lichens.

== Taxonomy ==
Diorygma fuscum was described in 2016 by Jian Li and Ze-Feng Jia on the basis of material collected from bark in low-elevation forests at Wanmulin, Fujian, China. The epithet fuscum refers to the brownish tone assumed by the mature, many-celled spores. Morphologically the species falls squarely within Diorygma—it has lirellate, white-pruinose apothecia and Graphis-type asci—but it differs from its closest ally D. pruinosum by having smaller spores (40–60 × 12–18 μm vs 95–170 × 19–50 μm), eight rather than one spore per ascus, and by containing stictic-series compounds instead of protocetraric acid. Chemical profiles likewise set it apart from D. erythrellum and D. poitaei, which share 8-spored asci but differ in their secondary metabolite suites and degree of exciple carbonisation.

== Description ==
The thallus forms a thin (60–100 μm), pale grey to olive-grey crust that adheres closely to bark. Its surface is uneven to faintly warty and lacks powdery or finger-like propagules. A poorly developed pseudocortex only 5–10 μm thick overlies a 30–40 μm algal layer composed of green Trebouxia-type cells; below this, the medulla is sparse. Apothecia are abundant, appearing as flexuous, often branched slits (lirellae) 1–4 mm long that begin immersed but later burst open and rise slightly above the thallus. Their discs are thickly dusted with a white powder (pruina), and ageing fruit-bodies frequently crack along the disc surface. The lateral wall (exciple) remains pale or only weakly brown and is largely uncarbonised except at the base. The spore-bearing hymenium, 100–180 μm tall, is iodine-positive (bluish violet), and its cap (epithecium) is well developed, consisting of tangled paraphysis tips rich in gelatinous walls. Paraphyses are 1–2 μm wide, repeatedly branch and re-join, and tend to stick together near the ascus tips. Each club-shaped ascus produces eight colourless to pale-brown, densely muriform ascospores with 10–14 transverse and 3–4 longitudinal walls; a thin gelatinous halo surrounds each spore. No asexual pycnidia have been observed. Chemically, the lichen contains stictic acid as a major metabolite together with minor or trace amounts of constictic, hypostictic, and hypoconstictic acids, and it shows no colour reactions in standard spot tests.

== Habitat and distribution ==
Diorygma fuscum is known to occur only in subtropical south-eastern China, where it inhabits the bark of trees in relatively dry, open pockets of lowland primary forest at 300–540 m elevation. Collections from Wanmulin (Fujian Province) indicate that it co-occurs with various other script lichens such as Graphis hossei and members of Lecanora and the Graphidaceae, suggesting a preference for lightly shaded trunks that experience regular air movement. Until further surveys are conducted in neighbouring provinces and countries, the authors suggest that the species should be regarded as a regional endemic of subtropical East Asia. Diorygma fuscum is one of ten species of Diorygma known to occur in China.
