= Diorygma cameroonense =

Scientific classification
- Kingdom: Fungi
- Division: Ascomycota
- Class: Lecanoromycetes
- Order: Graphidales
- Family: Graphidaceae
- Genus: Diorygma
- Species: D. cameroonense

Binomial name
- Diorygma cameroonense Kalb (2020)

Species of lichen

Diorygma cameroonense is a little-known species of corticolous (bark-dwelling) script lichen in the family Graphidaceae. It is found in the pristine rainforests of eastern Cameroon. This lichen is distinct due to its larger ascospores with more septa compared to the closely related Diorygma sticticum.

== Taxonomy ==
Diorygma cameroonense was formally described as a new species in 2020 by German lichenologist Klaus Kalb. The species name, cameroonense, refers to the country where it was collected. The type specimen was collected on 1 April 1999 in Bewala II Village near Ngatto, East Province, Cameroon, in a pristine rainforest along the Boumba River.

== Description ==
The thallus of Diorygma cameroonense is corticolous, greenish-grey, and can reach up to 10 cm (4 in) in diameter. It has a smooth to uneven surface and is 100–125 μm thick. The lichen's fruit bodies are in the form of lirellae, which are single, unbranched or stellately to irregularly branched, and immersed to erumpent with a thick, complete thalline margin. Ascospores are ellipsoid and somewhat muriform, measuring 15–20 by 5–8 μm, with 3–5 transverse and 0–1 longitudinal septa in 1 or 2 segments.

The lichen contains three lichen products: stictic acid (major), menegazziaic acid (minor), and constictic acid (submajor).

=== Similar species ===
Diorygma cameroonense is part of the genus Diorygma, which includes other species with small ascospores, such as D. microsporum from Brazil, Colombia, and the United States (Florida); D. pauciseptatum from Brazil; and D. sticticum from Thailand. Diorygma cameroonense is distinguished from these species by its larger and more septate ascospores, as well as its unique chemistry.

== Habitat and distribution ==
Diorygma cameroonense is found in Cameroon, specifically in the East Province. It grows on the bark of trees in pristine rainforests along the Boumba River at an elevation of about 600 m (2,000 ft).
