= Xanthoparmelia subcrustosa =

Scientific classification
- Kingdom: Fungi
- Division: Ascomycota
- Class: Lecanoromycetes
- Order: Lecanorales
- Family: Parmeliaceae
- Genus: Xanthoparmelia
- Species: X. subcrustosa

Binomial name
- Xanthoparmelia subcrustosa Hale (1986)

Species of lichen

Xanthoparmelia subcrustosa is a species of saxicolous (rock-dwelling), foliose lichen in the family Parmeliaceae. Found in South Africa, it was formally described as a new species in 1986 by the American lichenologist Mason Hale. The type specimen was collected by Hale from Cape Province at an elevation of 900 m (3,000 ft), where he found it growing on granite boulders in karoo vegetation. The thallus of the lichen, which is tightly attached to its rock substrate, is described as "subcrustose" (almost-crust-like), and this trait is referenced in its species epithet. It is pale yellowish green in color and measures 2–3 cm (0.8–1.2 in) broad. Although there are other subcrustose lichen in genus Xanthoparmelia, X. subcrustosa has a unique secondary metabolite (lichen product) complement, containing salazinic, norstictic, connorstictic, and usnic acids.

== See also ==
- List of Xanthoparmelia species
