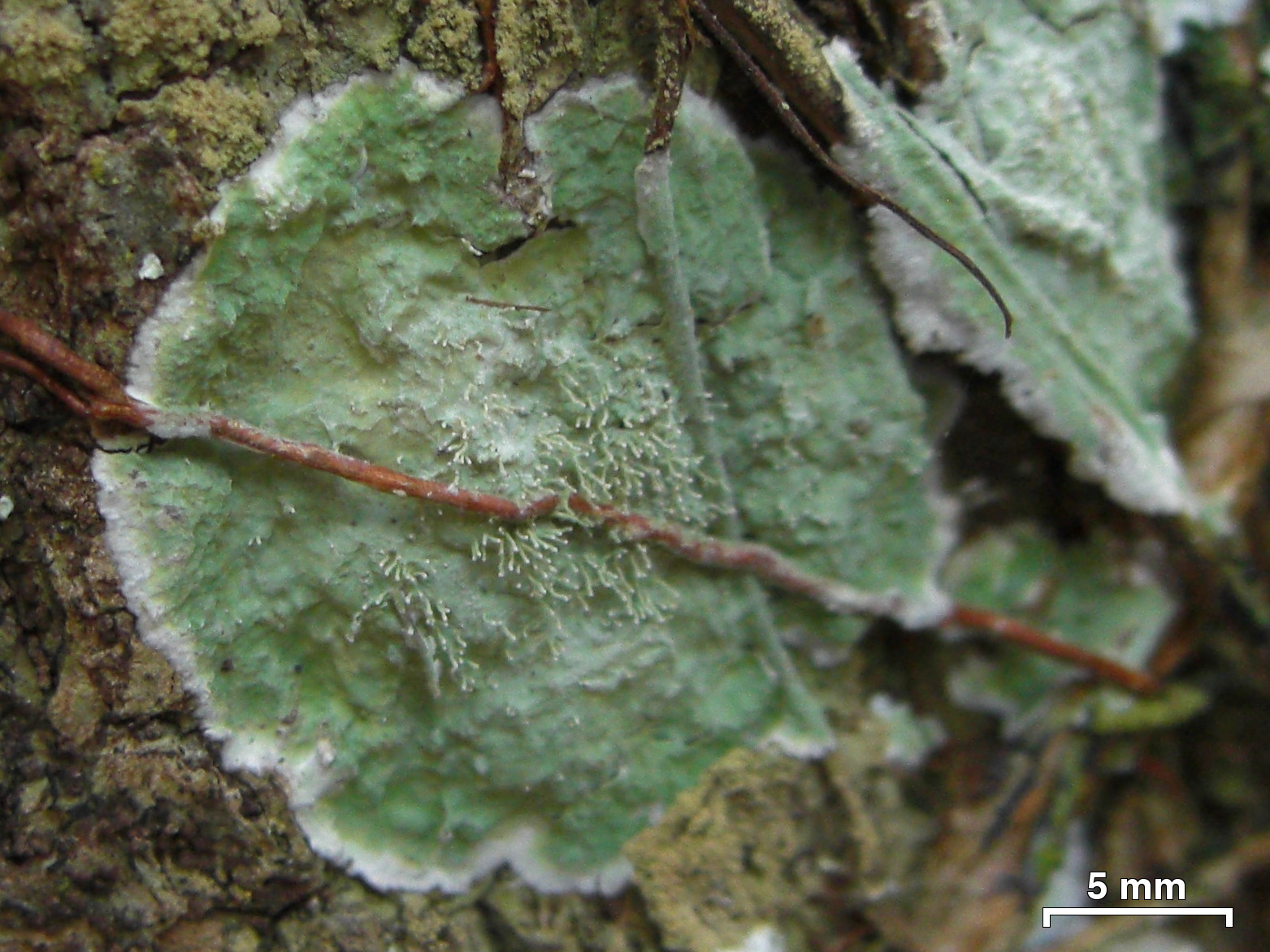
- in Fakahatchee Strand, Florida, USA

Scientific classification
- Domain: Eukaryota
- Kingdom: Fungi
- Division: Ascomycota
- Class: Lecanoromycetes
- Order: Graphidales
- Family: Graphidaceae
- Genus: Diorygma
- Species: D. antillarum

Binomial name
- Diorygma antillarum (Vain.) Nelsen, Lücking & Rivas Plata (2012)

Synonyms
- Chiodecton antillarum Vain. (1915); Herpothallon antillarum (Vain.) Aptroot, Lücking & G.Thor (2009)

= Diorygma antillarum =

Species of lichen

Diorygma antillarum is a species of corticolous (bark-dwelling), crustose lichen in the family Graphidaceae. It is common and widespread in the Neotropical realm, primarily found on trees in the shady understory and in slightly illuminated habitats of lowland to montane rainforests. It produces norstictic acid and salazinic acid.

== Taxonomy ==
The lichen was first formally described as a new species in 1915 by the Finnish lichenologist Edvard August Vainio, who initially classified it in the genus Chiodecton. The type specimen was collected in 1803 by the American botanist Stephen Elliott from the Laudat Mountain in the Lesser Antilles (now Dominica) at an elevation of 1,700 m (5,600 ft). André Aptroot, Robert Lücking, and Göran Thor proposed a transfer to Herpothallon when they resurrected that genus in 2009.

The genus Herpothallon typically includes crustose-byssoid species with a heteromerous thallus and isidia-like structures. These structures, while superficially resembling true isidia, lack cortices and thus referred to as isidia-like. Herpothallon species are mostly sterile, with mature asci known from only a few taxa. Molecular data has shown that H. antillarum does not align closely with the type species of Herpothallon (H. rubrocinctum) in the family Arthoniaceae. Instead, H. antillarum is closely related to species within the genus Diorygma (Graphidaceae). The presence of a carbonised, fragile hypothallus in H. antillarum, a feature common in Diorygma species, along with its production of salazinic and norstictic acids, supports this reclassification. These chemical compounds are not typical for Herpothallon but are found in Diorygma. Further phylogenetic analyses confirmed that H. antillarum belongs to the Graphidaceae, specifically within the subfamily Graphidoideae. For these reasons, Matthew Nelsen, Lücking, and Eimy Rivas Plata transferred the taxon to Diorygma in 2012.
