= Diorygma tocantinsense =

Scientific classification
- Kingdom: Fungi
- Division: Ascomycota
- Class: Lecanoromycetes
- Order: Graphidales
- Family: Graphidaceae
- Genus: Diorygma
- Species: D. tocantinsense

Binomial name
- Diorygma tocantinsense S.C.Feuerst., I.P.R.Cunha, Aptroot (2014)
- Holotype: Itaguatins, Brazil

Species of lichen

Diorygma tocantinsense is a species of corticolous (bark-dwelling) lichen in the family Graphidaceae. Found in Brazil, it was formally described as new to science in 2014 by the lichenologists Shirley Feuerstein, Iane Cunha, and André Aptroot. The type specimen was collected by Feuerstein from Fazenda São Paulo (Itaguatins, state of Tocantins), where it was found growing on tree bark. The lichen has an opaque, irregular, whitish-cream thallus that lacks soredia and isidia. It is characterised from other Diorygma species by its ascospores, which measure 24–40 by 10–15 μm and are muriform (divided into multiple compartments by both longitudinal and transverse septa); most species in the genus have considerably larger spores. Additionally, this species contains protocetraric acid, a lichen product that can be detected using thin-layer chromatography. Its positive spot test reactions are K+ (deep yellow) and P+ (orange).
