= Diorygma pauciseptatum =

Scientific classification
- Domain: Eukaryota
- Kingdom: Fungi
- Division: Ascomycota
- Class: Lecanoromycetes
- Order: Graphidales
- Family: Graphidaceae
- Genus: Diorygma
- Species: D. pauciseptatum

Binomial name
- Diorygma pauciseptatum S.C.Feuerst., I.P.R.Cunha, Aptroot & M.Cáceres (2014)

Species of lichen

Diorygma pauciseptatum is a species of corticolous (bark-dwelling) lichen in the family Graphidaceae. Found in Brazil, it was formally described as new to science in 2014 as a collaborative effort by several lichenologists: Shirley Feuerstein, Iane Cunha, André Aptroot, and Marcela Cáceres. The type specimen was collected by the first author from Fazenda São Paulo (Itaguatins, state of Tocantins), where it was found growing on tree bark. The lichen has an opaque, irregular, yellowish-green thallus that lacks soredia and isidia. It is characterised from other Diorygma species by its ascospores, which measure 28–32 by 7 μm and have from 7 to 9 transverse septa; this species has ascospores with the fewest septa in the genus. Additionally, this species contains norstictic and connorstictic acids, which are lichen products that can be detected using thin-layer chromatography.
