= Diorygma incantatum =

Scientific classification
- Domain: Eukaryota
- Kingdom: Fungi
- Division: Ascomycota
- Class: Lecanoromycetes
- Order: Graphidales
- Family: Graphidaceae
- Genus: Diorygma
- Species: D. incantatum

Binomial name
- Diorygma incantatum S.C.Feuerst. & Eliasaro (2014)

Species of lichen

Diorygma incantatum is a species of corticolous (bark-dwelling) crustose lichen in the family Graphidaceae. It is found in northern and southern Brazil.

== Taxonomy ==
The lichen was formally described as new to science in 2014 by Shirley Cunha Feuerstein and Sionara Eliasaro. The type specimen was collected by the first author in the Encantadas of Ilha do Mel State Park (Paraná), where it was found growing on tree bark in a Restinga forest. The species epithet incantatum (Latin for "enchanted") alludes to the type locality, Encantadas (Portuguese for "enchanted"), which refers to this area on the Ilha do Mel. The range of the species was later extended to northern Brazil when, in 2017, it was recorded near Itaguatins in the state of Tocantins.

== Description ==
Diorygma incantatum grows as an opaque, irregular, whitish grey crust on the bark substrate. It lacks soredia and isidia (vegetative propagules). Its ascomata are white, have a rounded to irregular shape, and measure 0.6–1.6 by 0.3–0.6 mm; they have a pinkish disc with white pruina. The major distinguishing characteristic of the lichen are its threadlike (filiform) ascospores, which measure 105–108 by 6 μm and have from 29 to 31 transverse septa.

At the time of publication, only four other Diorygma species were known to have transverse septa in their ascospores. These lichens (D. circumfusum, D. minisporum, D. wallamanense, and D. wilsonianum ) can be distinguished from D. incantatum by differences in distribution and in spore dimensions and structure. Additionally, D. incantatum contains an unknown lichen product that forms a purple spot when analysed and separated with thin-layer chromatography; this spot will fluoresce orange when lit with an ultraviolet light. The authors also noted a resemblance with Chapsa indica, a species which differs from D. incantatum in that it contains periphysoids, and it lacks lichen products.
