= Xanthoparmelia globisidiosa =

Scientific classification
- Kingdom: Fungi
- Division: Ascomycota
- Class: Lecanoromycetes
- Order: Lecanorales
- Family: Parmeliaceae
- Genus: Xanthoparmelia
- Species: X. globisidiosa

Binomial name
- Xanthoparmelia globisidiosa Hale (1986)

Species of lichen

Xanthoparmelia globisidiosa is a species of saxicolous (rock-dwelling), foliose lichen in the family Parmeliaceae. Found in Southern Africa, it was formally described as a new species in 1986 by the American lichenologist Mason Hale. The type specimen was collected from Cape Province at an elevation of about 300 m (980 ft), where it was found growing on large sandstone boulders in a pasture. The lichen has a light yellowish-green thallus that measures 4–8 cm (1.6–3.1 in) broad, comprising short, overlapping lobes that are 1–2 mm wide. It contains stictic acid, constictic acid, and usnic acid.

== See also ==
- List of Xanthoparmelia species
