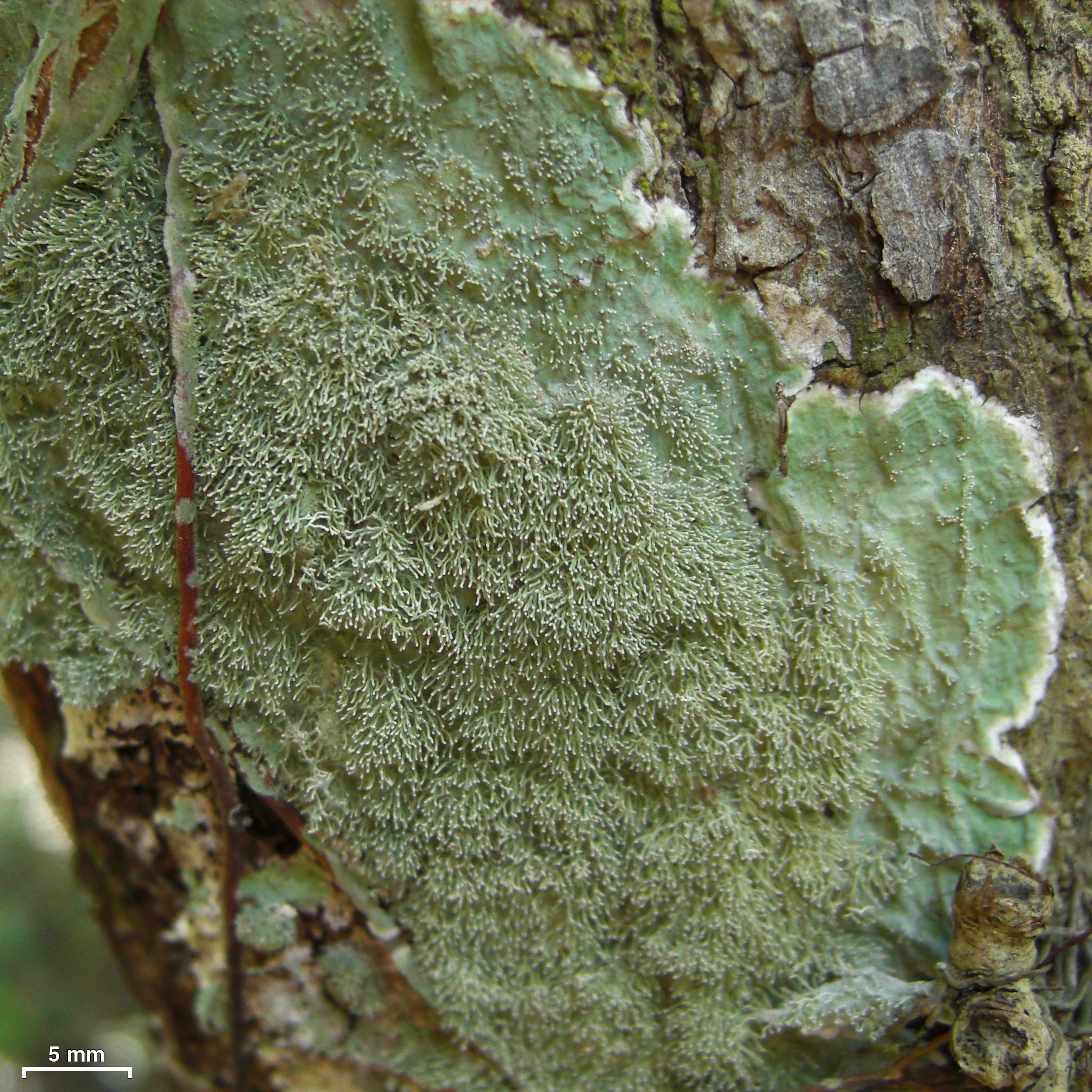
- Diorygma antillarum found in Fakahatchee Strand Preserve State Park, Florida

Scientific classification
- Kingdom: Fungi
- Division: Ascomycota
- Class: Lecanoromycetes
- Order: Graphidales
- Family: Graphidaceae
- Genus: Diorygma; Eschw. (1824)

Type species
- Diorygma tinctorium Eschw. (1824)

Species
- See text

Synonyms
- Cyclographina D.D.Awasthi (1979)

= Diorygma =

Genus of lichens

Diorygma is a genus of lichen-forming fungi in the family Graphidaceae. The genus was circumscribed by Franz Gerhard Eschweiler in 1824. Species of the genus are widely distributed in tropical and subtropical regions of the world. These lichens form paint-like crusts on bark and rock that range from chalky white to light green, with elongated, pencil-like slits containing their spores that may flex and branch across the surface. The genus was established in 1824 for tropical script lichens with large, many-celled spores, but molecular studies in the 2000s and 2010s expanded it significantly by transferring species from other genera and revealing new diversity.

== Taxonomy ==
The name Diorygma was coined by Franz Gerhard Eschweiler in 1824 for a group of neotropical script lichens in the family Graphidaceae that have large, many-celled (muriform) spores and a thin, naked hymenium. Elias Fries accepted the genus in 1825—likening it to what is now Arthonia—but made no additional combinations. Eschweiler himself broadened the concept in 1833 by adding several species that subsequent work has reassigned to Fissurina and Platythecium. Towards the end of the nineteenth century, Johannes Müller Argoviensis erected the genus Graphina for muriform-spored taxa, retaining a handful of Diorygma species within his sections Platygraphina and Platygrammina, thereby narrowing the scope of Eschweiler's original taxon.

Interest in the group revived in the twentieth century. Dharani Dhar Awasthi and Mamta Joshi, while revising Helminthocarpon in 1979, recognised that these lirellate lichens formed a discrete lineage, but instead of resurrecting Eschweiler's name they introduced Cyclographina. In a comprehensive monograph of 2002, Bettina Staiger restored Diorygma for this assemblage and, on the basis of its rather unusual tissue organisation, suggested that it might fall outside the core Graphidaceae. Subsequent molecular analyses have confirmed that Diorygma does indeed belong within that family and have expanded its limits to include species with either single-spored, muriform asci or with spores divided only by transverse walls.

== Description ==
Species of Diorygma form a crustose (tightly adherent, paint-like) thallus that ranges in hue from chalky white or cream to light olive-grey or green. The surface is generally dull and may be uneven, slightly wrinkled, or minutely warted; fine cracks are common. Unlike many other script lichens, the thallus lacks special powdery propagules (soralia or isidia). A true outer "skin" (pseudocortex) is poorly developed or absent, while the interior medulla is white and often riddled with conspicuous crystal deposits. The embedded partner alga is Trentepohlia, a filamentous green alga that imparts a faint orange tinge when exposed.

The sexual fruit-bodies are lirellae—elongate, pencil-like slits that may flex and branch across the thallus. Their margins can be thick and swollen or remain almost flush with the surface, and the exposed disc is usually brown, sometimes dusted with a whitish or yellowish bloom (pruina). Internally, the lateral wall (exciple) may be pale or blackened ("carbonised") and often shows fine striations produced by repeated regrowth events. The hymenium—the spore-producing layer—is clear and oil-free but stains bluish-violet in iodine at its upper and outer portions. At its roof lies a tangle of gelatinous, net-like paraphyses that carry nodular tips and brown or colourless granules. Club-shaped asci have the so-called "Graphis-type" apex with a thickened inner cap, and they bear one to eight colourless ascospores. These spores are oblong with rounded ends, occasionally spindle-shaped, and show transverse walls (sometimes with additional vertical walls to give a brick-like, muriform pattern); they measure roughly 15–250 × 5–60 μm and may turn blue-violet in iodine.

Asexual reproduction is rare and takes place in tiny pycnidia embedded in wart-like swellings about 0.1 mm across. These structures release minute, sausage-shaped to rod-shaped conidia 3.5–6 × 1–1.5 μm. Chemically, most species contain compounds of the norstictic or stictic acid families, while others produce protocetraric-series substances—secondary metabolites that can aid in species identification through chemical spot tests and thin-layer chromatography.

== Species ==
As of June 2025, Species Fungorum accepts 80 species of Diorygma.

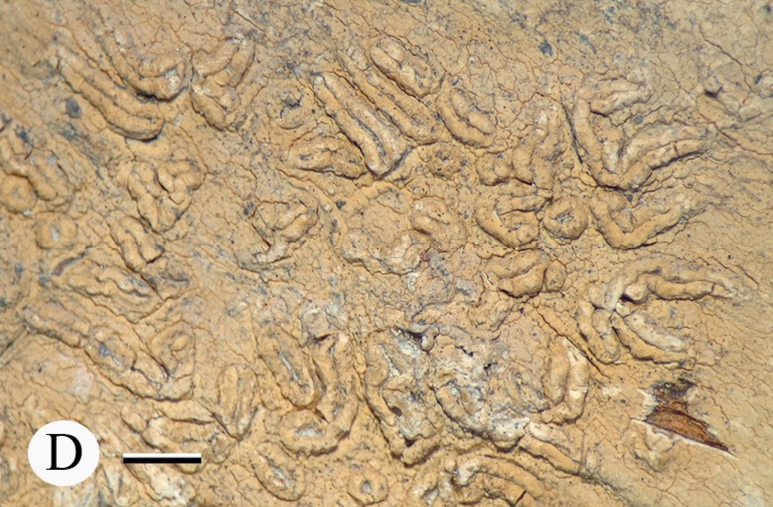
Type specimen of Diorygma isabellinum

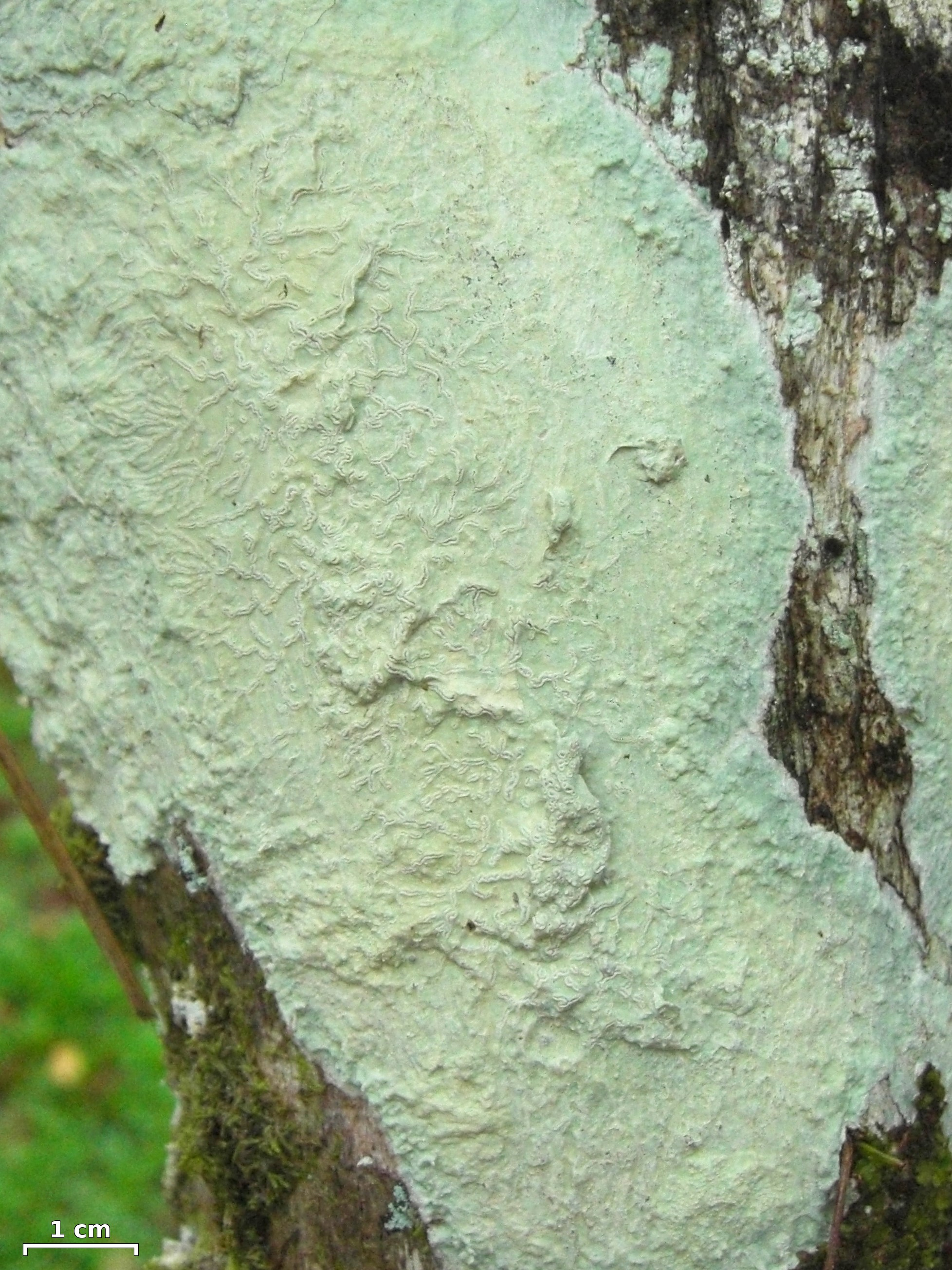
Diorygma poitaei, Amazon, Peru

- Diorygma aeolum (Stirt.) Pushpi Singh & Kr.P.Singh (2017)
- Diorygma africanum Kalb, Staiger & Elix (2004)
- Diorygma agumbense B.O.Sharma & Khadilkar (2012) – India
- Diorygma alagoense M.Cáceres & Lücking (2007) – Brazil
- Diorygma albocinerascens Makhija, Chitale & B.O.Sharma (2009) – India
- Diorygma albovirescens Makhija, Chitale & B.O.Sharma (2009) – India
- Diorygma angusticarpum Sutjar. & Kalb (2014) – Thailand
- Diorygma antillarum (Vain.) Nelsen, Lücking & Rivas Plata (2012)
- Diorygma archeri S.Joshi & Hur (2013) – Vietnam
- Diorygma australasicum (Elix) Lücking, Elix & A.W.Archer (2009)
- Diorygma basinigrum Seavey & J.Seavey (2014)
- Diorygma cameroonense Kalb (2020) – Africa
- Diorygma chumphonense Sutjar. & Kalb (2014) – Thailand
- Diorygma circumfusum (Stirt.) Kalb, Staiger & Elix (2004)
- Diorygma citri Sutjar. & Kalb (2014) – Thailand
- Diorygma confluens (Fée) Kalb, Staiger & Elix (2004)
- Diorygma conprotocetraricum Sutjar. & Kalb (2014) – Thailand
- Diorygma dandeliense B.O.Sharma & Khadilkar (2012) – India
- Diorygma dealbatum B.O.Sharma & Makhija (2009) – India
- Diorygma defectoisidiatum Aptroot & M.Cáceres (2023) – Brazil
- Diorygma epiglaucum (Müll.Arg.) Kalb, Staiger & Elix (2004)
- Diorygma erythrellum (Mont. & Bosch) Kalb, Staiger & Elix (2004)
- Diorygma excipuloconvergentum Makhija, Chitale & B.O.Sharma (2009) – India
- Diorygma extensum Sipman (2014)
- Diorygma fuscopruinosum Sutjar. & Kalb (2014) – Thailand
- Diorygma fuscum Jian Li bis & Z.F.Jia (2016) – China
- Diorygma guizhouense Wei Wu & S.B.Fu (2025) – China
- Diorygma gyrosum Aptroot, Lücking & M.Cáceres (2023) – Brazil
- Diorygma hieroglyphicellum Sutjar. & Kalb (2014) – Thailand
- Diorygma hieroglyphicum (Pers.) Staiger & Kalb (2004)
- Diorygma hololeucum (Mont. & Bosch) Kalb, Staiger & Elix (2004)
- Diorygma hydei Wei Wu & S.B.Fu (2025) – China
- Diorygma inaequale B.O.Sharma & Makhija (2009) – India
- Diorygma incantatum S.C.Feuerst. & Eliasaro (2014) – Brazil
- Diorygma inexpectatum Sutjar. & Kalb (2013) – Thailand
- Diorygma intermedium Kalb, Staiger & Elix (2004)
- Diorygma isabellinum (Zahlbr.) Z.F.Jia & Lücking (2017)
- Diorygma isidiolichexanthonicum Aptroot (2020) – Brazil
- Diorygma junghuhnii (Mont. & Bosch) Kalb, Staiger & Elix (2004)
- Diorygma karnatakense B.O.Sharma & Khadilkar (2012) – India
- Diorygma kurnoolense Mohabe, Nayaka & A.M.Reddy (2015) – India
- Diorygma leigongshanense Wei Wu & S.B.Fu (2025) – China
- Diorygma lichexanthonicum Aptroot, Lücking & M.Cáceres (2023) – Brazil
- Diorygma locitonitrum Wei Wu & S.B.Fu (2025) – China
- Diorygma longilirellatum B.O.Sharma & Makhija (2009) – India
- Diorygma longisporum E.L.Lima, M.Cáceres & Aptroot (2013) – Brazil
- Diorygma macgregorii (Vain.) Kalb, Staiger & Elix (2004)
- Diorygma manipurense B.O.Sharma & Makhija (2009) – India
- Diorygma megaspermum Makhija, Chitale & B.O.Sharma (2009) – India
- Diorygma megasporum Kalb, Staiger & Elix (2004)
- Diorygma megistosporum Makhija, Chitale & B.O.Sharma (2009) – India
- Diorygma microsporum M.Cáceres & Lücking (2011)
- Diorygma minisporum Kalb, Staiger & Elix (2004)
- Diorygma monophorum (Nyl.) Kalb, Staiger & Elix (2004)
- Diorygma nigricans Rivas Plata & Lücking (2012) – Peru
- Diorygma norsubmuriforme Aptroot, Lücking & M.Cáceres (2023) – Brazil
- Diorygma occultum (Adaw. & Makhija) Pushpi Singh & Kr.P.Singh (2020)
- Diorygma panchganiense Makhija, Chitale & B.O.Sharma (2009) – India
- Diorygma pauciseptatum S.C.Feuerst., I.P.R.Cunha, Aptroot & M.Cáceres (2014) – Brazil
- Diorygma poitaei (Fée) Kalb, Staiger & Elix (2004)
- Diorygma pruinosum (Eschw.) Kalb, Staiger & Elix (2004)
- Diorygma radiatum (D.D.Awasthi & S.R.Singh) Kr.P.Singh & Swarnal. (2008)
- Diorygma reniforme (Fée) Kalb, Staiger & Elix (2004)
- Diorygma roseopruinatum Papong, Lücking & Parnmen (2014) – New Caledonia
- Diorygma rufopruinosum (A.W.Archer) Kalb, Staiger & Elix (2004)
- Diorygma rufosporum (Patw. & C.R.Kulk.) B.O.Sharma & Makhija (2009) – India
- Diorygma rupicola B.O.Sharma & Khadilkar (2012) – India
- Diorygma salazinicum Sutjar. & Kalb (2014) – Thailand
- Diorygma salvadoriense Kalb, Staiger & Elix (2004)
- Diorygma salxanthonicum Aptroot, Lücking & M.Cáceres (2023) – Brazil
- Diorygma saxicola B.O.Sharma & Makhija (2009) – India
- Diorygma sipmanii Kalb, Staiger & Elix (2004)
- Diorygma soozanum (Zahlbr.) M.Nakan. & Kashiw. (2003)
- Diorygma sophianum E.L.Lima & Lücking (2019) – Brazil
- Diorygma spilotum (Stirt.) Pushpi Singh & Kr.P.Singh (2017)
- Diorygma sticticum Sutjar., Kalb & Lücking (2011)
- Diorygma streimannii A.W.Archer & Elix (2017) – Australia
- Diorygma subalbatum (Patw. & Makhija) B.O.Sharma & Makhija (2009) – India
- Diorygma subpruinosum Sutjar. & Kalb (2014) – Thailand
- Diorygma talisense (A.W.Archer) A.W.Archer (2007)
- Diorygma thailandicum Sutjar. & Kalb (2014) – Thailand
- Diorygma tibellii Kalb, Staiger & Elix (2004)
- Diorygma tocantinsense S.C.Feuerst., I.P.R.Cunha & Aptroot (2014) – Brazil
- Diorygma toensbergianum Aptroot & M.Cáceres (2023) – Brazil
- Diorygma tuberculosum (Stirt.) Kalb, Staiger & Elix (2004)
- Diorygma upretii Sipman (2018)
- Diorygma verrucirimosum B.O.Sharma & Makhija (2009) – India
- Diorygma wallamanensis A.W.Archer & Elix (2008) – Australia
- Diorygma weii Wei Wu & S.B.Fu (2025) – China
- Diorygma wilsonianum (Müll.Arg.) A.W.Archer (2005)
