= Connorstictic acid =

Chemical compound found in some lichens

Names
- IUPAC name 5,13,17-Trihydroxy-4-(hydroxymethyl)-7,12-dimethyl-2,10,16-trioxatetracyclo[9.7.0.0^{3,8}.0^{14,18}]octadeca-1(11),3(8),4,6,12,14(18)-hexaene-9,15-dione

Identifiers
3D model (JSmol)	Interactive image
PubChem CID	14703292
- InChI: InChI=1S/C18H14O9/c1-5-3-8(20)7(4-19)14-9(5)16(22)26-13-6(2)12(21)10-11(15(13)25-14)18(24)27-17(10)23/h3,18-21,24H,4H2,1-2H3 Key: JGHRZZSLOGDYOO-UHFFFAOYSA-N
- SMILES: Cc1cc(O)c(CO)c2c1C(=O)Oc1c(C)c(O)c3c(c1O2)C(O)OC3=O

Properties
Chemical formula	C_{18}H_{14}O_{9}
Molar mass	374.301 g·mol^{−1}
Melting point	280–300 °C (536–572 °F; 553–573 K)
- Except where otherwise noted, data are given for materials in their standard state (at 25 °C [77 °F], 100 kPa). Infobox references

Connorstictic acid is an organic compound in the structural class of chemicals known as depsidones. It occurs as a secondary metabolite in many lichen species in several genera.

== History ==
Connorstictic acid was first identified and named in 1971 by Chicita Culberson and William Culberson, from chemical analysis of Diploschistes lichens. They described it as "probably a β-orcinol depsidone", and noted that it commonly co-occurred in lichens with norstictic acid. Its structure was published in 1980 following spectral and elemental analysis of the compound purified from the lichen Pertusaria pseudocorallina. The following year, John Elix and Labunmi Lajide corroborated the structure by synthesising it in several steps from the precursor norstictic acid. They also showed that connorstictic acid could be obtained by the direct reduction of norstictic acid by the addition of sodium triacetoxyborohydride, or by catalytic reduction. In 1981, Chicita Culberson and colleagues reported on the difficulties of isolating connorstictic acid using standard thin-layer chromatography protocols, due to its co-eluting with related substances such as constictic acid and cryptostictic acid, depending on the solvent system used. They suggested that connorstictic acid could be a common or even constant satellite compound in chemistries with stictic and norstictic acids, and that many prior reports of connorstictic acid may have been misidentifications with cryptostictic acid.

== Properties ==
Connorstictic acid is a member of the class of chemical compounds called depsidones. Its IUPAC name is 5,13,17-trihydroxy-4-(hydroxymethyl)-7,12-dimethyl-2,10,16-trioxatetracyclo[9.7.0.0^{3,8}.0^{14,18}]octadeca-1(11),3(8),4,6,12,14(18)-hexaene-9,15-dione. The absorbance maxima (λ_{max}) in the infrared spectrum occur at 1250, 1292, 1445, 1610, 1710, 1745, and 3400 cm^{−1}. Connorstictic acid's molecular formula is C_{18}H_{14}O_{9}; it has a molecular mass of 374.29 grams per mole. In its purified crystalline form, its predicted melting point is 280–300 °C (536–572 °F).

== Occurrence ==
Lichen genera from which connorstictic acid has been isolated include Bryoria, Buellia, Cladonia, Cratiria, Diorygma, Graphis, Paraparmelia, Parmotrema, Pertusaria, Usnea, and Xanthoparmelia.
