= Cratiria sorediata =

Scientific classification
- Kingdom: Fungi
- Division: Ascomycota
- Class: Lecanoromycetes
- Order: Caliciales
- Family: Caliciaceae
- Genus: Cratiria
- Species: C. sorediata

Binomial name
- Cratiria sorediata Aptroot & Seaward (2009)

Species of lichen

Cratiria sorediata is a species of corticolous (bark-dwelling), crustose lichen in the family Caliciaceae. It was first described as a new species in 2009. The type specimen was collected from Aldabra in the Seychelles.

== Taxonomy ==
Cratiria sorediata was described as a new species by the lichenologists André Aptroot and Mark Seaward in 2009. The type specimen was collected in 1973 from Cinque Cases, Aldabra, where it was found growing on dead Pemphis. The species is notable for being the first in the genus Cratiria to have both soredia and the lichen product norstictic acid.

== Description ==
Cratiria sorediata has a slightly shiny, corticate thallus that is smooth and pale ochraceous grey, covering an area of up to 3 cm (1.2 in) in diameter. Soredia are formed in roundish, shallow soralia, later covering much of the thallus, and are ochraceous yellow in colour.

Apothecia (fruiting bodies) of Cratiria sorediata are sessile, round to wavy in outline, saucer-shaped, and measure 0.3–0.5 mm in diameter. The disc of the apothecia is black, shiny, and flat, without pruina. The margin of the apothecium is prominent, raised above the disc; it is black and shiny, measuring about 0.1 mm wide. The excipulum is about 75 μm wide, black on the outside, dark brown to pale brown inside, and with crystals and lumina about 10 μm wide. The hypothecium is dark brown, measuring about 20–30 μm high. The hymenium is not inspersed and measures about 70–90 μm high, with an epihymenium consisting of brown caps of paraphyses without crystals, about 4 μm high, and K− in reaction. The ascospores are ellipsoid, have a single septum, brownish-black, measuring 13–15 by 7–8 μm, and are not ornamented.

The species contains norstictic acid. This results in the thallus and soredia turning K+ (red) in chemical spot tests.

== Habitat and distribution ==
Cratiria sorediata is known to occur only at the type locality in Aldabra, Seychelles. It grows on the bark of coastal trees and shrubs.
