= Ampliotrema sorediatum =

Scientific classification
- Kingdom: Fungi
- Division: Ascomycota
- Class: Lecanoromycetes
- Order: Graphidales
- Family: Graphidaceae
- Genus: Ampliotrema
- Species: A. sorediatum

Binomial name
- Ampliotrema sorediatum Rivas Plata & Lücking (2008)

Species of lichen

Ampliotrema sorediatum, a corticolous lichen, is a species in the family Graphidaceae. It was discovered in the tropical lowland rainforest of Peru. The species epithet sorediatum refers to the unusual sorediate thallus, which distinguishes this species from its closest relative, Ampliotrema lepadinoides. The lichen was described as a new species in 2008 by lichenologists Eimy Rivas Plata and Robert Lücking.

== Description ==
The grey-olive thallus of A. sorediatum is up to 5 cm (2 in) in diameter, 50–100 μm thick, and continuously sorediate, with soralia measuring 0.1 mm in diameter. The photobiont partner Trentepohlia, characterized by angular-rounded to elongate cells, is abundantly present, and the photobiont layer and medulla are incrusted with clusters of calcium oxalate crystals. The apothecia of A. sorediatum are rounded, prominent to sessile, and partially covered by a 0.2–0.3 mm-wide pore that is yellow and pruinose. The hymenium is strongly and densely inspersed, with paraphyses that are mostly unbranched, and asci that are fusiform in shape. The protocetraric and virensic acids found in the exposed medulla and apothecial disc, respectively, give a P+ (orange-red) and K+ (red) reaction with standard chemical spot tests.

The species is found in secondary forests on tree bark in Madre de Dios, Peru. Ampliotrema sorediatum is anatomically similar to Ampliotrema dactylizum but is the first sorediate species in the genus.
