= Diorygma tibellii =

Scientific classification
- Domain: Eukaryota
- Kingdom: Fungi
- Division: Ascomycota
- Class: Lecanoromycetes
- Order: Graphidales
- Family: Graphidaceae
- Genus: Diorygma
- Species: D. tibellii

Binomial name
- Diorygma tibellii Kalb, Staiger & Elix (2004)

Species of lichen

Diorygma tibellii is a species of corticolous (bark-dwelling) crustose lichen in the family Graphidaceae. Found in the Philippines, it was described as new to science in 2004 by the lichenologists Klaus Kalb, Bettina Staiger, and John A. Elix. The species epithet honours Leif Tibell, "an eminent lichenologist and doyen of the calicioid lichens and fungi".
