= Diorygma sipmanii =

Scientific classification
- Domain: Eukaryota
- Kingdom: Fungi
- Division: Ascomycota
- Class: Lecanoromycetes
- Order: Graphidales
- Family: Graphidaceae
- Genus: Diorygma
- Species: D. sipmanii

Binomial name
- Diorygma sipmanii Kalb, Staiger & Elix (2004)

Species of lichen

Diorygma sipmanii is a species of corticolous (bark-dwelling) crustose lichen in the family Graphidaceae. Found in El Salvador, it was described as new to science in 2004 by the lichenologists Klaus Kalb, Bettina Staiger, and John A. Elix. The species epithet honours Harrie Sipman, "an eminent lichenologist and specialist in tropical lichens".
