= Xanthoparmelia lobulifera =

Scientific classification
- Kingdom: Fungi
- Division: Ascomycota
- Class: Lecanoromycetes
- Order: Lecanorales
- Family: Parmeliaceae
- Genus: Xanthoparmelia
- Species: X. lobulifera

Binomial name
- Xanthoparmelia lobulifera Hale (1986)

Species of lichen-forming fungus

Xanthoparmelia lobulifera is a species of saxicolous (rock-dwelling), foliose lichen in the family Parmeliaceae. Found in South Africa, it was formally described as a new species in 1986 by the American lichenologist Mason Hale. The type specimen was collected from a pasture along highway R30, at an elevation of about 1,600 m (5,200 ft); there, it was found growing on open sandstone cliffs. The thallus, which is quite tightly attached to its rock substrate, is bright yellow green and measure 5–8 cm (2.0–3.1 in) in diameter. It is made of more or less linear lobes measuring 0.6–1 mm wide. It has a dull black undersurface that lacks rhizines. The lichen contains stictic acid, constictic acid, and usnic acid.

== See also ==
- List of Xanthoparmelia species
