= Diorygma archeri =

Scientific classification
- Domain: Eukaryota
- Kingdom: Fungi
- Division: Ascomycota
- Class: Lecanoromycetes
- Order: Graphidales
- Family: Graphidaceae
- Genus: Diorygma
- Species: D. archeri

Binomial name
- Diorygma archeri S.Joshi & Hur (2013)

Species of lichen

Diorygma archeri is a species of corticolous (bark-dwelling) lichen in the family Graphidaceae. Found in Vietnam, it was formally described as a new species in 2013 by Santosh Joshi and Jae-Seoun Hur. The type specimen was collected from Yok Đôn National Park (Đắk Lắk province) at an altitude of about 760 m (2,490 ft). The species epithet honours Australian lichenologist Alan W. Archer.

== Description ==
Diorygma archeri has a flat thallus that is usually white or grayish-green in color and up to 800 μm thick. The outer layer of the lichen (the pseudocortex) is distinct, reaching up to 30 μm. The algal layer is well-developed and about 50–60 μm thick. The inner layer, the medulla, is white and thick, with crystals scattered throughout it.

The fruiting bodies of the lichen, called ascomata, are numerous and can vary in shape, with some being short and curved while others are more branched. They are covered by a brownish or reddish-brown layer that is surrounded by a raised, irregular margin. The hymenium, which is the part of the ascomata that contains the spores, is hyaline and can be seen to be violet-blue when treated with certain chemicals. The spores themselves are oval to elliptic in shape, multicellular, and range in size from 150 to 255 x 53 to 85 μm.

Diorygma archeri contains protocetraric acid, a lichen product that can be detected using thin-layer chromatography.

Diorygma archeri is comparable to Diorygma pruinosum, but the two differ in several ways. Specifically, D. archeri has a thick, distinctly corticate body that is grayish-green in color and contains a well-developed medulla. The apothecial disc of D. archeri is only slightly open, and its proper exciple is not carbonized. Additionally, Diorygma archeri has larger ascospores than D. pruinosum.
