= Ampliotrema cocosense =

Scientific classification
- Kingdom: Fungi
- Division: Ascomycota
- Class: Lecanoromycetes
- Order: Graphidales
- Family: Graphidaceae
- Genus: Ampliotrema
- Species: A. cocosense

Binomial name
- Ampliotrema cocosense Lücking & Chaves (2011)

Species of lichen

Ampliotrema cocosense is a little-known species of corticolous (bark-dwelling) lichen in the family Graphidaceae. Found in Cocos Island, Costa Rica, it was described as new to science in 2011. Its distinctive features include its large, muriform ascospores and a notable chemical composition.

== Taxonomy ==
Ampliotrema cocosense, was formally described as new species described by lichenologists Robert Lücking and José Luis Chaves The species epithet of this lichen is derived from its type locality, which is Cocos Island. The type specimen was collected in April 1992 on a trail above the ranger station in Cocos Island National Park, located in Puntarenas, Costa Rica.

== Description ==
Ampliotrema cocosense has a grey-olive-yellow thallus with a verrucose texture and a dense paraplectenchymatous cortex. The photobiont layer and/or medulla contain clusters of calcium oxalate crystals. The apothecia are sessile and rounded, measuring 1–2 mm in diameter, with a brown-black disc that is partially covered by a 0.3–0.6 mm wide pore. The disc also exhibits a yellow-to-orange pruina. The margin is entire, fused, and yellowish-white, covered by a thalline layer.

The species lacks a columella and periphysoids. The hymenium has a height of 150–200 μm and is inspersed with apically branched paraphyses. The ascospores are 80–100 by 17–22 μm in size, oblong, colourless, and I+ (violet-blue) when treated with iodine (indicating an amyloid reaction). They are richly muriform with thick septa and rounded lumina. The secondary chemistry of this species includes protocetraric and virensic acids along with structurally related compounds, and the thallus (medulla) has C−, K−, and P+ (orange-red) reactions to standard chemical spot tests.

The lichen is most closely related to A. lepadinoides, which has similarly sized ascospores, but much narrower with transverse septa only. Ampliotrema cocosense can be distinguished from other Ocellularia species with large muriform ascospores by its unique combination of a wide pore, absence of a columella, paraplectenchymatous excipulum, inspersed hymenium, and protocetraric acid as its main secondary substance.

== Habitat and distribution ==
Ampliotrema cocosense is known from a single, well-developed collection found in the lower montane rainforest of Cocos Island. The island's lichen diversity is not well-documented, particularly for non-foliicolous (leaf-dwelling) species. The discovery of this new species indicates that Cocos Island may harbour a unique lichen biota for certain groups of lichens. Most of the island's lichen flora represents pantropical species, with A. cocosense as the sole endemic representative.
