= Diorygma streimannii =

Scientific classification
- Domain: Eukaryota
- Kingdom: Fungi
- Division: Ascomycota
- Class: Lecanoromycetes
- Order: Graphidales
- Family: Graphidaceae
- Genus: Diorygma
- Species: D. streimannii

Binomial name
- Diorygma streimannii A.W.Archer & Elix (2017)

Species of lichen

Diorygma streimannii is a species of script lichen in the family Graphidaceae. Found in Australia, it was formally described as a new species in 2017 by lichenologists Alan W. Archer and John Elix. The type specimen was collected from Cow Bay in Cape Tribulation National Park (Queensland). The species epithet streimannii honours Heinar Streimann (1938–2001), who collected the type and "made important contributions to the study of Australian mosses and lichens".

The lichen is similar to Diorygma rufopruinosum but is distinguished by its black epithecium with white pruina and by the presence of the lichen product neotricone.
