= Diorygma isidiolichexanthonicum =

Scientific classification
- Kingdom: Fungi
- Division: Ascomycota
- Class: Lecanoromycetes
- Order: Graphidales
- Family: Graphidaceae
- Genus: Diorygma
- Species: D. isidiolichexanthonicum

Binomial name
- Diorygma isidiolichexanthonicum Aptroot (2020)
- Holotype: Joinville, Brazil

Species of lichen

Diorygma isidiolichexanthonicum is a species of corticolous (bark-dwelling), crustose lichen in the family Graphidaceae. It is found in the Atlantic Forest of Brazil.

== Taxonomy ==
The lichen was formally described as a new species in 2020 by the Dutch lichenologist André Aptroot. The type specimen was collected by the author from the Recanto das Nascentes Divina in Joinville (Santa Catarina); there, in the Atlantic Forest, it was found growing on tree bark. The species epithet refers to both the frequent isidia and the presence of lichexanthone, a lichen product that causes the thallus of the lichen to fluoresce when lit with a long-wavelength ultraviolet light (UV+). The presence of isidia is somewhat rare in Diorygma; D. australasicum and D. isidiatum are the only other members of the genus that have these reproductive propagules.

== Description ==
Diorygma isidiolichexanthonicum is distinguished by its corticolous thallus, which is continuous, lacks a cortex, and has a dull, pale ochraceous colouration, with a thickness of up to 0.2 mm. The thallus is surrounded by a thin black prothallus, while the underlying hypothallus is dense, black, and brittle, measuring approximately 0.1 mm thick. Soredia are absent in this species, but it features numerous isidia that cover the majority of the central thallus area. These isidia are cylindrical in shape, ranging from simple to irregularly branched, and vary in height from 0.1 to 0.7 mm, with a consistent width of around 0.1 mm. The photobiont associated with Diorygma isidiolichexanthonicum is trentepohlioid–a type of green algae. Reproductive structures such as ascomata and pycnidia have not been observed in this species.
