= Ampliotrema =

Scientific classification
- Kingdom: Fungi
- Division: Ascomycota
- Class: Lecanoromycetes
- Order: Graphidales
- Family: Graphidaceae
- Genus: Ampliotrema; Kalb ex Kalb (2006)

Type species
- Ampliotrema amplius (Nyl.) Kalb ex Kalb (2006)

Synonyms
- Ampliotrema Kalb (2004)

Genus of lichen-forming fungi

Ampliotrema is a genus of lichen-forming fungi in the family Graphidaceae. The genus was originally described invalidly in 2004, and validly two years later.

== Species ==
As of August 2025, Species Fungorum (in the Catalogue of Life) accepts 12 species of Ampliotrema.

- Ampliotrema amplius (Nyl.) Kalb (2006)
- Ampliotrema auratum (Tuck.) Kalb (2006)
- Ampliotrema cocosense Lücking & Chaves (2011)
- Ampliotrema dactylizum (Hale) Sipman, Lücking & Grube (2012)
- Ampliotrema discolor (Ach.) Kalb (2006)
- Ampliotrema lepadinoides (Leight.) Kalb (2006)
- Ampliotrema megalostoma (Müll.Arg.) M.Cáceres & Lücking (2012)
- Ampliotrema palaeoamplius (Aptroot & Sipman) Kalb (2006)
- Ampliotrema panamense (Hale) Sipman & Lücking (2012)
- Ampliotrema rimosum (Hale) Merc.-Díaz, Lücking & Parnmen (2014)
- Ampliotrema sanguineum Lücking (2015)
- Ampliotrema sorediatum Rivas Plata & Lücking (2012)
- Ampliotrema subglobosum Poengs. & Lumbsch (2024) – Thailand
