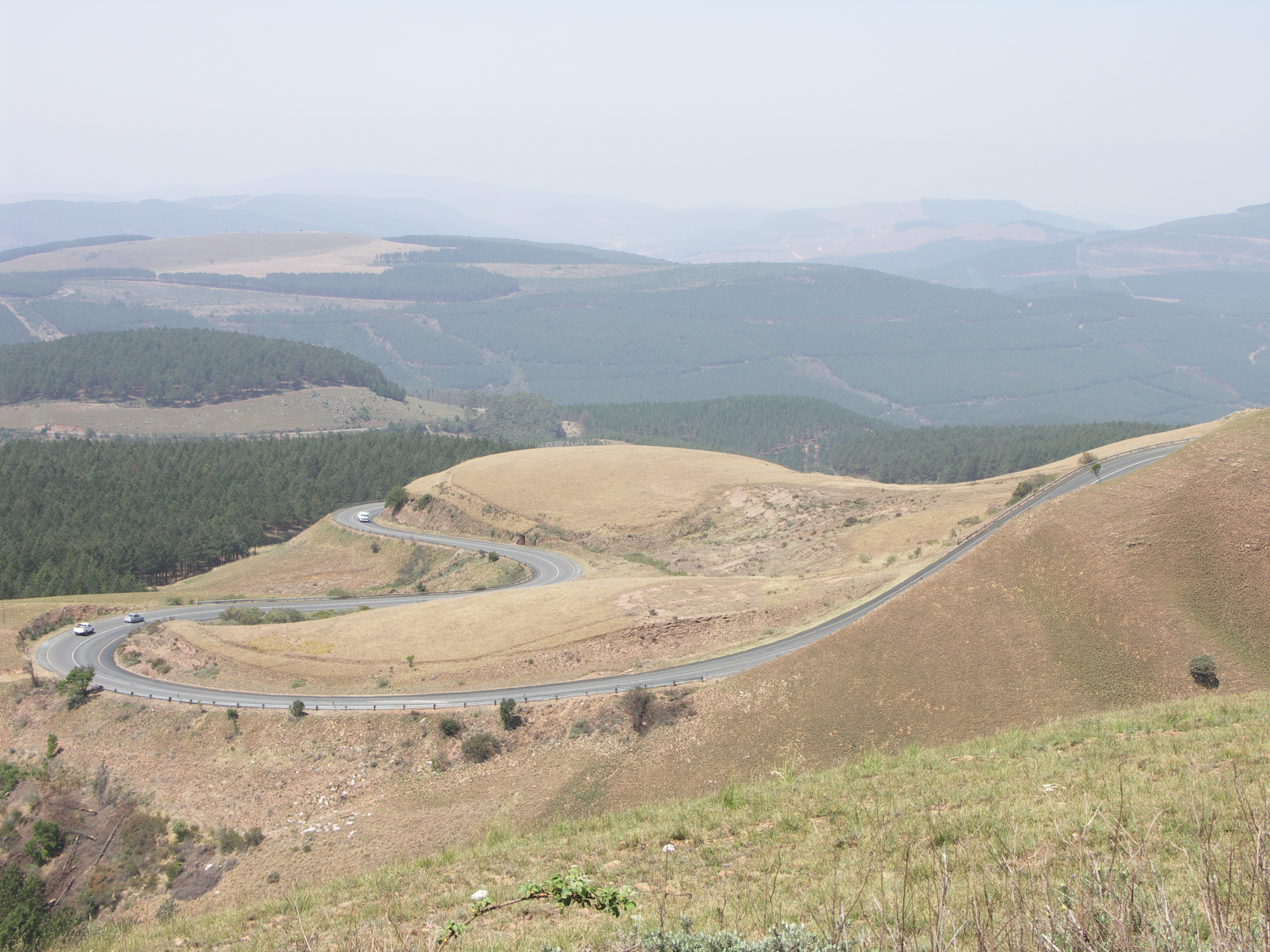
- General habitat of type specimen

Scientific classification
- Kingdom: Fungi
- Division: Ascomycota
- Class: Lecanoromycetes
- Order: Lecanorales
- Family: Parmeliaceae
- Genus: Xanthoparmelia
- Species: X. transvaalensis

Binomial name
- Xanthoparmelia transvaalensis Hale, T.H.Nash, Elix (1986)

= Xanthoparmelia transvaalensis =

Species of lichen

Xanthoparmelia transvaalensis is a species of saxicolous (rock-dwelling), foliose lichen in the family Parmeliaceae. Found in Southern Africa, it was formally described as a new species in 1986 by the lichenologists Mason Hale, Thomas Hawkes Nash III, and John Elix. The type specimen was collected from the summit of Long Tom Pass at an elevation of 2,140 m (7,020 ft), where it was found growing in a pasture on a sandstone outcrop.

The lichen thallus is dark yellowish green and measures 6–8 cm (2.4–3.1 in) broad, comprising lobes that are 1–2 mm. The thallus surface is densely covered with isidia that are more or less globose (roughly spherical) with a constriction at their bases. The undersurface of the thallus is brown to black with a sparse to moderate number of unbranched rhizines that are 0.5–1 mm long. The lichen contains several secondary metabolites (lichen products): dehydroconstipatic, pertusaric and usnic acids, trace amounts of constipatic and protoconstipatic acids, and some unidentified fatty acids.

== See also ==
- List of Xanthoparmelia species
