= Cratiria =

Scientific classification
- Domain: Eukaryota
- Kingdom: Fungi
- Division: Ascomycota
- Class: Lecanoromycetes
- Order: Caliciales
- Family: Caliciaceae
- Genus: Cratiria; Marbach (2000)

Type species
- Cratiria lauri-cassiae (Fée) Marbach (2000)

Synonyms
- Mannia Trevis. (1857)

Genus of lichens in the family Caliciaceae

Cratiria is a genus of lichen-forming fungi in the family Caliciaceae. The genus has a widespread distribution, especially in tropical regions, and contains about 20 species. The genus was circumscribed by Austrian lichenologist Bernhard Marbach in 2000, with Cratiria lauri-cassiae assigned as the type species.

== Species ==
- Cratiria aggrediens (Stirt.) Marbach (2000)
- Cratiria americana (Fée) Kalb & Marbach (2000)
- Cratiria amphorea (Eckfeldt) Marbach (2000)
- Cratiria burleighensis Elix (2014) – Australia
- Cratiria chloraceus Marbach (2000)
- Cratiria dissimilis (Nyl.) Marbach (2000)
- Cratiria exalbida (Kremp.) Marbach (2000)
- Cratiria jamesiana Elix & H.Mayrhofer (2020)
- Cratiria lauri-cassiae (Fée) Marbach (2000)
- Cratiria lauri-cassiaeoides (Aptroot) Elix (2019)
- Cratiria mayrhoferi Elix (2018) – Australia
- Cratiria megaobscurior Marbach (2000)
- Cratiria melanochlora (Kremp.) Marbach (2000)
- Cratiria obscurior (Stirt.) Marbach & Kalb (2000)
- Cratiria paramoensis Marbach (2000)
- Cratiria rutilans Marbach (2000)
- Cratiria rutilantoides Marbach (2000)
- Cratiria saltensis (H.Magn.) Marbach (2000)
- Cratiria sorediata Aptroot & Seaward (2009) – Seychelles
- Cratiria streimannii Elix (2014) – Australia
- Cratiria submuriformis (Aptroot & Diederich) Elix (2019)
- Cratiria subtropica (Elix) Elix (2014) – Australia
- Cratiria verdonii Elix (2014) – Australia
- Cratiria vioxanthina (Elix) Kalb & Elix (2012)
