= Itaguatins =

Municipality in Tocantins, Brazil

- Municipality
- Location in Brazil
- Coordinates: 5°46′04″S 47°28′51″W
- Country: Brazil
- Region: Northern
- State: Tocantins
- Mesoregion: Ocidental do Tocantins
- City status: 1945

Area
  - Total: 739.846 km^{2} (285.656 sq mi)
- Elevation: 130 m (430 ft)

Population (2020)
  - Total: 5,832
  - Density: 7.883/km^{2} (20.42/sq mi)
- Time zone: UTC−3 (BRT)

Itaguatins is a municipality in the state of Tocantins in the Northern region of Brazil.

== See also ==
- List of municipalities in Tocantins
