= Depsidone =

Class of chemical compounds

Chemical structure of the depsidone norstictic acid

Depsidones (+ "depside" + "one") are chemical compounds that are sometimes found as secondary metabolites in lichens. They are esters that are both depsides and cyclic ethers. An example is norstictic acid.
