= Salazinic acid =

Chemical compound found in some lichens

Names
- IUPAC name 1,3-Dihydro-1,4,10-trihydroxy-5-(hydroxymethyl)-8-methyl-3,7-dioxo-7H-isobenzofuro[4,5-b][1,4]benzodioxepin-11-carboxaldehyde

Identifiers
CAS Number	521-39-1
3D model (JSmol)	Interactive image
ChEMBL	ChEMBL172439
ChemSpider	4478508
ECHA InfoCard	100.007.558
EC Number	208-312-0
PubChem CID	5320418
CompTox Dashboard (EPA)	DTXSID001317270
- InChI: InChI=1S/C18H12O10/c1-5-2-8(21)6(3-19)13-9(5)16(23)27-14-7(4-20)12(22)10-11(15(14)26-13)18(25)28-17(10)24/h2-3,18,20-22,25H,4H2,1H3 Key: QQTKVXCQLZIJPP-UHFFFAOYSA-N
- SMILES: CC1=CC(=C(C2=C1C(=O)OC3=C(O2)C4=C(C(=C3CO)O)C(=O)OC4O)C=O)O

Properties
Chemical formula	C_{18}H_{12}O_{10}
Molar mass	388.284 g·mol^{−1}
- Except where otherwise noted, data are given for materials in their standard state (at 25 °C [77 °F], 100 kPa). Infobox references

Salazinic acid is a depsidone with a lactone ring. It is found in some lichens, and is especially prevalent in Parmotrema and Bulbothrix, where its presence or absence is often used to help classify species in those genera.

== History ==
In 1897, Friedrich Wilhelm Zopf named the chemical he originally isolated from the African species Stereocaulon salazinum as salazinic acid. Later studies showed that the compound he named was actually norstictic acid.

In 1933, Yasuhiko Asahina and J. Asano studied salazinic acid they had isolated from Parmelia cetrata, and found a unique ring system with seven members containing two phenolic components. The fundamental structure was named depsidone, that is, a seven-membered ring with an oxygen bridge binding two aromatic rings. Japanese chemists demonstrated in the late 1960s that the isolated mycobiont of the lichen Ramalina crassa could produce salazinic acid when grown in laboratory culture. Subsequent studies tried to determine the influence of environmental factors on the production of salazinic acid in culture. For example, two studies in the late 1980s showed that only 4-O-demethylbarbatic acid (a precursor of salazinic acid) was produced by the isolated mycobiont of Ramalina siliquosa when grown in malt yeast extract medium supplemented with low amounts of sucrose. When extra sucrose was added to the growth medium, the production of salazinic acid was observed; the increased osmolality enhances the reaction from 4-O-demethylbarbatic acid to salazinic acid.

== Properties ==
Salazinic acid has a molecular formula of C_{18}H_{12}O_{10}, and a molecular mass of 388.3 grams/mole. In its purified form, it exists as colourless needles with a melting point range between 260–268 °C (500–514 °F) that undergo a colour change to brown at about 240 °C (464 °F). Its solubility in water is about 27 milligrams per litre.

The compound has been shown in in vitro studies to have antimicrobial properties, but it did not have any substantive antimycobacterial effects when tested against Mycobacterium aurum. Recent (2021) research indicates that salazinic acid is a potent modulator of Nrf2, NF-κB and STAT3 signaling pathways in colorectal cancer cells.

The complete ^{1}H and ^{13}C NMR spectral assignments for salazinic acid were reported in 2000.

Lichens containing salazinic acid react K+ dark red and PD+ orange in spot tests.

== Occurrence ==
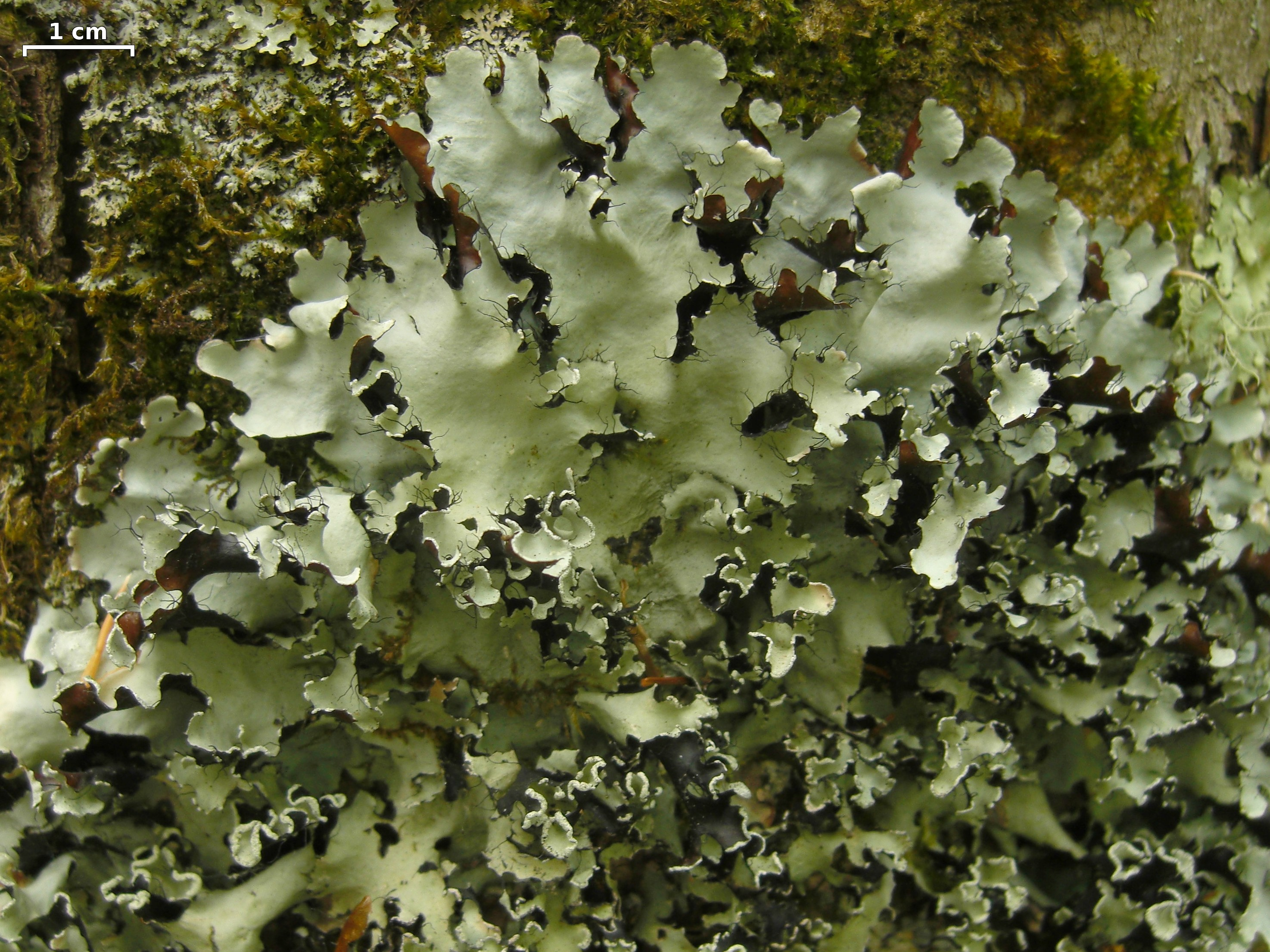
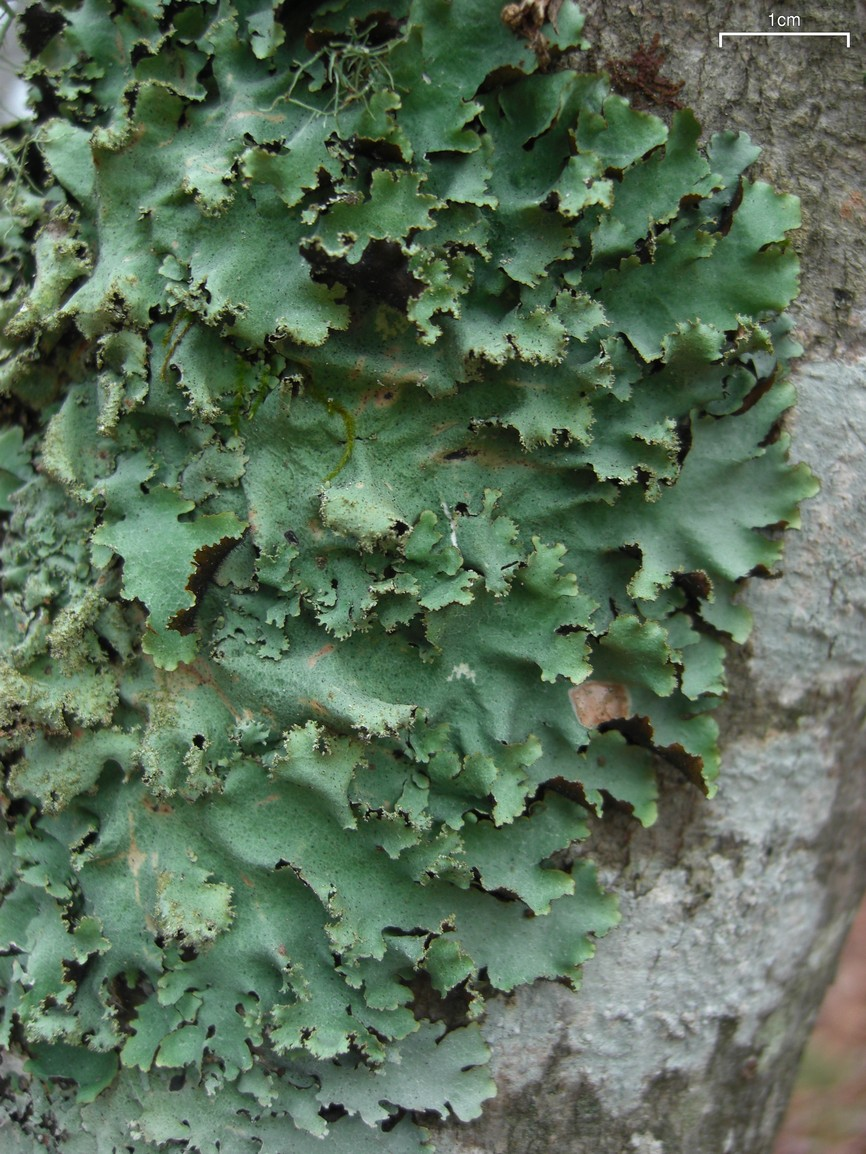
Parmotrema stuppeum (left) and Parmotrema subisidiosum (right) are two foliose lichens that contain salazinic acid.

Salazinic acid is derived via the acetyl polymalonyl pathway, a metabolic pathway that uses acetyl-CoA and malonyl-CoA (derivatives of coenzyme A). The compound is common in the large lichen genus Parmotrema, and plays an important role in the chemotaxonomy and systematics of that genus. A 2020 revision included 66 salazinic acid-containing species. The presence or absence of the compound is also important in the classification of genus Bulbothrix.

In nature, salazinic acid serves as an antioxidant as well as a photoprotectant, helping the lichen to survive in conditions of both abiotic and biotic stress. A study of three foliose lichen species showed higher quantities of salazinic acid correlating with increases in altitude. An earlier study demonstrated other possible effects of environmental conditions on salazinic acid content. It was shown that the salazinic acid content of Ramalina siliquosa is higher where the annual mean temperature is higher, and the content of the lichens growing on the dark-coloured rock or on the southern rock face is higher than that of the lichens growing on the light-coloured rock or on the northern rock face.

== Related compounds ==
The depsidones chalybaeizanic acid and quaesitic acid, isolated from the lichens Xanthoparmelia amphixanthoides and Hypotrachyna quaesita, respectively, are structurally similar to salazinic acid. In consalazinic acid, the aldehyde group of salazinic acid is replaced with a benzyl alcohol functional group.

8'-O-Methylsalazinic acid was isolated from Parmotrema dilatatum. Several new synthesised derivatives of salazinic acid were reported in 2021 using bromination, nucleophilic addition, Friedel-Crafts alkylation, and esterification.

== Eponyms ==
Several authors have explicitly named salazinic acid in the specific epithets of their published lichen species, thereby acknowledging the presence of this compound as an important taxonomic characteristic. These eponyms are listed here, followed by their taxonomic authority and year of publication:

- Acanthothecis salazinica van den Boom & Sipman (2013)
- Bryoria salazinica Brodo & D.Hawksw. (1977)
- Graphina salazinica A.W.Archer (2001)
- Karoowia salazinica Hale (1989)
- Lepraria salazinica Tønsberg (2007)
- Myelochroa salazinica Sheng L.Wang, J.B.Chen & Elix (2001)
- Ocellularia salazinica Papong, Mangold & Lücking (2014)
- Pertusaria salazinica A.W.Archer & Elix (2017)
- Phaeographina salazinica A.W.Archer (2003)
- Psiloparmelia salazinica Elix & T.H.Nash (1992)
- Diorygma salazinicum Sutjar. & Kalb (2014)
- Oropogon salazinicus Essl. (1989)
