= Bettina Staiger =

German lichenologist (born 1968)

- Born: 1968 (age 57–58); Stuttgart, Germany
- Education: University of Regensburg
- Scientific career
- Fields: Lichenology
- Workplaces: University of Regensburg
- Author abbrev. (botany): Staiger

Bettina Staiger (born 1968) is a German lichenologist known for her systematic studies of tropical lichen families, particularly the Graphidaceae. Born in Stuttgart, she completed her doctoral research at the University of Regensburg under Klaus Kalb's supervision, defending her dissertation on Graphidaceae taxonomy in 2002. Her research combines traditional morphological methods with chemotaxonomy and molecular phylogenetics, producing influential monographs on several lichen genera including Haematomma, Diorygma, and Ramboldia. She received the prestigious de Candolle Prize in 2004 for her contributions to botanical research.

== Early life and education ==
Staiger was born in Stuttgart and read natural sciences and biology at the University of Regensburg between 1988 and 1995, a period in which she encountered the tropical lichen specialist Klaus Kalb. She undertook doctoral research under Kalb's supervision on the taxonomically unruly family Graphidaceae and defended her dissertation in 2002, the resulting monograph forming the first modern synthesis of the family.

== Research and contributions ==
Staiger's scholarship is characterised by meticulous comparative morphology allied to chemotaxonomy and, subsequently, multigene phylogenetics. The Graphidaceae revision scrutinised more than a thousand specimens representing 175 species and proposed a natural generic framework that has since been widely adopted in tropical lichenology. Beyond Graphidaceae she co-authored substantive treatments of several other genera—Haematomma (1995), Diorygma (2004), and Ramboldia (2008)—each study combining phenotype with chemistry and, where available, sequence data.

A collaborative ethos is evident in her editorship, with Andreas Frisch and Udo Lange, of Lichenologische Nebenstunden (2007), a festschrift honouring Kalb that gathered studies on tropical crustose lichens. Her chapters in the multi-volume Lichen Flora of the Greater Sonoran Desert Region introduced difficult tropical lineages to a North-American readership and underlined her commitment to accessible synthesis.

== Awards and legacy ==
The Société de Physique et d'Histoire naturelle de Genève cited Staiger's "remarkable fusion of classical and modern methods" when awarding her the de Candolle Prize in 2004 (presented 2005). This award is given every four years by the society to "reward the author or -authors of the best monograph of a genus or family of plants". Within Germany she is counted among the post-unification cohort credited with revitalising systematic lichenology and fostering international collaboration. Her Graphidaceae framework continues to guide phylogenetic and biogeographic research, while her methodological rigour influences a generation of specialist monographs. A contemporary review in The Bryologist lauded Staiger's thesis as a "splendid work" that "cuts the Gordian knot" of Graphidaceae taxonomy, predicting that its influence on tropical microlichen systematics "cannot be over-estimated" and comparing it to Josef Hafellner's seminal 1984 study on ascus structures.

Some lichen species have been named in honour of Staiger: Hemithecium staigerae Adaw. & Makhija (2005), Haematomma staigeriae Nelsen, Lücking & L.Umaña (2006), and Graphis bettinae Lücking, L.Umaña, Chaves & Sipman (2008).

== Selected publications ==
Principal works include her doctoral monograph Die Flechtenfamilie Graphidaceae – Studien in Richtung einer natürlicheren Gliederung (2002); the two-volume revision of Haematomma (1995); the first global monograph of Diorygma (2004); and the emended circumscription of Ramboldia (2008), each study setting methodological benchmarks for subsequent taxonomic research.

== See also ==
- Category:Taxa named by Bettina Staiger
