= Hypostictic acid =

Lichen-derived depsidone

Names
- IUPAC name 13,17-dihydroxy-5-methoxy-4,7,12-trimethyl-2,10,16-trioxatetracyclo[9.7.0.0^{3},8.0^{14,18}]octadeca-1(11),3(8),4,6,12,14(18)-hexaene-9,15-dione
- Other names Hypostictinsäure

Identifiers
| CAS Number | 68729-11-3 |
| 3D model (JSmol) | Interactive image |
| ChemSpider | 131911187 |
| PubChem CID | 101351294 |
- InChI: InChI=1S/C19H16O8/c1-6-5-9(24-4)7(2)14-10(6)17(21)26-15-8(3)13(20)11-12(16(15)25-14)19(23)27-18(11)22/h5,19-20,23H,1-4H3 Key: PGRWVCGZKIXMQW-UHFFFAOYSA-N
- SMILES: CC1=CC(=C(C2=C1C(=O)OC3=C(O2)C4=C(C(=C3C)O)C(=O)OC4O)C)OC

Properties
| Chemical formula | C_{19}H_{16}O_{8} |
| Molar mass | 372.3 g·mol−1 |
- Except where otherwise noted, data are given for materials in their standard state (at 25 °C [77 °F], 100 kPa). Infobox references

Hypostictic acid is a lichen secondary metabolite belonging to the depsidone class of aromatic compounds. It was first prepared in 1933 by catalytic hydrogenation of stictic acid isolated from the foliose lichen Lobaria pulmonaria, and as a natural product was later reported from an undescribed species of the crustose lichen genus Thelotrema collected in Venezuelan cloud forest. As a lichen metabolite it has been detected as a minor or trace component in several foliose and crustose lichen genera, including Pseudoparmelia, Xanthoparmelia, Nephroma, Aspicilia, Clandestinotrema, Porpidia and Rinodina. Hypostictic acid forms colourless crystals with a relatively high melting point and has been used as a model substrate in electrochemical studies that investigate the reduction behaviour of lichen depsidones.

== History and synthesis ==
Before its discovery as a lichen metabolite, the compound now known as hypostictic acid was obtained only as a reduction product of stictic acid (Stictinsäure). In 1933 Yasuhiko Asahina and co-workers reduced stictic acid (Stictinsäure) from Lobaria pulmonaria with hydrogen in glacial acetic acid using palladium on carbon as catalyst, giving a C_{19}H_{16}O_{8} depsidone that crystallised as colourless needles decomposing at 263–264 °C. They characterised this compound by elemental analysis, methoxy determinations and conversion into a dimethyl ether, and from the relationship of its methylated reduction products to those of salazinic acid concluded that stictic acid is a monomethyl ether of desoxysalazinic acid. Later work showed that this reduction product is identical with naturally occurring hypostictic acid isolated from lichens.

== Occurrence ==
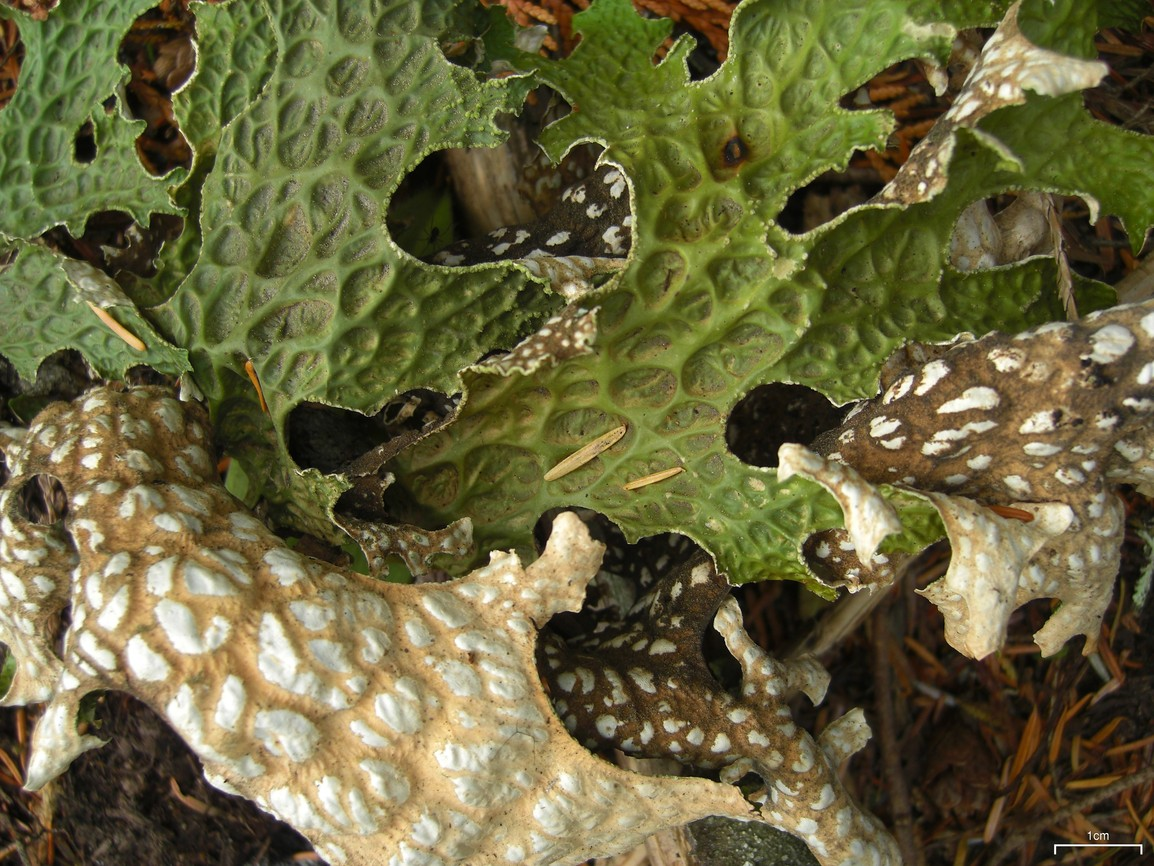
Hypostictic acid was first isolated from the foliose lichen species Lobaria pulmonaria.

Hypostictic acid has been detected in several lichens, particularly in members of the family Parmeliaceae. As a natural product it was first isolated from a new species of the crustose lichen genus Thelotrema (family Graphidaceae) collected in cloud forest at about 2,300 m elevation in the San Eusebio region of Mérida State, Venezuela. In the foliose lichen Xanthoparmelia quintaria, a South African endemic, thin-layer chromatography was used to show that hypostictic acid corresponds to Culberson's previously unnamed compound "PQ1" and co-occurs with hyposalazinic acid ("PQ2").

Hypostictic acid occurs as a minor chemical component in Pseudoparmelia sphaerospora, Nephroma australae, and has been reported from Xanthoparmelia species where it is usually present only in trace amounts. It has also been recorded from crustose lichen species in the genera Aspicilia, Clandestinotrema, Porpidia, and Rinodina.

== Chemical properties ==
Hypostictic acid is a lichen depsidone with the molecular formula C_{19}H_{16}O_{8} (relative molecular mass 372.32). It crystallises from acetone as colourless needles and has a melting point of about 263–264 °C, decomposing on heating. In infrared spectra it shows strong absorption bands around 1,695 and 1,750 cm^{−1}, in the region expected for conjugated carbonyl groups, together with bands attributable to aromatic and phenolic functions. Proton NMR spectra in pyridine-d_{5} display three singlet methyl signals, a methoxy group and two aromatic protons, consistent with a heavily substituted aromatic framework. In the mass spectrum hypostictic acid gives a molecular ion peak at m/z 372 with a characteristic series of fragment ions. Acetylation with acetic anhydride in pyridine yields the diacetate, diacetylhypostictic acid, which forms crystals melting at about 244 °C and is used as a derivative for further analytical work.

Electrochemical studies in dry dimethylformamide (DMF) using a glassy carbon working electrode have examined hypostictic acid as a model lichen depsidone. In this medium the neutral molecule undergoes an irreversible one-electron reduction to a radical anion, followed by cleavage, disproportionation and a self-protonation step that give the reduced depsidone hypostictinolide. Prolonged controlled-potential electrolysis leads to further transformation of hypostictinolide into two additional derivatives, including a ring-opened depside and an aldehyde-bearing dibenzodioxepine, whose structures were assigned using high-resolution mass spectrometry together with one- and two-dimensional NMR spectroscopy.
