= Protocetraric acid =

Names
- IUPAC name 10-Formyl-3,9-dihydroxy-4-(hydroxymethyl)-1,7-dimethyl-6-oxobenzo[b][1,4]benzodioxepine-2-carboxylic acid

Identifiers
CAS Number	489-51-0
3D model (JSmol)	Interactive image
ChEBI	CHEBI:144203
ChemSpider	4590164
EC Number	111-888-5
PubChem CID	5489486
CompTox Dashboard (EPA)	DTXSID70197633
- InChI: InChI=1S/C18H14O9/c1-6-3-10(21)8(4-19)15-11(6)18(25)27-16-9(5-20)13(22)12(17(23)24)7(2)14(16)26-15/h3-4,20-22H,5H2,1-2H3,(H,23,24) Key: VOXMONAUSQZPTP-UHFFFAOYSA-N
- SMILES: CC1=CC(=C(C2=C1C(=O)OC3=C(O2)C(=C(C(=C3CO)O)C(=O)O)C)C=O)O

Properties
Chemical formula	C_{18}H_{14}O_{9}
Molar mass	374.301 g·mol^{−1}

Hazards
- GHS labelling
Pictograms	(GHS07: Exclamation mark)
Signal word	Warning
Hazard statements	H317
Precautionary statements	P261, P272, P280, P302+P352, P321, P333+P317, P362+P364, P501
- Except where otherwise noted, data are given for materials in their standard state (at 25 °C [77 °F], 100 kPa). Infobox references

Protocetraric acid is a chemical compound with the molecular formula C_{18}H_{14}O_{9}. It is a secondary metabolite produced by a variety of lichens and is classified as a depsidone.

== History ==
In 1845 Knop and Schnedermann isolated crystalline cetraric acid from the lichen Cetraria islandica. O. Hesse proposed that cetraric acid does not exist in the lichen, but is rather the decomposition product of another acid that he called protocetraric acid, which is split up into fumaric and cetraric acids. In reviewing Hesse's work. O. Simon confirmed the statements of Knop and Schnedermann, finding cetraric acid in the plant in a free state. O. Simon did not find the protocetraric acid proposed by Hesse, but instead used that name for another acid he isolated.

Protocetraric acid was first described in the 1930s.

Rao and colleagues published the ultraviolet and infrared spectra of some lichen depsidones, including protocetraric acid, in 1967.

== Properties ==
The molecular formula of protocetraric acid is C_{18}H_{14}O_{9}; it has a molecular mass of 374.29 grams per mole. In its purified crystalline form, it exists as short needles with a melting point range of 245–250 °C (473–482 °F). Its ultraviolet spectrum has three peaks of maximum absorption (λ_{max}) at 210, 238, and 312 nm. Its infrared spectrum has several peaks: 680, 745, 785, 814, 840, 990, 1020, 1080, 1115, 1150, 1190, 1270, 1380, 1440, 1562, 1642, 1738, 3000, and 3500 cm^{−1}. A number of ester derivatives of protocetraric acid, such as succinprotocetraric acid and fumarprotocetraric acid, have also been identified in lichens.

Preliminary research has been conducted into the potential pharmacology of protocetraric acid and related compounds. Protocetraric acid has broad spectrum antimicrobial properties against some pathogenic microbes such as Salmonella typhi. It also has weak activity against SARS-CoV-2 3C-like protease (K_{i} of 3.95 μM), as does the related depsidone salazinic acid, and therefore it is being studied as a scaffold for the potential discovery of more potent drugs for the treatment of COVID-19.

=== Biological activities ===
Laboratory experiments indicate that protocetraric acid has broad spectrum antimicrobial activity against some pathogenic microbes, including antibacterial activity against Salmonella typhi, and antifungal activity against Trichophyton rubrum. It also has moderate antimycobacterial activity on the growth of Mycobacterium tuberculosis.

== Eponyms ==
Some authors have explicitly named protocetraric acid in the specific epithets of their published lichen species, thereby acknowledging the presence of this compound as an important taxonomic characteristic. These eponyms are listed here, followed by their author citation and year of publication.

- Usnea hossei var. protocetrarica G.N.Stevens (1999)
- Hypotrachyna protocetrarica Elix, T.H.Nash & Sipman (2009)
- Karoowia protocetrarica Hale (1989)
- Myriotrema protocetraricum (Hale) Hale (1980)
- Ocellularia protocetrarica Hale (1978)
- Opegrapha protocetrarica Seavey & J.Seavey (2014)
- Oropogon protocetraricus S.D.Leav. & Essl. (2013)
- Xanthoparmelia protocetrarica (Hale) G.Amo, A.Crespo, Elix & Lumbsch (2010)

Several derivatives of protocetraric acid were designed and synthesised using Diels-Alder reaction, esterification, and Friedel-Crafts alkylation of protocetraric acid with different reagents under Lewis acid. The products were tested for their α-Glucosidase inhibitory using molecular docking analysis.

== Related compounds ==
The related chemical 9'-(O-methyl)protocetraric acid was isolated from the lichen Cladonia convoluta. Conhypoprotocetraric acid, identified from lichens Relicina cf. incongrua and Lecanora myriocarpoides, was synthesized and characterized in 1995.

- Confumarprotocetraric acid
- Conhyopoprotocetraric acid
- Conprotocetraric acid
- Consuccinprotocetraric acid
- Fumarprotocetraric acid
- Hypoprotocetraric acid
- Malonprotocetraric acid
- 4-0-Methylhypoprotocetraric acid
- Succinprotocetraric acid
