= Cryptostictic acid =

Names
- IUPAC name 13,17-Dihydroxy-4-(hydroxymethyl)-5-methoxy-7,12-dimethyl-2,10,16-trioxatetracyclo[9.7.0.0^{3,8}.0^{14,18}]octadeca-1(11),3(8),4,6,12,14(18)-hexaene-9,15-dione

Identifiers
3D model (JSmol)	Interactive image
ChemSpider	34964700
PubChem CID	14991098
- InChI: InChI=1S/C19H16O9/c1-6-4-9(25-3)8(5-20)15-10(6)17(22)27-14-7(2)13(21)11-12(16(14)26-15)19(24)28-18(11)23/h4,19-21,24H,5H2,1-3H3 Key: RXSMOJAAXFOGKM-UHFFFAOYSA-N
- SMILES: CC1=CC(=C(C2=C1C(=O)OC3=C(O2)C4=C(C(=C3C)O)C(=O)OC4O)CO)OC

Properties
Chemical formula	C_{19}H_{16}O_{9}
Molar mass	388.328 g·mol^{−1}
- Except where otherwise noted, data are given for materials in their standard state (at 25 °C [77 °F], 100 kPa). Infobox references

Cryptostictic acid is a chemical compound of the depsidone class. It has the molecular formula C_{19}H_{16}O_{9} and is a secondary metabolite of various lichens. It was first reported in 1980 as a constituent of Lobaria oregana. It has since been identified in lichens in the genera Ramalina, Oxneriaria, and Usnea, among others.
