= Constictic acid =

Names
- IUPAC name 13,17-dihydroxy-12-(hydroxymethyl)-5-methoxy-7-methyl-9,15-dioxo-2,10,16-trioxatetracyclo[9.7.0.0^{3,8}.0_{14,18}]octadeca-1(11),3(8),4,6,12,14(18)-hexaene-4-carbaldehyde
- Other names 1,3-Dihydro-1,4-dihydroxy-5-(hydroxymethyl)-10-methoxy-8-methyl-3,7-dioxo-7H-isobenzofuro(4,5-b)(1,4)benzodioxepin-11-carboxaldehyde

Identifiers
CAS Number	30287-05-9
3D model (JSmol)	Interactive image
ChemSpider	95797318
PubChem CID	71436827
CompTox Dashboard (EPA)	DTXSID70893906
- InChI: InChI=1S/C19H14O10/c1-6-3-9(26-2)7(4-20)14-10(6)17(23)28-15-8(5-21)13(22)11-12(16(15)27-14)19(25)29-18(11)24/h3-4,19,21-22,25H,5H2,1-2H3 Key: FYPCEUKJORJHDL-UHFFFAOYSA-N
- SMILES: CC1=CC(=C(C2=C1C(=O)OC3=C(O2)C4=C(C(=C3CO)O)C(=O)OC4O)C=O)OC

Properties
Chemical formula	C_{19}H_{14}O_{10}
Molar mass	402.311 g·mol^{−1}
- Except where otherwise noted, data are given for materials in their standard state (at 25 °C [77 °F], 100 kPa). Infobox references

Constictic acid is a chemical compound of the depsidone class. It was first isolated in 1968 from lichen of the genus Usnea. It has since been found in many other lichen genera including Menegazzia, Crespoa, and Xanthoparmelia.
