= Norstictic acid =

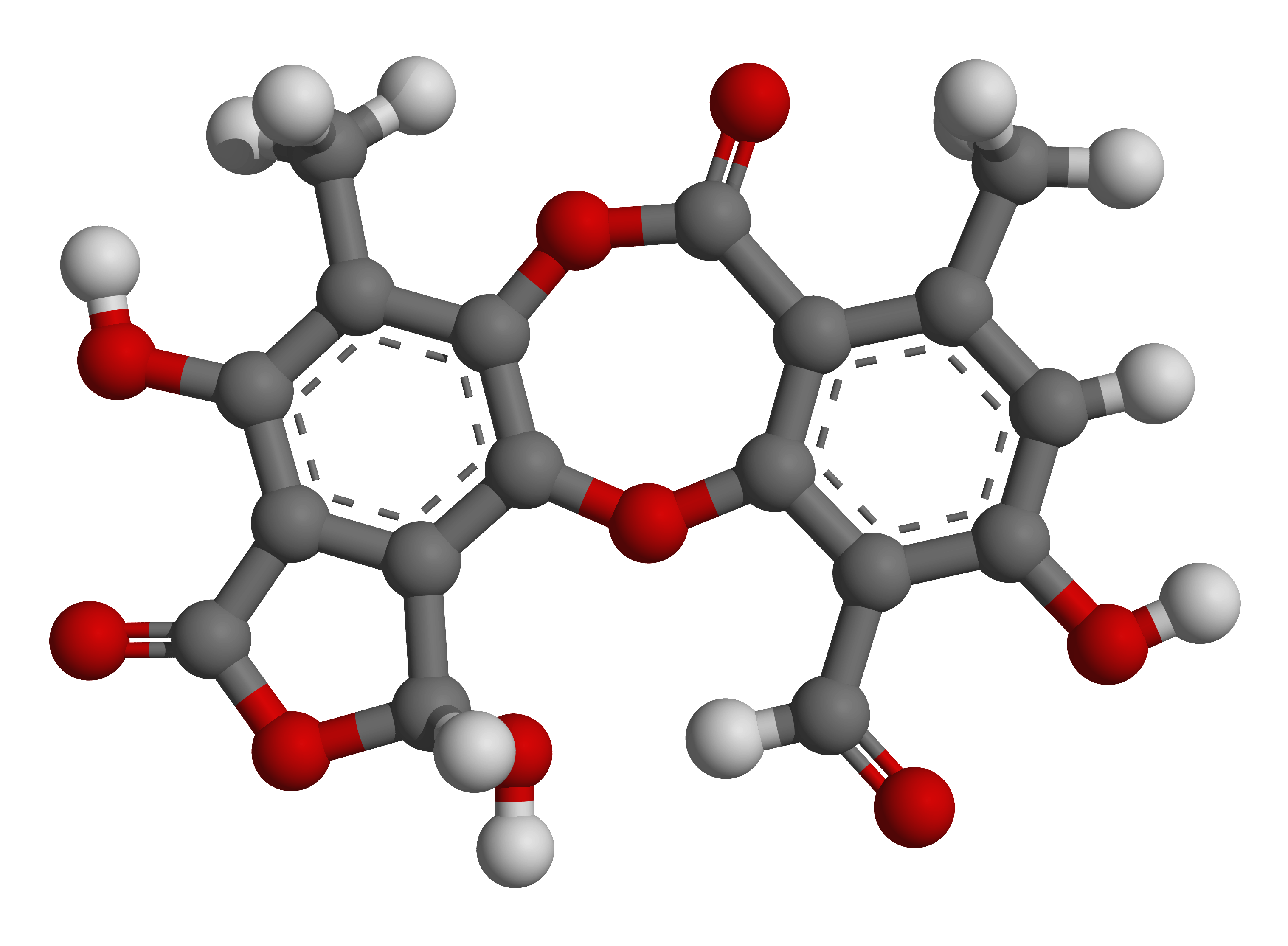

Names
- IUPAC name 5,13,17-Trihydroxy-7,12-dimethyl-9,15-dioxo-2,10,16-trioxatetracyclo[9.7.0.0^{3,8}.0^{14,18}]octadeca-1(11),3,5,7,12,14(18)-hexaene-4-carbaldehyde
- Other names Bryopogonic acid, KBio3_001409

Identifiers
| CAS Number | 571-67-5 |
| 3D model (JSmol) | Interactive image |
| ChEMBL | ChEMBL228281 |
| ChemSpider | 4528081 |
| PubChem CID | 5379540 |
| UNII | D377V822FG |
| CompTox Dashboard (EPA) | DTXSID30972564 |
- InChI: InChI=1S/C18H12O9/c1-5-3-8(20)7(4-19)14-9(5)16(22)26-13-6(2)12(21)10-11(15(13)25-14)18(24)27-17(10)23/h3-4,18,20-21,24H,1-2H3 Key: IEVVSJFLBYOUCJ-UHFFFAOYSA-N; InChI=1/C18H12O9/c1-5-3-8(20)7(4-19)14-9(5)16(22)26-13-6(2)12(21)10-11(15(13)25-14)18(24)27-17(10)23/h3-4,18,20-21,24H,1-2H3 Key: IEVVSJFLBYOUCJ-UHFFFAOYAA
- SMILES: CC1=CC(=C(C2=C1C(=O)OC3=C(O2)C4=C(C(=C3C)O)C(=O)OC4O)C=O)O

Properties
| Chemical formula | C_{18}H_{12}O_{9} |
| Molar mass | 372.285 g·mol^{−1} |
- Except where otherwise noted, data are given for materials in their standard state (at 25 °C [77 °F], 100 kPa). Infobox references

Norstictic acid is a depsidone produced as a secondary metabolites in lichens. The compound contains both an aldehyde carbonyl group and an adjacent hydroxyl group in its molecular structure, which enables it to form complexes with certain metals. This property was demonstrated in studies of lichens growing on copper-rich substrates, where norstictic acid forms complexes with copper ions in the cortex (outer layer) of the lichen thallus, resulting in a distinctive green-yellow coloration. The formation of these copper-norstictic acid complexes appears to be selective, as evidenced by comparing it to the structurally similar stictic acid, which lacks the adjacent hydroxy group and does not form copper complexes. This metal-binding capability may have implications for both lichen taxonomy and the use of lichens as biological indicators of metal mineralization, though the formation of such complexes is not the only mechanism by which lichens can tolerate high metal concentrations in their environment.

Lichens containing norstictic acid react K+ red and PD+ yellow-orange in spot tests. When K (an aqueous solution of potassium hydroxide) is added to norstictic-containing lichens, characteristic needle-shaped red crystals are produced, which are visible when the reaction is performed on thin sections of lichen mounted on a slide and viewed under a compound microscope.
