= Stictic acid =

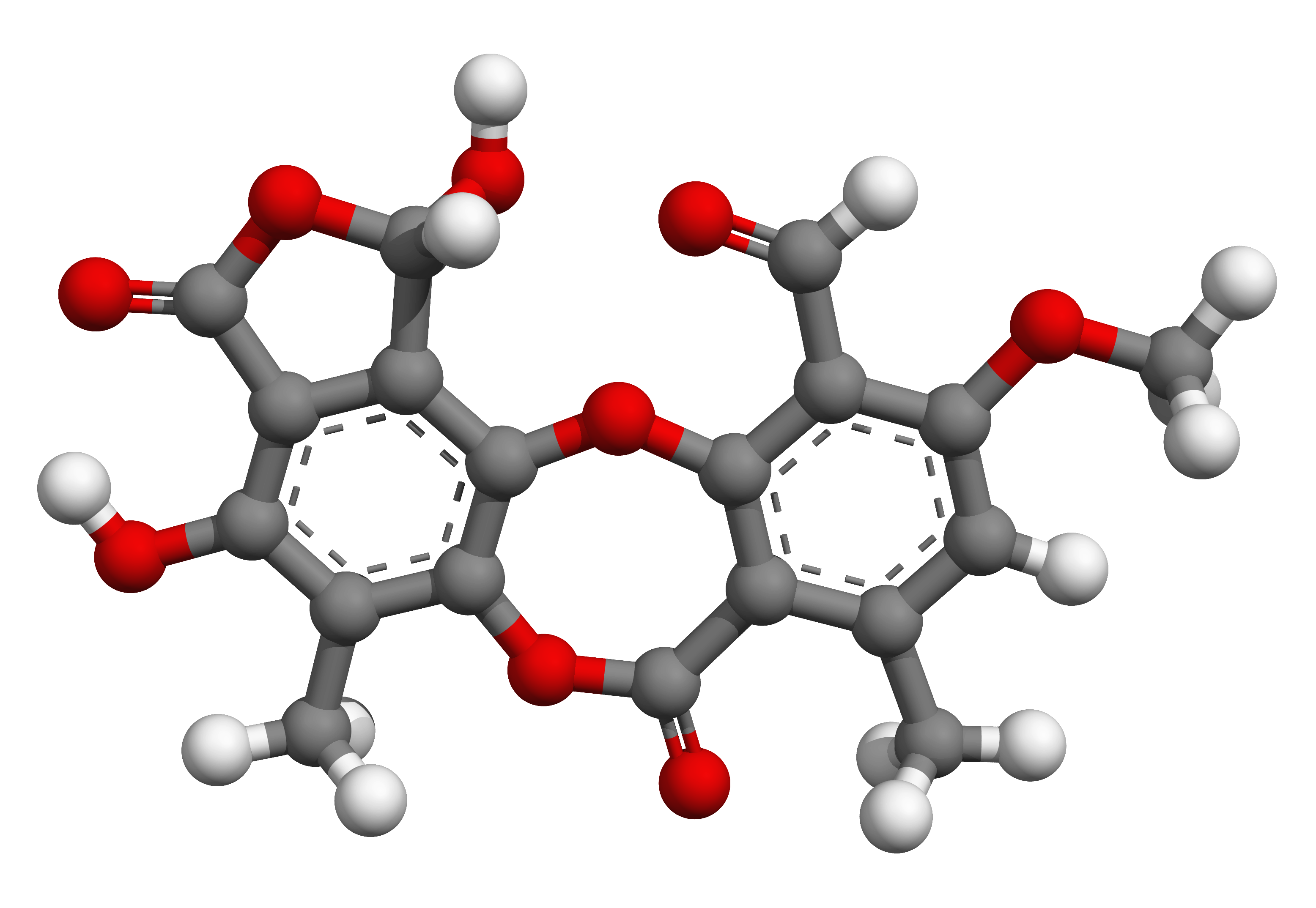

Names
- Systematic IUPAC name 1,4-Dihydroxy-10-methoxy-5,8-dimethyl-3,7-dioxo-1,3-dihydro-7H-2,6,12-trioxabenzo[5,6]cyclohepta[1,2-e]indene-11-carbaldehyde

Identifiers
CAS Number	549-06-4
3D model (JSmol)	Interactive image
ChemSpider	66327
ECHA InfoCard	100.161.455
PubChem CID	73677
UNII	NZR6AX77LP
CompTox Dashboard (EPA)	DTXSID20972053
- InChI: InChI=1S/C19H14O9/c1-6-4-9(25-3)8(5-20)15-10(6)17(22)27-14-7(2)13(21)11-12(16(14)26-15)19(24)28-18(11)23/h4-5,19,21,24H,1-3H3 Key: SKCUFZLDTAYNBZ-UHFFFAOYSA-N
- SMILES: O=C1OC(O)C2=C3C(OC(C(C(C)=CC(OC)=C4C=O)=C4O3)=O)=C(C)C(O)=C21

Properties
Chemical formula	C_{19}H_{14}O_{9}
Molar mass	386.312 g·mol^{−1}
- Except where otherwise noted, data are given for materials in their standard state (at 25 °C [77 °F], 100 kPa). Infobox references

Stictic acid is an aromatic organic compound, a product of secondary metabolism in some species of lichens.

Stictic acid is the subject of preliminary biomedical research. Stictic acid has cytotoxic and apoptotic effects in vitro. Computational studies suggest stictic acid may also stimulate reactivation of mutant p53.

== See also ==
- Constictic acid
- Hypostictic acid – Lichen-derived depsidone
- Norstictic acid
