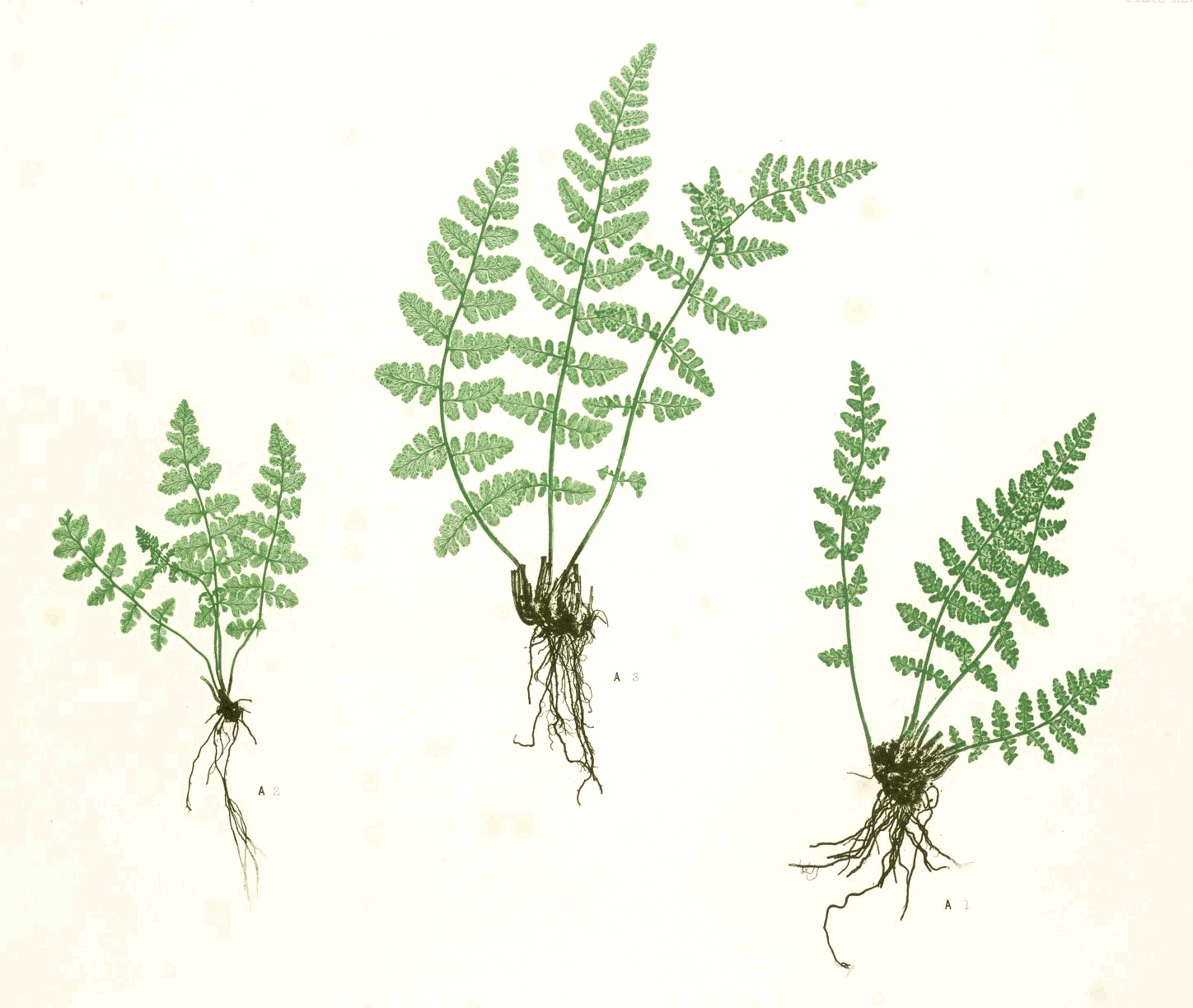

Conservation status
- Secure (NatureServe)

Scientific classification
- Kingdom: Plantae
- Clade: Tracheophytes
- Division: Polypodiophyta
- Class: Polypodiopsida
- Order: Polypodiales
- Suborder: Aspleniineae
- Family: Woodsiaceae
- Genus: Woodsia
- Species: W. ilvensis

Binomial name
- Woodsia ilvensis (L.) R.Br.

Synonyms
- Acrostichum ilvense L. (basionym)

= Woodsia ilvensis =

Oblong woodsia

Species of fern

Woodsia ilvensis, commonly known as oblong woodsia, is a fern found in North America and northern Eurasia. Also known as rusty woodsia or rusty cliff fern, it is typically found on sunny, exposed cliffs and rocky slopes and on thin, dry, acidic soils.

== Description ==
The leaves are typically 6 inches long and 1 inch wide, with stiff, erected pointed tips and cut into 12 nearly opposite stemless leaflets. The underside of the leaves are covered in white woolly fibres, which later turn rusty brown.

== Taxonomy ==
The plant was first identified as a separate species from specimens collected in Scotland in Bolton's 1785 publication Filices Britannica. Bolton distinguished between Acrostichum ilvense and Acrostichum alpina, now Woodsia ilvensis and Woodsia alpina respectively, which had previously been conflated. The genus Woodsia was established in 1810 by Robert Brown, who named it after the English botanist Joseph Woods. "Ilvensis" is the genitive form of the Latin name for the island of Elba.

Woodsia ilvensis is one of the parents of the hybrid × Woodsimatium abbeae, the other being Physematium scopulinum.

== Distribution ==
Its distribution is circumpolar. It is most abundant in Scandinavia, the Ural and Altai mountains and the eastern United States. It is also found in Japan, Alaska, Canada, coastal Greenland and various European locations including the Alps.

It is considered "Threatened" or "Endangered" in the states of Illinois, Iowa, and Maryland and "Presumed Extirpated" in Ohio. Also found in West Virginia and North Carolina, it is the most common Woodsia species in the US.

Its UK distribution is confined to Angus and the Moffat Hills in Scotland, north Wales and Teesdale and the Lake District in England. There are fewer than 90 wild clumps in the whole of the UK, where it is on the edge of its natural range and is considered to be "Endangered". For this reason it became a protected species in the UK in 1975 under the Conservation of Wild Creatures and Wild Plants Act.

== Victorian collectors and modern conservation ==
Oblong woodsia came under severe threat from Victorian fern collectors in the mid 19th century in Scotland, especially in the Moffat Hills. These hills once had the most extensive UK populations of the species but there now remain only a few small colonies whose future is under threat. This period of collecting became known as pteridomania (or "fern-fever"). The Royal Botanic Garden Edinburgh plan to use cultivated specimens and a spore bank to restore depleted wild populations.
