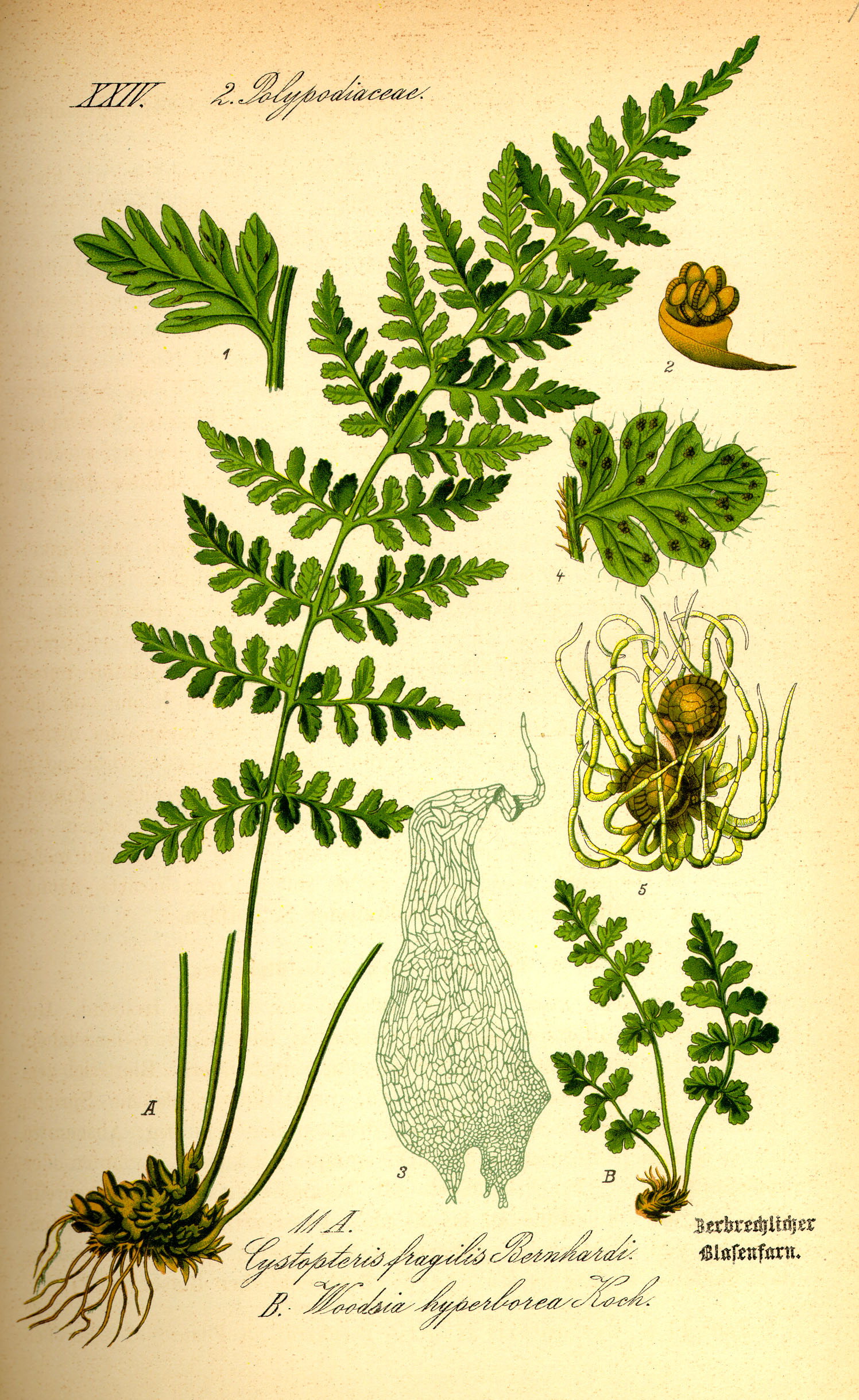

Conservation status
- Apparently Secure (NatureServe)

Scientific classification
- Kingdom: Plantae
- Clade: Tracheophytes
- Division: Polypodiophyta
- Class: Polypodiopsida
- Order: Polypodiales
- Suborder: Aspleniineae
- Family: Woodsiaceae
- Genus: Woodsia
- Species: W. alpina

Binomial name
- Woodsia alpina (Bolton) Gray

= Woodsia alpina =

Alpine woodsia

Species of fern

Woodsia alpina, commonly known as alpine woodsia, is a fern found in northern latitudes in North America and Eurasia. Also known as northern woodsia or alpine cliff fern, it is typically found in crevices, scree slopes and cliffs containing slate and calcareous rocks, especially limestone.

== Distribution ==
Its distribution is circumpolar and includes much of northern and western Canada and the coastal areas of Greenland. In the United States it is considered threatened or endangered in the states of Maine, Vermont, Michigan and New York.

It is found in various European countries including Norway and Sweden, and has a scattered distribution across Asia, including significant concentrations in the Ural and Altai mountains. Its UK distribution is confined to Angus, Perthshire and Argyll in Scotland and north Wales. The species is considered to be "near threatened" in Scotland where it is on the edge of its natural range, and it became a protected species in the UK in 1975 under the Conservation of Wild Creatures and Wild Plants Act.

== Discovery and origin ==
The first reference to this species came in John Ray's 1690 Synopsis, which recorded the discovery of a rare fern near the summit of Snowdon in Wales by Edward Lhwyd. However, the plant was first definitely identified as a separate species from specimens collected in Scotland in James Bolton's 1785 publication Filices Britannica. Bolton distinguished between Acrostichum ilvense and Acrostichum alpina, now Woodsia ilvensis and Woodsia alpina respectively, which had previously been conflated. The story is further confused because although Lhwyd called his find A. ilvense, and a translation of the Latin name suggests the plant we now know as W. ilvensis, examination of his specimens has shown that he collected W. alpina. The genus Woodsia was not established until 1810 by Robert Brown, who named it named after the English botanist Joseph Woods.

Alpine woodsia originates as a hybrid of Woodsia ilvensis and W. glabella. The latter (commonly known as smooth woodsia) does not occur in Britain although the two species are often found together in North America. All three species are similar in appearance.

== Victorian collectors ==
Alpine woodsia and W. ilvensis both came under severe threat from Victorian fern collectors in the mid 19th century in Scotland, especially in the Moffat Hills. This period of collecting became known as Pteridomania (or "fern-fever"). John Sadler, later a curator of the Royal Botanic Garden Edinburgh, nearly lost his life obtaining a fern tuft on a cliff near Moffat and a botanical guide called William Williams died collecting alpine woodsia in Wales in 1861. His body was found at the foot of the cliff where Lhwyd had first collected the species.
