= Zhurbenkoa =

Scientific classification
- Kingdom: Fungi
- Division: Ascomycota
- Class: Lecanoromycetes
- Order: Lecanorales
- Family: Malmideaceae
- Genus: Zhurbenkoa; Flakus, Etayo, Pérez-Ortega & Rodr.Flakus (2019)

Type species
- Zhurbenkoa epicladonia (Nyl.) Flakus, Etayo, Pérez-Ortega & Rodr.Flakus (2019)

Species
- Z. cladoniarum Z. epicladonia Z. latispora

Genus of lichens

Zhurbenkoa is a genus of lichenicolous (lichen-dwelling) fungi in the family Malmideaceae. It comprises three species. Zhurbenkoa fungi grow on the thalli of species in the widespread lichen genus Cladonia. The genus was established in 2019 and named after the Russian scientist Mikhail Zhurbenko for his work studying fungi that live on lichens. These tiny parasites produce minute dark spots less than half a millimetre wide on their host lichens, and the three species can be distinguished by differences in their ascospore shapes and sizes.

== Taxonomy ==
The genus was circumscribed in 2019 by Adam Flakus, Javier Etayo, Sergio Pérez-Ortega, and Pamela Rodriguez-Flakus, with Zhurbenkoa epicladonia assigned as the type species. Closely related genera are Savoronala and Sprucidea. The generic name honours the Russian lichenologist Mikhail Zhurbenko, "for his magnificent contribution to knowledge on the biodiversity and systematics of lichenicolous fungi, including lichen parasites colonizing Cladonia".

== Description ==
Zhurbenkoa is a minute fungus that grows only on the tiny, leaf-like squamules of Cladonia lichens. Its reproductive structures, the apothecia, appear as scattered, pin-head dots no wider than half a millimetre; they are round to slightly elongated, dark grey-brown to almost black, and often wear a fine pale frost (pruina) of surface crystals. The discs sit directly on the host without a separating rim, so each apothecium looks like a smooth, slightly convex spot nestled among the lichen squamules.

A thin section shows that the apothecial wall (the exciple) is colourless inside and built from hyphae that radiate outward in a glass-like, strongly gelatinised matrix. Above this, the epihymenium is sprinkled with minute, hyaline to yellowish crystals that dissolve instantly when a drop of potassium hydroxide solution is applied. The hymenium, the vertical layer that produces spores, is firmly cemented and stains deep blue with iodine, while its supporting filaments (paraphyses) branch sparingly and never develop swollen caps. The spore sacs (asci) show an intermediate design between the common Lecanora and Micarea types, recognised by a wide, clear canal encircled by a blue-staining ring when treated with iodine.

Each ascus contains eight colourless ascospores that are either without cross-walls or divided by a single transverse septum and lack any outer sheath. Measurements of hundreds of spores show three size clusters that correspond to the recognised species: Z. epicladonia has the longest, narrowly ellipsoidal 1-septate spores; Z. cladoniarum produces shorter, narrow, aseptate spores; and Z. latispora forms the broadest aseptate spores. All members share a lichenicolous lifestyle—rather than building their own lichen, they live parasitically or benignly on Cladonia hosts—making Zhurbenkoa the first genus in the family Malmideaceae to adopt this mode of life.

== Species ==
- Zhurbenkoa cladoniarum (Müll.Arg.) Flakus, Etayo, Pérez-Ortega & Zdeněk Rodr.Flakus (2019) – Brazil
- Zhurbenkoa epicladonia (Nyl.) Flakus, Etayo, Pérez-Ortega & Rodr.Flakus (2019) – Europe; South America
- Zhurbenkoa latispora Flakus, Etayo, Pérez-Ortega & Rodr.Flakus (2019) – South America
