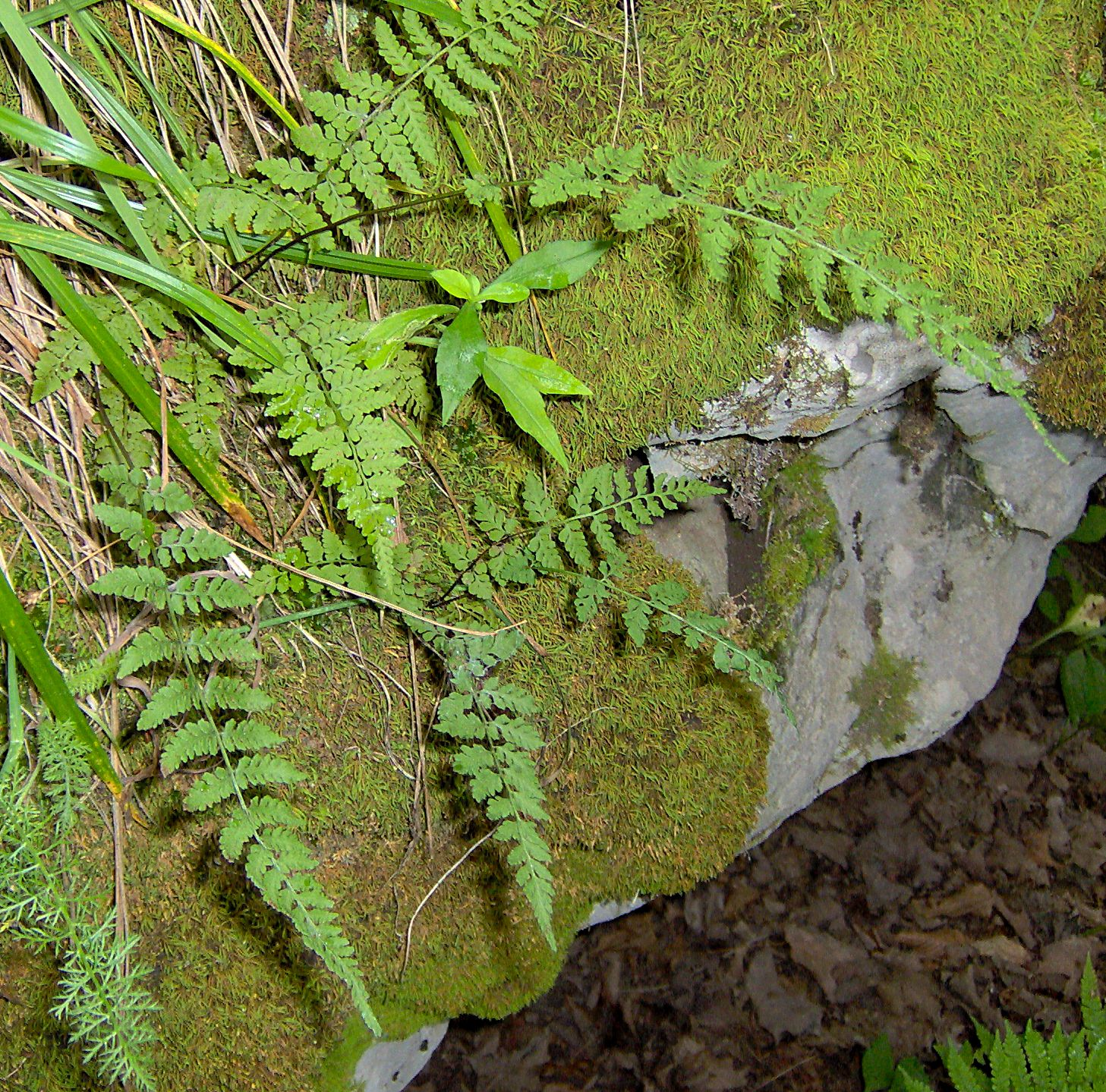

Conservation status
- Secure (NatureServe)

Scientific classification
- Kingdom: Plantae
- Clade: Embryophytes
- Clade: Tracheophytes
- Division: Polypodiophyta
- Class: Polypodiopsida
- Order: Polypodiales
- Suborder: Aspleniineae
- Family: Woodsiaceae
- Genus: Physematium
- Species: P. obtusum

Binomial name
- Physematium obtusum (Spreng.) Torr.

= Physematium obtusum =

Species of fern

Physematium obtusum, the bluntlobe cliff fern, is a common rock fern of Appalachia and eastern North America. It prefers a calcareous substrate, but also grows in neutral soils. It typically grows on cliffs, balds, ledges, ridges, talus and rocky slopes.

This fern is often confused with various ferns of the genus Cystopteris but is distinguished by its hairy nature.
