= Physematium indusiosum =

Conservation status
- Vulnerable (IUCN 3.1)

Scientific classification
- Kingdom: Plantae
- Clade: Tracheophytes
- Division: Polypodiophyta
- Class: Polypodiopsida
- Order: Polypodiales
- Suborder: Aspleniineae
- Family: Woodsiaceae
- Genus: Physematium
- Species: P. indusiosum

Binomial name
- Physematium indusiosum (Christ) Li Bing Zhang, N.T.Lu & X.F.Gao

Synonyms
- Cheilanthes straminea Brause; Cheilanthopsis indusiosa (Christ) Ching; Cheilanthopsis straminea (Brause) Hieron. ex Copel.; Woodsia indusiosa Christ

Species of fern

Physematium indusiosum is a species of fern in the family Woodsiaceae. It is endemic to China. Its natural habitat is subtropical or tropical moist lowland forests. It is threatened by habitat loss.
