= Physematium neomexicanum =

Conservation status
- Apparently Secure (NatureServe)

Scientific classification
- Kingdom: Plantae
- Clade: Tracheophytes
- Division: Polypodiophyta
- Class: Polypodiopsida
- Order: Polypodiales
- Suborder: Aspleniineae
- Family: Woodsiaceae
- Genus: Physematium
- Species: P. neomexicanum

Binomial name
- Physematium neomexicanum (Windham) Li Bing Zhang, N.T.Lu & X.F.Gao

Synonyms
- Woodsia neomexicana Windham; Woodsiopsis neomexicana (Windham) Shmakov

Species of fern

Physematium neomexicanum, the New Mexican cliff fern, is a fern species native to the Southwestern United States and northern Mexico.

== Distribution ==
The core of its range is in Coahuila, Nuevo León, Zacatecas, New Mexico, southeastern Utah, Arizona, western Texas , and southern Colorado, with isolated populations reported from Oklahoma and South Dakota. The plant usually grows in cracks in the sides of cliffs, on top of rocks, etc.

== Description ==
Physematium neomexicanum has stems that are largely obscured by the persistent bases of scales and dead leaf bases. Leaves are up to 30 cm long, pinnate with pinnatifid pinnules (leaflets) with scattered hairs.

The indusia has narrow, thread-like segments. Spores average about 50 μm in diameter.
