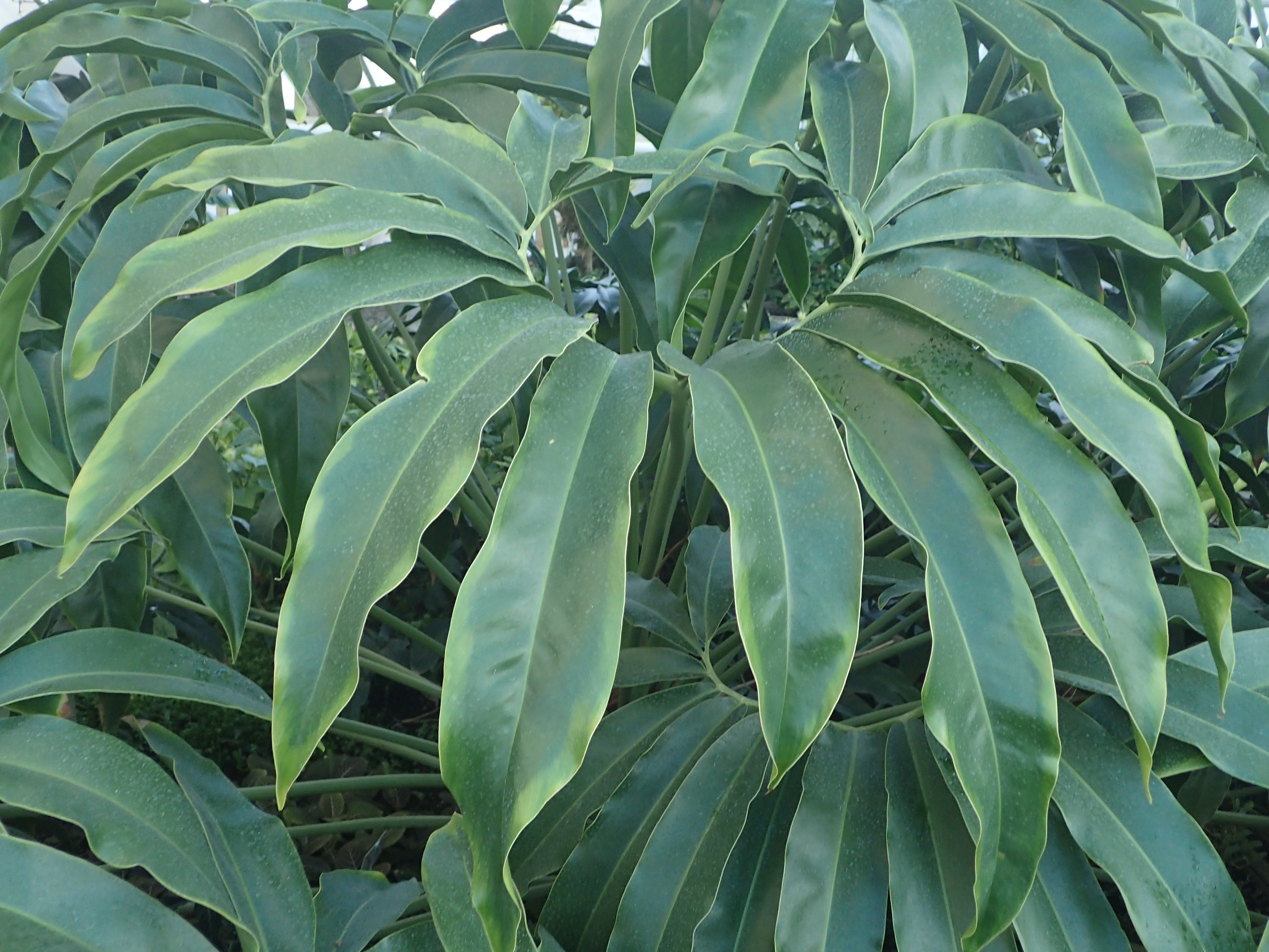
- Location taken: Berlin Botanical Garden and Botanical Museum

Scientific classification
- Kingdom: Plantae
- Clade: Tracheophytes
- Clade: Angiosperms
- Clade: Monocots
- Order: Alismatales
- Family: Araceae
- Genus: Philodendron
- Species: P. goeldii

Binomial name
- Philodendron goeldii G.M.Barroso

Synonyms
- Philodendron spruceanum (Schott) G.M.Barroso, without basionym ref; not Philodendron spruceanum G.S.Bunting; Thaumatophyllum spruceanum Schott

= Philodendron goeldii =

Species of plant

Philodendron goeldii, synonym Thaumatophyllum spruceanum, is a neotropical hemiepiphytic or scrambling plant in the genus Philodendron, in the family Araceae. It is native to northern South America.

== Description ==
Philodendron goeldii is noted for its unusually hoop-shaped, parallel-pinnately veined, pedately divided leaves; these are similar to those of the sympatric species Philodendron leal-costae. Each leaf consists of 10-20 leaflets, with the central leaflet 18–50 cm long.

P. goeldii is self-heading (arborescent or tree-like) and occurs both as a terrestrial shrub in sandy soil along riverbanks and forest margins, and as a hemiepiphyte atop larger trees in dense forest.

The fruit of P. goeldii is edible and sweet, reminiscent of pineapple or banana.

== Taxonomy ==
The species was first described by Heinrich Wilhelm Schott in 1859 as Thaumatophyllum spruceanum. It was initially the only species in the genus Thaumatophyllum. The specific epithet spruceanum refers to botanist Richard Spruce, credited as being the first to collect specimens of the plant from the Amazon rainforest in 1851.

The species was later moved to Philodendron in 1962 by Graziela M. Barroso, placed alongside other members of what was then the subgenus Meconostigma. However, she did not explicitly refer to the basionym Thaumatophyllum spruceanum when publishing the combination Philodendron spruceanum, rendering it unacceptable. (Philodendron spruceanum was later published correctly for a different species.) Molecular phylogenetics research in 2018 resulted in the subsequent resurrection of Thaumatophyllum, with Meconostigma species being placed within it. As of October 2025, Plants of the World Online and other taxonomic databases did not accept Thaumatophyllum, treating it as a synonym of Philodendron. As the name Philodendron spruceanum is not acceptable, the later synonym Philodendron goeldii is used.

== Distribution ==
Philodendron goeldii is native to the humid rainforest of northern Brazil, Colombia, Ecuador, French Guiana, Peru, Suriname, and Venezuela.

== Gallery ==
Additional images
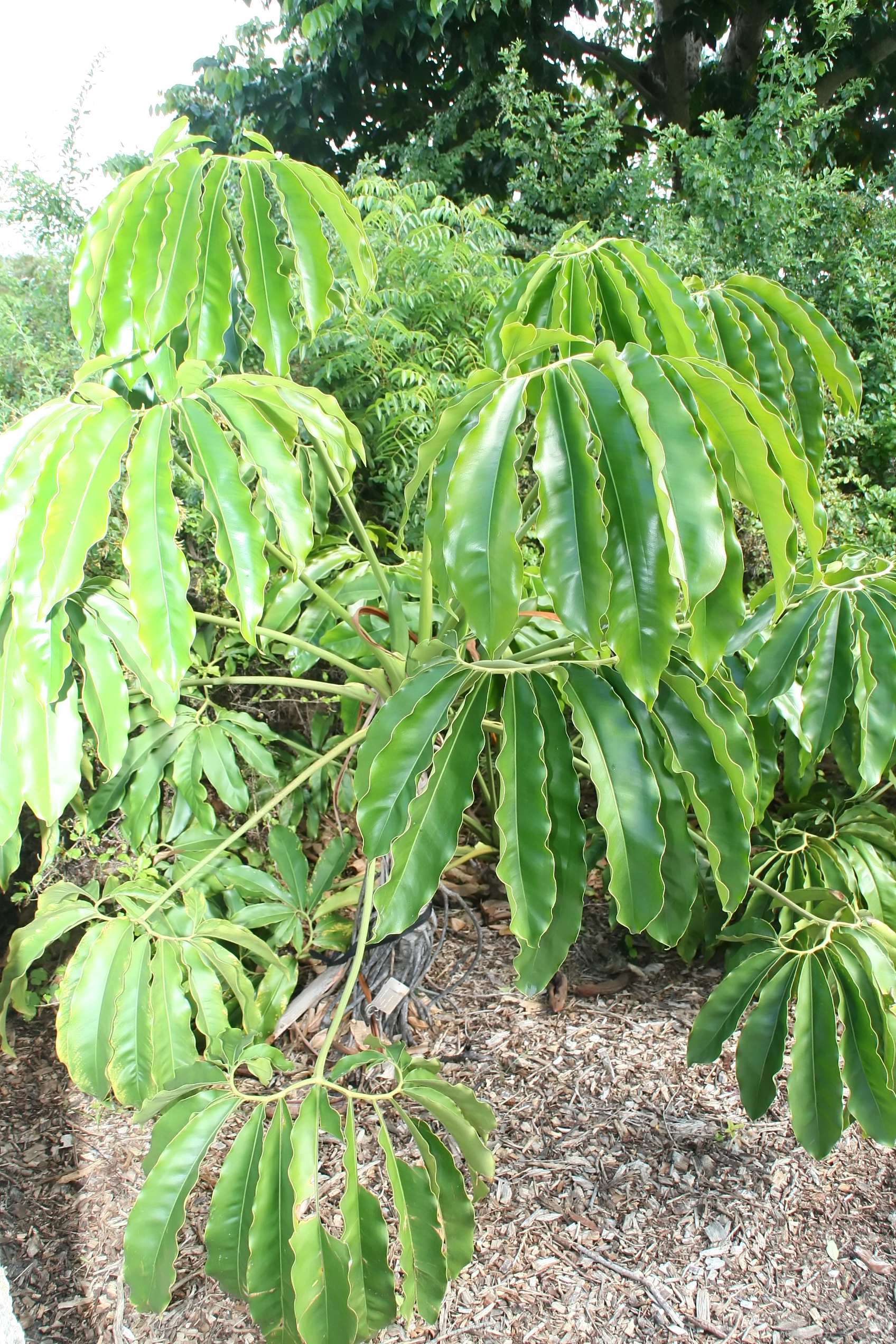
Location taken: Fairchild Tropical Botanic Garden, Miami.

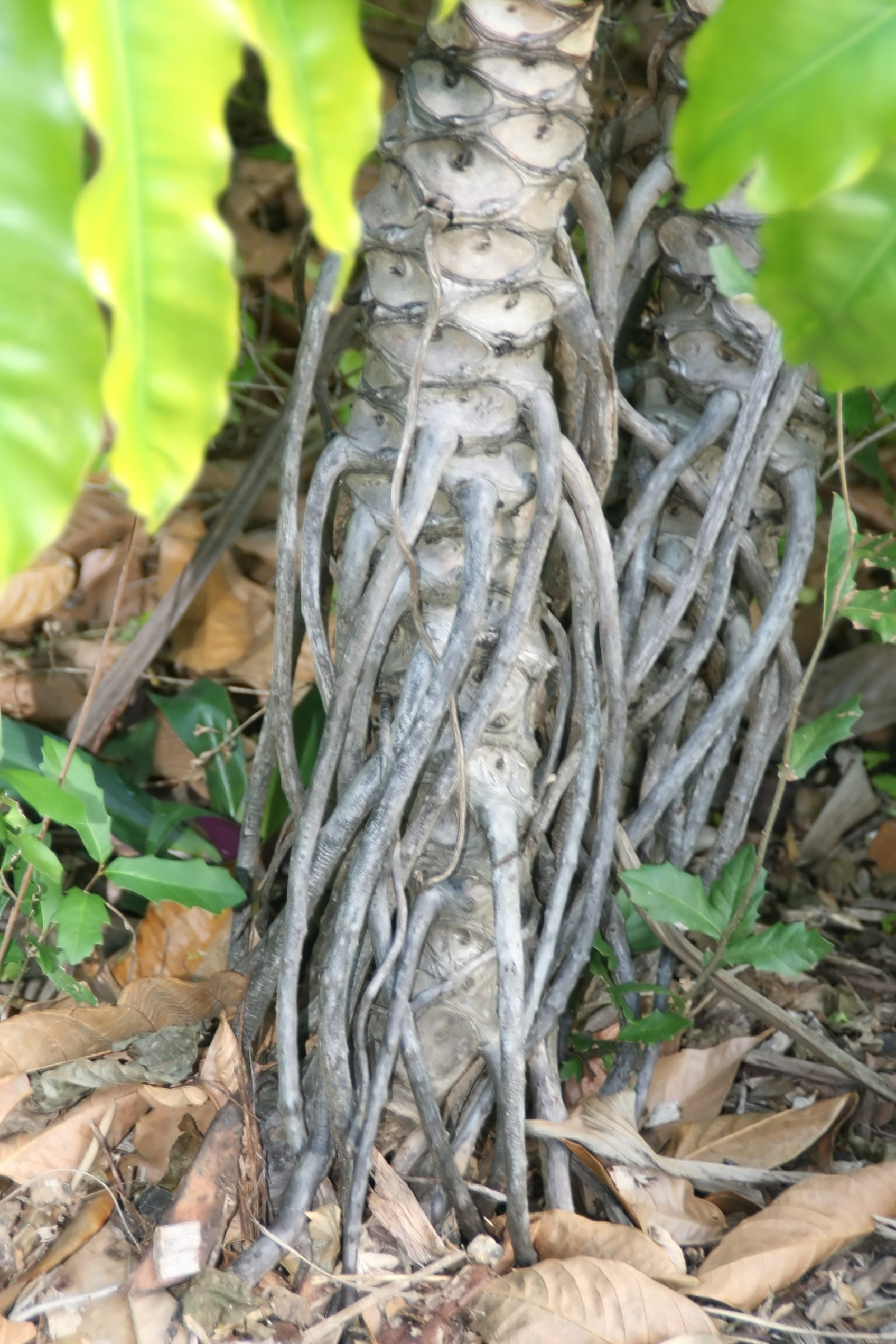
Aerial roots and leaf scars on the trunk

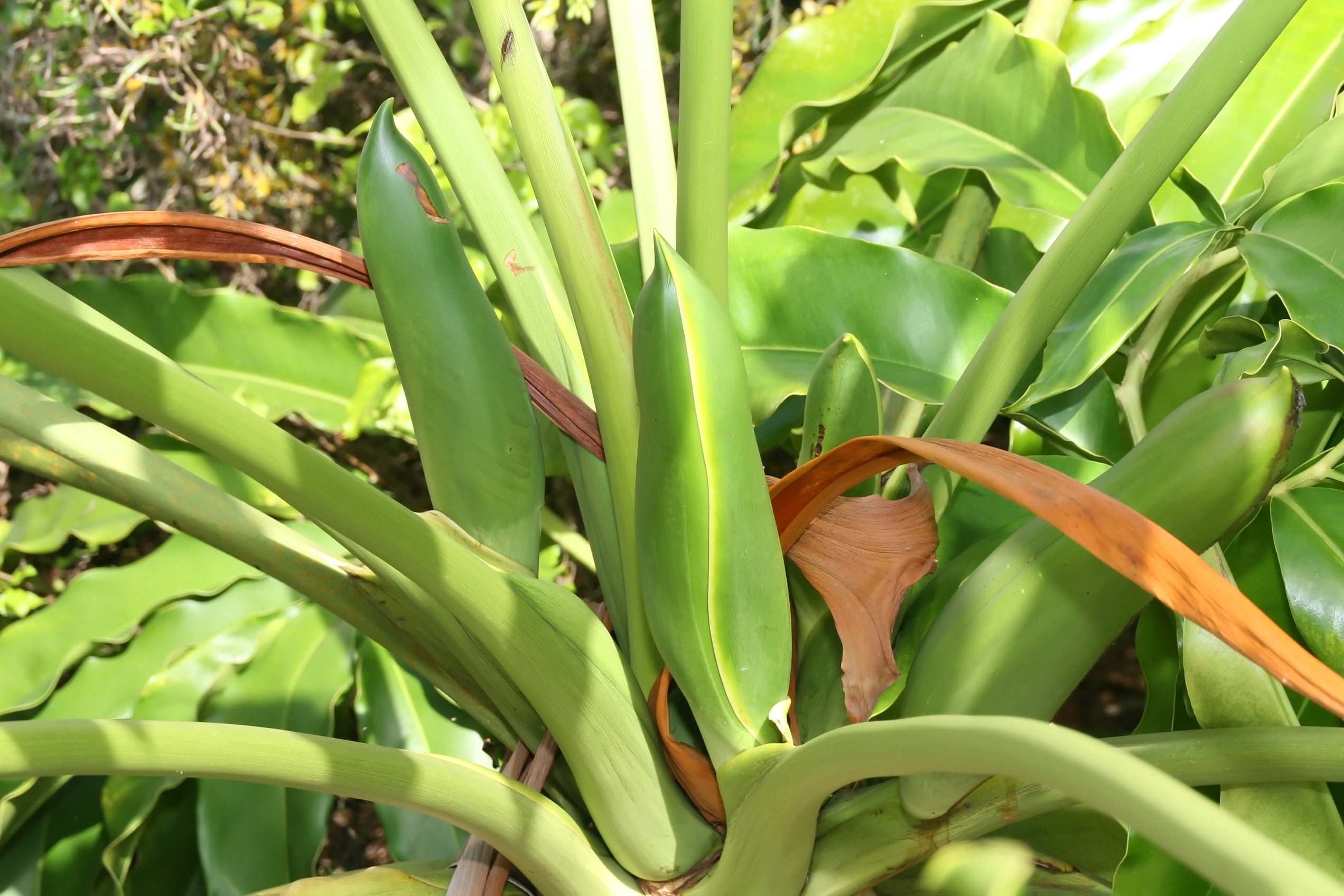
Spathes surrounding the flowers

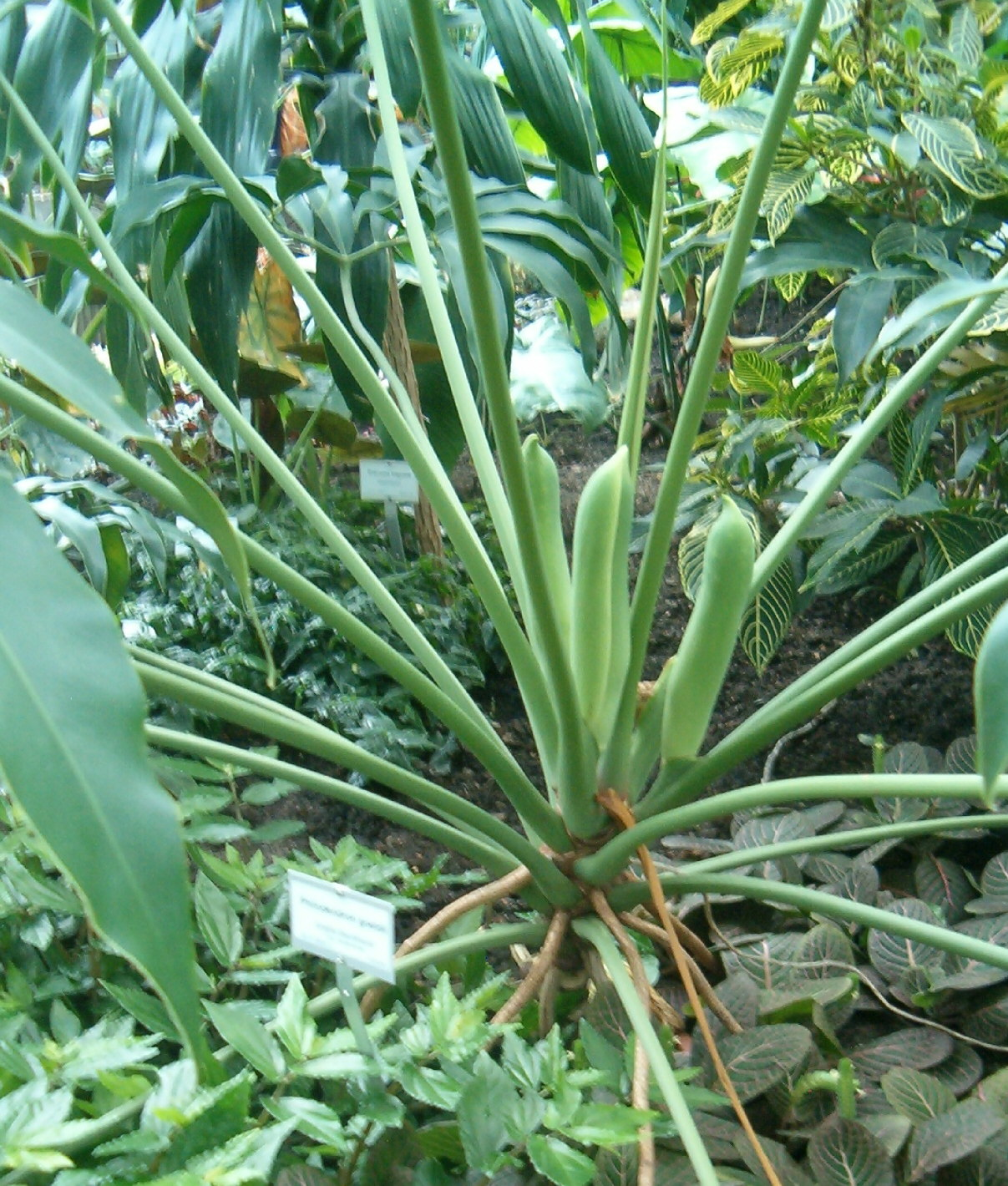
Flowers and petioles

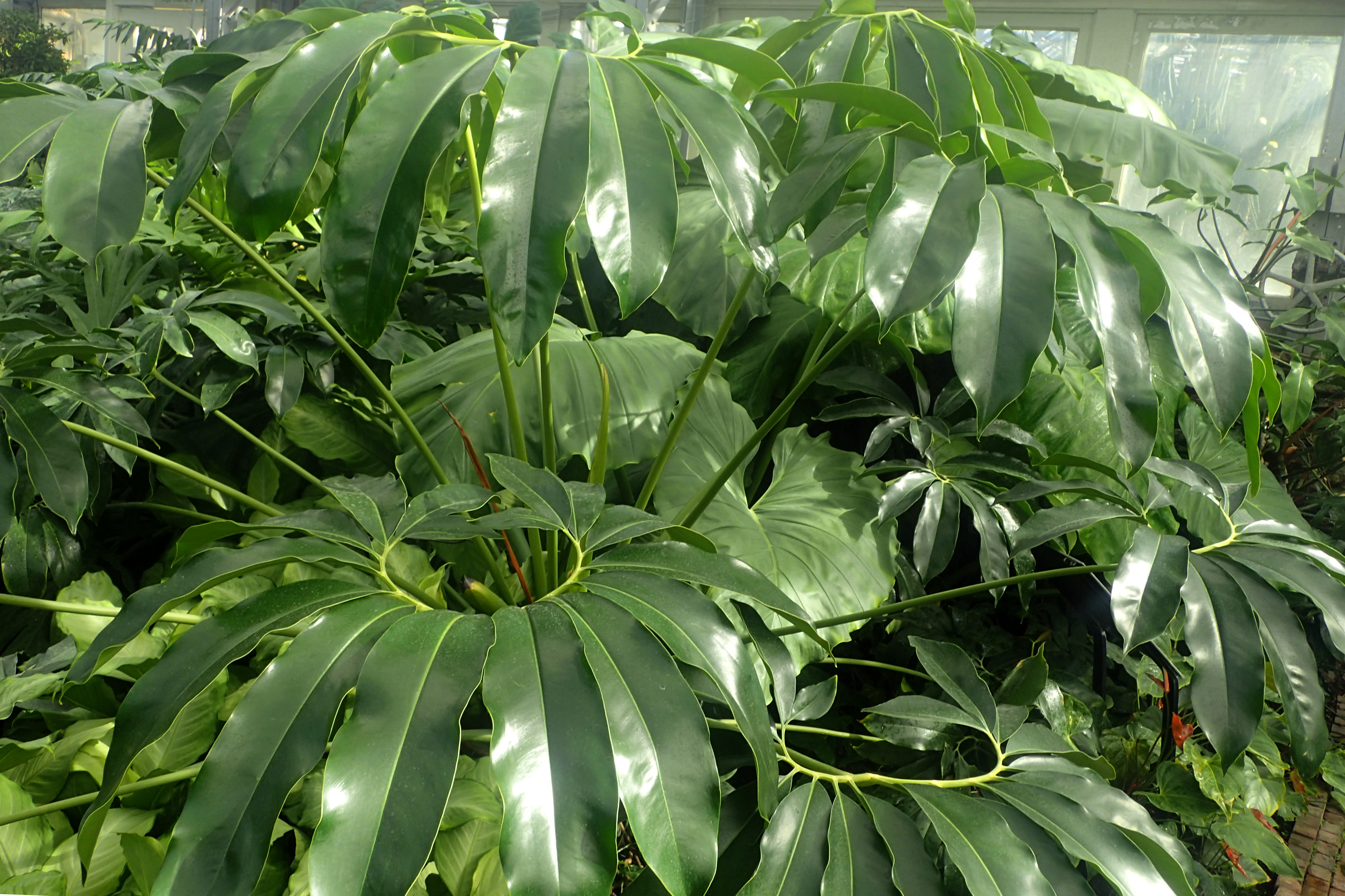
Location taken: Garfield Park Conservatory, Chicago
