= Richard Spruce =

British botanist and explorer (1817–1893)

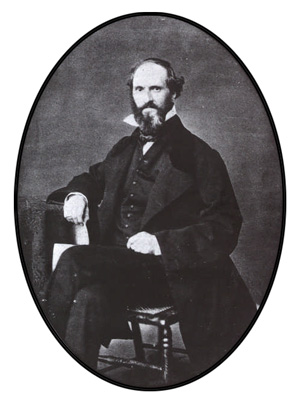
- Richard Spruce 1864 taken upon his return from Brazil
- Born: 10 September 1817; Ganthorpe, near Castle Howard, Yorkshire
- Died: 28 December 1893 (aged 76); Coneysthorpe, Yorkshire
- Known for: Exploration of the Amazon
- Scientific career
- Fields: Botanist specializing in bryology.
- Workplaces: St Peter's School, York
- Author abbrev. (botany): Spruce

Richard Spruce (10 September 1817 – 28 December 1893) was an English botanist specializing in bryology. One of the great Victorian botanical explorers, Spruce spent 15 years exploring the Amazon from the Andes to its mouth, and was one of the very first Europeans to observe many of the places where he collected specimens. Spruce discovered and named a number of new plant species, and corresponded with some of the leading botanists of the nineteenth century.

== Early life and career ==
Richard Spruce was born near Ganthorpe, a small village near Castle Howard in Yorkshire. After training under his father, a local schoolmaster, Spruce began a career as a tutor and then as a mathematics master at St Peter's School in York between 1839 and 1844.

Spruce started his botanical collecting in Yorkshire about 1833. In 1834, at age 16, he drew up a neatly written list of all of the plants he had found on trips around Ganthorpe, focusing on bryophytes. Arranged alphabetically and containing 403 species, the gathering and naming was Spruce's first major contribution to local botany. Three years later he had drawn up a "List of the Flora of the Malton District" containing 485 species of flowering plants. Several of Spruce's localities for the rarer plants are given in Henry Baines's Flora of Yorkshire, published in 1840.

In 1842 Spruce visited Thomas Taylor, an Irish botanist who shared his interest in bryophytes. In 1844 his paper on "The Musci and Hepaticae of Teesdale", the result of a three-week excursion, showed his skill at locating and identifying rare species. In Baines's Flora of Yorkshire only four mosses were recorded from Teesdale. Spruce increased the record to 167 mosses and 41 hepaticae, of which six mosses and one liverwort were new to Britain.

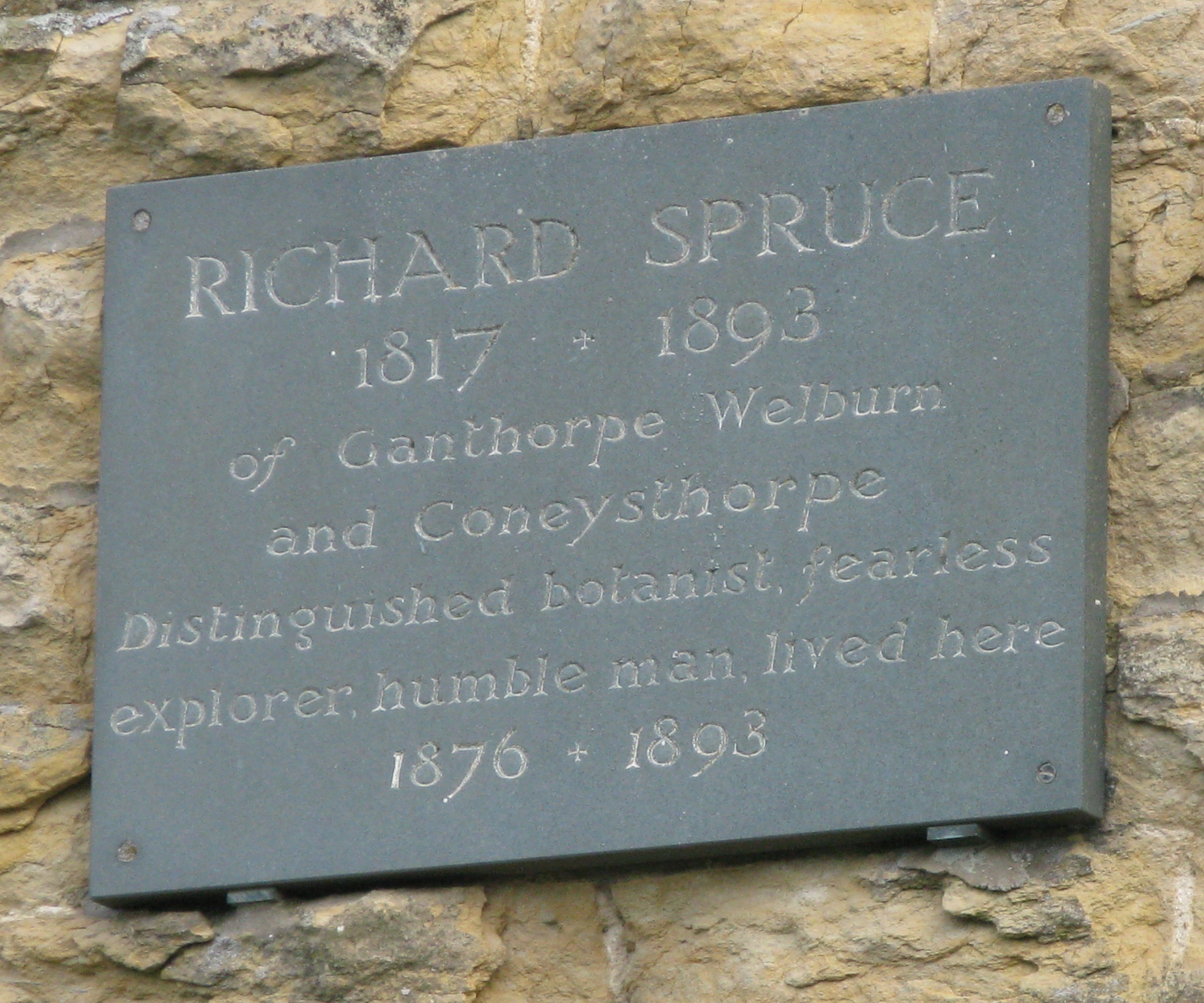
Memorial on the house in Coneysthorpe (North Yorkshire) where Spruce spent his last years

In April, 1845, he published in the London Journal of Botany descriptions of 23 new British mosses, about half of which he had discovered himself. That year he also published his "List of the Musci and Hepaticae of Yorkshire" in The Phytologist. The list included 48 mosses new to the English flora and a further 33 new to Yorkshire.

Spruce came to the attention of William Jackson Hooker, the director of the Royal Botanic Gardens at Kew, and was recommended for a collecting expedition to the Pyrenees, which he undertook in 1845–1846. In 1846 he published "Notes on the Botany of the Pyrenees" and followed it with a more technical article, "The Musci and Hepaticae of the Pyrenees", published in 1849. Spruce issued two exsiccata-like series with specimens from the Pyrenees, i.e. Hepaticae Pyrenaicae, quas in Pyrenaeis centralibus occidentalibusque, nec non in agro Syrtico, A. D. 1845-6 and Musci Pyrenaici, quos in Pyrenaeis centralibus occidentalibusque, nec non in agro Syrtico, A. D. 1845-6. Decerpsit Rich. Spruce (1847).

== Expedition to South America ==
After Spruce proved his botanical skills in the Pyrenees, Hooker proposed a much more challenging expedition to Brazil. The prominent botanist George Bentham would act as broker and distributor of any specimens sent back to England. Despite his fragile health, Spruce accepted the proposal and spent a year at Kew becoming familiar with tropical botany. Spruce arrived at Pará on board the Britannia on 12 July 1849, and traveled up the Amazon River to Santarém where he first met two other young naturalists exploring the Amazon, Alfred Russel Wallace and Henry Walter Bates. Both subsequently well known for their work on natural selection, Wallace and Bates traveled along the tributaries of the Amazon, occasionally crossing paths with and sharing information with Spruce. Within the first two years of his expedition, Spruce had trekked along the full length of the river Trombetas to British Guiana, crossing over the Rio Negro to Manaos.

The plants and objects collected by Spruce from 1849 to 1864 (mostly in Brazil, Ecuador, and Peru) form an important botanical, historical and ethnological resource, and have been indexed at the New York Botanical Garden, at the Royal Botanic Gardens, Kew, London, at Trinity College Dublin, and at the University of Manchester. Some of the material collected by him is widely distributed in exsiccata-like duplicate series; the hepatics, for example, under the title Hepaticae Spruceanae: Amazonicae et Andinae. Towards the end of his expedition through South America, Spruce studied indigenous cultivation of cinchona in the Andes of Peru, then successfully exported seeds and young plants as requested by the government of India. The plant was cultivated to produce quinine, a drug used to prevent malaria.

During the expedition, he also uncovered the Derrotero de Valverde (Valverde's Path), a set of directions supposedly leading to the location of some of the gold intended to ransom Atahualpa.

== Later life ==
By the time of his return to England in 1864, his health was broken and his savings lost to fraud. He spent the last 27 years of his life at Coneysthorpe, Yorkshire, near to where he was born. He received a small pension from the government and continued his botanical studies. He is buried in the churchyard of Terrington.

== Legacy ==
Spruce was honoured in the naming of several taxa of plants;

- Sprucea Wilson & Hook.f. 1845 (Dicranaceae), unaccepted,
- Sprucea Benth. 1853 (Rubiaceae), a synonym of Simira
- Sprucella Steph. 1886 (liverworts, Lepidoziaceae)
- Sprucella Pierre 1890 (Sapotaceae), synonym of Micropholis
- Spruceella Müll.Hal. 1900 (Rhachitheciaceae), synonym of Zanderia Goffinet
- Spruceina Kuntze 1903 (Lepidoziaceae), unaccepted,
- Sprucina Nied. 1908 (Malpighiaceae), synonym of Jubelina
- Spruceanthus Verd. in 1934 (Lejeuneaceae)
- Spruceanthus Sleumer 1936 (Flacourtiaceae), a synonym of Neosprucea
- Neosprucea Sleumer 1938 (Salicaceae)
- Sprucidea M.Cáceres, Aptroot & Lücking 2017 (Lichen, Malmideaceae),
- Thaumatophyllum spruceanum Schott 1859 (Aroid, Araceae), syns: Philodendron spruceanum (Schott) G.M.Barroso, Philodendron goeldii
- Monstera spruceana Schott 1878 Araceae)

He was described as the personal hero of Richard Evans Schultes, a 20th-century ethnobotanist.

== Selected publications ==
- Spruce, Richard (1841). "Three Days on the Yorkshire Moors." Phytologist (i): 101-104.
- Spruce, Richard (1842). "List of Mosses, etc., Collected in Wharfdale, Yorkshire." Phytologist (i): 197-198.
- Spruce, Richard (1842). "Mosses Near Castle Howard." Phytologist (i): 198.
- Spruce, Richard (1844). "The Musci and Hepaticae of Teesdale". Annals of Natural History. 13 (83): 84,
- Spruce, Richard (1845). "A List of Musci and Hepaticae of Yorkshire." Phytologist (ii): 147-157.
- Spruce, Richard (1845). "On Several Mosses New to British Flora." Hooker's London Journal of Botany (iv): 345-347, 535.
- Spruce, Richard (1846). "Notes on the Botany of the Pyrenees." Transactions of the Botanical Society of Edinburgh (iii): 103-216.
- Spruce, Richard (1850). "Mr Spruce's Voyage to Para." Hooker's Journal of Botany (li): 344-347.
- Spruce, Richard (1850). "Botanical Excursion on the Amazon." Hooker's Journal of Botany (li): 65-70.
- Spruce, Richard (1850). "Voyage Up the Amazon River." Hooker's Journal of Botany (li): 173-178.
- Spruce, Richard (1850). "Journal of an Excursion from Santarem, on the Amazon River, to Obidos and the Rio Trombetas." Hooker's Journal of Botany (li).
- Spruce, Richard (1908). Notes of a Botanist on the Amazon & Andes Vol. I-II. Edited by Alfred Russel Wallace. London:Macmillan. https://dx.doi.org/10.5962/bhl.title.17908.

== See also ==
- Category:Taxa named by Richard Spruce
