= Crustospathula amazonica =

Scientific classification
- Domain: Eukaryota
- Kingdom: Fungi
- Division: Ascomycota
- Class: Lecanoromycetes
- Order: Lecanorales
- Family: Malmideaceae
- Genus: Crustospathula
- Species: C. amazonica

Binomial name
- Crustospathula amazonica Aptroot, M.Cáceres & Timdal (2014)

Species of lichen

Crustospathula amazonica is a species of corticolous (bark-dwelling), crustose lichen in the family Ramalinaceae. Found in South America, it was formally described as a new species in 2014 by lichenologists André Aptroot, Marcela Cáceres, and Einar Timdal. The type specimen was collected by the first two authors from the Parque Natural Municipal de Porto Velho (Rondônia, Brazil), where it was found growing on the smooth bark of a tree in a primary rainforest. It also occurs in French Guiana and Peru, and tends to grow in association with lichens of the genus Porina and with thelotremoid members of the family Graphidaceae. The lichen has a film-like, green thallus consisting of fine, aggregated granules; no prothallus is present. Soredia (measuring 15–20 μm in diameter) are whitish, roughly spherical, and occur at the tips of cartilaginous stalks up to 3 mm tall.
