= Astragalus sinuatus =

Conservation status
- Critically Imperiled (NatureServe)

Scientific classification
- Kingdom: Plantae
- Clade: Embryophytes
- Clade: Tracheophytes
- Clade: Angiosperms
- Clade: Eudicots
- Clade: Rosids
- Order: Fabales
- Family: Fabaceae
- Subfamily: Faboideae
- Genus: Astragalus
- Species: A. sinuatus

Binomial name
- Astragalus sinuatus Piper

Species of legume

Astragalus sinuatus is a species of flowering plant in the legume family known by the common name Whited's milkvetch. It is endemic to Washington in the United States, where it is limited to one creek drainage on the western edge of the Columbia Basin. Its range measures about ten square miles in Chelan and Kittitas Counties in the central part of the state.

This perennial herb has stems up to about 45 centimeters long. In April and May it produces yellowish or cream-colored flowers with purple-tinged keels. The fruit is a legume pod which is so tough it sometimes requires pliers to crack it open. The pod is 2.4 to 2.7 centimeters in length.

This plant grows on harsh, dry, rocky land in the shrubsteppe. Other plants in the habitat may include Lupinus sulphureus, Erigeron linearis, Phlox longifolia, Physematium oreganum, Balsamorhiza sagittata, Lomatium dissectum, Lithophragma bulberifera, and Astragalus purshii. Precipitation amounts to only about 9 inches per year.

There are about 8 populations of the plant, totalling about 5000 individuals. Threats to the species include fire suppression, which has led to a buildup of organic matter that facilitates hotter fires when they do occur now. Other threats include habitat loss, invasive species of plants (such as Bromus tectorum), herbicides, and predation of seed pods by insects.
