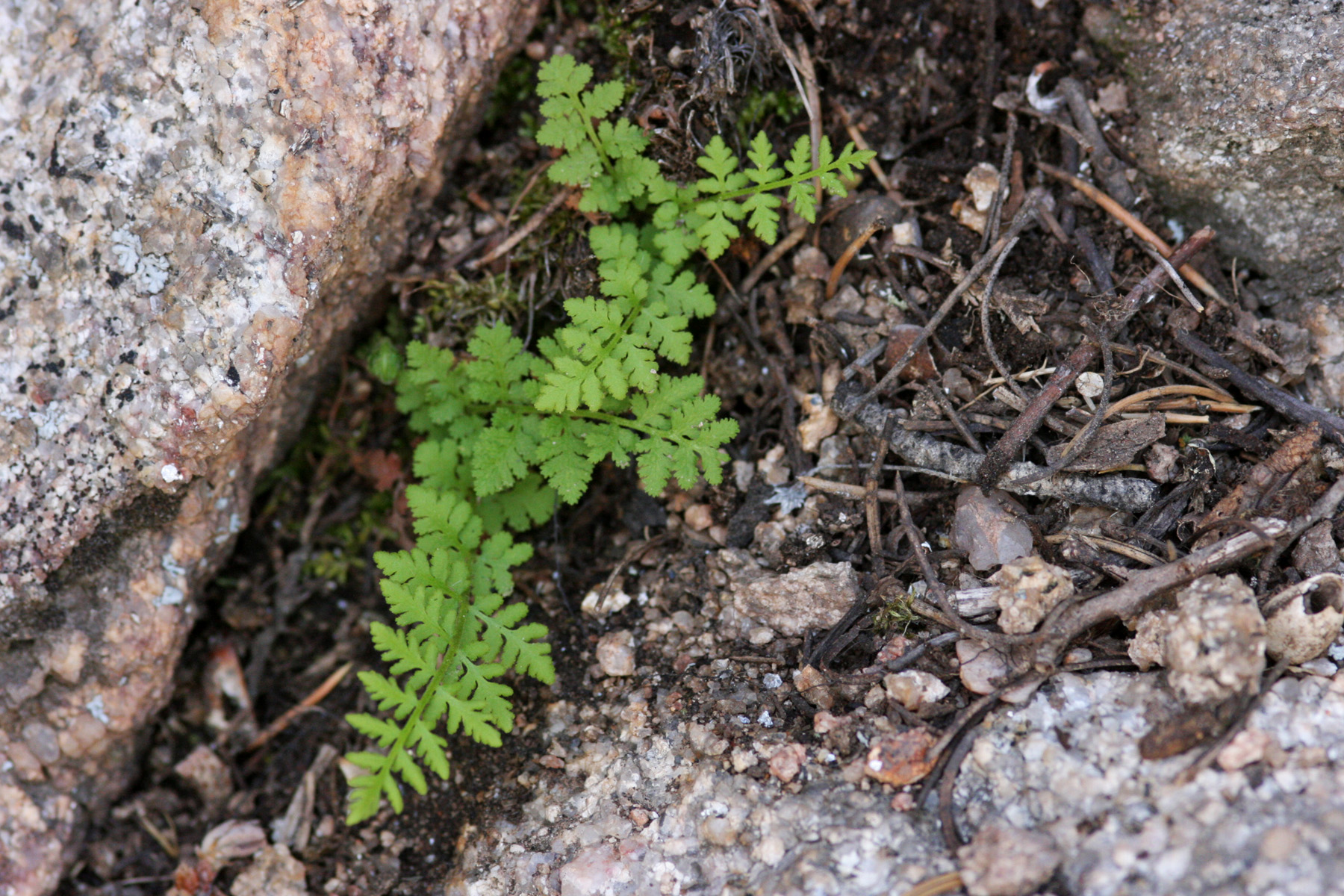

Conservation status
- Secure (NatureServe)

Scientific classification
- Kingdom: Plantae
- Clade: Tracheophytes
- Division: Polypodiophyta
- Class: Polypodiopsida
- Order: Polypodiales
- Suborder: Aspleniineae
- Family: Woodsiaceae
- Genus: Physematium
- Species: P. plummerae

Binomial name
- Physematium plummerae (Lemmon) Li Bing Zhang, N.T.Lu & X.F.Gao

Synonyms
- Woodsia obtusa var. glandulosa D.C.Eaton & Faxon; Woodsia obtusa var. plummerae (Lemmon) Maxon; Woodsia plummerae Lemmon; Woodsia pusilla var. glandulosa (D.C.Eaton & Faxon) T.M.C.Taylor; Woodsiopsis plummerae (Lemmon) Shmakov

= Physematium plummerae =

Species of fern

Physematium plummerae is a species of fern known by the common name Plummer's cliff fern. It is native to the southwestern United States and northern Mexico, where it grows in rocky habitat in deserts and other areas. It has leaves up to 25 centimeters long with flexible reddish or purplish rachises covered in glandular hairs. The blade is made up of several pairs of leaflets which are subdivided into multilobed or toothed small segments.

The species is named in honor of American botanist Sara Plummer Lemmon.
