= Savoronala =

Scientific classification
- Kingdom: Fungi
- Division: Ascomycota
- Class: Lecanoromycetes
- Order: Lecanorales
- Family: Malmideaceae
- Genus: Savoronala; Ertz, Eb.Fisch., Killmann, Razafindr. & Sérus. (2013)
- Species: S. madagascariensis

Binomial name
- Savoronala madagascariensis Ertz, Eb.Fisch., Killmann, Razafindr. & Sérus. (2013)

Lichen genus

Savoronala is a fungal genus in the family Malmideaceae. It is monotypic, containing the single species Savoronala madagascariensis. This lichen produces unique conidia (asexual spores) that each include a single algal cell.

== Taxonomy ==
Both the genus and the specie were described as new in 2013 by Damian Ertz, Eberhard Fischer, Dorothee Killmann, Tahina Razafindrahaja, and Emmanuël Sérusiaux. The type specimen was collected in Tôlanaro, Madagascar, in a coastal Erica-grassland. It was found growing on the stem of an Erica shrub. The lichen is known only from the type locality. The area it was collected from is under pressure because of habitat destruction, charcoal production, and a nearby giant mine of ilmenite.

Molecular phylogenetic analysis showed Savoronala be part of Malmideaceae, a family circumscribed in 2011.

== Description ==
Several features characterize the genus Savoronala. It produces small thalli that are pale glaucous and placodioid (crustose at the centre and lobed at the periphery). The photobiont partner is chlorococcoid green algae. The lichen makes pale cream stipes that bear grayish-blue sporodochia at the tips. Conidia (asexual spores) are associated and dispersed with an algal cell and later become dark brown.
