= The Phytologist =

British botanical periodical in the 19th century

The Phytologist was a British botanical journal, appearing first as Phytologist: a popular botanical miscellany. It was founded in 1841 as a monthly, edited by George Luxford. Luxford died in 1854, and the title was taken over by Alexander Irvine and William Pamplin, who ran it to 1863 with subtitle "a botanical journal".

The proprietor for the first series was Edward Newman, also a contributor. The publisher was John Van Voorst. The journal never made money. Newman used its pages to attack Vestiges of Creation (1844), in an outspoken signed review that stood out from the mass of anonymous comment. Luxford's overall editorial policy, however, gave space to those supporting transmutation of species. The Phytologist, quite unofficially, became the house journal of the Botanical Society of London; and Hewett Watson of the Society a prominent contributor. In the early issues Luxford wrote a series of ten articles on myco-heterotrophy, around Monotropa hypopithys, and prompted sharp debate.

== Contributors ==
- James Backhouse (botanist, 1825–1890)
- John Baker Gilbert
- William Borrer
- William Arnold Bromfield
- Thomas Edmondston
- Edward Forster the Younger
- George Stacey Gibson
- Samuel Gibson
- Amelia Warren Griffiths
- Henry Ibbotson
- Mary Kirby
- George Maw (1832–1912)
- William Mathews
- John Stuart Mill
- William Mitten
- David Moore
- Daniel Oliver
- Edwin John Quekett
- John Ralfs
- John Drew Salmon
- Gerard Edwards Smith
- Richard Spruce
- Hugh Ashworth Stowell
- Thomas Taylor
- George Henry Kendrick Thwaites
- Hewett Cottrell Watson
- Joseph Woods

== New Phytologist ==
New Phytologist was launched by Arthur Tansley in 1902, with a conscious nod to its predecessor.
