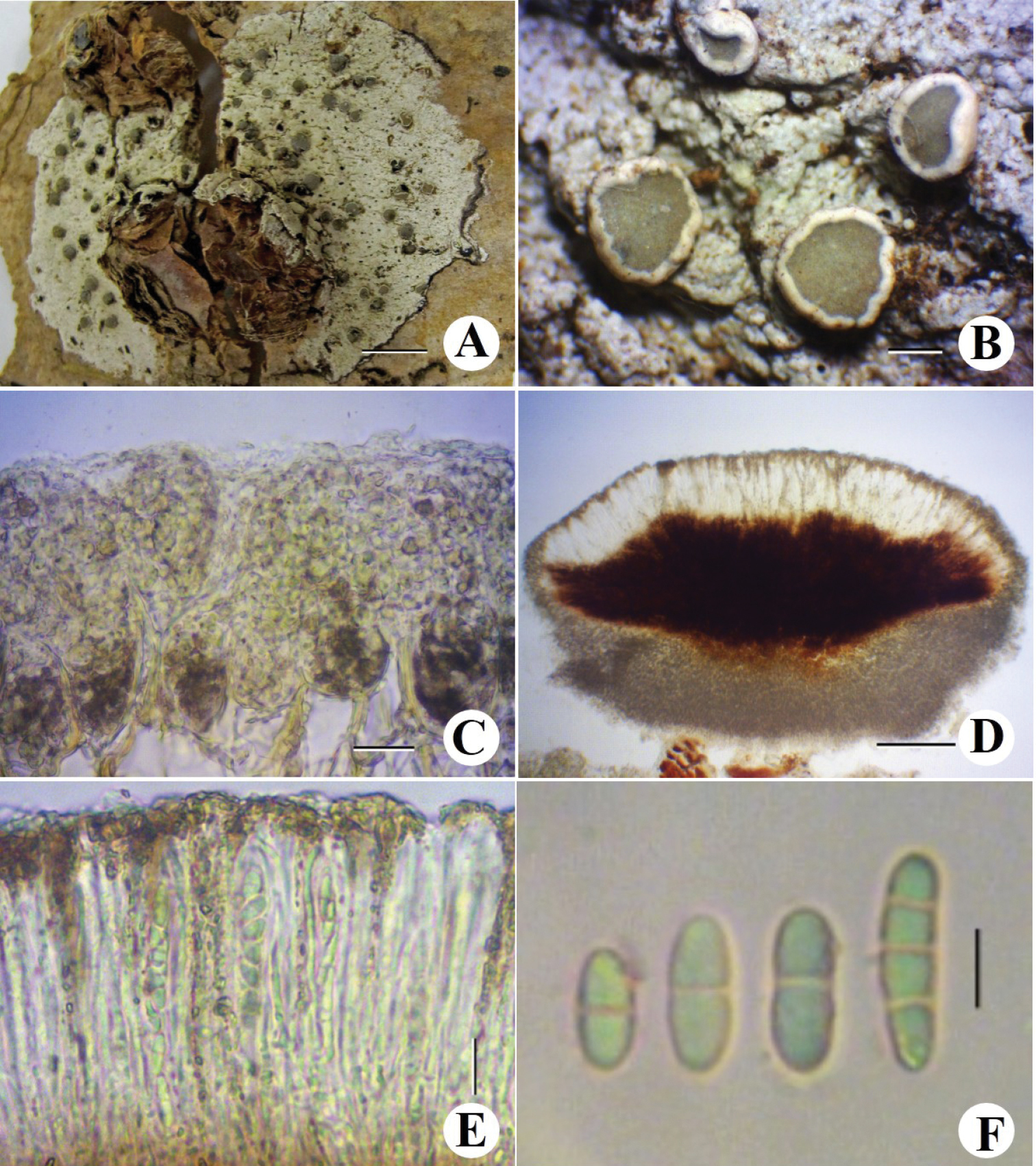
- Kalbionora palaeotropica

Scientific classification
- Domain: Eukaryota
- Kingdom: Fungi
- Division: Ascomycota
- Class: Lecanoromycetes
- Order: Lecanorales
- Family: Malmideaceae
- Genus: Kalbionora; Sodamuk, S.D.Leav. & Lumbsch (2017)

Type species
- Kalbionora palaeotropica Sodamuk, Leavitt & Lumbsch (2017)

= Kalbionora =

Genus of fungi

Kalbionora is a lichen genus in the family Malmideaceae containing the single crustose species Kalbionora palaeotropica. This lichen occurs in coastal forests in Thailand, Vietnam, and northeastern Australia, where it grows on tree bark.

== Taxonomy ==
Kalbionora was circumscribed in 2017 by Mattika Sodamuk, Steven Leavitt, and H. Thorsten Lumbsch to contain a new lichen discovered by Sodamuk in a mangrove forest in eastern Thailand, where it was growing on the bark of Ceriops tagal. The specific epithet refers to the occurrence of the lichen in the paleotropics, while the generic name honours German lichenologist Klaus Kalb.

Although Kalbionora is morphologically quite similar to species from the genus Malmidea or Eugeniella, molecular phylogenetic analysis shows that the species is a distinct lineage within the family Malmideaceae. Its standing as a genus has been accepted in recent large-scale updates of fungal classification.

== Description ==
Kalbionora palaeotropica is a crustose lichen that grows on bark. Its thallus is greenish grey to whitish grey with a continuous surface covered in small wart-like protuberances. A prothallus is not visible, and there are no isidia and soredia. There are eight ascospores per ascus. The spores are hyaline, thin walled, and ellipsoid, measuring 8.9–10.4–11.8 by 3.2–3.8–4.4 μm.
