= Australidea =

Scientific classification
- Domain: Eukaryota
- Kingdom: Fungi
- Division: Ascomycota
- Class: Lecanoromycetes
- Order: Lecanorales
- Family: Malmideaceae
- Genus: Australidea; Kantvilas, Wedin & M.Svenss. (2021)
- Species: A. canorufescens

Binomial name
- Australidea canorufescens (Kremp.) Kantvilas, Wedin & M.Svenss. (2021)

Synonyms
- Lecidea canorufescens Kremp. (1876); Biatora canorufescens (Kremp.) Hellb. (1896); Lecidea intervertens Nyl. (1888)

Single-species genus of lichen

Australidea is a genus in the family Malmideaceae. It is monospecific, containing a single species, the crustose lichen Australidea canorufescens. The genus was circumscribed by Gintaras Kantvilas, Mats Wedin, and Måns Svensson in 2021 to contain the species previously known as Lecidea canorufescens. This lichen is widespread in temperate Australia.
