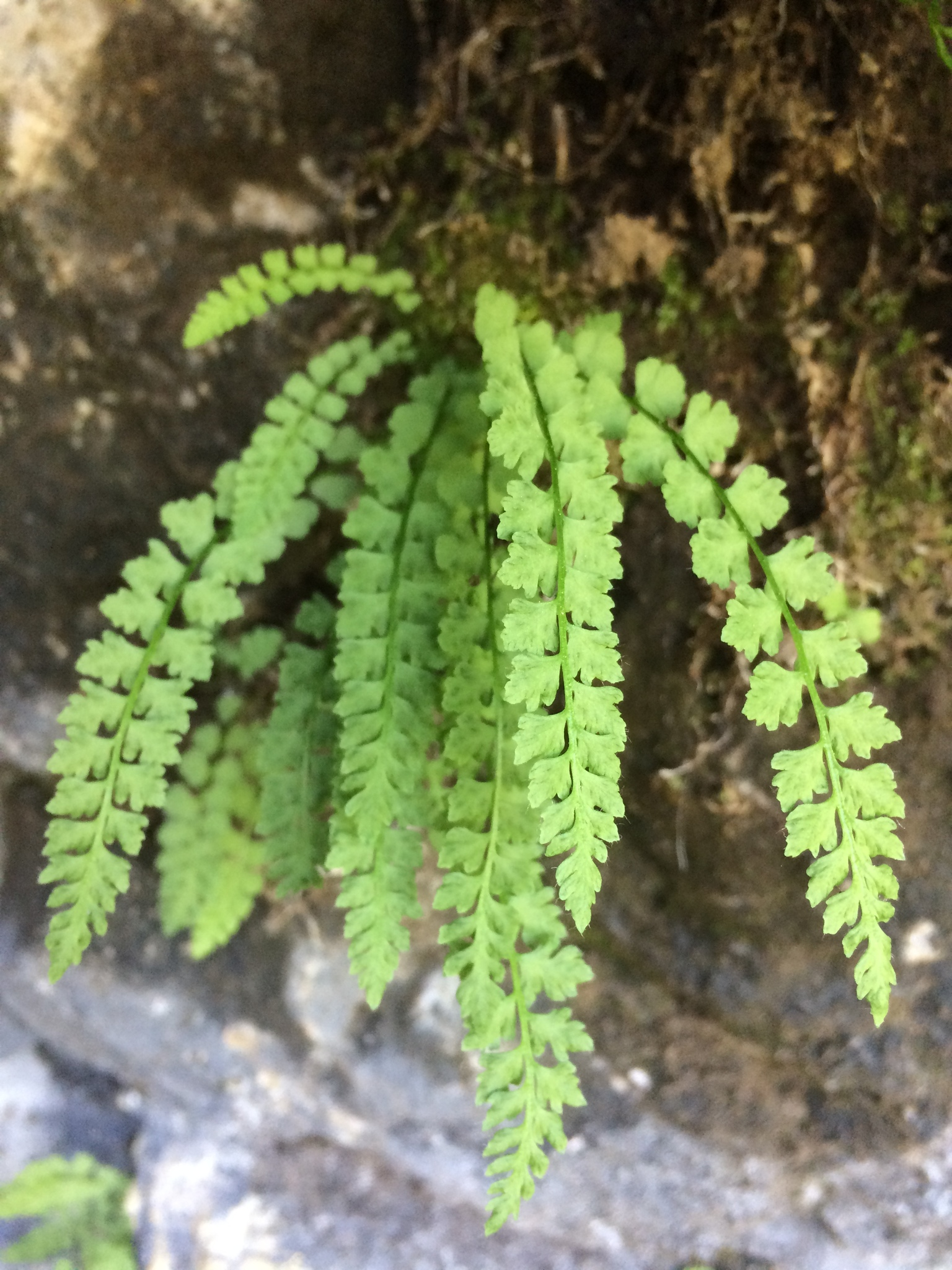

Conservation status
- Least Concern (IUCN 3.1)

Scientific classification
- Kingdom: Plantae
- Clade: Tracheophytes
- Division: Polypodiophyta
- Class: Polypodiopsida
- Order: Polypodiales
- Suborder: Aspleniineae
- Family: Woodsiaceae
- Genus: Woodsia
- Species: W. glabella

Binomial name
- Woodsia glabella R.Br. ex Richardson

= Woodsia glabella =

Species of fern

Woodsia glabella, commonly known as the smooth cliff fern, is a species of homosporous fern. An obligate lithophyte, it is found in the Holarctic realm. It can be found at altitudes of up to 1500–3000 m. The species name glabella is a diminutive of the Latin word glaber, meaning without hair, and refers to the plant's glabrousness.

== Distribution ==
The smooth cliff fern is found across Europe, Asia, and North America.

== Description ==
Woodsia glabella is a small fern with leaf blades 1–1.5 cm wide. It is the smallest species in its genus.
