= Thomas Taylor (botanist) =

English botanist, bryologist, and mycologist (1775–1848)

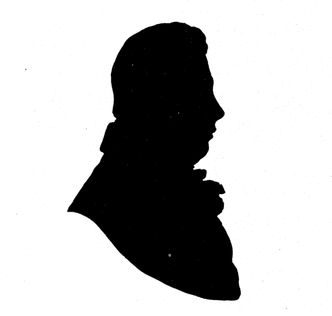
Silhouette of Thomas Taylor

Thomas Taylor (1786–1848) was an Irish botanist, bryologist, and mycologist.

== Life ==
Thomas Taylor, born on a boat on the Ganges, was the eldest son of Joseph Irwin Taylor, colonel in the East Indian army. He was educated at Trinity College, Dublin, graduating B.A. in 1807, and M.B. and M.D. in 1814. He was afterwards elected a fellow of the King and Queen's College of Physicians, and during his residence in Dublin acted as physician in ordinary to Sir Patrick Dun's Hospital.

He acted as professor of botany and natural history in the Royal Cork Scientific Institution as long as that institution lasted, and then retired to Dunkerron, near Kenmare, County Kerry. Here his medical knowledge and his purse were freely used for his poorer neighbours during the famine winter of 1847–8, and here he died early in February 1848. Taylor was elected a fellow of the Linnean Society in 1814, and was also an honorary member of the Royal Irish Academy. His botanical researches were mainly among the mosses, liverworts, and lichens.

Besides Muscologia Britannica, which he published in conjunction with Sir William Jackson Hooker in 1818 (2nd ed. 1827), he wrote much cryptogamic matter for the Flora Antarctica of Joseph Dalton Hooker, and is credited with twenty-three papers, four written in conjunction with that botanist (Roy. Soc. Cat. v. 923–4). These include an important memoir, De Marchanteis, in the Transactions of the Linnean Society, and contributions to the Transactions of the Botanical Society of Edinburgh, The Phytologist, Hooker's Journal of Botany, and the Annals and Magazine of Natural History. His herbarium of over eight thousand sheets and his drawings were purchased at his death by John Amory Lowell of Boston, Mass., and presented by him to the Boston Society of Natural History.

His name was commemorated by Sir William Hooker in the genus Tayloria belonging to the mosses.

== See also ==
- Category:Taxa named by Thomas Taylor (botanist)

== Sources ==
"Taylor, Thomas (d.1848)" . Dictionary of National Biography. London: Smith, Elder & Co. 1885–1900.
