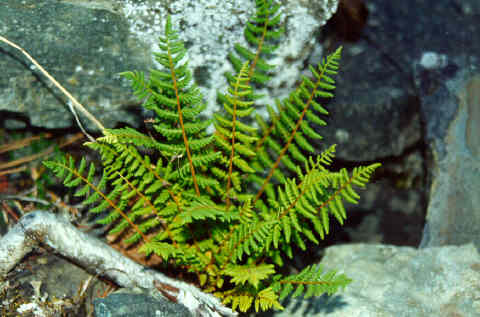
- Physematium oreganum

Scientific classification
- Kingdom: Plantae
- Clade: Tracheophytes
- Division: Polypodiophyta
- Class: Polypodiopsida
- Order: Polypodiales
- Suborder: Aspleniineae
- Family: Woodsiaceae
- Genus: Physematium; Kaulf.

Type species
- Physematium molle Kaulfuss

Species
- See text

Synonyms
- Cheilanthopsis Hieronymus 1920; Hymenocystis Meyer 1831; Protowoodsia Ching 1945; Woodsiopsis Shmakov 2015

= Physematium =

Genus of plants

Physematium is a genus of ferns in the family Woodsiaceae. It was treated as a synonym of Woodsia until 2020 when a molecular phylogenetic study showed its distinctiveness. As of June 2023, Plants of the World Online continued to treat the genus as a synonym of Woodsia.

== Phylogeny ==
As of June 2023, World Ferns accepted 20 species and two hybrids:

Phylogeny from Fern Tree of Life

- Physematium
  - - (Cheilanthopsis)
      - - P. elongatum (Hooker) Trevis.
        - P. indusiosum (Christ) Li Bing Zhang, N.T.Lu & X.F.Gao
      - - P. kangdingense (H.S.Kung, Li Bing Zhang & X.S.Guo) Li Bing Zhang, N.T.Lu & X.F.Gao
        - P. manchuriense (Hook.) Nakai
  - - (Physematium)
      - P. fragile (Trevis.) Kunze
      - - P. scopulinum Trevis.
        - - P. molle Kaulf.
          - P. montevidense (Spreng.) Shmakov
    - (Woodsiopsis)
      - - P. oreganum (D.C.Eaton) Trevis.
        - - P. obtusum (Spreng.) Hook.
          - P. plummerae (Lemmon) Li Bing Zhang, N.T.Lu & X.F.Gao
      - - - P. cochisense (Windham) Zhang, Lu & Gao
          - P. phillipsii (Windham) Li Bing Zhang, N.T.Lu & X.F.Gao
        - - P. cystopteroides (Windham & Mickel) Zhang, Lu & Gao
          - P. neomexicanum (Windham) Li Bing Zhang, N.T.Lu & X.F.Gao

Other species include:
- P. angolense (Schelpe) Shmakov
- P. burgessianum (Gerrard ex Hooker & Baker) Shmakov
- P. canescens (Kunze) Trevis.
- P. × kansanum (R.E.Brooks) Li Bing Zhang, N.T.Lu & X.F.Gao
- P. × maxonii (R.M.Tryon) Li Bing Zhang, N.T.Lu & X.F.Gao
- P. mexicanum (Fée) comb.ined.
- P. pubescens (Spreng.) Bevis
