= William Arnold Bromfield =

English botanist (1801–1851)

William Arnold Bromfield (1801–1851), was an English botanist.

Bromfield was born at Boldre, in the New Forest, Hampshire, in 1801, his father, the Rev. John Arnold Bromfield, dying in the same year. He received his early training under Dr. Knox of Tunbridge, Dr. Nicholas of Baling, and Rev. Mr. Phipps, a Warwickshire clergyman. He entered Glasgow University in 1821, and two years later he took his degree in medicine. During his university career he first showed a liking for botany, and made an excursion into the Scottish Highlands in quest of plants.

He left Scotland in 1826, and, being independent of professional earnings, travelled through Germany, Italy, and France, returning to England in 1830. His mother died shortly afterwards, and he lived with his sister at Hastings and at Southampton, and finally settled at Ryde in 1836. He published in The Phytologist some observations on Hampshire plants, and then began to amass materials for a Flora of the Isle of Wight, which he did not consider complete even after fourteen years of assiduous labour. In 1842 he spent some weeks in Ireland, and in January 1844 he started for a six months' tour to the West Indies, spending most of the time in Trinidad and Jamaica. Two years later he visited North America, publishing some remarks in Hooker's Journal of Botany.

In September 1850 he embarked for the East, and spent some time in Egypt, penetrating as far as Khartoum, which he described in a letter as a 'region of dust, dirt, and barbarism.' Here he lost two of his companions, victims to the climate, and he returned to Cairo in the following June, after an absence of seven months. Continuing his journey, he passed by Jaffa, and stated his intention of leaving Constantinople for Southampton in September, but his last letter was dated "Bairout, 22 Sept.," when he was expecting a friend to join him on a trip to Baalbec and Damascus. At the latter place he was attacked by malignant typhus, and died on 9 Oct., four days after his arrival. His collections were sent to Kew, some of the contents being shared amongst his scientific friends. The Flora of the Isle of Wight was printed by Sir W. J. Hooker and Dr. Bell Salter in 1856, under the title of Flora Vectensis, in 8vo, with a topographical map and portrait of the author. His manuscript Flora of Hampshire was never published. His herbarium is now at Ryde in the Isle of Wight, but his manuscripts are in the library of the Royal Kew Gardens.
