= Crustospathula =

Scientific classification
- Domain: Eukaryota
- Kingdom: Fungi
- Division: Ascomycota
- Class: Lecanoromycetes
- Order: Lecanorales
- Family: Malmideaceae
- Genus: Crustospathula; Aptroot (1998)

Type species
- Crustospathula cartilaginea Aptroot (1998)

Species
- C. amazonica C. cartilaginea C. humboldtii C. khaoyaiana C. macrocarpa

Genus of fungi

Crustospathula is a genus of five species of crustose lichens in the family Malmideaceae. They are characterized by their stalked and sometimes branched cartilaginous soredia and Bacidia-like apothecia.

== Taxonomy ==
Crustospathula was circumscribed by lichenologist André Aptroot in 1998, with Crustospathula cartilaginea as the type species. This species was discovered by Aptroot in Madang Province, Papua New Guinea in an undisturbed tropical lowland rain forest. It was, according to Aptroot, the known instance of a crustose lichen with stalked, cartilaginous, labriform soralia. For this reason, it could not be assigned to any known genera, and Crustospathula was created to hold it. Aptroot initially assigned the genus tentatively to the family Bacidiaceae, because of the resemblance of generative structures with certain species of Bacidia. It was later in the Ramalinaceae, until molecular phylogenetic analysis determined that its true placement belonged in the Malmideaceae.

== Description ==
Crustospathula species are crustose with stalked and cartilaginous soredia that are labriform (lip-shaped) or crenately (scalloped) lobed. The ascospores are rod-shaped and often curved or bent. They contain between 0 and 3 septa, and measure 20–25 by 0.8–1.5 um.

The lichens contain the secondary compounds atranorin and 2'-O-methylperlatolic acid.

== Species ==
- Crustospathula amazonica Aptroot, M.Cáceres & Timdal (2014) – Brazil
- Crustospathula cartilaginea Aptroot (1998) – Papua New Guinea
- Crustospathula humboldtii Kalb (2011) – Venezuela
- Crustospathula khaoyaiana Kalb & Mongk. (2012) – Thailand
- Crustospathula macrocarpa Aptroot & Schumm (2009) – Philippines
