= George Luxford =

English botanist, printer and journalist

George Luxford (7 April 1807 – 12 June 1854) was an English botanist, printer and journalist.

== Life ==
Luxford was born at Sutton, Surrey on 7 April 1807. At age 11 he was apprenticed to Allingham, a printer in Reigate, with whom he remained 16 years, and where he studied.

In 1834 Luxford moved to Birmingham. His obituary notice in The Phytologist states he worked there in the printing and engraving business of "Mr. Allen". Under the legislation of the time, a printer had to apply for the licensing of a new press; and in April 1845 Josiah Allen of Birmingham, brother of James Baylis Allen, submitted an application witnessed by "Geo. Luxford" for a recent press. (Business partners could and did act as witnesses.) Luxford was elected an associate of the Linnean Society in 1836.

Returning south in 1837, Luxford started in business as a printer in London the next year, and shortly was given a contract by Longmans, to print a magazine edited by John Claudius Loudon. In 1838 he became a Fellow of the Botanical Society of Edinburgh, with address on Ratcliffe Highway; he was also a member of the Botanical Society of London. In 1841 he took on the editorship of The Phytologist for Edward Newman, who that year bought his printing business.

For some years Luxford was sub-editor of the Westminster Review. He was also associated with The Globe, in 1844–5. According to Rosemary Ashton, as publisher also of the Westminster Review, Luxford made false accounts to the owner, William Edward Hickson, who sold out to John Chapman in 1851.

From 1846 to 1851 Luxford was lecturer on botany in St. Thomas's Hospital. He worked on The Phytologist, in the capacity of compositor and reader, until his death on 12 June 1854, at Walworth.

== Works ==
- A Flora of the neighbourhood of Reigate, Surrey, containing the flowering plants and ferns, 1838.

Reviews by Luxford in the Westminster Review, by convention unsigned, have been attributed:

- Popular Works on Natural History in 1845;
- Of A History of British Ferns, 1847;
- Of Birds of Jamaica by Philip Gosse;
- Of Illustrations of Instinct by Jonathan Couch;
- Of Lecture on Instinct by Richard Whately;
- Of Vestiges of Creation, sixth edition 1847;
- Of John Lindley's Vegetable Kingdom and other works, including Natural Systems of Botany by James Lawson Drummond, in 1850, attacking in particular the Linnaean system. Drummond replied in 1851 in The Phytologist.

The standard author abbreviation Luxf. is used to indicate this person as the author when citing a botanical name.
