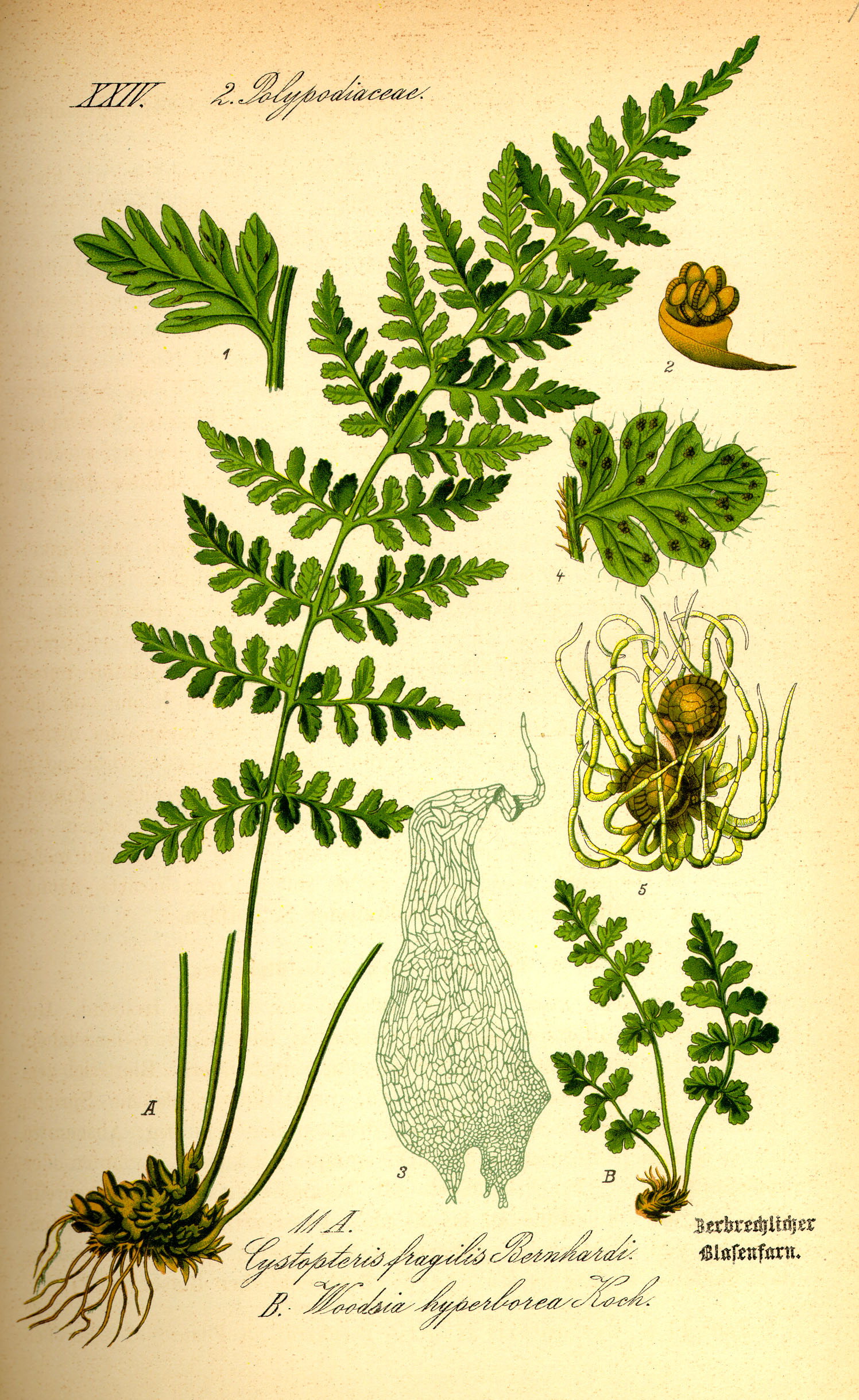
- Woodsia alpina

Scientific classification
- Kingdom: Plantae
- Clade: Tracheophytes
- Division: Polypodiophyta
- Class: Polypodiopsida
- Order: Polypodiales
- Suborder: Aspleniineae
- Family: Woodsiaceae; Herter
- Genus: Woodsia; R.Br.

Type species
- Woodsia ilvensis (von Linné) Brown

Species
- See text

Synonyms
- Eriosoriopsis (Kitagawa 1935) Ching & Wu 1991; Trichocyclus Dulac 1867 non N.E. Br. 1922

= Woodsia =

Genus of ferns

Woodsia is a genus of ferns in the family Woodsiaceae. Species of Woodsia are commonly known as cliff ferns. In the Pteridophyte Phylogeny Group classification of 2016 (PPG I), it was the only genus in the family Woodsiaceae. In 2020, Physematium was split off from Woodsia on the basis of molecular phylogenetic evidence. As of June 2023, Plants of the World Online continued to treat Physematium as a synonym of Woodsia.

== Phylogeny ==
There are about 25–30 species of the genus Woodsia. As of June 2023, World Ferns hosted at World Plants accepted the following species:

Phylogeny from Fern Tree of Life

- Woodsia
  - (Eriosorus)
    - W. lanosa Hook.
    - - W. okamotoi Tagawa
      - - W. cycloloba Hand.-Mazz.
        - W. kungiana Li Bing Zhang, N.T.Lu & X.F.Gao
  - (Woodsia)
    - - section Eriosoriopsis
        - W. guizhouensis P.S.Wang, Q.Luo & Li Bing Zhang
        - W. rosthorniana Diels
    - - - section Alpinae
          - Woodsia glabella R.Br. (smooth cliff fern)
          - - Woodsia alpina (Bolton) Gray (alpine woodsia)
            - W. shensiensis Ching
      - - section Woodsia
          - W. andersonii (Bedd.) Christ
          - - Woodsia ilvensis (L.) R.Br. (oblong woodsia, rusty cliff fern)
            - - W. gorovoii Krestsch. & Shmakov
              - W. macrochlaena Mett. ex Kuhn
        - section Subcordatae
          - W. oblonga Ching & S.H.Wu
          - - W. subcordata Turcz.
            - - W. polystichoides D.C.Eaton
              - W. subintermedia Tzvelev

Other species include:
- W. asiatica Kiselev & Shmakov
- W. calcarea (Fomin) Shmakov
- W. cinnamomea Christ
- W. hancockii Baker
- W. macrospora C.Chr. & Maxon
- W. nikkoensis H.Ogura & Nakaike
- W. pilosa Ching
- †W. pseudomanchuriensis Akhmetiev
- W. pseudopolystichoides (Fomin) Kiselev & Shmakov
- W. pulchella Bertol.
- W. sinica Ching
- W. taigischensis (Stepanov) Kuznetsov
- W. taishanensis F.Z.Li & C.K.Ni

Some hybrids are also known:

- Woodsia × gracilis (G.Lawson) Butters = W. alpina × W. ilvensis
- Woodsia × tryonis B.Boivin = W. ilvensis × W. glabella

When the genus Physematium is accepted, × Woodsimatium abbeae is a hybrid between Woodsia ilvensis and Physematium scopulinum.
