= Multisporidea =

Scientific classification
- Domain: Eukaryota
- Kingdom: Fungi
- Division: Ascomycota
- Class: Lecanoromycetes
- Order: Lecanorales
- Family: Malmideaceae
- Genus: Multisporidea; Kalb & Aptroot (2021)
- Species: M. nitida

Binomial name
- Multisporidea nitida Kalb & Aptroot (2021)

Species of lichen

Multisporidea is a fungal genus in the family Malmideaceae. It is monotypic, containing the single species Multisporidea nitida, a corticolous lichen found in Réunion. The lichen has a dull, whitish to pale pinkish-brown thallus that is sometimes bordered by a black hypothallus measuring up to 0.3 mm wide. The lichen is unreactive to standard chemical spot tests, and no lichen substances are detected with thin-layer chromatography.

== Taxonomy ==
Both the species and the genus were erected in 2021 by lichenologists Klaus Kalb and André Aptroot. The type was collected in the Cirque de Cilaos, where it was found growing on tree bark in the remnant of a rain forest, at an altitude of 1,450 m (4,760 ft). The specific epithet nitida refers to the glossy apothecia, while the generic name alludes to the multi-spored asci.

== Description ==
Multisporidea nitida grows as a thin, dull crust (thallus) that is whitish to pale pink-brown and scarcely thicker than a sheet of paper (about 0.05–0.1 mm). The surface is minutely cracked but otherwise featureless, and some colonies develop a narrow black fringe (hypothallus) up to 0.3 mm wide as they spread across bark. Its photosynthetic partner is a microscopic green alga with spherical cells typical of the chlorococcoid group.

The fruiting bodies (apothecia) sit directly on the crust yet look pinched where they meet it, so they resemble tiny turrets 0.3–1.7 mm across. Their glossy discs are chocolate-brown, initially flat then slightly domed, and never dusted with a pale bloom. Encircling rims are darker, often wavy and conspicuously covered in wart-like bumps. In section the outer wall (excipulum) and the supporting layer beneath (hypothecium) are both dark brown, while the spore-bearing tissue (hymenium) is about 125 micrometres (μm) high and faintly tinged brown. Each ascus contains an unusually large crop of ascospores—16 to 32 instead of the more common eight—and its tip carries a small, tube-shaped, starch-positive structure that marks the family Malmideaceae. The spores themselves are nearly spherical, colourless, 4–6 μm across and lack any gelatinous envelope. No asexual reproductive organs (pycnidia) or characteristic lichen products have been detected, and standard chemical spot tests give negative results.
