= Cheiromycina =

Scientific classification
- Domain: Eukaryota
- Kingdom: Fungi
- Division: Ascomycota
- Class: Lecanoromycetes
- Order: Lecanorales
- Family: Malmideaceae
- Genus: Cheiromycina; B.Sutton (1986)

Type species
- Cheiromycina flabelliformis B.Sutton (1986)

Genus of lichen-forming fungi

Cheiromycina is a genus of lichen-forming fungi belonging to the family Malmideaceae.

The genus has an almost cosmopolitan distribution.

Species:

- Cheiromycina flabelliformis B.Sutton (1986)
- Cheiromycina globosa Aptroot & Schiefelb. (2003)
- Cheiromycina petri D.Hawksw. & Poelt (1990)
- Cheiromycina reimeri Printzen (2007)
