= Sprucidea =

Scientific classification
- Kingdom: Fungi
- Division: Ascomycota
- Class: Lecanoromycetes
- Order: Lecanorales
- Family: Malmideaceae
- Genus: Sprucidea; M.Cáceres, Aptroot & Lücking (2017)

Type species
- Sprucidea rubropenicillata M.Cáceres, Aptroot & Lücking (2017)

Species
- S. granulosa S. gymnopiperis S. penicillata S. rubropenicillata S. squamulosa

Genus of lichen-forming fungi

Sprucidea is a genus of five crustose lichens in the family Malmideaceae. Similar to the related genus Malmidea, Sprucidea is characterized by frequently red thalli that contain the secondary compound norsolorinic acid, but differs in the rod-shaped instead of ellipsoid ascospores and in the stalked sporodochia as conidiomata. Sprucidea species are found in rainforest areas in South America and Southeast Asia.

== Taxonomy ==
Sprucidea was circumscribed in 2017 by lichenologists Marcela Cáceres, André Aptroot, and Robert Lücking. S. granulosa and the type species, S. rubropenicillata, were described as new to science, while S. gymnopiperis and S. penicillata were two proposed new combinations from the genera Malmidea and Bacidina, respectively. S. squamulosa was added to the genus in 2023.

The genus name of Sprucidea is in honour of Richard Spruce (1817–1893), who was an English botanist specializing in bryology. He was one of the great Victorian botanical explorers.

== Description ==
Sprucidea lichens are corticolous species that inhabit tropical rainforests. They have a crustose thallus, with or without isidia. The hypothallus and to a lesser extent other parts are often coloured with the red pigment norsolorinone. Apothecia are sessile, often becoming convex in shape. The ascospores are rod-shaped (bacillary), and hyaline. Conidia are on stalked sporodochia.
