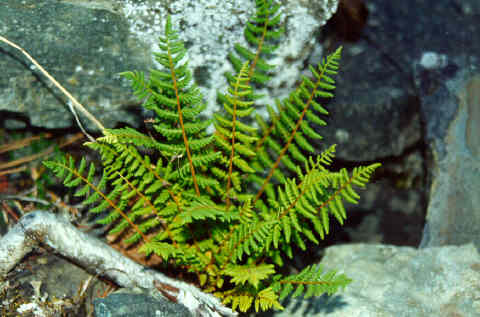

Conservation status
- Secure (NatureServe)

Scientific classification
- Kingdom: Plantae
- Clade: Tracheophytes
- Division: Polypodiophyta
- Class: Polypodiopsida
- Order: Polypodiales
- Suborder: Aspleniineae
- Family: Woodsiaceae
- Genus: Physematium
- Species: P. oreganum

Binomial name
- Physematium oreganum (D.C. Eaton) Trevis.

Synonyms
- Woodsia oregana D.C.Eaton; Woodsiopsis oregana (D.C.Eaton) Shmakov

= Physematium oreganum =

Species of fern

Physematium oreganum, the Oregon cliff fern, is a deciduous perennial fern in the family Woodsiaceae. This plant is native to a large part of the western and northern United States and much of Canada.

== Description ==
Physematium oreganum leaves (fronds) are twice pinnate to pinnate-pinnatifid (second leaf division not complete to base) growing from a short scaly rhizome. Individual plants sometimes appear as a single clump, but may form an elongated mass when the rhizome is longer. The leaves are up to 25 cm long and 12 cm wide and are held upright to angled. The rachis may have sparse very short glandular hairs, but it is distinguishable from the similar Physematium scopulinum by a lack of long hairs on the rachis (stem). Small round sori on the underside of pinnae are initially partly covered with a narrowly lobed indusium.

== Habitat and Range ==
Physematium oreganum is usually found in open rocky areas and on rock outcrops. It grows widely in the western United States and southwestern Canada, and is present in more scattered locations further east.

== Gallery ==
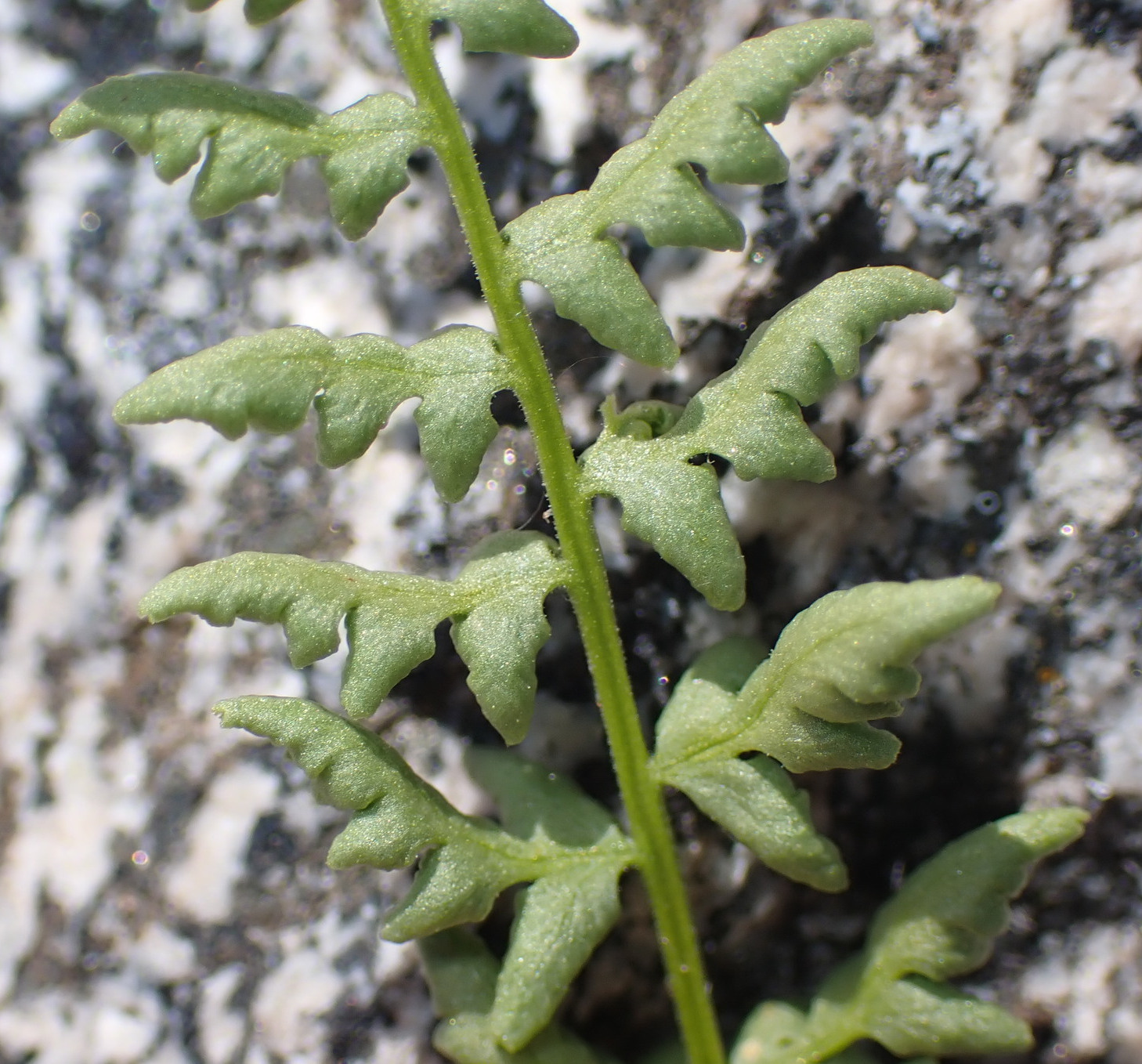
Leaf closeup

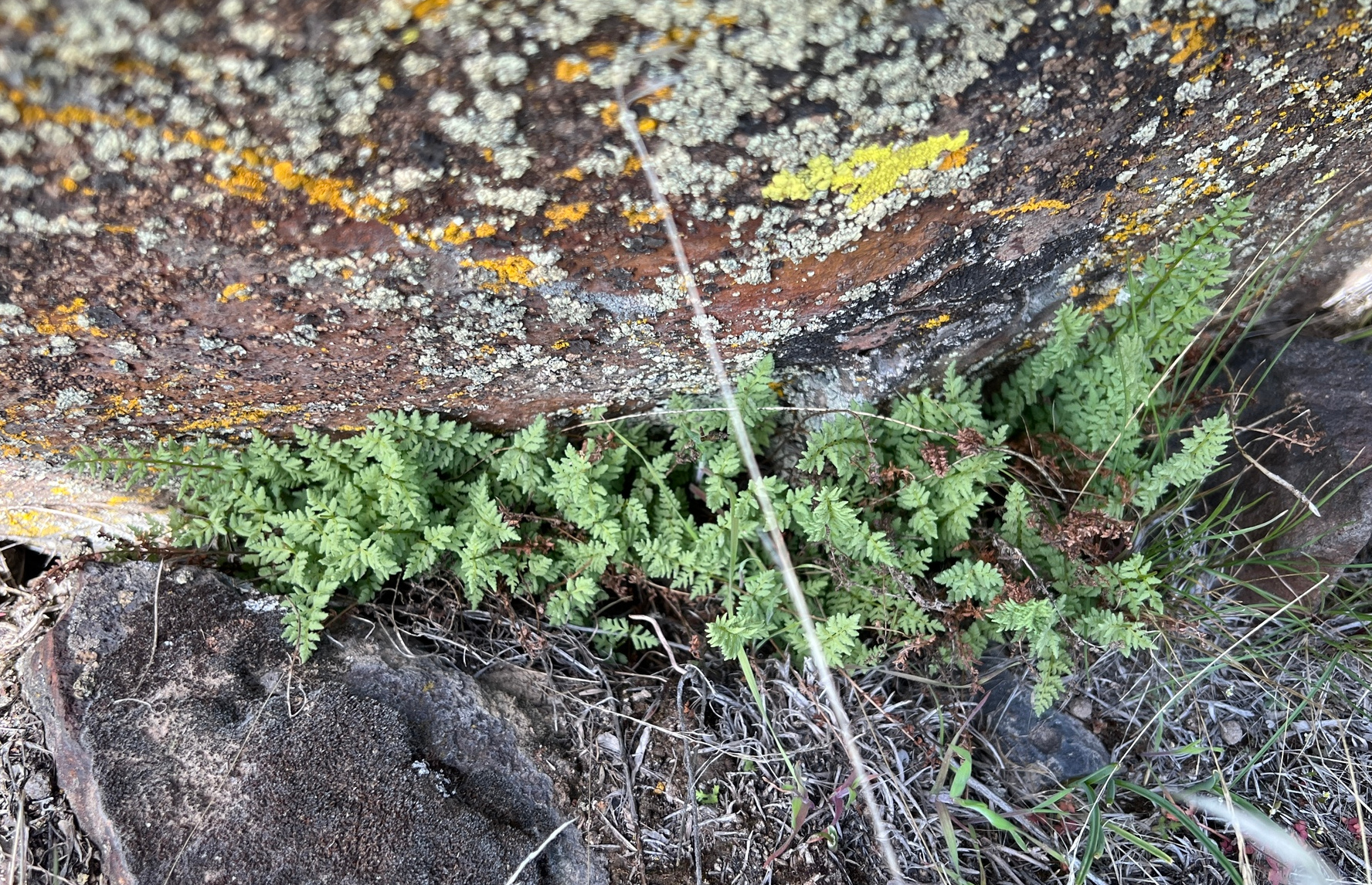
Habitat, central WA
