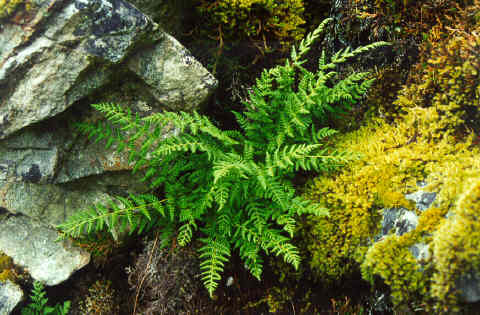

Conservation status
- Secure (NatureServe)

Scientific classification
- Kingdom: Plantae
- Clade: Tracheophytes
- Division: Polypodiophyta
- Class: Polypodiopsida
- Order: Polypodiales
- Suborder: Aspleniineae
- Family: Woodsiaceae
- Genus: Physematium
- Species: P. scopulinum

Binomial name
- Physematium scopulinum Trevis.

Synonyms
- Woodsia obtusa f. nana (Lemmon ex Gilbert) Clute; Woodsia obtusa var. lyallii Hook.; Woodsia obtusa var. nana Lemmon ex Gilbert; Woodsia oregana var. lyallii (Hook.) B.Boivin; Woodsia scopulina D.C.Eaton; Woodsia scopulina f. nana (Lemmon) M.Broun; Woodsiopsis scopulina (D.C.Eaton) Shmakov

= Physematium scopulinum =

Species of fern

Physematium scopulinum, also called Woodsia scopulina, is a deciduous perennial fern in the family Woodsiaceae, with the common name Rocky Mountain woodsia.

This plant is native to the western and northern United States and Canada. W. scopulina is a small to medium sized fern, 10-30 centimeters high, which grows in mesic to dry rock crevices.

== Description ==
Physematium scopulinum has twice pinnate fronds arising from a short scaly rhizome. The mostly upright fronds are 10–30 cm in length and up to 8 cm in width and are medium to pale green in color. The pinnae and rachis are sparsely to moderately covered with long hairs that protrude sharply (not appressed to stem), some with a globular gland at the tip. The hairy rachis distinguishes it from the similar species Physematium oreganum. The rachis is grooved on top (adaxially). Small round sori on the underside of pinnae are initially partly covered with a narrowly lobed indusium. New leaves show circinate vernation (tightly curled).

== Range ==
Physematium scopulinum is widespread in mountains near the west coast of North America from southern Alaska to southern California, and in the Rocky Mountains from British Columbia to Colorado. There are also isolated populations in northeastern North America.

== Habitat ==
Physematium scopulinum is commonly found in sunny rocky habitats including rock crevices, talus slopes, and rock ledges.

== Gallery ==
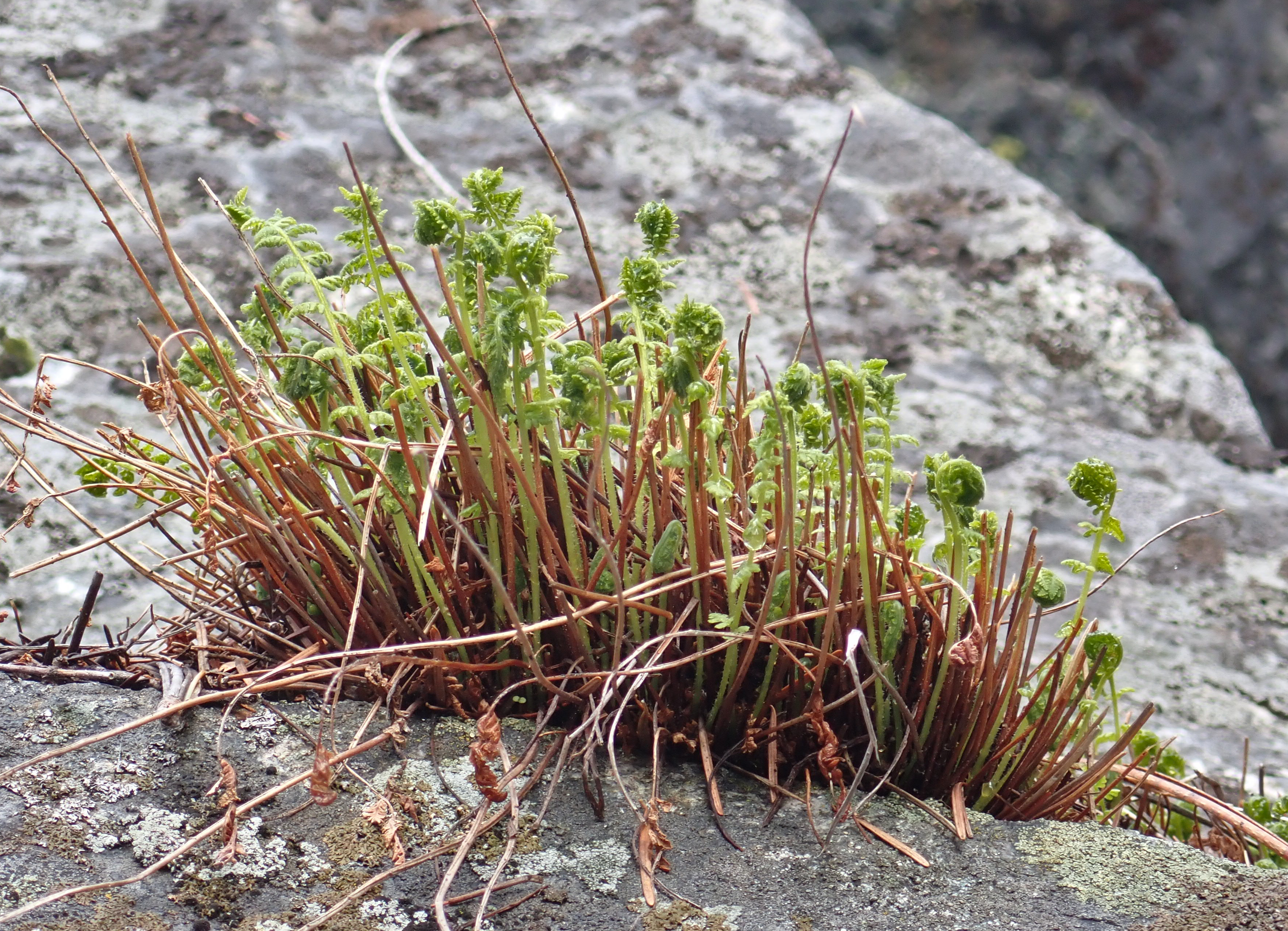
Leafing out in spring

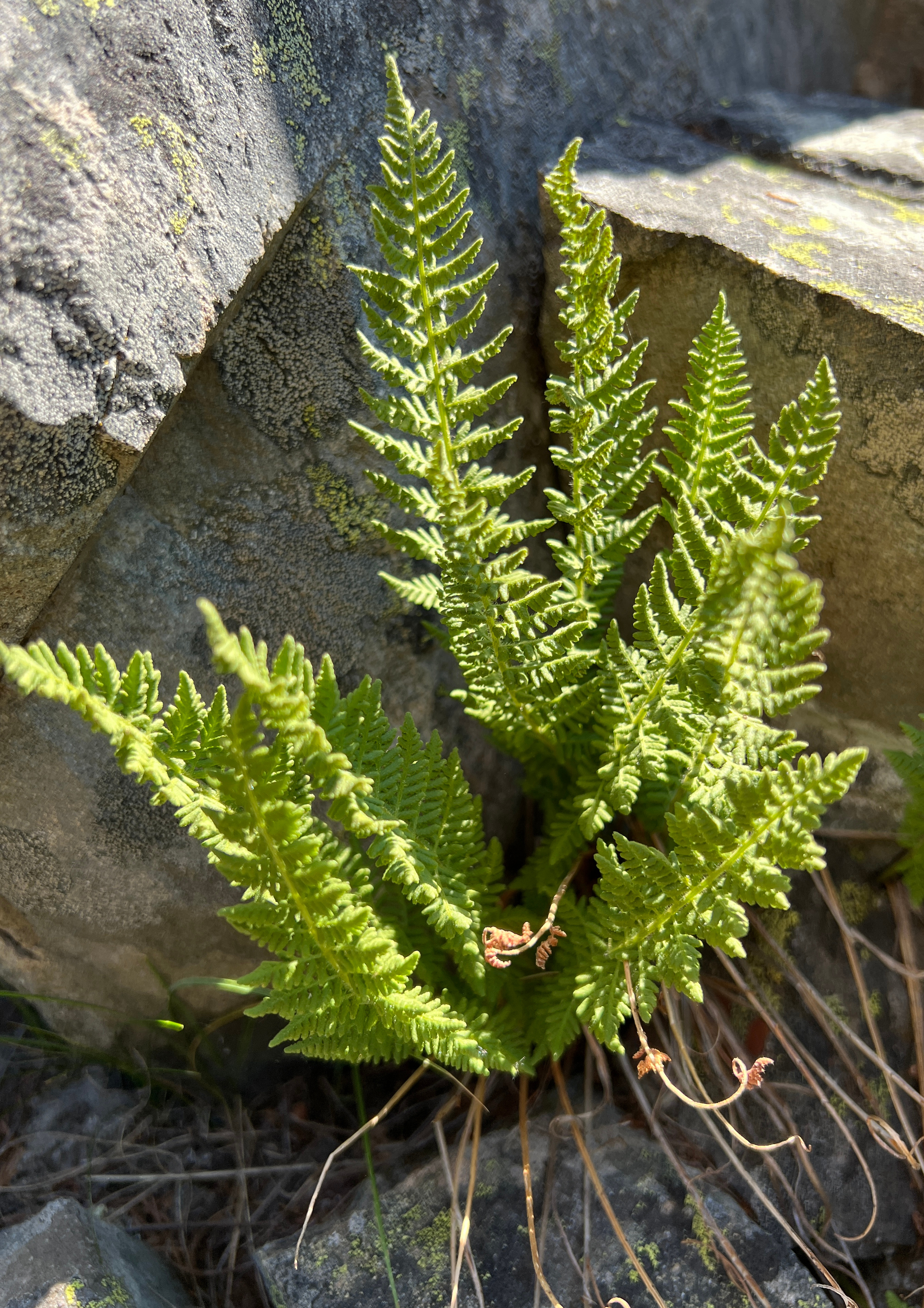
Growing among talus rock

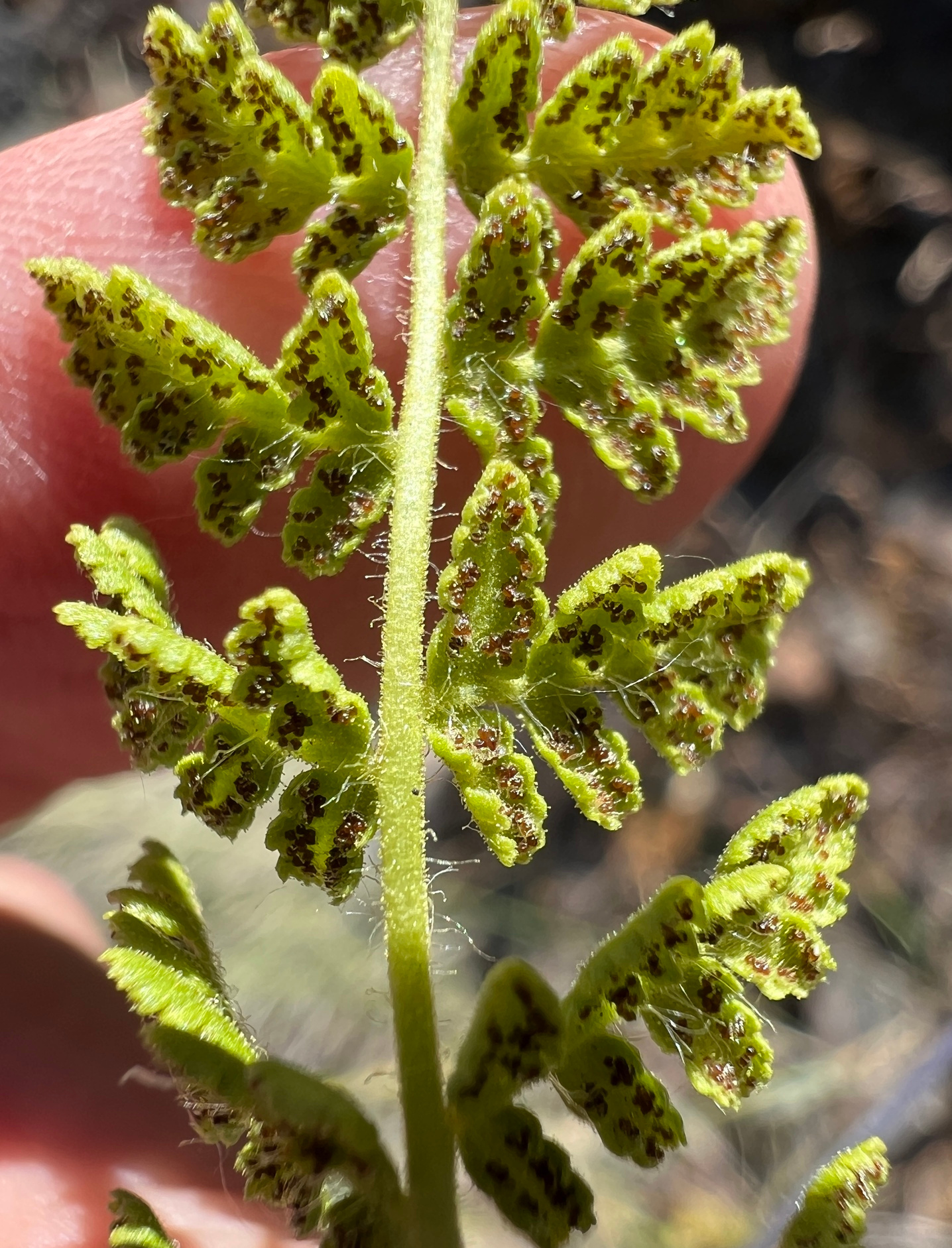
Underside of leaf
