= Philodendron spruceanum =

Scientific classification
- Kingdom: Plantae
- Clade: Tracheophytes
- Clade: Angiosperms
- Clade: Monocots
- Order: Alismatales
- Family: Araceae
- Genus: Philodendron
- Species: P. spruceanum

Binomial name
- Philodendron spruceanum G.S.Bunting

Species of plant

Philodendron spruceanum is a species of flowering plant in the family Araceae, native to southern Venezuela. It was first described by George Sydney Bunting in 1975.
