= Joseph Woods (architect) =

English architect, botanist and geologist (1776–1864)

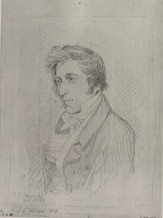
Joseph Woods, 1819 drawing

Joseph Woods FLS, FGS (24 August 1776 – 9 January 1864) was an English Quaker architect, botanist and geologist born in the village of Stoke Newington, a few miles north of the City of London. A Member of the Society of Antiquaries, and an Honorary Member of the Society of British Architects, he was also elected a Fellow of the Linnean Society and a Fellow of the Geological Society in recognition of his original research.

== Family background ==
His mother was Margaret Hoare, daughter of Samuel Hoare (1716-1796), a London merchant from an Irish background, and Grizell Gurnell (1722? - 1802), of Ealing. The Hoares lived on what is now Stoke Newington Church Street, opposite Clissold Park.

His father, Joseph Woods the elder, was an abolitionist. He and Joseph's uncle Samuel Hoare Jr were two of the four Quaker founders of the London Abolition Committee, the predecessor body to the Committee for the Abolition of the Slave Trade.

== Education ==
Joseph Woods' early education was at home, where his parents taught him Latin, Greek, Modern Greek, Hebrew, Italian and French. Later (at about age 16) he studied architecture under Daniel Asher Alexander.

== Architect ==
Woods was responsible around 1790 for the design and building of Clissold House in Stoke Newington, for his uncle Jonathan Hoare. In 1806 he founded the London Architectural Society and became its first President. In 1816, immediately after the end of the Napoleonic Wars, he was able to travel throughout the Continent and visited France, Switzerland, and Italy, studying their architecture and botany. Drawing on part of this experience, his book Letters of an Architect was published in 1828.

== Botany ==
After about 1835 Joseph Wood's interest in architecture gave way to his other passion, botany. Many years earlier, he had completed a study of the genus Rosa, which had been published in the Transactions of the Linnean Society in 1818 under the title Synopsis of the British Species of Rosa and established Woods' reputation as a systematic botanist. leaving architecture to one side, he was now able to devote himself more fully to botany and his botanical notes, made during his Continental and British travels, were published in the Companion to the Botanical Magazine in 1835 and in 1836, and in successive volumes of The Phytologist beginning in 1843.

In 1850 he published The Tourist's Flora: a descriptive catalogue of the flowering plants and ferns of the British Islands, France, Germany, Switzerland, Italy, and the Italian islands, drawing further on his many field excursions in Europe and the British Isles.

A genus of fern, Woodsia, is named in his honour.

== Extended family ==
Joseph Woods's uncles and aunts, on his mother's side, included:

- Samuel Hoare Jr (1751-1825), banker and abolitionist;
- Jonathan Hoare (1752-1819), merchant of Throgmorton Street, partner in Gurnell, Hoare & Co., who built Clissold House and then ran into financial difficulties; and
- Grizell Hoare (1757-1835), who as a wealthy 72-year-old widow of Wilson Birkbeck married William Allen, pharmacist, philanthropist and abolitionist, with whom she founded Newington Academy for Girls in 1824.
