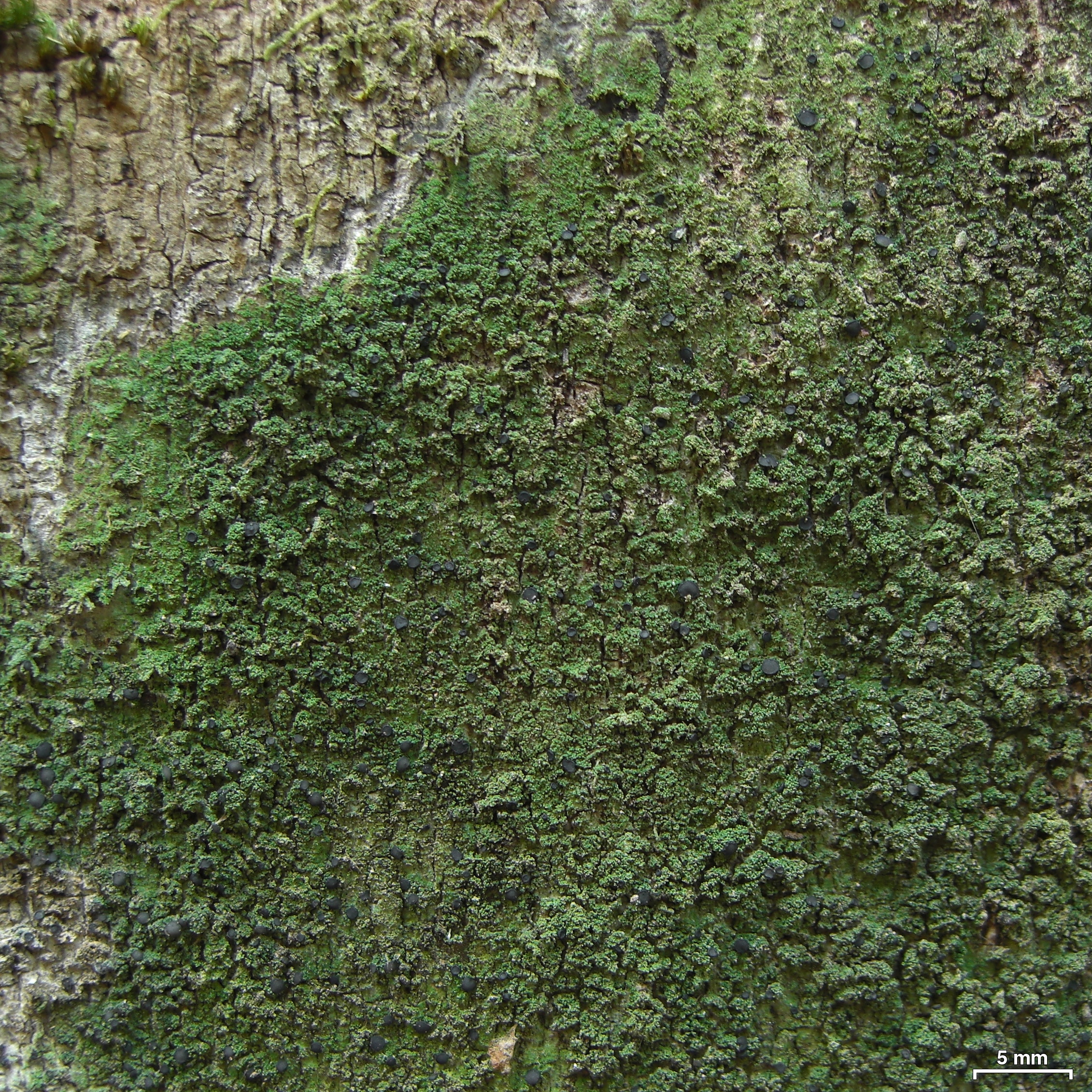
- Malmidea furfurosa

Scientific classification
- Kingdom: Fungi
- Division: Ascomycota
- Class: Lecanoromycetes
- Order: Lecanorales
- Family: Malmideaceae; Kalb, Rivas Plata & Lumbsch (2011)

Type genus
- Malmidea Kalb, Rivas Plata & Lumbsch (2011)

Genera
- Australidea; Cheiromycina; Crustospathula; Kalbionora; Malmidea; Multisporidea; Savoronala; Sprucidea; Zhurbenkoa

= Malmideaceae =

Family of fungi

Malmideaceae is a family of crustose and corticolous lichens in the order Lecanorales. It contains eight genera and about 70 species.

== Taxonomy ==
Malmideaceae was created in 2011 to accommodate a group of species, formerly placed in genus Malcolmiella (family Ectolechiaceae), that molecular phylogenetics showed to be a distinct lineage and worthy of recognition at the family level. The genus Savoronala, containing the single African species S. madagascariensis, was added to the family in 2013, while another monotypic genus Kalbionora was added in 2017.

== Description ==
Malmideaceae is similar to Ectolechiaceae, but can be distinguished from that family by thallus organization and ascus structure. Malmidea species have a thallus made of goniocysts–spherical aggregations of photobiont cells surrounded by short-celled hyphae. This characteristic is quite rare in the Ectolechiaceae, only found in the monotypic genera Calopadiopsis and Pseudocalopadia. Despite the general overall similarity of the ascus structure between the two families, unlike the Ectolechiaceae, Malmideaceae species lack a tubular structure in their asci. Most Malmidea species are restricted to subtropical areas.

The genus Zhurbenkoa, consisting of three lichenicolous fungi from South America and Europe, represented the addition of a new nutritional mode for the Malmideaceae, which until then had consisted of only lichen-forming associations between fungi and green algae.

== Genera ==
- Australidea Kantvilas, Wedin & M.Svenss. (2021) – 1 sp.
- Cheiromycina B.Sutton (1986) – 4 spp.
- Crustospathula Aptroot (1998) – 4 spp.
- Kalbionora Sodamuk, S.D.Leav. & Lumbsch (2017) – 1 sp.
- Malmidea Kalb, Rivas Plata & Lumbsch (2011) – 52 spp.
- Multisporidea Kalb & Aptroot (2021) – 1 sp.
- Savoronala Ertz, Eb. Fisch., Killmann, Razafindr. & Sérus (2013) – 1 sp.
- Sprucidea M.Cáceres, Aptroot & Lücking (2017) – 4 spp.
- Zhurbenkoa Flakus, Etayo, Pérez-Ortega & Rodr. Flakus (2019) – 3 spp.

Crustospathula was transferred to the Malmideaceae from the Ramalinaceae in 2018.
