= Sporodochium =

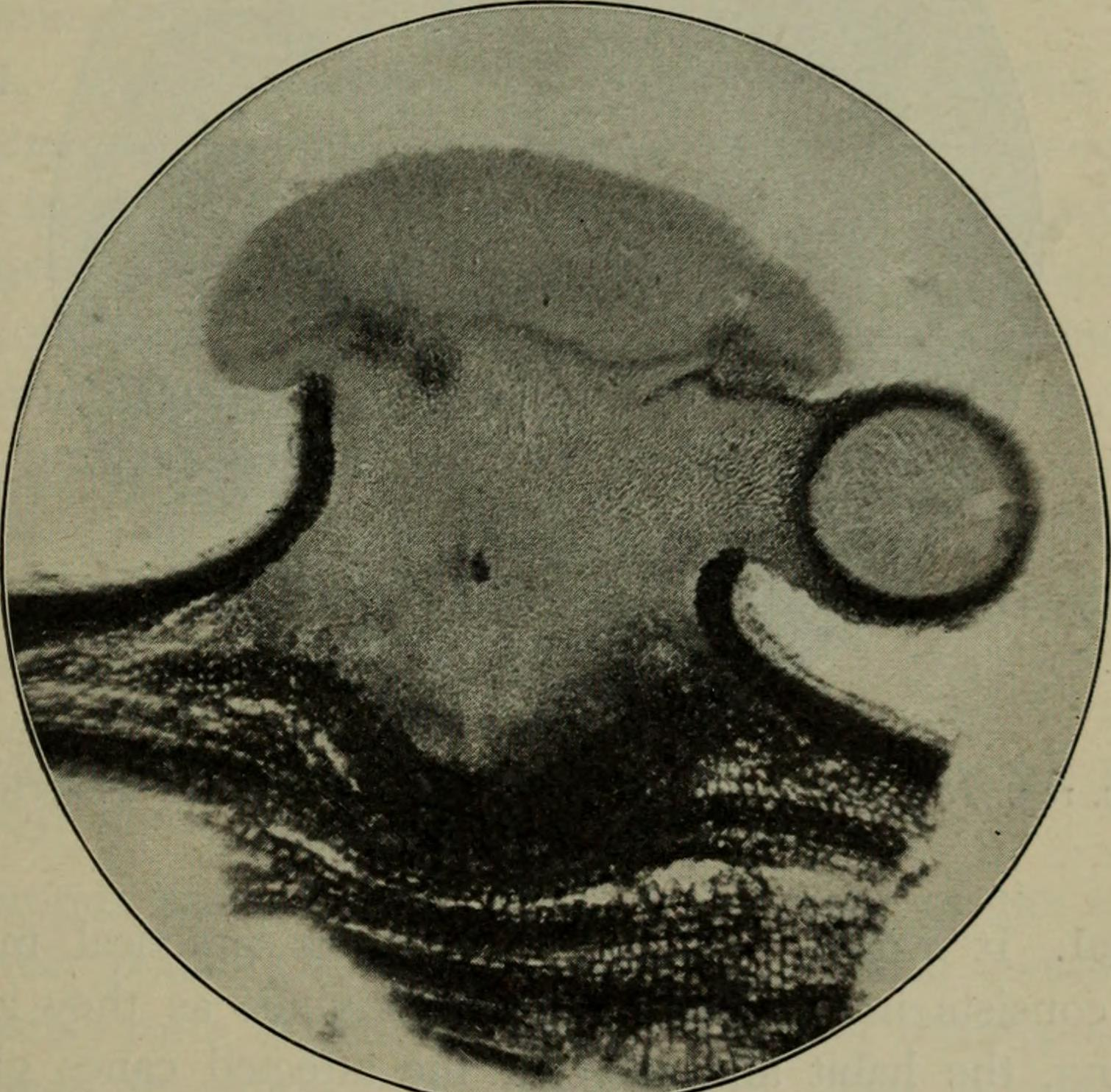
Nectria cinnabarina, section of sporodochium, with young perithecium

A sporodochium (pl. sporodochia) is a small, compact stroma (mass of hyphae) usually formed on host plants parasitised by mitosporic fungi of the form order Tuberculariales (subdivision Deuteromycota, class Hyphomycetes). This stroma bears the conidiophores on which the asexual spores or conidia are formed.

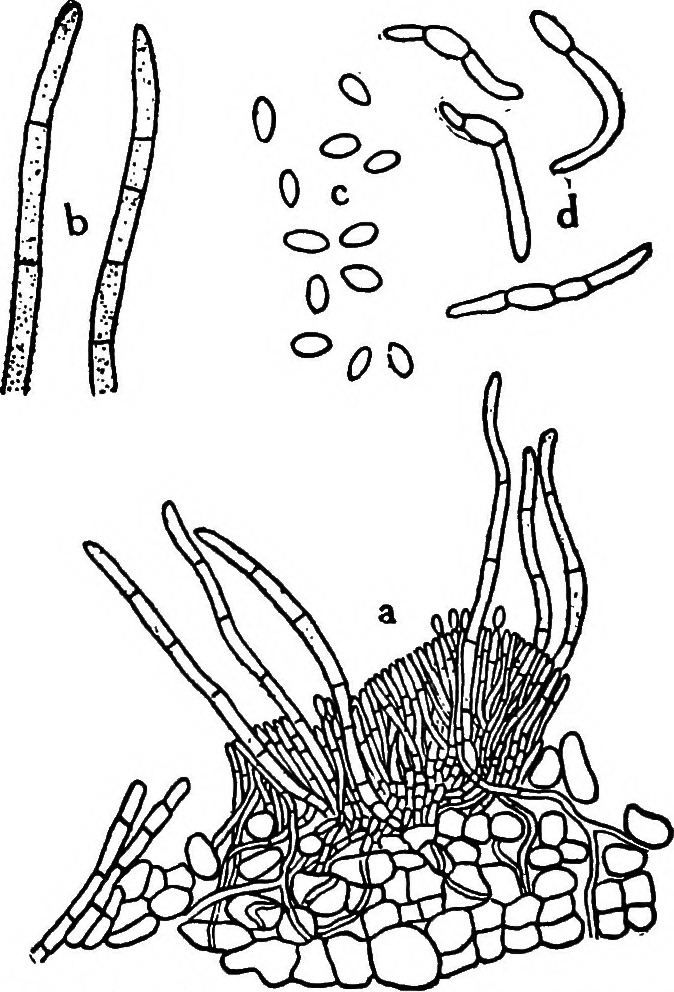
Tubercularia fici a: sporodochium, b, c, d: showing setae and conidial formation
