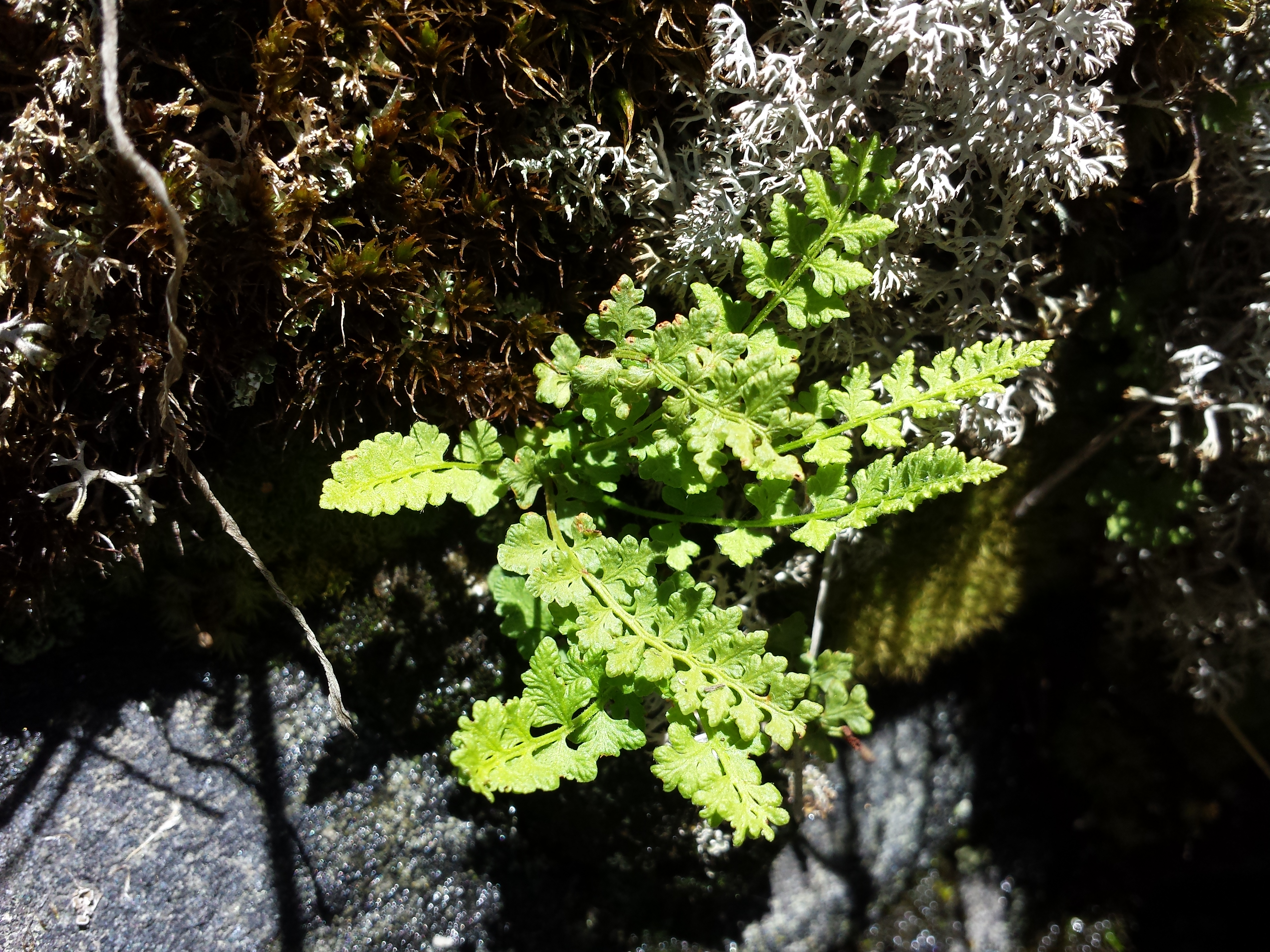
- Woodsia alpina
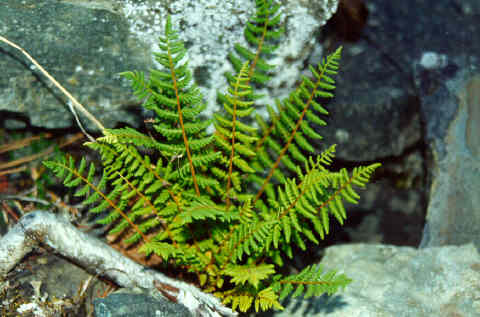
- Physematium oreganum

Scientific classification
- Kingdom: Plantae
- Clade: Tracheophytes
- Division: Polypodiophyta
- Class: Polypodiopsida
- Order: Polypodiales
- Suborder: Aspleniineae
- Family: Woodsiaceae; Herter

Genera
- Physematium; Woodsia; × Woodsimatium

Synonyms
- Physematieae Smith 1875; Protowoodsioideae Shmakov 2001; Woodsiinae Hooker 1844; Woodsieae Gray 1856; Woodsioideae Fomin 1911

= Woodsiaceae =

Family of ferns

Woodsiaceae is a family of ferns. In the Pteridophyte Phylogeny Group classification of 2016 (PPG I), it is placed in the suborder Aspleniineae. The family can also be treated as the subfamily Woodsioideae of a very broadly defined family Aspleniaceae sensu lato. In PPG I, the family contained only one genus, Woodsia. In 2020, Physematium was split off from Woodsia on the basis of molecular phylogenetic evidence. As of June 2023, Plants of the World Online continued to treat Physematium as a synonym of Woodsia.

== Taxonomy ==
Woodsiaceae formerly included the members of the families Athyriaceae and Diplaziopsidaceae, but analysis has consistently shown that they should be treated as separate families. The following cladogram for the suborder Aspleniineae (as eupolypods II), based on Lehtonen (2011), and Rothfels et al. (2012), shows a likely phylogenetic relationship between the Woodsiaceae and the other families of the Aspleniineae.

- Aspleniineae (eupolypods II)
  - Cystopteridaceae
  - - - Rhachidosoraceae
      - - Diplaziopsidaceae
        - - Aspleniaceae
          - Hemidictyaceae
    - - Thelypteridaceae
      - - Woodsiaceae
        - - - Onocleaceae
            - Blechnaceae
          - Athyriaceae

A molecular phylogenetic study published in 2020 largely confirmed the position of the family. It included 122 accessions representing about 43 species then placed in the sole genus Woodsia. It showed that Woodsia was deeply divided into two clades, which the authors recognized as two genera Physematium and Woodsia.

=== Genera ===
As of June 2023, World Ferns accepted three genera:

- Physematium Kaulf.
- Woodsia R.Br.
- ×Woodsimatium Li Bing Zhang, N.T.Lu & X.F.Gao = Woodsia × Physematium

== Distribution ==
Species of Woodsia are native to northern North America and Eurasia, and further south in the east of Asia, from western mainland China to Taiwan. Although the distributions overlap, species of Physematium generally have a more southern distribution, being found further south in North America and in northern South America as well as in Asia, with a few species in Africa and Madagascar.
