= Anomalographis =

Scientific classification
- Domain: Eukaryota
- Kingdom: Fungi
- Division: Ascomycota
- Class: Lecanoromycetes
- Order: Graphidales
- Family: Graphidaceae
- Genus: Anomalographis; Kalb (1992)

Type species
- Anomalographis madeirensis (Tav.) Kalb (1992)

Species
- A. madeirensis A. tulliensis

Genus of lichen-forming fungi

Anomalographis is a genus of two species of lichen-forming fungi in the family Graphidaceae. These lichens form pale grey to yellow-brown crusts and are characterized by elongated, slit-like fruiting bodies containing very small spores divided by a single internal wall. One species grows on shaded volcanic rock faces in Madeira, while the other was discovered growing on tree bases in northeastern Queensland rainforest, showing the genus can colonize both rock and bark surfaces in humid, shaded environments.

== Taxonomy ==
Anomalographis was circumscribed by the German lichenologist Klaus Kalb in 1992. He assigned A. madeirensis as the type, and at the time, only species in the genus. An additional species newly described from Australia was added to Anomalographis in 2013.

== Description ==
Anomalographis comprises two species that share a pale grey- to yellow-brown crust (thallus) lacking a cortex and bearing lirelliform fruiting bodies with a pale, non-carbonised excipulum. The hymenium is clear and non-inspersed, and the Graphis-type asci contain eight hyaline, I–, 1-septate ascospores. A. madeirensis has a smooth, crystal-dusted surface, contains norstictic acid, and produces spores 8–11 μm long, whereas the newly described A. tulliensis forms a finely sorediate bark-dwelling crust, lacks detectable lichen products, and has slightly smaller spores (6–8 × 3–4 μm).

Superficially similar genera such as Acanthothecis, Anomomorpha, Carbacanthographis, Fissurina and Gymnographopsis differ by some combination of inspersion, muriform or iodine-positive spores, or fully carbonised exciples; the coexistence of a clear hymenium, pale excipulum and very small, thin-walled, I–, 1-septate spores is diagnostic for Anomalographis.

== Ecology ==
Anomalographis madeirensis is saxicolous, occupying shaded volcanic rock faces on Madeira, whereas A. tulliensis grows on the bases of trees in submontane rainforest at about 620 m in north-eastern Queensland; the latter record extends the genus to Australia and confirms its ability to colonise both bark and rock in humid, shaded habitats.
