= Carbacanthographis latispora =

Scientific classification
- Domain: Eukaryota
- Kingdom: Fungi
- Division: Ascomycota
- Class: Lecanoromycetes
- Order: Graphidales
- Family: Graphidaceae
- Genus: Carbacanthographis
- Species: C. latispora

Binomial name
- Carbacanthographis latispora Feuerstein & Lücking (2022)

Species of lichen

Carbacanthographis latispora is a species of corticolous (bark-dwelling) lichen in the family Graphidaceae. Found in Venezuela, it was formally described as a new species in 2022 by Shirley Cunha Feuerstein and Robert Lücking. The type specimen was collected near the savannah of La Esmeralda (Alto Orinoco Municipality Amazonas); here, in the Amazon rainforest, the lichen was found growing on a dead branch. It is only known to occur at the type locality. It has a whitish-grey thallus that lacks both a cortex and a prothallus. Its ascospores typically measure 140–155 by 30–35 μm and have from 13 to 17 transverse septa. The specific epithet refers to its unusually broad ascospores. Stictic acid, cryptostictic acid, and constictic acid are lichen products that occur in this species.
