= Carbacanthographis brasiliensis =

Scientific classification
- Domain: Eukaryota
- Kingdom: Fungi
- Division: Ascomycota
- Class: Lecanoromycetes
- Order: Graphidales
- Family: Graphidaceae
- Genus: Carbacanthographis
- Species: C. brasiliensis

Binomial name
- Carbacanthographis brasiliensis Feuerstein & Lücking (2022)

Species of lichen

Carbacanthographis brasiliensis is a species of corticolous (bark-dwelling) lichen in the family Graphidaceae. Found in São Paulo, Brazil, it was formally described as a new species in 2022 by Shirley Cunha Feuerstein and Robert Lücking. The type specimen was collected from Mirante de São José dos Alpes (Serra da Mantiqueira, Campos do Jordão) at an altitude of 1,750 m (5,740 ft); here, in a cloud forest, the lichen was found growing on a tree. It has a whitish grey thallus without a cortex and also without a prothallus. It is similar to Carbacanthographis aptrootii, but unlike that species, it does not contain any lichen products. The specific epithet brasiliensis refers to the country from which it was first documented.
