= Astrothelium komposchii =

Scientific classification
- Kingdom: Fungi
- Division: Ascomycota
- Class: Dothideomycetes
- Order: Trypetheliales
- Family: Trypetheliaceae
- Genus: Astrothelium
- Species: A. komposchii

Binomial name
- Astrothelium komposchii Aptroot (2016)

Species of lichen

Astrothelium komposchii is a species of corticolous (bark-dwelling) lichen in the family Trypetheliaceae. Found in Venezuela, it was formally described as a new species in 2016 by Dutch lichenologist André Aptroot. The type specimen was collected by Josef Hafellner and Harald Komposch about 15 km (15,000 m) southwest of La Esmeralda (Alto Orinoco Municipality) at an altitude of 110 m (360 ft); there, on the west bank of the Surumoni river, it was found growing on the bark of Goupia glabra. The species epithet honours Komposch. The lichen has a green, discontinuous thallus comprising rows of small, flattened lobes (almost squamulose in appearance) with a hyaline (translucent) cortex. The presence of the lichen does not induce the formation of galls in the host plant. No lichen products were detected in the collected specimens using thin-layer chromatography. The main characteristics of the lichen distinguishing it from others in Astrothelium are the uncoloured hamathecium, and the dimensions of its ascospores (35–45 μm broad).
