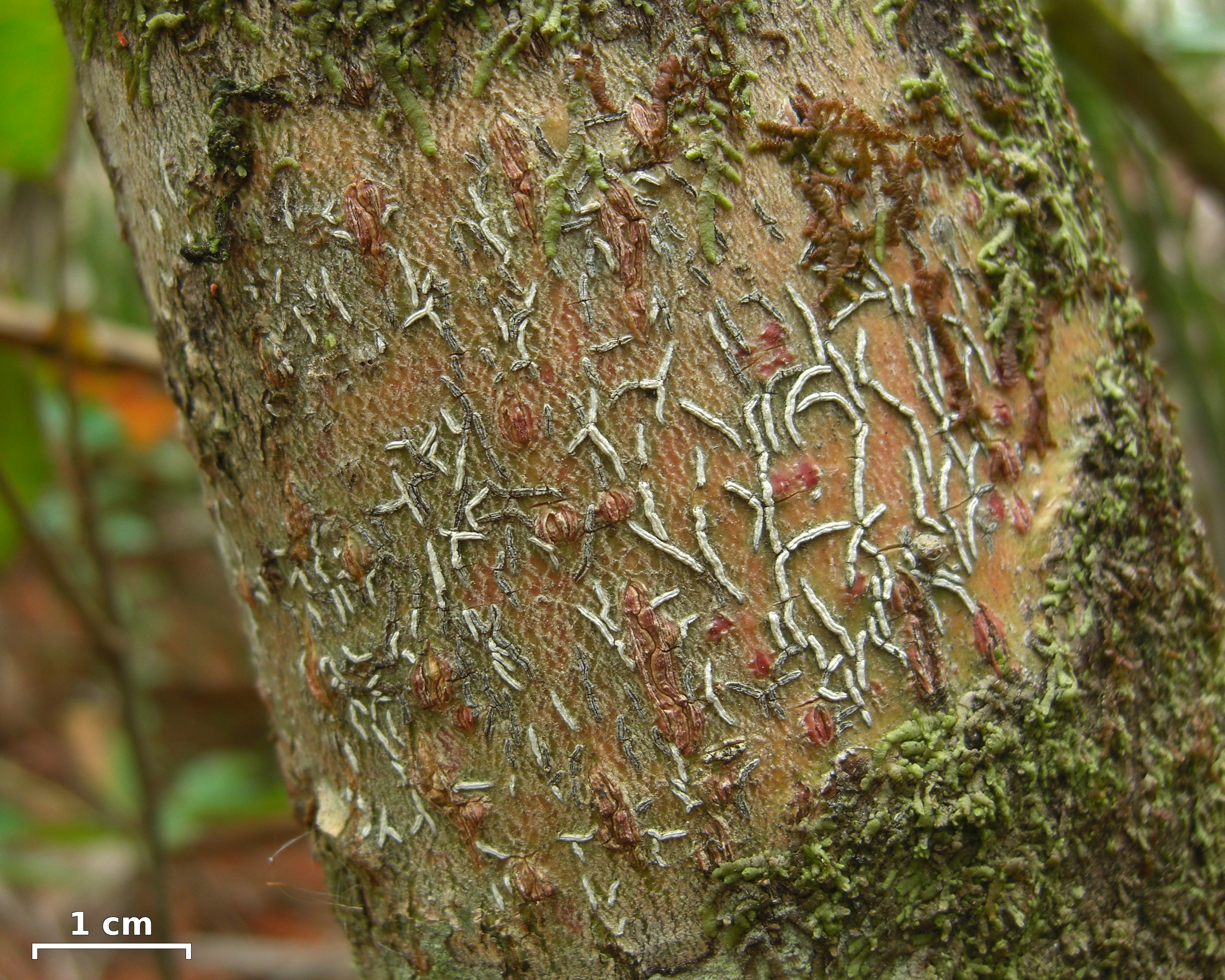
- Dyplolabia afzelii

Scientific classification
- Domain: Eukaryota
- Kingdom: Fungi
- Division: Ascomycota
- Class: Lecanoromycetes
- Order: Graphidales
- Family: Graphidaceae
- Genus: Dyplolabia; A.Massal. (1854)

Type species
- Dyplolabia afzelii (Ach.) A.Massal. (1854)

Species
- D. afzelii D. chumphonensis D. dalywaiana D. ochrocheila D. oryzoides

= Dyplolabia =

Genus of lichen-forming fungi

Dyplolabia is a genus of lichen-forming fungi in the family Graphidaceae. These lichens form smooth, rather thick grey-yellow to olive-buff crusts on tree bark and are characterized by narrow, elongate fruiting bodies that are commonly hidden beneath a conspicuous white powdery coating. The genus has a pantropical distribution, growing on the smooth bark of trees and shrubs in both shaded rainforest understories and moderately exposed coastal woodlands, where they serve as indicators of long-established woodland habitat.

== Taxonomy ==
The genus was circumscribed by the Italian lichenologist Abramo Bartolommeo Massalongo in 1854, with Dyplolabia afzelii assigned as the type species.

== Description ==
Dyplolabia produces a smooth, rather thick grey-yellow to olive-buff crust (thallus) that lacks a protective cortex. Its fruit bodies are narrow, elongate lirellae 1–6 mm long, commonly hidden beneath a conspicuous white pruina. The sides of each lirella are deeply carbonised, while the top is covered by an intact thalline layer so the slit-like disc is scarcely visible. A pale to brown excipulum lines the base, and the clear hymenium bears simple paraphyses and a green-brown epithecium. The slender asci usually contain eight hyaline ascospores that are consistently 3-septate, non-amyloid (I–) and measure about 14–20 × 6–8 μm. Most species contain only traces of lecanoric acid or are chemically inert, a feature that helps separate the genus from many chemically richer Graphidaceae.

The combination of thick white pruina, strongly carbonised lirellae and small, 3-septate, iodine-negative spores distinguishes Dyplolabia from superficially similar script lichen genera. In Graphis and Glyphis the discs are exposed and the spores usually have more septa; Fissurina shares carbonised margins but lacks the heavy thalline cover; while Acanthothecis and Anomomorpha have longer or iodine-positive spores and an inspersed hymenium.

== Ecology ==
Species of Dyplolabia are pantropical and strictly corticolous, occurring on the smooth bark of trees and shrubs in both shaded rainforest understorys and moderately exposed coastal woodlands. Their broad distribution—from wet Amazonian terra firma through African and Asian lowland forests to seasonally dry savannas and the subtropical Atlantic Coastal Plain of North America—suggests tolerance of a wide humidity range, yet they remain absent from heavily disturbed stands, making them useful indicators of long-established woodland habitat.

== Species ==
As of June 2025, Species Fungorum (in the Catalogue of Life) accept five species of Dyplolabia:

- Dyplolabia afzelii (Ach.) A.Massal. (1854)
- Dyplolabia chumphonensis J.Kalb & Kalb (2016)
- Dyplolabia dalywaiana Rivas Plata, Bawingan & Lücking (2016)
- Dyplolabia ochrocheila (Vain.) Rivas Plata & Lücking (2016)
- Dyplolabia oryzoides (Leight.) Kalb & Staiger 2000)
