= Carbacanthographis multiseptata =

Scientific classification
- Domain: Eukaryota
- Kingdom: Fungi
- Division: Ascomycota
- Class: Lecanoromycetes
- Order: Graphidales
- Family: Graphidaceae
- Genus: Carbacanthographis
- Species: C. multiseptata

Binomial name
- Carbacanthographis multiseptata Feuerstein & Lücking (2022)

Species of lichen

Carbacanthographis multiseptata is a species of corticolous (bark-dwelling) lichen in the family Graphidaceae. Found in Venezuela, it was formally described as a new species in 2022 by Shirley Cunha Feuerstein and Robert Lücking. The type specimen was collected in the Amazon rainforest near the Surumomi River (Alto Orinoco, Amazonas) at an altitude of 120 m (390 ft). It is only known to occur at the type locality.

The lichen has a whitish to pale beige thallus lacking both a cortex and a prothallus. It has hyaline ascospores that measure 170–200 by 12–16 μm; these spores have between 29 and 35 transverse septa. The specific epithet multiseptata refers to this characteristic feature. Carbacanthographis multiseptata contains protocetraric acid, a lichen product that can be detected using thin-layer chromatography.
