= Carbacanthographis pseudorustica =

Scientific classification
- Domain: Eukaryota
- Kingdom: Fungi
- Division: Ascomycota
- Class: Lecanoromycetes
- Order: Graphidales
- Family: Graphidaceae
- Genus: Carbacanthographis
- Species: C. pseudorustica

Binomial name
- Carbacanthographis pseudorustica Feuerstein & Lücking (2022)

Species of lichen

Carbacanthographis pseudorustica is a species of corticolous (bark-dwelling) lichen in the family Graphidaceae. Found in insular Malaysia, it was formally described as a new species in 2022 by Shirley Cunha Feuerstein and Robert Lücking. The type specimen was collected in 1965 by American lichenologist Mason Hale from a virgin peat dipterocarp forest in the Sungai Assan logging area (Sarawak). It is similar to Carbacanthographis halei, but has larger ascospores. The specific epithet pseudorustica recalls Allographa rustica, the name of a lookalike species that Hale had originally applied to his collections of this lichen.

The lichen has a whitish to pale beige thallus lacking both a cortex and a prothallus. It has hyaline ascospores that measure 45–65 by 10–12 μm; these spores have between 11 and 15 transverse septa. Carbacanthographis pseudorustica contains stictic acid and constictic acid, which are lichen products that can be detected using thin-layer chromatography.
