= Carbacanthographis salazinicoides =

Scientific classification
- Domain: Eukaryota
- Kingdom: Fungi
- Division: Ascomycota
- Class: Lecanoromycetes
- Order: Graphidales
- Family: Graphidaceae
- Genus: Carbacanthographis
- Species: C. salazinicoides

Binomial name
- Carbacanthographis salazinicoides Feuerstein & Lücking (2022)

Species of lichen

Carbacanthographis salazinicoides is a species of corticolous (bark-dwelling) lichen in the family Graphidaceae. Found in Papua New Guinea, it was formally described as a new species in 2022 by Shirley Cunha Feuerstein and Robert Lücking. The type specimen was collected by André Aptroot from a primary montane forest in Myola (Owen Stanley Range, Central Province), at an elevation of 2,100 m (6,900 ft). It is only known to occur at the type locality. The specific epithet salazinicoides refers to its resemblance with Carbacanthographis salazinica, from which it differs by having larger ascospores.

The lichen has a pale beige to whitish thallus with a thin cortex and a dark brown prothallus. It has hyaline ascospores that measure 40–60 by 8 μm; these spores are muriform, meaning they are divided into chambers with longitudinal and transverse septa. Carbacanthographis salazinicoides contains salazinic acid, a lichen product that can be detected using thin-layer chromatography.
