= Gymnographopsis =

Scientific classification
- Domain: Eukaryota
- Kingdom: Fungi
- Division: Ascomycota
- Class: Lecanoromycetes
- Order: Graphidales
- Family: Redonographaceae
- Genus: Gymnographopsis; C.W.Dodge (1967)

Type species
- Gymnographopsis chilena C.W.Dodge (1967)

Species
- G. cerei G. chilena G. corticicola G. follmannii G. koreaiensis G. latispora

Genus of lichens

Gymnographopsis is a genus of lichen-forming fungi in the family Graphidaceae. It was circumscribed by American lichenologist Carroll William Dodge in 1967, with Gymnographopsis chilena assigned as the type species. These lichens form dull grey-olive to yellow-brown crusts on tree bark and are characterized by straight to weakly curved fruiting bodies whose sides appear brown-black and whose openings expose disc-like surfaces. The genus has a pantropical distribution, growing on shaded tree trunks and lower branches in evergreen forests, where their intolerance of heavy disturbance makes them useful indicators of long-standing, moist woodland habitats.

== Description ==
Gymnographopsis forms a dull grey-olive to yellow-brown crust (thallus) that lacks a true cortex and is often dusted with minute beige crystals. The ascomata are straight to weakly curved lirellae (0.2–1.5 mm long) whose lips soon open to expose the disc; their flanks may appear brown-black but are only partly carbonised. A light brown excipulum overhangs the clear hymenium, which is free of inspersion and lined with short, smooth periphysoids. The Graphis-type asci usually contain eight hyaline ascospores that become conspicuously muriform—divided by numerous transverse and a few longitudinal septa—yet remain iodine-negative (I–); spore sizes in most species fall between 20 × 7 μm and 40 × 12 μm, though extremes occur. Chemistry is modest: norstictic acid is frequent, with stictic-series depsidones or no detectable metabolites in other taxa.

The genus is set apart from superficially similar script lichens by the coexistence of partly carbonised lirellae, smooth periphysoids, an inspersion-free hymenium and small, I– muriform spores. In Carbacanthographis the excipulum is completely carbonised; Acanthothecis and Anomomorpha have spiny (spinulose) or iodine-positive elements; and Gyphis has significantly larger spores. A diagnostic additional feature in several species, such as G. corticicola, is a rectangular perispore that folds at the poles when mounted in potassium hydroxide.

== Ecology ==
Gymnographopsis is pantropical, ranging from the lowland Amazon basin and West-Central African rainforests to Indochina, New Guinea and north-eastern Australia. All known species are corticolous, occupying shaded trunks and lower branches in evergreen forests; their intolerance of heavy disturbance makes them handy indicators of long-standing, moist woodland.

Work in Mexico's seasonally dry forests uncovered the corticolous G. corticicola, the first Northern-Hemisphere record for the genus and its smallest-spored member (about 12 × 5 μm). Molecular data place the taxon within subfamily Redonographoideae and suggest further undiscovered diversity across Mesoamerica.

== Species ==
- Gymnographopsis cerei Follmann (1968)
- Gymnographopsis chilena C.W.Dodge (1967)
- Gymnographopsis corticicola R.Miranda, Herrera-Camp. & Lücking (2020)
- Gymnographopsis follmannii C.W.Dodge (1967)
- Gymnographopsis koreaiensis (Sipman) Lücking & Sipman (2021)
- Gymnographopsis latispora Egea & Torrente (1996)
