= Anomomorpha lecanorina =

Scientific classification
- Domain: Eukaryota
- Kingdom: Fungi
- Division: Ascomycota
- Class: Lecanoromycetes
- Order: Graphidales
- Family: Graphidaceae
- Genus: Anomomorpha
- Species: A. lecanorina

Binomial name
- Anomomorpha lecanorina Sipman (2011)

Species of fungus

Anomomorpha lecanorina is a rare species of script lichen in the family Graphidaceae. Found in southern Ecuador, where it grows in montane forests at altitudes of 2,000–2,500 metres (6,600–8,200 ft), it was described as new to science in 2011. The specific epithet lecanorina denotes the resemblance of its fruit bodies to those of the genus Lecanora.

== Taxonomy ==
Anomomorpha lecanorina was first scientifically described by Dutch lichenologist Harrie Sipman as a new species in 2011. The epithet lecanorina was chosen to reflect the resemblance of the ascocarps to the genus Lecanora, which is an unusual occurrence for the family Graphidaceae. The type specimen was found in the Estación Científica San Francisco nature reserve in Zamora-Chinchipe Province, Ecuador.

== Description ==
Anomomorpha lecanorina forms large, pale grey crustose patches, with a smooth upper surface that is delimited by a dark brown prothallus line. The ascomata are rounded, 1–3 mm wide, and have a distinct thalloid margin. The ascospores are hyaline, somewhat muriform, with 4 by 1–2 locules, and measure 10–15 by 7 μm. A key distinguishing feature is the iodine (I)-negative hymenium and I+ dark-violet, muriform spores, which are indicative of the Graphidaceae.

The lichen's secondary chemistry is also unusual, as it produces constictic acid, whereas most other Anomomorpha species have norstictic acid. No pycnidia have been observed in this species.

== Habitat and distribution ==
Anomomorpha lecanorina was originally described from three specimens collected from the Reserva Biológica San Francisco in the province of Zamora-Chinchipe, southern Ecuador. It is found in montane primary forests at elevations of 2,000–2,500 m (6,600–8,200 ft). Two of the specimens were collected in the canopy of Elaeagia obovata trees, which have a relatively acidic bark. The region where Anomomorpha lecanorina is found appears to be particularly rich in locally endemic lichens. For example, three endemic Hypotrachyna species have been reported from the same area. A. lecanorina was later reported from the Ecuadorian Andes.
