= Carbacanthographis aggregata =

Scientific classification
- Domain: Eukaryota
- Kingdom: Fungi
- Division: Ascomycota
- Class: Lecanoromycetes
- Order: Graphidales
- Family: Graphidaceae
- Genus: Carbacanthographis
- Species: C. aggregata

Binomial name
- Carbacanthographis aggregata Feuerstein & Lücking (2022)

Species of lichen

Carbacanthographis aggregata is a species of corticolous (bark-dwelling) lichen in the family Graphidaceae. Found in Asia, it was formally described as a new species in 2022 by Shirley Cunha Feuerstein and Robert Lücking. The type specimen was collected from the Gunung Pulai Forest Reserve in Johor (Malaysia) at an altitude of 150 m (490 ft). It has also been recorded from the Tai Po Kau Nature Reserve in China. The lichen has a greenish grey to grey thallus that lacks a cortex, but has a black prothallus. Its ascomata (ascospore-bearing structures) are aggregated in small clusters; it is this characteristic that is referred to in the specific epithet aggregata. The lichen contains salazinic acid and trace amounts of norstictic acid; these are lichen products that can be detected using thin-layer chromatography.
