= Carbacanthographis subchionophora =

Scientific classification
- Domain: Eukaryota
- Kingdom: Fungi
- Division: Ascomycota
- Class: Lecanoromycetes
- Order: Graphidales
- Family: Graphidaceae
- Genus: Carbacanthographis
- Species: C. subchionophora

Binomial name
- Carbacanthographis subchionophora Feuerstein & Lücking (2022)

Species of lichen

Carbacanthographis subchionophora is a species of corticolous (bark-dwelling) lichen in the family Graphidaceae. Found in Papua New Guinea and Brazil, it was formally described as a new species in 2022 by Shirley Cunha Feuerstein and Robert Lücking. The type specimen was collected from Kagi Village (Owen Stanley Range, Central Province). It is similar to Carbacanthographis chionophora, but unlike that lichen, it does not contain lichexanthone. The specific epithet subchionophora refers to its resemblance with this species.

The lichen has a greyish white to yellowish grey thallus with a thin cortex and a black prothallus. It has hyaline ascospores that measure 22–25 by 5 μm; these spores have between 9 and 13 transverse septa. Carbacanthographis pseudorustica contains protocetraric acid, a lichen product that can be detected using thin-layer chromatography.
