= Carbacanthographis amazonica =

Scientific classification
- Domain: Eukaryota
- Kingdom: Fungi
- Division: Ascomycota
- Class: Lecanoromycetes
- Order: Graphidales
- Family: Graphidaceae
- Genus: Carbacanthographis
- Species: C. amazonica

Binomial name
- Carbacanthographis amazonica Feuerstein & Lücking (2022)

Species of lichen

Carbacanthographis amazonica is a species of corticolous (bark-dwelling) lichen in the family Graphidaceae. Found in the Amazon region of South America, it was formally described as a new species in 2022 by Shirley Cunha Feuerstein and Robert Lücking. The type specimen was collected in Saül (Canton of Maripasoula, French Guiana) at an altitude of 300 to 400 m (980 to 1,310 ft); here it was found in a hilly, moist tropical forest. It has also been recorded in Colombia and Suriname. The lichen has an uneven, greenish to greenish-yellow thallus that lacks a cortex, and has a black prothallus. The specific epithet refers to its distribution in the Amazon region of South America.
