= Carbacanthographis megalospora =

Scientific classification
- Domain: Eukaryota
- Kingdom: Fungi
- Division: Ascomycota
- Class: Lecanoromycetes
- Order: Graphidales
- Family: Graphidaceae
- Genus: Carbacanthographis
- Species: C. megalospora

Binomial name
- Carbacanthographis megalospora Feuerstein & Lücking (2022)

Species of lichen

Carbacanthographis megalospora is a species of corticolous (bark-dwelling) lichen in the family Graphidaceae. Found in Brazil, it was formally described as a new species in 2022 by Shirley Cunha Feuerstein and Robert Lücking. The type specimen was collected by the first author from the Augusto Ruschi Biological Reserve (Santa Teresa, Espírito Santo) at an altitude of 800 m (2,600 ft). The lichen has a whitish grey thallus with a thin cortex and an underlying black prothallus. Its asci contain a single ascospore. These spores are hyaline, and typically measure 235–255 by 30–40 μm. The specific epithet alludes to the large spores, the largest known in genus Carbacanthographis. C. megalospora contains stictic acid, cryptostictic acid, and constictic acid, which are lichen products that can be detected using thin-layer chromatography.
