= Acanthothecis rimosa =

Scientific classification
- Domain: Eukaryota
- Kingdom: Fungi
- Division: Ascomycota
- Class: Lecanoromycetes
- Order: Graphidales
- Family: Graphidaceae
- Genus: Acanthothecis
- Species: A. rimosa

Binomial name
- Acanthothecis rimosa Aptroot, Lücking & M.Cáceres (2022)

Species of lichen

Acanthothecis rimosa is a species of corticolous (bark-dwelling) lichen in the family Graphidaceae. Found in Brazil, it was formally described as a new species in 2022 by André Aptroot, Robert Lücking, and Marcela Eugenia da Silva Cáceres. The type specimen was collected from the Pedra Talhada private area in Quebrangulo (Alagoas) at an elevation between 500 and 700 m (1,600 and 2,300 ft). The lichen has a smooth and somewhat shiny, mineral-grey thallus lacking a cortex, and also lacking a surrounding prothallus. The asci contain two spores. The ascospores are hyaline, ellipsoid, and measure 45–53 by 13–16 μm; they have 15–19 transverse and 3–4 longitudinal septa. Stictic acid, a lichen product, is found in the lichen and is detectable using thin-layer chromatography.
