= Carbacanthographis acanthoamicta =

Scientific classification
- Domain: Eukaryota
- Kingdom: Fungi
- Division: Ascomycota
- Class: Lecanoromycetes
- Order: Graphidales
- Family: Graphidaceae
- Genus: Carbacanthographis
- Species: C. acanthoamicta

Binomial name
- Carbacanthographis acanthoamicta Feuerstein & Lücking (2022)

Species of lichen

Carbacanthographis acanthoamicta is a species of corticolous (bark-dwelling) lichen in the family Graphidaceae. Found in Papua New Guinea, it was formally described as a new species in 2022 by Shirley Cunha Feuerstein and Robert Lücking. The type specimen was collected from a primary montane forest in Myola (Owen Stanley Range, Northern Province) at an altitude of 2,100 m (6,900 ft). It is only known to occur at the type locality. The lichen has an olive to yellowish brown thallus with a thin cortex and an underlying prothallus. Its ascospores number 8 per ascus, are hyaline and measure 17–20 by 8 μm; they have from 7 to seven transverse septa and from 0 to two longitudinal septa. Carbacanthographis acanthoamicta contains salazinic acid, a lichen product than can be detected using thin-layer chromatography. The specific epithet alludes to its similarity with Carbacanthographis amicta.
