= Acanthothecis verrucosa =

Scientific classification
- Domain: Eukaryota
- Kingdom: Fungi
- Division: Ascomycota
- Class: Lecanoromycetes
- Order: Graphidales
- Family: Graphidaceae
- Genus: Acanthothecis
- Species: A. verrucosa

Binomial name
- Acanthothecis verrucosa S.Joshi, Upreti & Hur (2017)

Species of lichen

Acanthothecis verrucosa is a species of lichen in the family Graphidaceae. It is found in southern Vietnam, where it grows on smooth-barked trees in tropical forests. The lichen is characterized by its olive-green, verrucose thallus and the presence of psoromic acid. This species can easily be confused with similar lichens, but it can be distinguished by its specific morphological and chemical features.

== Taxonomy ==
Acanthothecis verrucosa was first described by Santosh Joshi, Dalip Kumar Upreti, and Jae-Seoun Hur as a new species in 2017. The species name, verrucosa, is derived from the Latin word for "warts" and refers to the wart-like appearance of the lichen's thallus. The type specimen was collected from tree bark in Cát Tiên National Park, Vietnam, in December 2015.

== Description ==
This lichen features a hard, glossy thallus that is olive-green, green, or dark green, and forms large patches. Its cortex is 25–45 μm thick, and it hosts a Trentepohlia (green algal) photobiont. The medulla of the lichen is white and crystalline.

The apothecia are irregular to shortly lirellate and labiate, with white labia that can be straight or internally folded. The disc is mostly concealed to slightly exposed and has a white pruinose surface. The ascospores are hyaline, ellipsoidal, and muriform, measuring 35–70 μm long and 15–20 μm wide.

In terms of standard chemical spot tests, Acanthothecis verrucosa tests negative for K and C reactions, while showing a positive yellow reaction for PD. Psoromic and subpsoromic acids have been identified through thin-layer chromatography.

Acanthothecis verrucosa is most similar to Acanthothecis consocians due to the production of psoromic acid. However, it differs in having muriform ascospores. Other species within the genus, such as A. nivalis and A. dialeuca, have different morphological and anatomical characteristics that separate them from A. verrucosa. The presence of psoromic acid, muriform ascospores, and the olive-green, verrucose thallus help to distinguish this species from similar lichens.

== Habitat and distribution ==
Acanthothecis verrucosa is native to the tropical forests of Cát Tiên National Park in southern Vietnam. It is commonly found growing in large patches on thick and relatively smooth-barked trees. The lichen often coexists with other graphidioid and thelotremoid species around the tree trunks.
