= Acanthothecis latispora =

Scientific classification
- Kingdom: Fungi
- Division: Ascomycota
- Class: Lecanoromycetes
- Order: Graphidales
- Family: Graphidaceae
- Genus: Acanthothecis
- Species: A. latispora

Binomial name
- Acanthothecis latispora Feuerstein & Silveira (2022)

Species of lichen-forming fungus

Acanthothecis latispora is a species of corticolous (bark-dwelling) lichen in the family Graphidaceae. Found in Brazil, it was formally described as a new species in 2022 by Shirley Cunha Feuerstein and André da Silveira. The type specimen was collected by the first author from Turvo State Park (Derrubadas, Rio Grande do Sul). Here the lichen was growing on branches in open areas of the Atlantic Forest. It has a whitish to greenish thallus with a black prothallus. Its asci contain a single ascospore; the spores are densely muriform (containing multiple chambers) and measure 82–100 by 27–35 μm. The specific epithet refers to the wide spores. Acanthothecis latispora contains norstictic and stictic acids; these are lichen products that are detectable using thin-layer chromatography.

== See also ==
- List of lichens of Brazil
