= Acanthothecis oryzoides =

Scientific classification
- Domain: Eukaryota
- Kingdom: Fungi
- Division: Ascomycota
- Class: Lecanoromycetes
- Order: Graphidales
- Family: Graphidaceae
- Genus: Acanthothecis
- Species: A. oryzoides

Binomial name
- Acanthothecis oryzoides Aptroot, Lücking & M.Cáceres (2022)

Species of lichen

Acanthothecis oryzoides is a species of corticolous (bark-dwelling) lichen in the family Graphidaceae. Found in Brazil, it was formally described as a new species in 2022 by André Aptroot, Robert Lücking, and Marcela Eugenia da Silva Cáceres. The type specimen was collected in the Parque Natural De Porto Velho (Rondônia) at an altitude of 100 m (330 ft); here, it was found growing on twig bark near a rainforest. The lichen has a dull, glaucous-white thallus, lacking a prothallus. The ascospores are hyaline, ellipsoid, and measure 69–80 by 25–35 μm; they have from 9 to 13 transverse septa with light constrictions at the septa.
