= Carbacanthographis albolirellata =

Scientific classification
- Kingdom: Fungi
- Division: Ascomycota
- Class: Lecanoromycetes
- Order: Graphidales
- Family: Graphidaceae
- Genus: Carbacanthographis
- Species: C. albolirellata

Binomial name
- Carbacanthographis albolirellata B.O.Sharma & Khadilkar (2011)

Species of lichen-forming fungus

Carbacanthographis albolirellata is a species of bark-dwelling crustose lichen in the family Graphidaceae. It occurs in Tamil Nadu, India.

== Taxonomy ==
The species was described as new to science in 2011 by Bharati Sharma and Pradnya Khadilkar, based on herbarium material held at the Ajrekar Mycological Herbarium (AMH). The holotype was collected in India (Tamil Nadu), near Daisy Bank at Kodaikanal, on 25 January 1975. In their diagnosis of the species, Sharma and Khadilkar separated C. albolirellata from close relatives by a completely carbonized (blackened) exciple, somewhat muriform spores (spores with mostly cross-walls plus a few lengthwise walls), and the absence of detectable lichen secondary metabolites. They also compared it directly with C. coccospora, which is similar in overall form but has smaller spores.

== Description ==
The thallus forms a thin, crust-like growth tightly attached to bark (corticolous), and sits on the bark surface (epiphloedal). It is yellowish brown, dull, and rough, with a warty (verrucose) texture and cracking; the colony edge is marked by a thin, black hypothallus. The fruiting bodies are lirellae: black, elongated, slit-like structures that are dusted with white pruina on the surface and black beneath. They are usually simple and straight to slightly curved, about 1–4 mm long, with rounded ends. The exposed disc (fertile spore-bearing surface) is slit-like and lacks pruina. The proper exciple is convergent and completely carbonized, including at the base, and no epithecium is present.

Internally, the spore-bearing layer (hymenium) is clear (hyaline), lacks granular inclusions (not inspersed), gives no reaction with iodine (I−), and is 75–150 μm high; the paraphyses are unbranched. The periphysoids are short and distinctly warty. Each ascus contains eight spores. The ascospores are hyaline and somewhat muriform, with 6–8 transverse septa and 1–2 longitudinal septa per segment, measuring 16–20 × 6–8 μm; in iodine they stain blue-violet (I+). Chemical screening found no lichen substances.

== Habitat and distribution ==
Carbacanthographis albolirellata is a corticolous crustose lichen, known from bark in southern India. The type collection comes from the Kodaikanal area of Tamil Nadu, and the only other cited specimen is from the same locality. As of the original description, the species had been collected only twice, both times from Tamil Nadu in the Western Ghats. The Western Ghats are of particular botanical importance within the Indian subcontinent and rank among India's most biodiverse lichen localities.
