= Acanthothecis subfarinosa =

Scientific classification
- Kingdom: Fungi
- Division: Ascomycota
- Class: Lecanoromycetes
- Order: Graphidales
- Family: Graphidaceae
- Genus: Acanthothecis
- Species: A. subfarinosa

Binomial name
- Acanthothecis subfarinosa Feuerstein (2022)

Species of lichen-forming fungus

Acanthothecis subfarinosa is a species of corticolous (bark-dwelling) lichen in the family Graphidaceae. Found in Brazil, it was formally described as a new species in 2022 by Shirley Feuerstein. The type specimen was collected from remnant cerrado in Campo Mourão (Paraná). The lichen has a greenish, cracked thallus lacking a cortex and lacking a prothallus. The asci contain 8 spores; the ascospores are hyaline, measuring 22–30 by 5 μm with 6 to 8 transverse septa. Acanthothecis subfarinosa contains norstictic acid, a lichen product that is detectable using thin-layer chromatography.

== See also ==
- List of lichens of Brazil
