= Acanthothecis submuriformis =

Scientific classification
- Kingdom: Fungi
- Division: Ascomycota
- Class: Lecanoromycetes
- Order: Graphidales
- Family: Graphidaceae
- Genus: Acanthothecis
- Species: A. submuriformis

Binomial name
- Acanthothecis submuriformis Aptroot, Lücking & M.Cáceres (2022)

Species of lichen-forming fungus

Acanthothecis submuriformis is a species of corticolous (bark-dwelling) lichen in the family Graphidaceae. Found in Brazil, it was formally described as a new species in 2022 by André Aptroot, Robert Lücking, and Marcela Eugenia da Silva M.Cáceres. The type specimen was collected from the Parque Natural Municipal (Porto Velho, Rondônia); there the lichen was found growing on tree bark in primary rainforest.

It has a smooth, ochraceous white thallus lacking a cortex and lacking a prothallus. Its asci are 8-spored, and its ascospores are hyaline, measuring 29–31 by 6–8 μm. The specific epithet refers to the submuriform (somewhat chambered) spores; all spores have between seven and nine transverse septa, but of the eifht spores in the ascus, only about two have a longitudinal septum.

Acanthothecis submuriformis contains lichexanthone, a lichen product that causes the thallus and ascomata margins to fluoresce yellow when lit with a long-wavelength UV light. This species and Acanthothecis tetraphora are the only species in genus Acanthothecis known to produce lichexanthone.

== See also ==
- List of lichens of Brazil
