= Acanthothecis roseola =

Scientific classification
- Domain: Eukaryota
- Kingdom: Fungi
- Division: Ascomycota
- Class: Lecanoromycetes
- Order: Graphidales
- Family: Graphidaceae
- Genus: Acanthothecis
- Species: A. roseola

Binomial name
- Acanthothecis roseola Feuerstein (2022)

Species of lichen

Acanthothecis roseola is a species of corticolous (bark-dwelling) lichen in the family Graphidaceae. Found in Brazil, it was formally described as a new species in 2022 by Shirley Cunha Feuerstein. The type specimen was collected from the Parque Estadual do Papagaio Charão (Sarandi, Rio Grande do Sul). The lichen has a whitish to greenish, cracked thallus with a black prothallus. Crystals of calcium oxalate are abundant below the algal layer and the hamathecium. The lichen contains norstictic acid, stictic acid, and subnorstictic acid, which are lichen products that can be detected using thin-layer chromatography. The specific epithet roseola refers to the pinkish-coloured margins of the ascomata.
