= Acanthothecis saxicola =

Scientific classification
- Kingdom: Fungi
- Division: Ascomycota
- Class: Lecanoromycetes
- Order: Graphidales
- Family: Graphidaceae
- Genus: Acanthothecis
- Species: A. saxicola

Binomial name
- Acanthothecis saxicola Aptroot, Lücking & M.Cáceres (2022)

Species of lichen-forming fungus

Acanthothecis saxicola is a species of saxicolous (rock-dwelling) crustose lichen in the family Graphidaceae. Found in Brazil, it was formally described as a new species in 2022 by André Aptroot, Robert Lücking, and Marcela Cáceres. The type specimen was collected near Poço Azul (Riachão, Maranhão) at an altitude of 450 m (1,480 ft); there, in a cerrado forest, it was found growing on an overhanging sandstone. The lichen has an ochraceous white thallus lacking a cortex and a prothallus. Its asci contains eight spores, and the ascospores are hyaline, measuring 22–30 by 5 μm with 6 to 8 transverse septa. Acanthothecis saxicola contains stictic acid, a lichen product detectable using thin-layer chromatography.

== See also ==
- List of lichens of Brazil
