= Carbacanthographis spongiosa =

Scientific classification
- Domain: Eukaryota
- Kingdom: Fungi
- Division: Ascomycota
- Class: Lecanoromycetes
- Order: Graphidales
- Family: Graphidaceae
- Genus: Carbacanthographis
- Species: C. spongiosa

Binomial name
- Carbacanthographis spongiosa Feuerstein & Lücking (2022)

Species of lichen

Carbacanthographis spongiosa is a species of corticolous (bark-dwelling) lichen in the family Graphidaceae. Found in Brazil, it was formally described as a new species in 2022 by Shirley Cunha Feuerstein and Robert Lücking. The type specimen was collected from Atlantic Forest on a private property in Santa Luzia do Itanhy (Sergipe). The specific epithet spongiosa refers to the spongy texture of the thallus surface.

The lichen has a greenish thallus lacking a cortex, and with prothallus; the thallus is perforated with numerous tiny holes that give it a spongy appearance. It has hyaline ascospores that measure 23–25 by 6–7 μm; these spores have between 6 and 8 transverse septa. Carbacanthographis spongiosa contains stictic acid and cryptostictic acid, which are lichen products that can be detected using thin-layer chromatography.
