= Carbacanthographis sipmaniana =

Scientific classification
- Domain: Eukaryota
- Kingdom: Fungi
- Division: Ascomycota
- Class: Lecanoromycetes
- Order: Graphidales
- Family: Graphidaceae
- Genus: Carbacanthographis
- Species: C. sipmaniana

Binomial name
- Carbacanthographis sipmaniana Feuerstein & Lücking (2022)

Species of lichen

Carbacanthographis sipmaniana is a species of corticolous (bark-dwelling) lichen in the family Graphidaceae. Found in Malaysia, it was formally described as a new species in 2022 by Shirley Cunha Feuerstein and Robert Lücking. The type specimen was collected from a montane rainforest in Kinabalu Park (Kota Belud, Sabah), at an elevation of 1,800 m (5,900 ft). It is only known to occur at the type locality. The specific epithet sipmaniana honours lichenologist Harrie Sipman, "in recognition of his valuable contribution to tropical lichenology".

The lichen has a greyish brown to yellowish grey thallus lacking a cortex and a black prothallus. It has hyaline ascospores that measure 17–20 by 6–8 μm; these spores have between 5 and 7 transverse septa. Carbacanthographis pseudorustica contains norstictic acid and connorstictic acid, which are lichen products that can be detected using thin-layer chromatography.
