= Carbacanthographis novoguineensis =

Scientific classification
- Domain: Eukaryota
- Kingdom: Fungi
- Division: Ascomycota
- Class: Lecanoromycetes
- Order: Graphidales
- Family: Graphidaceae
- Genus: Carbacanthographis
- Species: C. novoguineensis

Binomial name
- Carbacanthographis novoguineensis Feuerstein & Lücking (2022)

Species of lichen

Carbacanthographis novoguineensis is a species of corticolous (bark-dwelling) lichen in the family Graphidaceae. Found in Papua New Guinea, it was formally described as a new species in 2022 by Shirley Cunha Feuerstein and Robert Lücking. The type specimen was collected by André Aptroot in Myola (Owen Stanley Range, Northern Province) at an altitude between 2,100 and 2,400 m (6,900 and 7,900 ft). It is only known to occur at the type locality.

The lichen has a greenish to brownish grey thallus lacking both a cortex and a prothallus. It has hyaline ascospores that measure 15–20 by 8–10 μm; these spores have 5 transverse septa and 0 or 1 longitudinal septum. The specific epithet novoguineensis refers to the country from which it was first documented. Carbacanthographis novoguineensis contains salazinic acid, a lichen product that can be detected using thin-layer chromatography.
