= Carbacanthographis acanthoparaphysata =

Scientific classification
- Domain: Eukaryota
- Kingdom: Fungi
- Division: Ascomycota
- Class: Lecanoromycetes
- Order: Graphidales
- Family: Graphidaceae
- Genus: Carbacanthographis
- Species: C. acanthoparaphysata

Binomial name
- Carbacanthographis acanthoparaphysata Feuerstein & Lücking (2022)

Species of lichen

Carbacanthographis acanthoparaphysata is a species of corticolous (bark-dwelling) lichen in the family Graphidaceae. Found in Papua New Guinea, it was formally described as a new species in 2022 by Shirley Cunha Feuerstein and Robert Lücking. The type specimen was collected by André Aptroot from a primary montane forest in Myola (Owen Stanley Range, Northern Province) at an altitude between 2,100 and 2,400 m (6,900 and 7,900 ft). It is only known to occur at the type locality. The lichen has a whitish-grey to pale yellowish thallus lacking a cortex, but with a black prothallus. Its ascospores number eight per ascus, and are hyaline, measuring 17–20 by 8 μm; they have from 4 to 6 transverse septa and from 0 to 2 longitudinal septa. The specific epithet refers to the paraphyses, which give it an apically warty appearance. Carbacanthographis acanthoparaphysata contains protocetraric acid, a lichen product that can be detected using thin-layer chromatography.
