= Acanthothecis coccinea =

Scientific classification
- Kingdom: Fungi
- Division: Ascomycota
- Class: Lecanoromycetes
- Order: Graphidales
- Family: Graphidaceae
- Genus: Acanthothecis
- Species: A. coccinea

Binomial name
- Acanthothecis coccinea B.O.Sharma, Makhija & Khadilkar (2010)

Species of lichen-forming fungus

Acanthothecis coccinea is a species of corticolous (bark-dwelling) script lichen in the family Graphidaceae. It is distinguished by its elongated fruiting bodies, which appear pale when dry but turn bright scarlet-red when moistened. The species is known only from subtropical forest in Meghalaya, north-eastern India.

== Taxonomy ==
Acanthothecis coccinea was described as new to science in 2010 by Bharati Sharma, Urmila Makhija and Pradnya Khadilkar, based on material collected in the Indian state of Meghalaya. The type specimen was gathered at Mawphlang on 11 December 1978 by M.B. Nagarkar (collection 78.315), and the holotype is housed in the Ajrekar Mycological Herbarium (AMH).

In the original description, the authors treated it as most similar to Acanthothecis collateralis, but separated it by its smaller ascospores. They also distinguished it from other superficially similar species using a combination of characters, including its small, 3-septate spores, a hymenium that contains scattered oil droplets (inspersed), and the presence of norstictic acid as its main lichen product.

== Description ==
The lichen forms a pale whitish to grey-tinged, bark-dwelling thallus that is irregularly cracked and powdery, with many colourless crystals visible on the surface. Its fruiting bodies are numerous and lirellate (elongate and slit-like), about 0.5–1 mm long, mostly simple but sometimes branched, and usually immersed to only slightly raised, often occurring in small irregular groups. The exposed disc is narrow and slit-like. It appears pale when dry but becomes bright scarlet-red when wet, and is dusted with a white coating (pruinose). The exciple is brown, not grooved, and mainly developed at the base of the ascoma.

Microscopically, the hymenium is colourless and inspersed, 37–62 μm tall, and iodine-negative (I−, KI−). The paraphyses are slender and warty at the tips, and the periphysoids are distinct, up to about 10 μm long, with weakly warted tips. The asci are 8-spored, and the ascospores are hyaline, contain three septa, and measure 12–14 × 3–4 μm (also I−, KI−). Norstictic acid was detected by thin-layer chromatography, and the thallus gives a K+ (yellow turning red) reaction.

== Habitat and distribution ==
Acanthothecis coccinea grows on bark in subtropical forest. It is known only from Meghalaya in north-eastern India, where it has been collected once from the Mawphlang area. The type locality lies at roughly 1,300–2,000 m elevation in a high-rainfall region.
