= Carbacanthographis aptrootii =

Scientific classification
- Domain: Eukaryota
- Kingdom: Fungi
- Division: Ascomycota
- Class: Lecanoromycetes
- Order: Graphidales
- Family: Graphidaceae
- Genus: Carbacanthographis
- Species: C. aptrootii

Binomial name
- Carbacanthographis aptrootii Feuerstein & Lücking (2022)

Species of lichen

Carbacanthographis aptrootii is a species of corticolous (bark-dwelling) lichen in the family Graphidaceae. Found in Yunnan, China, it was formally described as a new species in 2022 by Shirley Cunha Feuerstein and Robert Lücking. The type specimen was collected in Xishuangbanna Primeval Forest Park (Xishuangbanna, Yunnan) at an altitude of 600 m (2,000 ft). It is only known to occur at the type locality. It has a greyish to yellowish grey thallus that lacks both a cortex and a prothallus. It contains norstictic acid, a lichen product that can be detected using thin-layer chromatography. The collector of the type, Dutch lichenologist André Aptroot, is honoured in the specific epithet "for his numerous, important contributions to tropical lichenology".
