= Acanthothecis archeri =

Scientific classification
- Kingdom: Fungi
- Division: Ascomycota
- Class: Lecanoromycetes
- Order: Graphidales
- Family: Graphidaceae
- Genus: Acanthothecis
- Species: A. archeri

Binomial name
- Acanthothecis archeri B.O.Sharma, Makhija & Khadilkar (2010)

Species of lichen-forming fungus

Acanthothecis archeri is a species of corticolous (bark-dwelling) script lichen in the family Graphidaceae. It has a yellowish to reddish-brown crust with elongated, pale cream fruiting bodies. The species is found in tropical rainforests and moist deciduous woodlands in India, including the Andaman and Nicobar Islands and Karnataka.

== Taxonomy ==
Acanthothecis archeri was described as a new species in 2010 by Bharati Sharma, Urmila Makhija and Pradnya Khadilkar, based on Indian material studied during a revision of Acanthothecis from the country. The type specimen was collected in the Andaman Islands (North Andaman, Diglipur range, Sitapur) on 28 January 1986 by P.K. Sethy and P.G. Patwardhan, and is housed in the Ajrekar Mycological Herbarium (AMH).

In overall appearance, the species was compared most closely with Acanthothecis subclavulifera, but it differs in having muriform ascospores (divided by both transverse and longitudinal walls), rather than only transversely septate spores. Sharma and colleagues also separated it from similar-looking species by a combination of features, including its non-grooved exciple and the absence of detectable lichen substances in chemical tests (in contrast to lookalikes reported to contain compounds such as protocetraric, stictic/constictic, or norstictic acids).

== Description ==
The lichen forms a thick, crust-like thallus on bark that is yellowish to reddish brown, irregularly cracked, rough to the touch, and slightly glossy, with a black bordering hypothallus. Its fruiting bodies are numerous and pale cream, appearing as mealy (farinose) elongated lirellae about 0.3–10 mm long. They may be straight, curved, or irregular in outline, and sit raised above the thallus with rounded ends and a thick thalline margin. The exposed disc is slit-like, looking yellowish to cream and dusted when dry, and turning browner when wet.

In section, the proper exciple is reddish brown and present mainly at the base, narrowing inward and becoming swollen towards the top. It is partly covered by the thalline margin and has a distinct orange-yellow pseudocortex about 10–12 μm thick. The hymenium is clear (not inspersed) and 150–162 μm tall. The paraphyses are simple and slender with warty tips, and the periphysoids are short and weakly warted at their tips. The asci contain 4–6 spores. The ascospores are hyaline (colourless) and muriform, measuring 75–120 × 22–37 μm. No lichen secondary metabolites were detected by thin-layer chromatography.

Acanthothecis archeri is similar to Acanthothecis salazinica in having emergent ascomata with creamy, pruinose discs, an entire (non-striate) exciple, and large ascospores about 75–120 μm long. It differs, however, in lacking detectable thallus compounds and in having muriform ascospores that react weakly blue with iodine (I+ pale blue).

== Habitat and distribution ==
Acanthothecis archeri grows on exposed tree trunks, with collections coming from tropical rainforest as well as from moist deciduous woodland. It is a corticolous species (living on bark), consistent with the type material and the other known specimens cited in the original description.

The species is known from India, recorded from the Andaman and Nicobar Islands (including North Andaman and the Nicobar group) and from Karnataka on the mainland. In addition to the type locality at Sitapur (North Andaman), published specimens include material from Mayabunder (North Andaman), Kamorta Island (Nicobars), and several sites in Karnataka (including the Kumta–Sirsi road area and Hebri).
