= Acanthothecis aquilonia =

Scientific classification
- Domain: Eukaryota
- Kingdom: Fungi
- Division: Ascomycota
- Class: Lecanoromycetes
- Order: Graphidales
- Family: Graphidaceae
- Genus: Acanthothecis
- Species: A. aquilonia

Binomial name
- Acanthothecis aquilonia A.W.Archer & Elix, 2008

Species of lichen

Holotype site: Kakadu National Park'"`UNIQ--ref-00000005-QINU`"'

Acanthothecis aquilonia is a species of corticolous lichen in the family Graphidaceae, and was first described in 2008 by Alan Archer and John Alan Elix. The holotype (CANB 769685.1) was collected in Australia's Kakadu National Park from a tree trunk in lowland monsoon forest, on 10 August 2005 by Alan Archer.
