= Acanthothecis borealis =

Scientific classification
- Domain: Eukaryota
- Kingdom: Fungi
- Division: Ascomycota
- Class: Lecanoromycetes
- Order: Graphidales
- Family: Graphidaceae
- Genus: Acanthothecis
- Species: A. borealis

Binomial name
- Acanthothecis borealis A.W.Archer & Elix (2007)

Species of lichen

Acanthothecis borealis is a rare species of corticolous (bark-dwelling) script lichen in the family Graphidaceae. Found only in the Northern Territory in Australia, it was described as new to science by Australian lichenologists Alan W. Archer and John Elix in 2007. The species is characterized by its inconspicuous lirellae, which are apothecia that are simple, straight, curved, or sinuous (bendy) in shape, with lips closed and a conspicuous thalline margin, and the presence of protocetraric acid. The thallus of this species is off-white to pale grey. It has elongate-ellipsoid ascospores that do not change colour with iodine and have fewer locules (16–18) compared to similar species. The type specimen was collected by the second author from Berry Springs Nature Park in the Northern Territory, where it was found growing of the twigs of a small tree.
