= Anomomorpha tuberculata =

Scientific classification
- Domain: Eukaryota
- Kingdom: Fungi
- Division: Ascomycota
- Class: Lecanoromycetes
- Order: Graphidales
- Family: Graphidaceae
- Genus: Anomomorpha
- Species: A. tuberculata

Binomial name
- Anomomorpha tuberculata Lücking, Umaña & Will-Wolf (2011)

Species of lichen

Anomomorpha tuberculata is a species of corticolous (bark-dwelling) crustose lichen in the family Graphidaceae. Found in rare cerrado vegetation in southern Costa Rica, it was described as new to science in 2011. It is characterised by its conspicuous tubercles on the thallus and sessile lirellae.

== Taxonomy ==
Anomomorpha tuberculata was first formally described by lichenologists Robert Lücking, Loengrin Umaña-Tenorio, and Susan Will-Wolf in 2011. The type specimen was collected in Costa Rica, specifically in the Cerro Biolley Section of La Amistad International Park, at an altitude between 1,300 and 1,400 m (4,300 and 4,600 ft). The species epithet tuberculata refers to the prominent tubercles on the thallus.

This lichen species is placed in the genus Anomomorpha due to its non-carbonized lirellae with strongly inspersed hymenium and minute ascospores. However, it deviates from other species in the genus because of its sessile lirellae and the absence of secondary substances. The large tubercles formed on the thallus are also unique within the Graphidaceae, making Anomomorpha tuberculata a distinct species.

== Description ==
The thallus of Anomomorpha tuberculata can reach up to 10 cm (4 in) in diameter. Its surface is uneven and grey to pale brownish or yellowish grey, featuring numerous large tubercles. These tubercles are orbicular with a constricted base and consist of numerous corticate, angular plates (schizidia) that eventually break off to expose a soredia-like surface. A similar type of squamule-like schizidia also occurs in the Malaysian species Myriotrema squamiferum.

Apothecia are angular-rounded to elongate and sessile, with a thick and prominent thalline margin. The disc is grey-brown with white pruina, giving it a grey-pruinose appearance. Ascospores are ellipsoid, 3-septate, and colourless, measuring 7–10 by 5–6 μm.

No secondary substances have been detected in Anomomorpha tuberculata.

== Habitat and distribution ==
Anomomorpha tuberculata has been found in the rare cerrado vegetation in the southern part of Costa Rica, specifically in La Amistad International Park. Additional specimens have been discovered in Alajuela, Costa Rica, as well as in Venezuela and Guyana.
