= Carbacanthographis tetrinspersa =

Scientific classification
- Domain: Eukaryota
- Kingdom: Fungi
- Division: Ascomycota
- Class: Lecanoromycetes
- Order: Graphidales
- Family: Graphidaceae
- Genus: Carbacanthographis
- Species: C. tetrinspersa

Binomial name
- Carbacanthographis tetrinspersa Aptroot (2022)

Species of lichen

Carbacanthographis tetrinspersa is a species of corticolous (bark-dwelling) script lichen in the family Graphidaceae. Found in the primary rainforests of Mato Grosso, Brazil, C. tetrinspersa is named for its characteristic ascospores and inspersed hymenium.

== Taxonomy ==
Described by the Dutch lichenologist André Aptroot in 2022, Carbacanthographis tetrinspersa is characterized by its distinctive lirellae (a type of fruiting body) with a pruinose (frosty appearance) disc and labia top, and its clavate (club-shaped) 3-septate (divided into three sections) ascospores. The species name tetrinspersa refers to the four-loculate (four-chambered) ascospores and the inspersed hymenium (the tissue layer containing the spore-producing asci).

== Description ==
The thallus of Carbacanthographis tetrinspersa is crustose (forming a crust-like layer) and continuous, closely adhering to the surface of the bark on which it grows. It has a dull, dirty white appearance and can cover areas up to 15 cm (5.9 in) in diameter, with a thickness of up to 0.1 mm. The photobiont (the algal partner in the lichen symbiosis) is trentepohlioid, a type of green algae.

Ascomata (spore-producing structures) are erumpent (breaking through the thallus surface), solitary, and superficial, with linear, wavy, and often branched lirellae. The excipulum (the outer layer of the ascomata) is completely carbonised.

Chemically, the thallus tests negative in UV light, C, K, KC, and P spot test reactions but shows a positive reaction for K (turning yellow). Thin-layer chromatography reveals the presence of stictic acid, a compound relatively rare in the Graphidaceae but known in genus Carbacanthographis.

== Habitat and distribution ==
This lichen grows on tree bark in primary rainforests, with its known distribution limited to its type locality in Brazil.
