= Carbacanthographis subalbotecta =

Scientific classification
- Domain: Eukaryota
- Kingdom: Fungi
- Division: Ascomycota
- Class: Lecanoromycetes
- Order: Graphidales
- Family: Graphidaceae
- Genus: Carbacanthographis
- Species: C. subalbotecta

Binomial name
- Carbacanthographis subalbotecta Staiger & Kalb (2002)

Species of lichen

Carbacanthographis subalbotecta is a species of corticolous (bark-dwelling) script lichen in the family Graphidaceae. The species was formally described by the German lichenologists Bettina Staiger and Klaus Kalb in 2002. The type specimen was collected by the second author between Jaciara and São Vicente, about 100 km east-southeast of Cuiabá (Mato Grosso, Brazil); there, at an elevation of about 750 m (2,460 ft), it was found growing in a cerrado habitat. The lichen contains two secondary metabolites (lichen products): lichexanthone and protocetraric acid.
