= Acanthothecis megalospora =

Scientific classification
- Domain: Eukaryota
- Kingdom: Fungi
- Division: Ascomycota
- Class: Lecanoromycetes
- Order: Graphidales
- Family: Graphidaceae
- Genus: Acanthothecis
- Species: A. megalospora

Binomial name
- Acanthothecis megalospora Feuerstein & Lücking (2022)

Species of lichen

Acanthothecis megalospora is a species of corticolous (bark-dwelling) lichen in the family Graphidaceae. Found in Brazil, it was formally described as a new species in 2022 by Shirley Cunha Feuerstein and Robert Lücking. The type specimen was collected from a São Paulo farm near Itaguatins (Tocantins); here it was found growing on tree bark in cerrado. The lichen has a whitish grey thallus. Its asci contain a single, more or less rectangular ascospore (measuring 135–185 by 27–30 μm) with 15 to 17 transverse septa. The specific epithet refers to these large spores. Acanthothecis megalospora contains norstictic acid, connorstictic acid, and protocetraric acid, which are lichen products than can be detected using thin-layer chromatography.
