= Acanthothecis norstictica =

Scientific classification
- Domain: Eukaryota
- Kingdom: Fungi
- Division: Ascomycota
- Class: Lecanoromycetes
- Order: Graphidales
- Family: Graphidaceae
- Genus: Acanthothecis
- Species: A. norstictica

Binomial name
- Acanthothecis norstictica Aptroot, Lücking & M.Cáceres (2022)

Species of lichen

Acanthothecis norstictica is a species of corticolous (bark-dwelling) lichen in the family Graphidaceae. Found in Brazil, it was formally described as a new species in 2022 by André Aptroot, Robert Lücking, and Marcela Eugenia da Silva Cáceres. The type specimen was collected from a farm near Itaguatins (Tocantins), where it was found growing on tree bark in cerrado. The lichen contains norstictic acid, the presence of which is referred to in the specific epithet norstictica.
