= Carbacanthographis indica =

Scientific classification
- Kingdom: Fungi
- Division: Ascomycota
- Class: Lecanoromycetes
- Order: Graphidales
- Family: Graphidaceae
- Genus: Carbacanthographis
- Species: C. indica

Binomial name
- Carbacanthographis indica B.O.Sharma & Khadilkar (2011)

Species of lichen-forming fungus

Carbacanthographis indica is a species of bark-dwelling crustose lichen in the family Graphidaceae. It occurs in Meghalaya, India.

== Taxonomy ==
The species was described as new to science in 2011 by Bharati Sharma and Pradnya Khadilkar, based on material housed in the Ajrekar Mycological Herbarium (AMH). Their Latin diagnosis states that it resembles C. marcescens but differs in having spores with transversely arranged septa (trans-septate). The holotype was collected in the Garo Hills of Meghalaya (India), from a Lagerstroemia forest on 5 November 1977. In the original account, C. indica is defined by a laterally carbonized (blackened) exciple, trans-septate ascospores, and the presence of salazinic acid. In their comparisons, the authors note that C. marcescens (the other species reported with salazinic acid and a laterally carbonized exciple) differs in having smaller, muriform (multi-chambered) spores. They also distinguish C. indica from morphologically similar species such as C. induta and C. iriomotensis by chemistry, and discuss Graphis garoana as a related Indian species that fits Carbacanthographis but has much longer lirellae and contains norstictic acid in addition to salazinic acid.

== Description ==
The thallus of Carbacanthographis indica is a crust tightly attached to bark (corticolous) that is greyish white, flat, and variably smooth to rough, with cracking. The thallus margin is defined by a black hypothallus. The fruiting bodies are lirellae, which are conspicuous and often the same colour as the thallus, with a clearly raised thalline margin. They are usually irregularly branched and partly break through the thallus surface (erumpent), measuring about 1–5 mm long, with pointed ends. The exposed disc is slit-like and lacks pruina. The wall around the slit-like fruiting body (proper exciple) narrows towards the opening, is blackened and hardened along the sides (carbonized), and has a distinctly orange-brown base.

Microscopically, the hymenium is clear (hyaline), lacks granular inclusions (not inspersed), shows no iodine staining reaction (I−), and is 87–137 μm high. The paraphyses are simple, and the periphysoids are short and only faintly warty. Each ascus contains eight spores. The ascospores are hyaline and trans-septate, with 10–15 transverse septa, measuring 25–70 × 7.5–10 μm; in iodine they show only a weak positive colour change. Chemical tests detected salazinic acid as the sole lichen product.

== Habitat and distribution ==
Carbacanthographis indica is a bark-dwelling crustose lichen known from Meghalaya in north-eastern India. The holotype was collected in the Garo Hills in a Lagerstroemia forest, and the additional cited specimens are also from the Garo Hills. Meghalaya is extremely rich in biodiversity and includes several endemic lichen species.
