= Acanthothecis nivalis =

Scientific classification
- Kingdom: Fungi
- Division: Ascomycota
- Class: Lecanoromycetes
- Order: Graphidales
- Family: Graphidaceae
- Genus: Acanthothecis
- Species: A. nivalis

Binomial name
- Acanthothecis nivalis Makhija & Adaw. (2003)

Species of lichen

Acanthothecis nivalis is a species of corticolous (bark-dwelling) script lichen in the family Graphidaceae. It was formally described as a new species in 2003 by Urmila Makhija and Bharanti Adawadkar. The species epithet nivalis refers to the distinctive snow-white appearance of its fruiting bodies. It occurs in the Andaman Islands in the northeastern Indian Ocean, where it grows on tree trunks in moist forests.

== Description ==
The thallus (vegetative body) is corticolous (growing on bark), brownish in colour, and has an irregularly cracked, rimose texture. It typically measures 3–3.5 cm across and is epruinose. The thallus features a distinctive black hypothalloid zone at its periphery, which is studded with numerous colourless crystals.

The ascocarps (fruiting bodies) are conspicuously white with a lirellate (elongated and groove-like) form, raised above the thallus surface. These structures range from simple to branched, appear slender, and measure approximately 2–8 mm in length and 0.25 mm in width. They have acute ends, though the disc is not readily visible until it appears brown, very narrow, and slit-like when mature.

The excipulum (outer protective tissue) is non-carbonized, pale orange-brown, entire to striate, and convergent. The hymenium (spore-producing layer) measures about 58–63 μm in height and is clear. Chemical spot tests are K−, C−, KC−, P+ (yellow), and UV−; psoromic acid is a secondary metabolite (lichen products) made by A. nivalis.

Acanthothecis kalbii is a related species that shares certain taxonomic features with A. nivalis. This Brazilian species is characterized by oblong lirellae with grey-white pruinose discs, spiny paraphyses-tips and periphysoids, an uncarbonized excipulum, and hyaline ascospores that are transversely 3–5-septate measuring 9–15 by 4–5 μm. While both species have similar ascospore dimensions and septation patterns, as well as the distinctive spiny structures on both paraphyses tips and periphysoids, several key differences exist. A. nivalis can be readily distinguished by its more prominent and considerably longer lirellae (2–8 mm compared to 0.3–0.9 mm in A. kalbii), discs that remain largely concealed rather than exposed, and different chemistry, containing psoromic acid (K–) instead of the norstictic acid (K+ yellow-red) found in A. kalbii.

== Habitat and distribution ==
Acanthothecis nivalis has been documented growing on tree trunks in both moist deciduous forests of North Andaman and evergreen forests of Middle Andaman. These habitats feature tropical vegetation dominated by Dipterocarpus and rich in Pterocarpus and Mesua ferrea tree species. This lichen is part of the corticolous lichen flora that predominates in these island ecosystems. Acanthothecis nivalis is one of four Acanthothecis species that have been documented from India (as of 2015).
