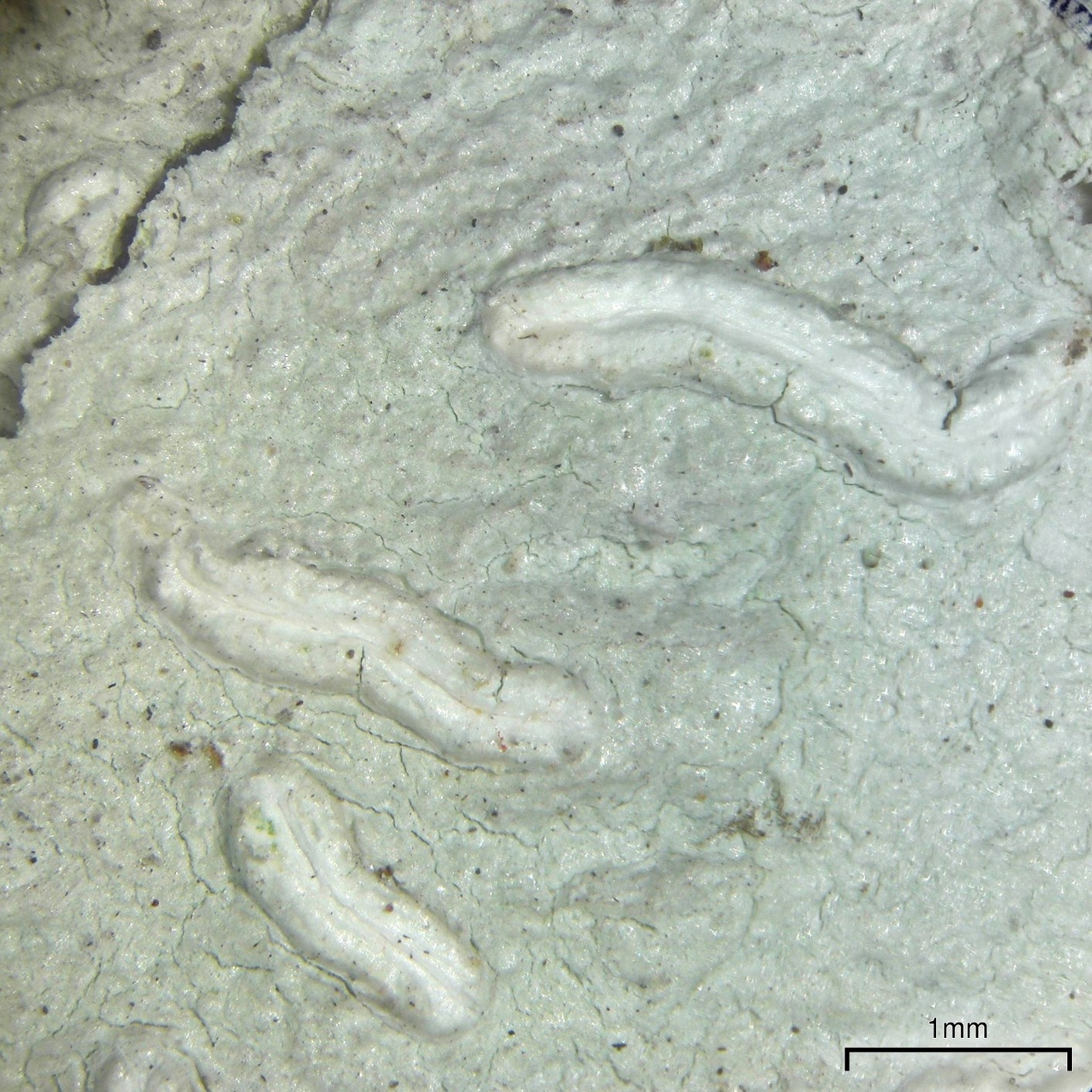
- Acanthothecis abaphoides

Scientific classification
- Kingdom: Fungi
- Division: Ascomycota
- Class: Lecanoromycetes
- Order: Graphidales
- Family: Graphidaceae
- Genus: Acanthothecis; Clem. (1909)

Type species
- Acanthothecis pachygraphoides (Vain.) Clem. (1909)

Species
- See text

= Acanthothecis =

Genus of lichen-forming fungi

Acanthothecis is a genus of lichen-forming fungi in the family Graphidaceae. The genus was circumscribed by Frederick Edward Clements in 1909. These lichens form pale grey-brown to olive-green crusts on tree bark and are characterized by elongated, pencil-like slits containing spores, with distinctive tiny spines on internal filaments that help distinguish them from similar genera. The genus includes about 50 species found primarily in tropical and subtropical forests worldwide, where they grow on living tree bark and serve as indicators of relatively undisturbed woodland environments.

== Description ==
Acanthothecis forms a pale grey-brown to olive-green crust (thallus) that may lack a skin (cortex) or bear a thin one, and often contains scattered crystals that give a slightly granular texture. Its fruit bodies are lirellae—elongated, pencil-like slits—ranging from immersed to sitting on the surface; their lips are usually well developed and can be smooth or faintly striate. The rim that encircles each lirella (excipulum) is generally colourless rather than the charcoal-black seen in many relatives, and it houses minute filaments (periphysoids and paraphyses) whose tips are armed with tiny spines—an unusual diagnostic trait in the family. Inside, the hymenium (spore-bearing layer) does not stain blue in iodine tests (non-amyloid) and is usually clear, while the asci are of the Graphis-type and release two to eight hyaline ascospores that are distoseptate—divided by thin inner walls that give each compartment a lens-shaped outline—and typically show no iodine reaction (I–).

Secondary metabolites vary between species and may include norstictic, stictic, protocetraric acid or psoromic acids, the yellow pigment lichexanthone, or the anthraquinone isohypocrellin.

Morphologically the genus clusters into three informal groups. A. obscura has a dark brown excipulum and an inspersed (grainy) hymenium; the A. hololeucoides group features a grey to pale yellowish thallus with mainly smooth lirellae; and the A. subclavulifera group shows an olive thallus with conspicuously striate lips. The combination of spinulose filaments, predominantly non-carbonised rim, and I– spores separates Acanthothecis from superficially similar genera such as Anomalographis, Anomomorpha, Fissurina, Gymnographopsis and Hemithecium, all of which lack one or more of these features.

== Ecology ==
Acanthothecis occurs across the humid to seasonally dry tropics and subtropics worldwide. They are predominantly corticolous, growing on the bark of living trees in primary or only lightly disturbed evergreen forests, where they tolerate both shaded and moderately exposed microhabitats. Because the genus favours intact forest canopies, several species are considered indicators of relatively undisturbed woodland and may decline with intensive logging or land conversion.

== Species ==
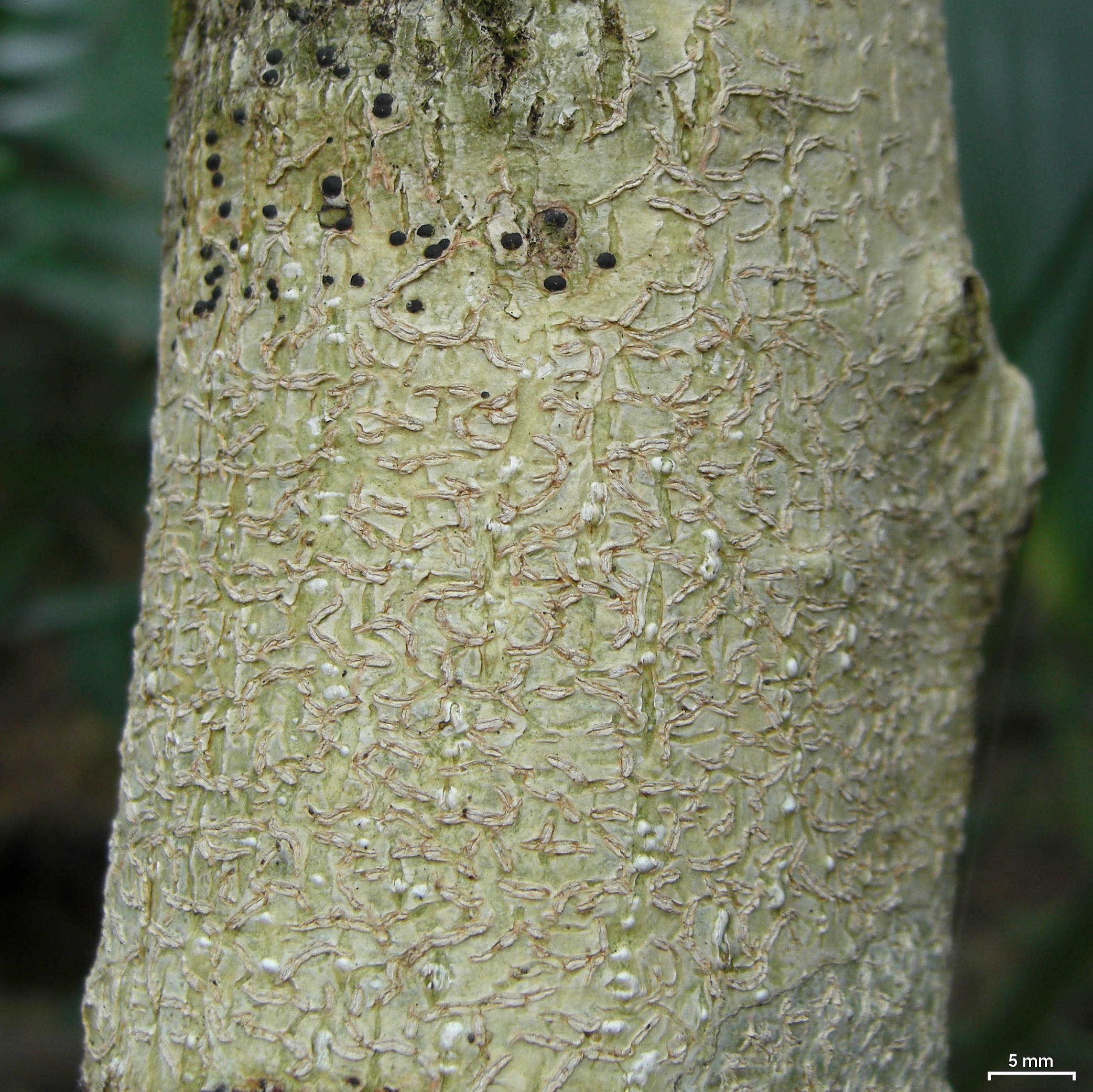
Acanthothecis peplophora

As of June 2025, Species Fungorum (in the Catalogue of Life) accepts 56 species of Acanthothecis.

- Acanthothecis abaphoides (Nyl.) Staiger & Kalb (1999)
- Acanthothecis adjuncta Welz & Sipman (2014)
- Acanthothecis africana Staiger & Kalb (2002)
- Acanthothecis aggregata Aptroot, Lücking & M.Cáceres (2023) – Brazil
- Acanthothecis alba Herrera-Camp., Barcenas-Peña & Lücking (2019) – Mexico
- Acanthothecis aquilonia A.W.Archer & Elix (2008) – Australia
- Acanthothecis archeri B.O.Sharma, Makhija & Khadilkar (2010) – India
- Acanthothecis asprocarpa (A.W.Archer) A.W.Archer (2007)
- Acanthothecis aurantiaca (Müll. Arg.) Staiger & Kalb (2002)
- Acanthothecis aurantiacodiscus Weerakoon, Lücking & Lumbsch (2014)
- Acanthothecis bicellularis (Sipman & Lücking) Lücking (2022) – Brazil
- Acanthothecis bicellulata Staiger & Kalb (2022) – Brazil
- Acanthothecis borealis A.W.Archer & Elix (2007) – Australia
- Acanthothecis celata B.O.Sharma, Makhija & Khadilkar (2010) – India
- Acanthothecis coccinea B.O.Sharma, Makhija & Khadilkar (2010) – India
- Acanthothecis collateralis Makhija & Adaw. (2007) – India
- Acanthothecis dialeuca (Kremp.) Staiger & Kalb (2002)
- Acanthothecis dialeucoides Kalb & Staiger (2009) – Thailand
- Acanthothecis farinosa Staiger & Kalb (2022) – Brazil
- Acanthothecis floridana Lendemer & R.C.Harris (2014) – United States
- Acanthothecis floridensis Seavey & J.Seavey (2017) – United States
- Acanthothecis fontana Muscavitch & Lendemer (2016) – United States
- Acanthothecis gracilis Staiger & Kalb (1999)
- Acanthothecis gyridia (Stirt.) A.W.Archer (2005)
- Acanthothecis kalbii Dal-Forno & Eliasaro (2009)
- Acanthothecis latispora Feuerstein & Silveira (2022) – Brazil
- Acanthothecis leucopepla (Tuck.) E.A.Tripp & Lendemer (2010)
- Acanthothecis leucoxanthoides Lendemer (2014) – United States
- Acanthothecis maritima van den Boom & Sipman (2013) – Panama
- Acanthothecis megalospora Feuerstein & Lücking (2022) – Brazil
- Acanthothecis mosquitensis (Tuck.) E.A.Tripp & Lendemer (2010)
- Acanthothecis multiseptata Aptroot, Lücking & M.Cáceres (2022) – Brazil
- Acanthothecis nivalis Makhija & Adaw. (2003) – India
- Acanthothecis norstictica Aptroot, Lücking & M.Cáceres (2022) – Brazil
- Acanthothecis oryzoides Aptroot, Lücking & M.Cáceres (2022) – Brazil
- Acanthothecis pachygraphoides (Vain.) Clem. (1909)
- Acanthothecis paucispora Lendemer & R.C.Harris (2014) – United States
- Acanthothecis peplophora (M.Wirth & Hale) E.A.Tripp & Lendemer (2010)
- Acanthothecis poitaeoides (Nyl. ex Tuck.) E.A.Tripp & Lendemer (2010)
- Acanthothecis pruinocarpa Dal-Forno & Eliasaro (2009)
- Acanthothecis rimosa Aptroot, Lücking & M.Cáceres (2022) – Brazil
- Acanthothecis rosea (Vain.) Staiger & Kalb (2002)
- Acanthothecis roseola Feuerstein (2022) – Brazil
- Acanthothecis salazinica van den Boom & Sipman (2013) – Panama
- Acanthothecis sarcographoides M.Cáceres & Lücking (2013) – Brazil
- Acanthothecis saxicola Aptroot, Lücking & M.Cáceres (2022) – Brazil
- Acanthothecis socotrana (Müll.Arg.) Staiger & Kalb (2002)
- Acanthothecis subabaphoides Staiger & Kalb (2022) – Brazil
- Acanthothecis subaggregans (Müll.Arg.) A.W.Archer (2005)
- Acanthothecis subclavulifera Staiger & Kalb (2002)
- Acanthothecis subconsocians Pooja Gupta & G.P.Sinha (2015) – India
- Acanthothecis subfarinosa Feuerstein (2022) – Brazil
- Acanthothecis submuriformis Aptroot, Lücking & M.Cáceres (2022) – Brazil
- Acanthothecis tetraphora (Nyl.) Staiger & Kalb (1999)
- Acanthothecis verrucosa S.Joshi, Upreti & Hur (2017) – Vietnam
- Acanthothecis virgulicola Kantvilas (2010) – Tasmania
- Acanthothecis yokdonensis S.Joshi & Hur (2017) – Vietnam

Former species; A. salazinica S. Joshi & Hur (2013) = Acanthothecis yokdonensis
