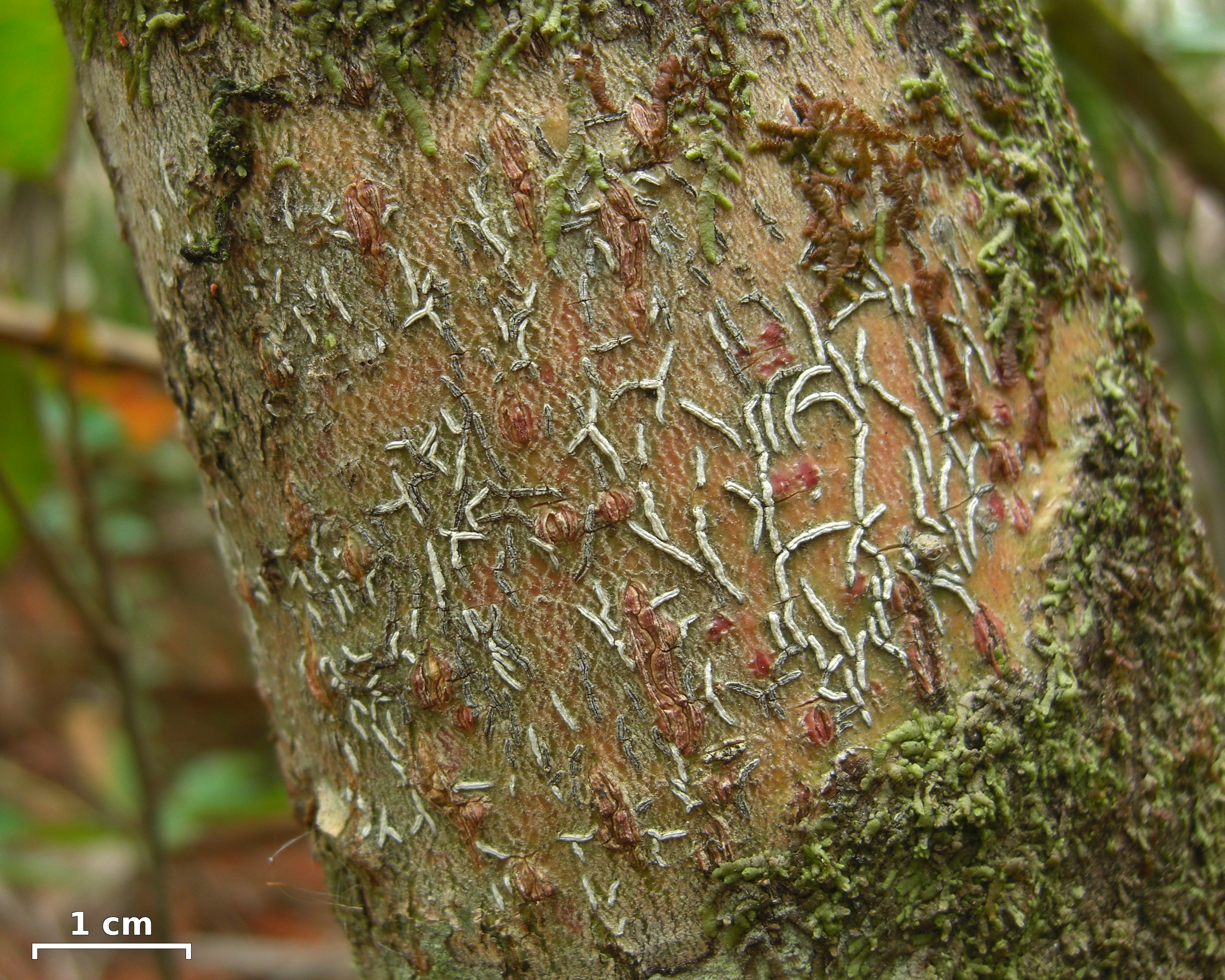

Conservation status
- Secure (NatureServe)

Scientific classification
- Kingdom: Fungi
- Division: Ascomycota
- Class: Lecanoromycetes
- Order: Graphidales
- Family: Graphidaceae
- Genus: Dyplolabia
- Species: D. afzelii

Binomial name
- Dyplolabia afzelii (Ach.) A.Massal. (1854)

Synonyms
- Graphis afzelii Ach. (1814); Opegrapha afzelii (Ach.) Fée (1874)

= Dyplolabia afzelii =

Species of lichen

Dyplolabia afzelii is a species of corticolous (bark-dwelling), script lichen in the family Graphidaceae. It has a pantropical distribution. The lichen has a thallus with colours ranging from yellow to pale olive buff, dark brownish tan, or grey, characterised by its smooth texture and considerable thickness. Its ascomata are lirelline (elongated with a slit-like opening), often raised from the thallus surface and concealed under a powdery white layer.

== Taxonomy ==
The lichen was first formally described by the Swedish lichenologist Erik Acharius in 1814, as a member of the genus Graphis. Abramo Bartolommeo Massalongo transferred it to the genus Dyplolabia in 1854.

== Description ==
The lichen species Dyplolabia afzelii is characterised by a thallus with a range of colours from yellow to pale olive buff, dark brownish tan, or grey. The texture of the thallus is smooth and it has a considerable thickness. Abramo Bartolommeo Massalongo transferred it to the genus Dyplolabia in 1854.

The ascomata (spore-producing structures) of Dyplolabia afzelii have a lirelline form, meaning they are elongated with a slit-like opening. These ascomata measure between 1 and 6 mm in length and 0.2 to 0.7 mm in width. They are mostly simple in form but can occasionally be branched or forked. These structures are raised from the surface of the thallus, displaying various shapes such as straight, curved, or flexuous. They are scattered across the thallus and are usually completely concealed under a thick powdery white layer of prunia, revealing a black colour only where this layer is worn away. The ascomata terminate in a blunt end, and their narrow, slit-like discs are not visible from the surface.

The exciple (the outer layer of tissue surrounding the ascomata) is intact at the base and carbonised (blackened) along the sides, converging at the top. It is enveloped by a thick thalline layer that extends to the apex. The epithecium, the topmost layer within the ascomata, is greenish-brown to dark brown and measures 14–28 μm in thickness.

The paraphyses, which are filamentous structures within the ascomata, are simple, long, thin, and septate (segmented), with thickened ends. The asci (spore-bearing cells) are cylindrical and typically contain eight spores each. The ascospores themselves are ellipsoidal in shape and consistently have three cross-septations, measuring 14–20 by 6–8 μm. They do not react to iodine staining. Chemically, this species is identified by the presence of lecanoric acid.

== Distribution ==
The lichen is found in Australia, Mexico, South America, the Caribbean, India, Thailand, and the Mid-Atlantic Coastal Plain of North Carolina in eastern North America.
