= Carbacanthographis halei =

Scientific classification
- Domain: Eukaryota
- Kingdom: Fungi
- Division: Ascomycota
- Class: Lecanoromycetes
- Order: Graphidales
- Family: Graphidaceae
- Genus: Carbacanthographis
- Species: C. halei

Binomial name
- Carbacanthographis halei Feuerstein & Lücking (2022)

Species of lichen

Carbacanthographis halei is a species of corticolous (bark-dwelling) lichen in the family Graphidaceae. Found in insular Malaysia, it was formally described as a new species in 2022 by Shirley Cunha Feuerstein and Robert Lücking. The type specimen was collected from a lowland oak-dipterocarp forest in Bako National Park (Sarawak). The specific epithet honours American lichenologist Mason Hale, who collected the type in 1965.

The lichen has an olive-yellow thallus with a distinct cortex and an indistinct prothallus. Its ascospores are hyaline, measuring 5–35 by 7–8 μm with between 9 and 13 transverse septa. Carbacanthographis halei contains stictic acid and norstictic acid, which are lichen products that can be detected using thin-layer chromatography.
