= Acanthothecis leucoxanthoides =

Conservation status
- Critically Endangered (IUCN 3.1)

Scientific classification
- Kingdom: Fungi
- Division: Ascomycota
- Class: Lecanoromycetes
- Order: Graphidales
- Family: Graphidaceae
- Genus: Acanthothecis
- Species: A. leucoxanthoides

Binomial name
- Acanthothecis leucoxanthoides Lendemer

Species of acanthothecis

Acanthothecis leucoxanthoides is a critically endangered species of Acanthothecis native to North America, found in the Coastal Plain of Georgia and North Carolina.

As of 2018, there are an estimated 25 mature specimens of Acanthothecis leucoxanthoides.

The species is found on the bark of hardwood trees, with the population dwindling due to logging and silviculture clearing.
