= Acanthothecis celata =

Scientific classification
- Kingdom: Fungi
- Division: Ascomycota
- Class: Lecanoromycetes
- Order: Graphidales
- Family: Graphidaceae
- Genus: Acanthothecis
- Species: A. celata

Binomial name
- Acanthothecis celata B.O.Sharma, Makhija & Khadilkar (2010)

Species of lichen-forming fungus

Acanthothecis celata is a species of corticolous (bark-dwelling) script lichen in the family Graphidaceae. It forms a thick, snow-white crust with fruiting bodies that are largely hidden within the thallus. The species is known only from lowland evergreen forest in Karnataka, India.

== Taxonomy ==
Acanthothecis celata was described as new to science in 2010 by Bharati Sharma, Urmila Makhija and Pradnya Khadilkar, based on material collected in the Indian state of Karnataka. The type specimen was gathered on 27 January 1980 along the Peercode–Hiriadka route at roughly 200 ft (about 60 m) elevation, and the holotype is preserved in the Ajrekar Mycological Herbarium (AMH).

In the original description it was compared most closely with Acanthothecis albescens, which has similarly sized ascospores but differs in producing stictic acid (A. celata has no detectable lichen substances). The species was also separated from superficially similar species such as A. mirabilis and A. sanguinoloba, which have small, transversely septate spores but develop more conspicuous fruiting bodies, grooved exciples, and an isohypocrelline pigment.

== Description ==
The lichen forms a snow-white, crust-like thallus that is thick, granular and mealy-looking, and finely cracked, with a thin bordering hypothallus. Its fruiting bodies (ascomata) are immersed and usually concealed by the thallus; they tend to become apparent only when the surface is moistened, when irregular outlines can be seen within the white crust. Individual ascomata are about 0.5–1.5 mm long and 0.2–0.3 mm wide, with a moderately thick thalline margin. The spore-bearing surface (disc) is hidden beneath dense white pruina, but when wet it shows through as reddish brown to almost blackish red.

Microscopically, the exciple is not carbonized and lacks striations. The hymenium is clear (not inspersed) and 125–145 μm tall, and it does not stain in iodine tests (I−, KI−); the hypothecium is distinct, light yellow, and about 10–12.5 μm thick. The paraphyses branch near their tips, the periphysoids are short with faint warting, and the asci contain 4–8 spores. The ascospores are hyaline, elongate and tapered at the ends, with 8–10 transverse septa, measuring 35–43 × 7–10 μm, and they are also iodine-negative. No lichen secondary metabolites were detected by thin-layer chromatography.

== Habitat and distribution ==
Acanthothecis celata has been reported from lowland evergreen forest in Karnataka, India. The known collections come from around 200 ft (about 60 m) elevation. As of its original publication, the species was known only from the type locality area (Peercode to Hiriadka), represented by the holotype collection and one additional specimen gathered in the same area in 1980.
