= Acanthothecis aurantiacodiscus =

Scientific classification
- Domain: Eukaryota
- Kingdom: Fungi
- Division: Ascomycota
- Class: Lecanoromycetes
- Order: Graphidales
- Family: Graphidaceae
- Genus: Acanthothecis
- Species: A. aurantiacodiscus

Binomial name
- Acanthothecis aurantiacodiscus Weerakoon, Lücking & Lumbsch (2014)

Species of lichen

Acanthothecis aurantiacodiscus is a species of corticolous lichen in the family Graphidaceae. Found in Sri Lanka, it was formally described as a new species in 2014 by lichenologists Gothamie Weerakoon, Robert Lücking, and Helge Thorsten Lumbsch. The type specimen was collected from the Kabaragala Tea Estate in Central Province at an altitude of 1,160 m (3,810 ft); here it was growing in semi-exposed, disturbed vegetation. It is only known to occur at the type locality. The specific epithet aurantiacodiscus refers to the orange-coloured disc of the ascomata. Acanthothecis aurantiacodiscus contains the secondary compound norstictic acid. It has relatively large muriform ascospores, measuring 45–50 by 12–15 μm. These last two features distinguish it from most other Acanthothecis species.
