= Redonographa galapagoensis =

Scientific classification
- Domain: Eukaryota
- Kingdom: Fungi
- Division: Ascomycota
- Class: Lecanoromycetes
- Order: Graphidales
- Family: Redonographaceae
- Genus: Redonographa
- Species: R. galapagoensis

Binomial name
- Redonographa galapagoensis Bungartz & Lücking (2013)

Species of lichen

Redonographa galapagoensis is a species of saxicolous (rock-dwelling), crustose lichen in the family Redonographaceae. Found in the Galápagos Islands, it was formally described as a new species in 2013 by lichenologists Frank Bungartz and Robert Lücking. The type specimen was collected by the first author from Santiago Island. Redonographa galapagoensis grows along the coast underneath wind- and rain-sheltered, shaded overhangs. Redonographa galapagoensis was previously reported as Carbacanthographis saxiseda, but it was found to represent an undescribed taxon. It appears to be endemic to the Galapagos Islands.

== Description ==
The thallus of Redonographa galapagoensis is areolate and whitish gray, becoming yellowish white in the herbarium, with a smooth, epruinose surface. The apothecia are prominent, rounded to shortly lirellate, and mostly unbranched. The periphysoids are verrucose, and the ascospores are narrow and somewhat muriform with thickened septa and lens-shaped to rounded lumina. The lichen produces norstictic acid, and the thallus turns K+ (yellow, then red), forming needle-shaped crystals under the microscope.

The species is recognized by its rather prominent, partially open ascomata, verrucose periphysoids, and narrow ascospores. Its verrucose periphysoids have a different appearance from the spinulose surface found in Carbacanthographis, suggesting that the two genera are not closely related and do not have shared synapomorphies.
