= Acanthothecis kalbii =

Scientific classification
- Kingdom: Fungi
- Division: Ascomycota
- Class: Lecanoromycetes
- Order: Graphidales
- Family: Graphidaceae
- Genus: Acanthothecis
- Species: A. kalbii

Binomial name
- Acanthothecis kalbii Dal-Forno & Eliasaro (2009)

Species of lichen-forming fungus

Acanthothecis kalbii is a species of script lichen in the family Graphidaceae. It was described as a new species in 2009 by Manuela Dal-Forno and Sionara Eliasaro. The type specimen was collected from Pontal do Sul in Pontal do Paraná, Brazil. The specific epithet honours German lichenologist Klaus Kalb.

== Description ==
The lichen has a smooth, off-white thallus that grows on bark. It has oblong lirellae, the same colour as the thallus, measuring 0.3–0.9 mm long by 0.15–0.25 mm wide. Its ascospores, which number eight per ascus, are ellipsoid with 3 to 5 transverse septa; they measure 9–15 μm long by 4–5 μm wide. Norstictic acid is present in the thallus.

== See also ==
- List of lichens of Brazil
