= Rainforest of Xishuangbanna =

Forest in Yunnan, China

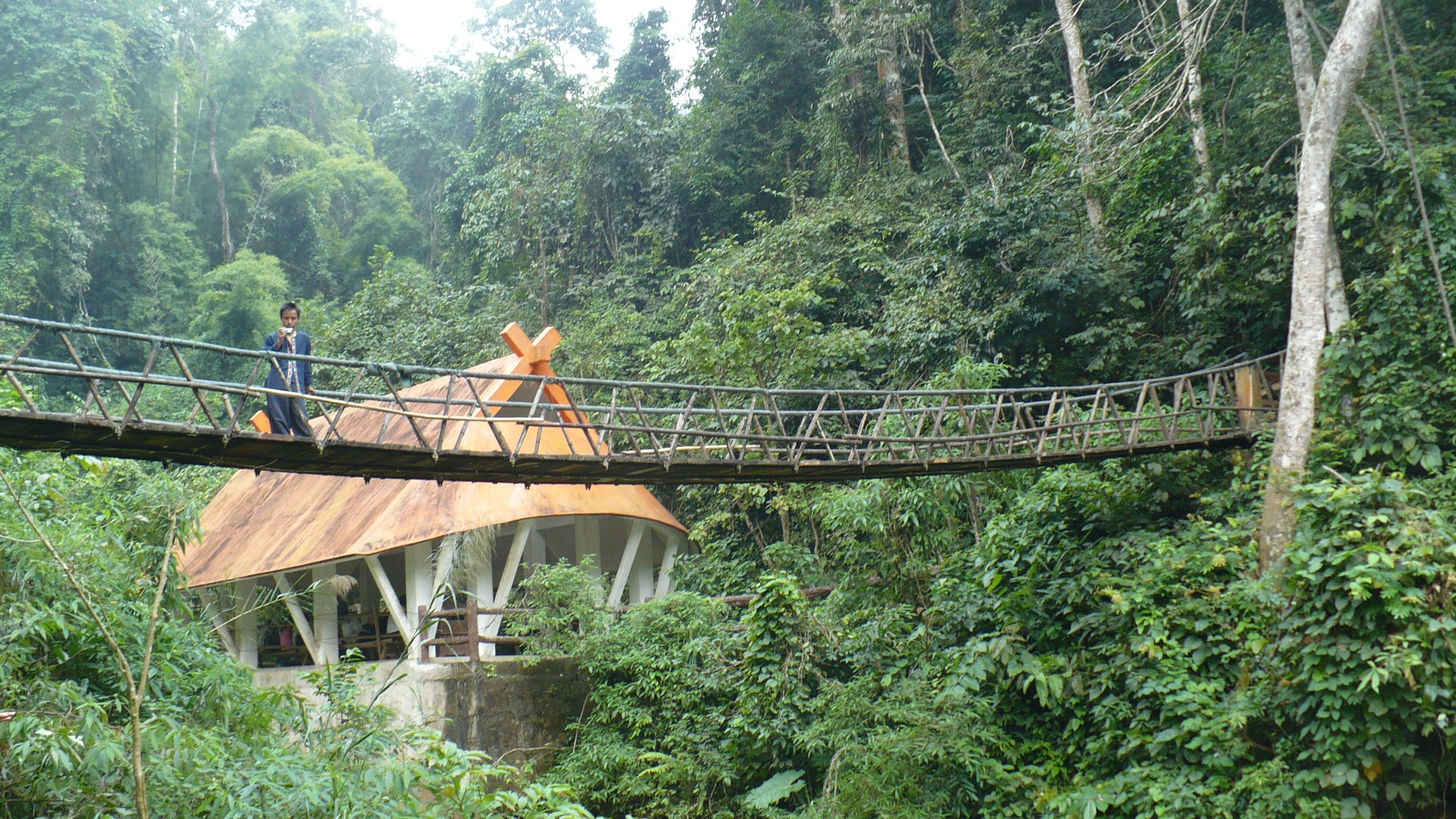

- Location within Yunnan
- Location: Yunnan Province, China
- Coordinates: 22.02710°N 100.8754°E
- Area: 19,223 km^{2} (7,422 sq mi)

The Rainforest of Xishuangbanna in the Yunnan Province of China is one of the largest forests in Asia at 19,223 km^{2} (7,422 sq mi).

In recent years the region has been opened up to use in a large scale and the primary forests, especially rainforests, have been severely destroyed.

== Biodiversity ==
Xishuangbanna is included in the Indo-Burma biodiversity hotspots and contains over 5,000 species of vascular plants, comprising 16% of China’s total plant diversity.

This rainforest entails also a very diverse fauna of birds, mammals, and reptiles, and amphibians, which represent 36%, 21%, and 14% of China’s biodiversity, respectively.

Among others, the area gives home to Asian elephants, Indo-Chinese tigers, and green peacocks.

== Vegetation types ==
The tropical rainforest of Xishuangbanna can be divided into two vegetation subtypes pertaining to tropical rainforest vegetation, the tropical seasonal rainforest and the tropical montane rainforest.
