= Carbacanthographis salazinica =

Scientific classification
- Kingdom: Fungi
- Division: Ascomycota
- Class: Lecanoromycetes
- Order: Graphidales
- Family: Graphidaceae
- Genus: Carbacanthographis
- Species: C. salazinica

Binomial name
- Carbacanthographis salazinica (A.W.Archer) A.W.Archer (2005)

Synonyms
- Graphina salazinica A.W.Archer (2001)

Species of lichen

Carbacanthographis salazinica is a species of script lichen in the family Graphidaceae. Found in Australia, it was described as a new species in 2001 by lichenologist Alan Archer. The type specimen was collected by Archer in Conglomerate State Forest (New South Wales). Here the lichen was found growing on the bark of a palm tree. Its thallus is thin and grayish-green, with conspicuous white lirellae measuring 1–4 mm long. The specific epithet refers to salazinic acid, the presence of which is a distinguishing characteristic of this species. The lichen also has trace amounts of other secondary chemicals, including consalazinic acid, norstictic acid, and protocetraric acid. In 2005 Archer transferred the taxon to genus Carbacanthographis.
