= Carbacanthographis coccospora =

Scientific classification
- Kingdom: Fungi
- Division: Ascomycota
- Class: Lecanoromycetes
- Order: Graphidales
- Family: Graphidaceae
- Genus: Carbacanthographis
- Species: C. coccospora

Binomial name
- Carbacanthographis coccospora (Aptroot) Aptroot & Lücking (2009)

Synonyms
- Graphina coccospora Aptroot (2002)

Species of lichen

Carbacanthographis coccospora is a species of saxicolous (rock-dwelling) crustose lichen in the family Graphidaceae. Found in Brazil, it was described as new to science in 2002.

== Taxonomy ==
Carbacanthographis coccospora was described by the Dutch lichenologist André Aptroot in 2002, from samples he collected in the Serra do Caraça, Minas Gerais, Brazil. He originally classified it in the genus Graphina. Diagnostic characteristics of the species are its unique globose to ellipsoid, 4–6 loculate ascospores and an exciple that is fully carbonised. Aptroot and Robert Lücking transferred the taxon to the genus Carbacanthographis in 2009.

== Description ==
The thallus of Carbacanthographis coccospora is crustose, metallic greyish in appearance, and can grow up to 5 cm in diameter. It has a thickness of up to 0.5 mm and is typically surrounded by a glossy hypothallus about 1 mm wide. The thallus contains sparse, Trentepohlia (alga)-like green algae.

Apothecia (fruiting bodies) are mostly immersed within the thallus, lirelline (elongated with a slit-like opening), simple, and range from 0.5 to 1.5 mm in length. The apothecial disc is black and slit-like, measuring 50–80 μm wide. The hymenium (fertile spore-bearing tissue) is clear, hyaline, and does not react to iodine (IKI-negative). The fully carbonised exciple encases the hymenium.

Asci are cylindrical, measuring approximately 75–110 by 9–13 μm, with contents that are dextrinoid red-brown when treated with iodine but lack an ocular chamber. Ascospores are arranged in a uniseriate manner, with eight spores per ascus, hyaline, IKI-negative, distoseptate with 4–6 rounded locules arranged in two rows, and measure (6–)9–12 by 7–10 μm. These spores do not have a gelatinous sheath, and no pycnidia have been observed.

Chemical spot tests on Carbacanthographis coccospora (K−, C−, UV−) reveal no detectable substances, indicating a lack of secondary metabolites commonly found in other lichens.

== Habitat and distribution ==
Carbacanthographis coccospora is found growing on damp siliceous rocks in mountainous regions alongside species such as Heterodermia speciosa. Although it typically grows on rocks, similar species within its family are often found on tree bark.
