= Acanthothecis salazinica =

Scientific classification
- Kingdom: Fungi
- Division: Ascomycota
- Class: Lecanoromycetes
- Order: Graphidales
- Family: Graphidaceae
- Genus: Acanthothecis
- Species: A. salazinica

Binomial name
- Acanthothecis salazinica van den Boom & Sipman (2013)

Species of lichen

Acanthothecis salazinica is a species of script lichen in the family Graphidaceae. Found in Panama, it was described as a new species in 2013 by Pieter van den Boom and Harrie J. Sipman. The type specimen was collected near Paraíso, Panamá Province, close to the botanical garden in the Summit Park. Here it was growing on the bark of a cultivated Parmentiera cereifera tree. The lichen contains the secondary chemical salazinic acid, for which it is named. Acanthothecis subclavulifera is quite similar in morphology, but it contains protocetraric acid rather than salazinic acid and it has a different ascospore structure.

Another lichen was named Acanthothecis salazinica in 2013, by Santosh Joshi and Jae-Seoun Hur. However, since the publication date was a few months after van den Boom and Sipman's publication, it is not a validly published name because it is a later homonym and thus illegitimate. It was published validly with a new name, Acanthothecis yokdonensis, in 2017.
