= Acanthothecis collateralis =

Scientific classification
- Kingdom: Fungi
- Division: Ascomycota
- Class: Lecanoromycetes
- Order: Graphidales
- Family: Graphidaceae
- Genus: Acanthothecis
- Species: A. collateralis

Binomial name
- Acanthothecis collateralis Makhija & Adaw. (2007)

Species of lichen

Acanthothecis collateralis is a rare endemic species of script lichen in the family Graphidaceae. Found in the Andaman Islands of India, it was formally described as a new species in 2007 by Urmila Makhija and Bharati Adawadkar. It is distinguished from other Acanthothecis species by its specific arrangement of ascomata and distinct chemical composition.

The lichen's thallus has a creamy, off-white colour with a smooth texture that is finely cracked. It is surrounded by a thin, light, and slightly darkened prothallus. The ascomata (spore-producing structures), are lirelline in form and range from 0.2 to 1.2 mm in length. They are usually simple and rarely branched, and found in groups of 2 to 5 lirellae that are arranged parallel to each other, with a whitish rim bordering each group. The disc of the ascomata is narrow and reddish-brown to black in colour with a pruinose surface. The exciple, a protective layer, is brown and non-striate, converging at the base and covered by a thalline margin up to the top. The hymenium, or spore-producing layer, is hyaline and measures between 84 and 100 μm in height and 117 to 126 μm in width. Ascospores are oblong, have 3 transverse septa, and measure 16 to 21 by 3 to 4 μm.

Acanthothecis collateralis contains norstictic acid and trace amounts of stictic acid in its thallus. The species is readily distinguished by its parallel arrangement of ascomata and colourless ascospores with four locules. Unlike the closely related Acanthothecis rosea, A. collateralis does not contain the pigment isohypocrelline and does not have rose-pink ascocarps.
