= Redonographa =

Scientific classification
- Kingdom: Fungi
- Division: Ascomycota
- Class: Lecanoromycetes
- Order: Graphidales
- Family: Redonographaceae; Lumbsch (2020)
- Genus: Redonographa; Lücking, Tehler & Lumbsch (2013)

Type species
- Redonographa chilensis (Zahlbr.) Lücking & Tehler (2013)

Species
- R. chilensis R. galapagoensis R. parvispora R. saxiseda R. saxorum

Genus of lichens

Redonographa is a genus of lichen-forming fungi in the monogeneric family Redonographaceae. It has five species.

== Taxonomy ==
In 2013, lichenologists Robert Lücking, Anders Tehler, and Helge Thorsten Lumbsch proposed the new subfamily Redonographoideae to contain a lineage of lichen-forming fungi distinct from the Graphidaceae subfamilies Fissurinoideae and Graphidoideae. They introduced the genus Redonographa with Redonographa chilensis assigned its type species. Four species were initially included in the genus; a fifth was added in 2020. The genus is named in honour of Jorge Redón Figueroa (botany professor at Viña del Mar University and a professor emeritus at both the University of Chile (Faculty of Sciences) and the University of Valparaíso (Institute of Oceanology) for his significant contributions to Chilean lichenology.

In 2020, Lumbsch proposed the family Redonographaceae, with the authority "(Lücking, Tehler & Lumbsch) Lumbsch, stat nov.". In botanical taxonomy, "stat. nov." is an abbreviation for the Latin term "status novus," ("new status"), and is used to indicate that an existing taxon (in this case, the subfamily Redonographoideae) has been reclassified or reassigned to a different rank or status within the taxonomic hierarchy.

== Description ==
The genus Redonographa is distinct from Carbacanthographis due to its predominantly saxicolous growth habit, meaning it grows on rocks, and its predominantly smooth periphysoids, which are hair-like extensions found in the lirellae. The thallus, or outer layer of the lichen body, is relatively thick and varies in appearance from continuous to areolate. It may be ecorticate, meaning it lacks a cortex, or feature a compacted pseudocortex.

The lirellae, or fruiting structures, of Redonographa lichens can be erumpent to prominent and display a variety of forms, from unbranched to stellate (star-like) branching or even appearing in pseudostromatic clusters. These lirellae are surrounded by a basal to almost complete thalline margin. As they mature, their excipulum, or outer covering, becomes fully carbonized, arching over the hymenium and featuring short, smooth or apically warty periphysoids above it. The hymenium of these lichens is clear.

Each ascus, or spore-producing sac, in Redonographa lichens contains eight ascospores. These spores are ellipsoid to oblong in shape and have 3–5 transverse septa or are somewhat muriform with 3–5 transverse and 0–2 longitudinal septa per segment. The spores have thickened septa and lens-shaped to rounded lumina, and they are transparent. These ascospores exhibit a negative iodine (Lugol) reaction. In terms of secondary chemistry, Redonographa lichens produce norstictic acid.

== Species ==
Central and northern Chile appears to be the centre of diversity for Redonographa.

- Redonographa chilensis (Zahlbr.) Lücking & Tehler (2013) – Chile
- Redonographa galapagoensis Bungartz & Lücking (2013) – Galapagos Islands
- Redonographa parvispora R.Miranda, Barcenas-Peña & Lücking (2020) – Mexico
- Redonographa saxiseda (Zahlbr.) Lücking & Tehler (2013) – Chile
- Redonographa saxorum (Egea & Torrente) Lücking & Tehler (2013) – California and Baja California; Galapagos Islands
