= La Esmeralda, Venezuela =

La Esmeralda
- Location within Venezuela
- Coordinates: 3°10′26″N 65°32′48″W
- Country: Venezuela
- State: Amazonas State
- Municipality: Alto Orinoco Municipality
- Founded: 1758; 268 years ago
- Elevation: 225 m (738 ft)

Population (2013)
  - Total: 20 030
- Time zone: UTC−4 (VET)
- Climate: Af

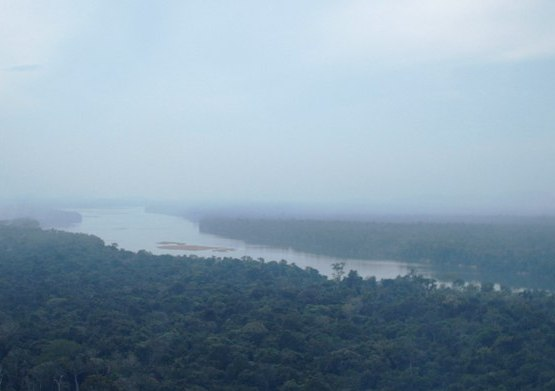
Orinoco river crossing La Esmeralda

La Esmeralda (Ye'kuana: Medadanña or Kadawanadunña) is a small settlement in and the capital of Alto Orinoco Municipality in Venezuela’s Amazonas State. The name means “the emerald”. It is located on the shore of the Orinoco river, only 9 miles from the Casiquiare canal bifurcation that links it to the Amazon River.

The settlement contains about a hundred homes, a school, an airfield and a military outpost.

== Geography ==
It is located on the shore of the Orinoco river, only 9 miles from the Casiquiare canal bifurcation that links it to the Amazon River.

=== Climate ===
La Esmeralda has a tropical rainforest climate (Af) with heavy to very heavy rainfall year-round.

Climate data for La Esmeralda
Month	Jan	Feb	Mar	Apr	May	Jun	Jul	Aug	Sep	Oct	Nov	Dec	Year
Mean daily maximum °C (°F)	32.0 (89.6)	32.4 (90.3)	32.4 (90.3)	31.4 (88.5)	30.4 (86.7)	29.9 (85.8)	30.0 (86.0)	30.7 (87.3)	31.6 (88.9)	31.6 (88.9)	32.0 (89.6)	31.8 (89.2)	31.4 (88.4)
Daily mean °C (°F)	27.1 (80.8)	27.3 (81.1)	27.5 (81.5)	27.1 (80.8)	26.5 (79.7)	26.2 (79.2)	26.1 (79.0)	26.5 (79.7)	27.0 (80.6)	27.0 (80.6)	27.4 (81.3)	27.1 (80.8)	26.9 (80.4)
Mean daily minimum °C (°F)	22.3 (72.1)	22.3 (72.1)	22.6 (72.7)	22.8 (73.0)	22.7 (72.9)	22.6 (72.7)	22.2 (72.0)	22.3 (72.1)	22.4 (72.3)	22.5 (72.5)	22.8 (73.0)	22.4 (72.3)	22.5 (72.5)
Average rainfall mm (inches)	109 (4.3)	120 (4.7)	163 (6.4)	296 (11.7)	356 (14.0)	379 (14.9)	351 (13.8)	298 (11.7)	194 (7.6)	205 (8.1)	173 (6.8)	125 (4.9)	2,769 (108.9)
