= Carbacanthographis =

Scientific classification
- Kingdom: Fungi
- Division: Ascomycota
- Class: Lecanoromycetes
- Order: Graphidales
- Family: Graphidaceae
- Genus: Carbacanthographis; Staiger & Kalb (2002)

Type species
- Carbacanthographis chionophora (Redinger) Staiger & Kalb (2002)

Genus of lichens

Carbacanthographis is a genus of corticolous (bark-dwelling) lichens in the family Graphidaceae. The genus was circumscribed by the German lichenologists Bettina Staiger and Klaus Kalb in 2002. An updated worldwide key to the genus was published in 2022 that added 17 new species. This revision allowed for further identification of undescribed species from other collections, and subsequently, 14 species were added in 2023 from the Amazonian lowland forests of Brazil and the Guianas.

== Description ==
Genus Carbacanthographis bears a strong resemblance to the genera Allographa and Graphis, with which it shares several characteristics, such as Trentepohlia-like photobionts, a typically carbonised (blackened) lirelliform excipulum, and colourless, transversely septate or muriform ascospores.

One of the main distinguishing features of Carbacanthographis is its unique apical structure of the excipulum. Unlike in Allographa and Graphis, where the excipulum's two lips close and the hamathecium extends into the fissure, in Carbacanthographis, the excipulum extends above the hamathecium, leaving an open fissure. This fissure's walls are covered at the tips by warty periphysoids, which are challenging to observe and rarely seen. Additionally, the excipulum may have somewhat radiating and apically emergent, smooth hyphae.

The growth pattern of the carbonised excipulum in Carbacanthographis results in less evident striate lirellae compared to many species of Graphis and Allographa. Clearly striate lirellae in Carbacanthographis are typically visible only when the excipulum is abraded, as seen in species like C. latispora.

The ascospores in Carbacanthographis also show notable differences. While in Allographa and Graphis, the spore lumina become rounded to lentiform with a strong I+ blue-violet reaction due to endospore deposition, in Carbacanthographis, some species have rounded to lentiform lumina without a positive I-reaction. In other species, there is little or no endospore formation, and the septa remain thin, with ascospores that may or may not exhibit a positive I-reaction.

The hamathecium's inspersion in Carbacanthographis consists of minute droplets approximately 0.5–1 μm wide, in contrast to the larger, unevenly sized oil-like droplets found in Graphis and Allographa. This difference in inspersion further aids in distinguishing Carbacanthographis from its close relatives.

== Species ==
As of May 2024, Species Fungorum (in the Catalogue of Life) accept 43 species in Carbacanthographis.

- C. acanthoamicta Feuerstein & Lücking (2022) – Papua New Guinea
- C. acanthoparaphysata Feuerstein & Lücking (2022) – Papua New Guinea
- C. aggregata Feuerstein & Lücking (2022) – Peninsular Malaysia
- C. albolirellata B.O.Sharma & Khadilkar (2011) – Tamil Nadu
- C. alloafzelii (A.W.Archer) A.W.Archer (2007) – South Solomons
- C. amazonica Feuerstein & Lücking (2022) – French Guiana
- C. amicta (Nyl.) Staiger & Kalb (2002)
- C. aptrootii Feuerstein & Lücking (2022) – Yunnan, China
- C. brasiliensis Feuerstein & Lücking (2022) – São Paulo, Brazil
- C. bulbosa Aptroot & M.Cáceres (2023) – Brazil
- C. candidata (Nyl.) Staiger & Kalb (2002)
- C. chionophora (Redinger) Staiger & Kalb (2002)
- C. clandestinospora Aptroot & M.Cáceres (2023) – Brazil
- C. cleitops (Fée) Lücking (2009)
- C. coccospora (Aptroot) Aptroot & Lücking (2009)
- C. crassa (Müll.Arg.) Staiger & Kalb (2002)
- C. cristata Aptroot & M.Cáceres (2023) – Brazil
- C. denudata Sipman (2023) – Guyana
- C. garoana (Nagarkar & Patw.) Pushpi Singh & Kr.P.Singh (2020)
- C. granulosa Sipman (2023) – Guyana
- C. halei Feuerstein & Lücking (2022) – Sarawak
- C. hertelii Kalb & Staiger (2004) – Australia
- C. hillii (A.W.Archer) A.W.Archer (2007)
- C. indica B.O.Sharma & Khadilkar (2011) – Meghalaya
- C. induta (Müll.Arg.) Lücking (2009)
- C. inspersa Staiger (2002) – Brazil
- C. inspersomarcescens Aptroot & M.Cáceres (2023) – Brazil
- C. iriomotensis (M.Nakan.) M.Nakan. & Kashiw. (2003)
- C. isidiata Sipman (2023) – Guyana
- C. latispora Feuerstein & Lücking (2022) – Venezuela
- C. latisporoides Sipman (2023) – Guyana
- C. lucidocleitops Sipman (2023) – Guyana
- C. megalospora Feuerstein & Lücking (2022) – Espírito Santo
- C. minutissima Sipman (2023) – Guyana
- C. multiseptata Feuerstein & Lücking (2022) – Venezuela
- C. multiseptatoides Sipman (2023) – Guyana
- C. muriformis E.A.Tripp & Lendemer (2010) – Florida, USA
- C. nematoides (Leight.) Feuerstein & Lücking (2022)
- C. nigra Sipman (2023) – Guyana
- C. nitida Aptroot & M.Cáceres (2023) – Brazil
- C. novoguineensis Feuerstein & Lücking (2022) – Papua New Guinea
- C. protocristata Sipman (2023) – Guyana
- C. pseudorustica Feuerstein & Lücking (2022) – Sarawak
- C. salazinica (A.W.Archer) A.W.Archer (2005) – Australia
- C. salazinicoides Feuerstein & Lücking (2022) – Papua New Guinea
- C. sipmaniana Feuerstein & Lücking (2022) – Sabah
- C. sorediata B.O.Sharma, Makhija & Khadilkar (2010) – Tamil Nadu
- C. spongiosa Feuerstein & Lücking (2022) – Sergipe
- C. stictica Staiger & Kalb (2002) – Amazonas
- C. subalbotecta Staiger & Kalb (2002) – Brazil
- C. subchionophora Feuerstein & Lücking (2022) – Papua New Guinea
- C. submultiseptata Lücking, N.Marín & B.Moncada (2023) – Colombia
- C. tetrinspersa Aptroot (2022) – Brazil
- C. triphoroides (M.Wirth & Hale) Lücking (2009)
- C. uniseptata Kalb & Aptroot (2018) – Australia
- C. violaceospora Kukwa & Flakus (2013) – Bolivia

Former species;

- C. chilensis (Zahlbr.) Lücking (2013) = Redonographa chilensis, Redonographaceae
- C. marcescens (Fée) Staiger & Kalb (2002) = Graphina marcescens, Graphidaceae
- C. saxiseda (Zahlbr.) Bungartz (2010) = Redonographa saxiseda, Redonographaceae
- C. saxorum (Egea & Torrente) Lücking & Bungartz (2010) = Redonographa saxorum, Redonographaceae
