= Alto Orinoco Municipality =

Alto Orinoco Municipality Municipio Alto Orinoco
- Municipality
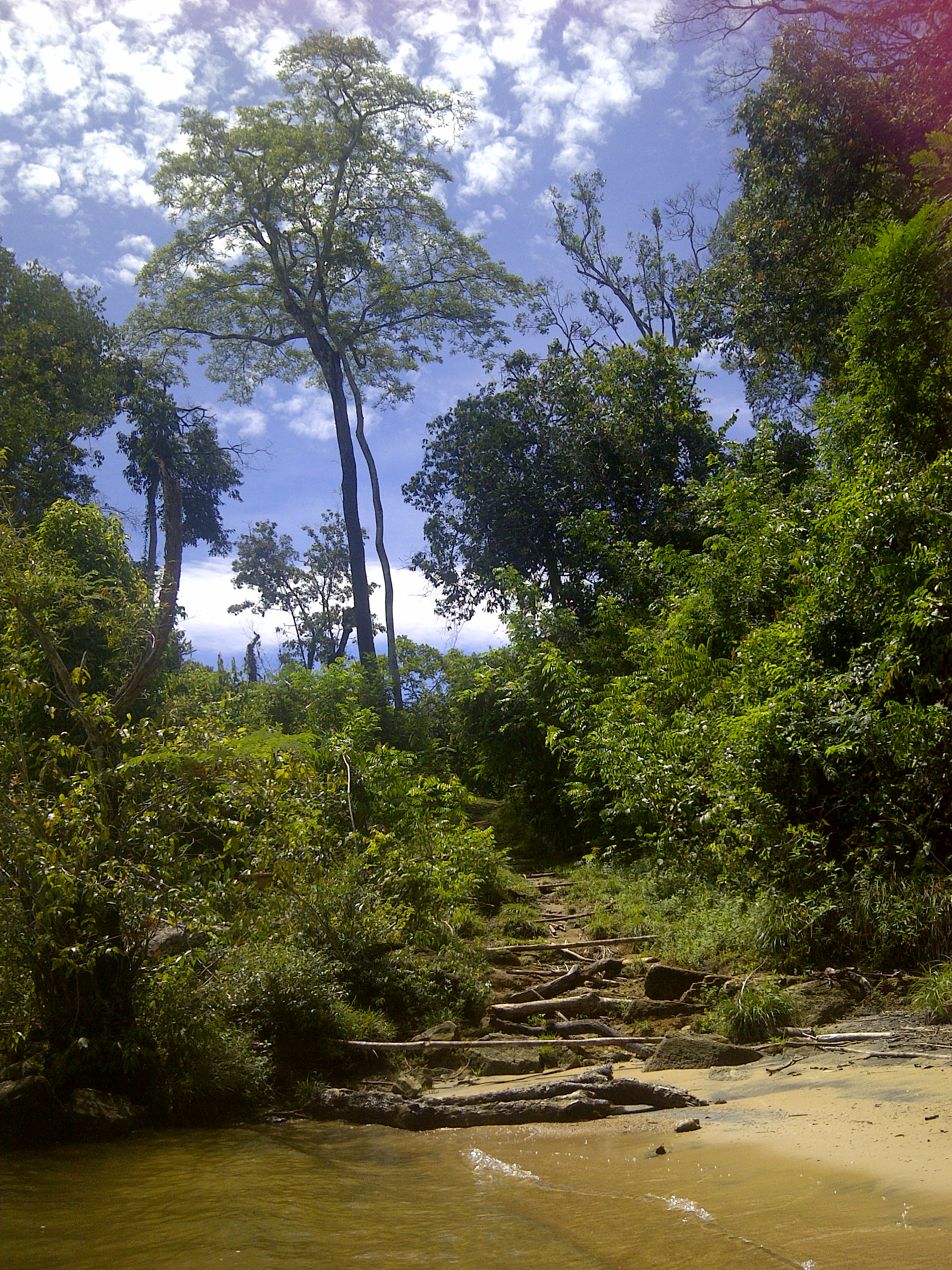

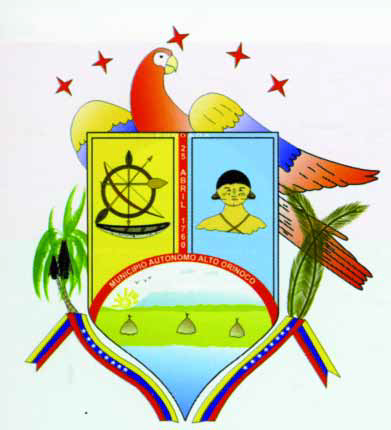
- Flag Coat of arms

- Location in Amazonas

- Location in Venezuela
- Coordinates: 2°56′38″N 64°41′36″W
- Country: Venezuela
- State: Amazonas
- Municipal seat: La Esmeralda

Government
  - Mayor: Jaime Turon (AD)

Area
  - Total: 47,508.3 km^{2} (18,343.1 sq mi)

Population (2011 census)
  - Total: 12,687
  - Density: 0.26705/km^{2} (0.69165/sq mi)
- Time zone: UTC−4 (VET)
- Area code(s): 0248

Alto Orinoco Municipality (Spanish: Municipio Alto Orinoco) is one of the seven municipalities (municipios) that make up the southern Venezuelan state of Amazonas and, according to the 2011 census by the National Institute of Statistics of Venezuela, the municipality has a population of 12,687. The shire town of Alto Orinoco is La Esmeralda.

== History ==
After the dissolution of the Spanish Commission of Territorial Limits by order of the Crown in 1760, Iturriaga and Solano returned to Spain and presented to the Court a series of proposals to ensure Spanish control over their possessions of Orinoco and Río Negro. Out of these proposals came the decision to create separate commands. On March 17, 1767, Diez de la Fuente arrived in Esmeralda accompanied by 60 Spaniards and the caciques Wadena and Wasaha, who led a group of 3,000 natives. With this, the redevelopment of Esmeralda commenced.

The municipality is recognized as a territorial division by the government of Antonio Guzmán Blanco on December 10, 1880, of what is now the Amazonas State.

== Demographics ==
The Alto Orinoco Municipality, according to a 2007 population estimate by the National Institute of Statistics of Venezuela, has a population of 17,797 (up from 15,281 in 2000). This amounts to 12.5% of the state's population. The municipality's population density is 0.3 inhabitants per square kilometre (0.78/sq mi).

== Government ==
The mayor of the Alto Orinoco Municipality is Jaime Turon, re-elected on October 31, 2004, with 40% of the vote. The municipality is divided into five parishes: Capital Alto Orinoco, Huachamacare, Marawaka, Mavaca, and Sierra Parima. Prior to December 18, 1997, Alto Orinoco Municipality had only one parish.
