= Anomomorpha =

Scientific classification
- Domain: Eukaryota
- Kingdom: Fungi
- Division: Ascomycota
- Class: Lecanoromycetes
- Order: Graphidales
- Family: Graphidaceae
- Genus: Anomomorpha; Nyl. ex Hue (1891)

Type species
- Anomomorpha turbulenta (Nyl.) Nyl. (1891)

Species
- A. aggregans A. elegans A. lecanorina A. roseola A. sordida A. subtorquens A. tuberculata A. turbulenta

Genus of fungi

Anomomorpha is a genus of lichens in the family Graphidaceae. The genus, described in 1891, has a pantropical distribution. These lichens form pale grey to dull olive crusts on tree bark that often develop low wart-like bumps covered with powdery particles, and produce narrow, usually wavy slit-like fruiting bodies. They are found in tropical rainforests worldwide, growing on shaded to semi-exposed bark in primary or lightly disturbed evergreen forests, with some species being narrowly restricted to specific mountain cloud forests.

== Description ==
Anomomorpha produces a pale grey- to dull olive crust (thallus) that lacks a protective cortex and often develops low wart-like outgrowths covered with powdery schizidia. Its fruit bodies are narrow, usually sinuous lirellae whose lips may be faintly striate; the surrounding excipulum remains pale rather than carbonised. The hymenium is characteristically inspersed with oily droplets, and iodine staining tests turn it dark violet (I+). Each ascus releases eight minute, hyaline ascospores that are 1- to 3-septate, react I+ blue, and rarely exceed 10 μm in length. Most species contain the red-brown depsidone compound norstictic acid along with related secondary metabolites.

Chemical and morphological diversity within the genus is wider than once thought. For example, the Andean species A. lecanorina, described in 2011, departs from the usual pattern by producing constictic acid, showing a smooth thallus without schizidia and forming slightly larger, muriform spores—yet it retains the inspersed hymenium and I+ reaction that diagnose the genus.

== Ecology ==
Anomomorpha has a pantropical distribution, with records from lowland Amazonia to African, Asian and Australasian rainforests. All known species are corticolous, occupying shaded to semi-exposed bark in primary or only lightly disturbed evergreen forests; the abundance of warted schizidia suggests efficient vegetative spread in humid canopies.

Field data indicate that some members are narrowly endemic: A. lecanorina occurs only in montane cloud forest between 2,000 and 2,500 m in southern Ecuador, where it grows on canopy branches of broad-leaved trees. Such restricted, habitat-specialist distributions make the genus potentially useful as an indicator of undisturbed, mature forest stands.

== Species ==
As of June 2025, Species Fungorum (in the Catalogue of Life) accepts eight species of Anomomorpha:

- Anomomorpha aggregans (Nyl.) Staiger (2002)
- Anomomorpha elegans B.O.Sharma, Makhija & Khadilkar (2010)
- Anomomorpha lecanorina Sipman (2011)
- Anomomorpha roseola A.W.Archer & Elix (2007)
- Anomomorpha sordida Staiger (2002)
- Anomomorpha subtorquens (Nyl.) Staiger (2002)
- Anomomorpha tuberculata Lücking, L.Umaña & Will-Wolf (2011)
- Anomomorpha turbulenta (Nyl.) Nyl. (1891)
