= Malmidea albomarginata =

Scientific classification
- Kingdom: Fungi
- Division: Ascomycota
- Class: Lecanoromycetes
- Order: Lecanorales
- Family: Malmideaceae
- Genus: Malmidea
- Species: M. albomarginata

Binomial name
- Malmidea albomarginata Kalb & J.E.Hern.(2021)
- Holotype site: Cerro El Volcán, Venezuela

Species of lichen

Malmidea albomarginata is a species of corticolous (bark-dwelling), crustose lichen in the family Malmideaceae. It is found in Venezuela.

== Taxonomy ==
The lichen was formally described as a new species in 2021 by the lichenologists Klaus Kalb and Jesús Maldonado. The type specimen was collected by the authors from the Cerro El Volcán (Miranda) at an elevation of 1,460 m (4,790 ft); there it was found growing in a disturbed tropical mountain rainforest. The species epithet albomarginata alludes to the distinctive white margins that characterise its apothecia.

== Description ==
Malmidea albomarginata is a crustose lichen with a continuous thallus measuring 200–300 μm in thickness. The thallus surface is initially verrucose, with verrucae being scarce and unevenly distributed, each measuring 0.1–0.3 mm in height and 0.15–0.3 mm in width. Over time, the thallus becomes dull and transforms from grey or greenish-grey to a coralloid granular texture as it ages. This species lacks soralia and isidia. The medulla of both the verrucae and thallus is white to faintly yellow, reacting K+ (orange to reddish) when tested with potassium hydroxide, but without a reaction to the P spot test. The photobiont is chlorococcoid, with cells around 6–8 μm in diameter.

Apothecia in Malmidea albomarginata are sessile and rounded, ranging from 0.8–1.8 mm in diameter and 0.2–0.3 mm in height. The apothecial discs are flat to slightly convex, with colours varying from ochre to light greyish-brown. The excipulum is of the granifera type, entire, thin, and white. The ectal excipulum is hyaline, while the medullary excipulum is whitish to slightly yellowish, filled with opaque, greyish to yellowish granules that partially dissolve in KOH, producing a K+ (orange-red) efflux. The subhymenium is about 25 μm high and hyaline to light brown, while the centrally located hypothecium is 100–150 μm high, narrowing towards the margin and dark brown, showing no reaction to K tests. The epihymenium is indistinct, and the hymenium measures 75–90 μm in height, being hyaline. Asci are sized 65–80 μm by 12–18 μm, containing 6–8 non-septate, halonate, ellipsoid ascospores per ascus, measuring (10–)14 by 6–9 μm, with a halo of 1.5–2 μm.

Chemically, Malmidea albomarginata primarily contains atranorin, alongside several unidentified xantholepinones. It is distinguished from similar species like Malmidea attenboroughii by differences in apothecia size and the presence of atranorin. In comparison with Malmidea aurigera and Malmidea piperina, Malmidea albomarginata features larger apothecia, a paler apothecial disc, and warts that become coralloid granular.
