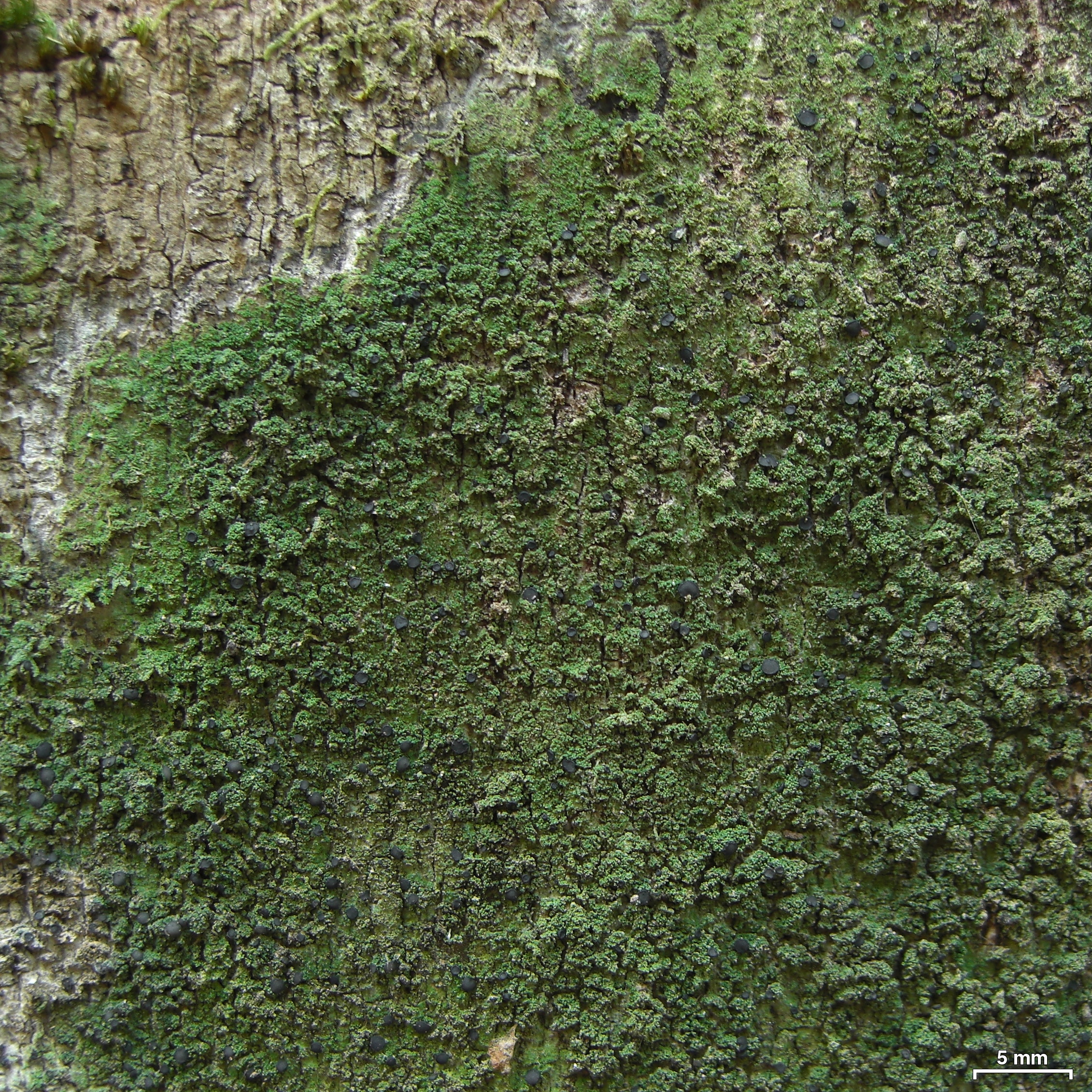
- Malmidea furfurosa

Scientific classification
- Kingdom: Fungi
- Division: Ascomycota
- Class: Lecanoromycetes
- Order: Lecanorales
- Family: Malmideaceae
- Genus: Malmidea; Kalb, Rivas Plata & Lumbsch (2011)

Type species
- Malmidea piperis (Spreng.) Kalb, Rivas Plata & Lumbsch (2011)

Species
- See text

= Malmidea =

Genus of lichen-forming fungi

Malmidea is a genus of crustose lichens and the type genus of the family Malmideaceae. It was established in 2011 to contain a phylogenetically distinct group of species formerly placed in the genus Malcolmiella. The crust-like thallus of Malmidea lichens has a surface that varies from smooth to rough, featuring textures such as verrucose (wart-like), granulose (grainy), or pustulate (pimpled). These textures are often formed by goniocysts, which are spherical clusters of green algal cells from the family Chlorococcaceae, encased in fungal hyphae. Malmidea comprises nearly 70 mostly tropical species that grow on bark, although a few grow on leaves.

== Taxonomy ==
Both the family Malmideaceae and the genus Malmidea were created in 2011 to accommodate a group of species, formerly placed in genus Malcolmiella (family Ectolechiaceae), that molecular phylogenetics showed to be a distinct lineage and worthy of recognition at the family level. Klaus Kalb, Eimy Rivas Plata, and H. Thorsten Lumbsch originally placed 37 species in the genus – 5 new species and 32 new combinations. Many additional species have since been transferred to Malmidea from other genera, or described as new.

The generic name Malmidea honours Swedish botanist Gustaf Oskar Andersson Malme (1864–1937).

== Description ==
The thallus of Malmidea lichens grow on bark (corticolous) or on leaves (foliicolous). The form of the thallus is like a crust, ranging in surface texture from smooth to verrucose (studded with wartlike protuberances), granulose (covered with small grains) or pustulate (covered with pustules). These variously shaped surface bumps are often formed by goniocysts (spherical aggregations of photobiont cells surrounded by short-celled hyphae) that develop on a whitish fibrous underlying prothallus. The photobiont partner of Malmidea is a member of Chlorococcaceae, a family of green algae.

Malmidea apothecia are sessile, with a more or less rounded shape, and have a distinct margin. They have a biatorine form, meaning that they have only a pale, not blackened proper margin and always lack a margin on the thallus. The excipulum is usually paraplectenchymatous (a cell arrangement where the hyphae are oriented in all directions), made of radiating hyphae, partly with medullary layer or chambers composed of loosely arranged, periclinal hyphae (i.e. lined up in parallel adjacent to another layer of hyphae) with constricted septa and incrusted with hydrophobic granules. The hypothecium (the layer of hyphal tissue immediately beneath the hymenium) is prosoplectenchymatous (a cell arrangement where the hyphae are all oriented in one direction), and translucent to dark brown. Asci are club-shaped, lacking a distinct tubular structure in the tholus that is characteristic of family Ectolechiaceae. Ascospores usually number four to eight per ascus, and are colourless, ellipsoid, non-septate, and usually filled with oblong crystals. The spore walls are evenly thickened or thickened at the ends, and halonate (having a transparent outer layer). Conidia are threadlike and curved, measuring 17–25 by 0.8 μm. Pycnidia are rare in this genus; they occur in the thallus warts and are whitish and spherical, about 0.1 mm in diameter.

== Chemistry ==
Secondary chemicals associated with Malmidea include atranorin, sometimes norsolorinic acid (as in M. piperis), anthraquinones, biphenyls and many unknown xantholepinones.

== Species ==
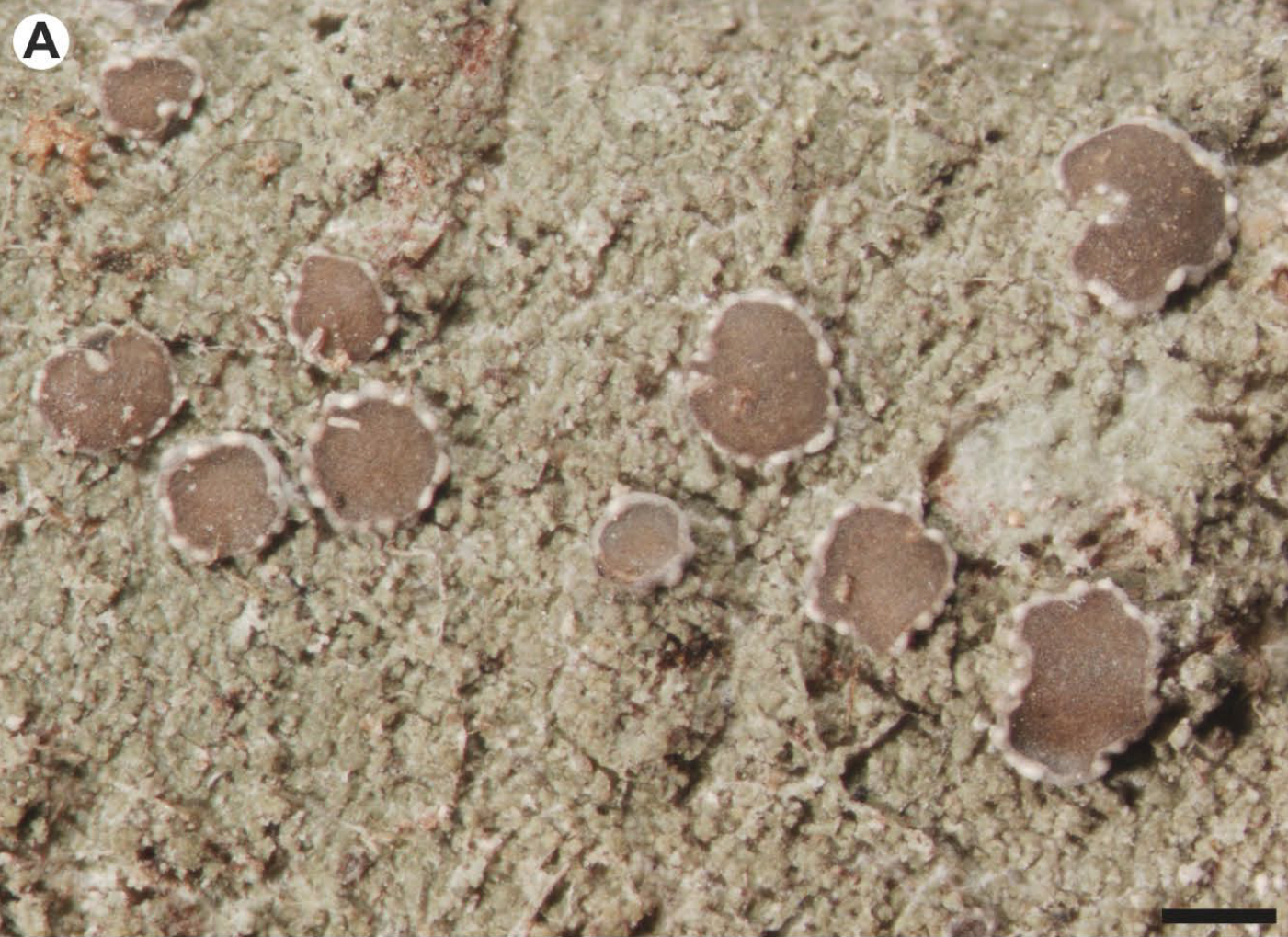
Malmidea attenboroughii (holotype shown) is known from a single locality in Bolivia.

As of December 2023, Species Fungorum (in the Catalogue of Life) accept 68 species of Malmidea. Malmidea mostly occurs in tropical rainforests.

- Malmidea albomarginata Kalb & J.Hern. (2021) – Venezuela
- Malmidea allobakeri Kalb & M.Cáceres (2021) – Brazil
- Malmidea allopapillosa Kalb (2021) – Venezuela
- Malmidea amazonica (Redinger) Kalb, Rivas Plata & Lumbsch (2011)
- Malmidea atlantica (M.Cáceres & Lücking) M.Cáceres & Kalb (2011)
- Malmidea atlanticoides Kalb & M.Cáceres (2021) – Brazil
- Malmidea attenboroughii Kukwa & B.Guzow-Krzem. (2019) – Bolivia
- Malmidea aurigera (Fée) Kalb, Rivas Plata & Lumbsch (2011)
- Malmidea bacidinoides (Lücking) Kalb & Lücking (2011)
- Malmidea badimioides (M.Cáceres & Lücking) M.Cáceres & Kalb (2011)
- Malmidea bakeri (Vain.) Kalb, Rivas Plata & Lumbsch (2011) – Asia
- Malmidea ceylanica (Zahlbr.) Kalb, Rivas Plata & Lumbsch (2011)
- Malmidea chrysostigma (Vain.) Kalb, Rivas Plata & Lumbsch (2011) – Asia
- Malmidea cineracea Breuss & Lücking (2015) – Nicaragua
- Malmidea cinereonigrella (Vain.) Kalb (2011)
- Malmidea coralliformis Kalb (2011) – Thailand
- Malmidea corallophora Aptroot & Schumm (2012) – Philippines
- Malmidea demutans (Nyl.) Lücking (2021) – Colombia
- Malmidea densisidiata Aptroot & Oliveira Junior (2022) – Brazil
- Malmidea duplomarginata (Papong & Kalb) Kalb & Papong (2011)
- Malmidea eeuuae Kalb (2011) – Thailand
- Malmidea fellhaneroides (Lücking) Kalb & Lücking (2011)
- Malmidea fenicis (Vain.) Kalb, Rivas Plata & Lumbsch (2011)
- Malmidea flavimarginata Lücking, N.Marín & Álvaro (2023) – Colombia
- Malmidea flavopustulosa (M.Cáceres & Lücking) M.Cáceres & Kalb (2011)
- Malmidea floridensis (Nyl.) M.Cáceres, Aptroot & Lücking (2017) –
- Malmidea fulva (Malme) Kalb & van den Boom (2014)
- Malmidea furfurosa (Tuck. ex Nyl.) Kalb & Lücking (2011)
- Malmidea fuscella (Müll. Arg.) Kalb & Lücking (2011)
- Malmidea granifera (Ach.) Kalb, Rivas Plata & Lumbsch (2011)
- Malmidea gyalectoides (Vain.) Kalb & Lücking (2011)
- Malmidea gymnopiperis Kalb (2011)
- Malmidea hechicerae Kalb (2021) – Venezuela
- Malmidea hernandeziana Kalb (2021) – Venezuela
- Malmidea hypomelaena (Nyl.) Kalb & Lücking (2011)
- Malmidea incrassata Kalb (2012) – Brazil
- Malmidea indica (D.D.Awasthi & M.R.Agarwal) Hafellner & T. Sprib. (2011)
- Malmidea inflata Kalb (2011) – Thailand
- Malmidea isidiifera Kalb (2021) – Brazil; Venezuela
- Malmidea isidiopiperina Lücking, B. Moncada & Álvaro (2023) – Colombia
- Malmidea leptoloma (Müll.Arg.) Kalb & Lücking (2011)
- Malmidea leucogranifera M.Cáceres & Lücking (2012)
- Malmidea leucopiperis Kalb (2021) – Brazil; Venezuela
- Malmidea papillitrailiana Lücking, B.Moncada & Álvaro (2023) – Colombia
- Malmidea nigra Aptroot & Oliveira Junior (2022) – Brazil
- Malmidea nigromarginata (Malme) Lücking & Breuss (2015) – Nicaragua
- Malmidea pallidoatlantica M. Cáceres, V.M.Santos & Aptroot (2013) – Brazil
- Malmidea papillosa Weerakoon & Aptroot (2014) – Sri Lanka
- Malmidea perisidiata (Malme) Kalb & Lücking (2011)
- Malmidea perplexa Kalb (2011) – Brazil; Thailand
- Malmidea piae (Kalb) Kalb (2011) – Thailand
- Malmidea piperina (Zahlbr.) Aptroot & Breuss (2015)
- Malmidea piperis (Spreng.) Kalb, Rivas Plata & Lumbsch (2011)
- Malmidea plicata Weerakoon & Aptroot (2016) – Sri Lanka
- Malmidea polisensis (Vain.) Kalb, Rivas Plata & Lumbsch (2011)
- Malmidea polycampia (Tuck.) Kalb & Lücking (2011)
- Malmidea psychotrioides (Kalb & Lücking) Kalb (2011)
- Malmidea reunionis Kalb (2012) – Réunion
- Malmidea rhodopisoides Kalb (2021) – Brazil
- Malmidea rhodopsis (Tuck.) Kalb (2011)
- Malmidea sanguineostigma Weerakoon & Aptroot (2013) – Sri Lanka
- Malmidea sorsogona (Vain.) Kalb, Rivas Plata & Lumbsch (2011)
- Malmidea subaurigera (Vain.) Kalb, Rivas Plata & Lumbsch (2011) – Asia
- Malmidea subcinerea Kalb (2021) – Venezuela
- Malmidea subgranifera (Kalb & Elix) Kalb & Elix (2011)
- Malmidea sulphureosorediata M.Cáceres, D.A.Mota & Aptroot (2013) – Brazil
- Malmidea taytayensis (Vain.) Kalb, Rivas Plata & Lumbsch (2011)
- Malmidea trailiana (Müll.Arg.) Kalb, Rivas Plata & Lumbsch (2011)
- Malmidea tratiana Kalb & Mongk. (2012) – Thailand
- Malmidea variabilis Kalb (2011) – Thailand
- Malmidea vinosa (Eschw.) Kalb, Rivas Plata & Lumbsch (2011)
- Malmidea volcaniana Kalb & J.Hern. (2021) – Brazil; Venezuela
