= Malmidea rhodopisoides =

Scientific classification
- Kingdom: Fungi
- Division: Ascomycota
- Class: Lecanoromycetes
- Order: Lecanorales
- Family: Malmideaceae
- Genus: Malmidea
- Species: M. rhodopisoides

Binomial name
- Malmidea rhodopisoides Kalb (2021)
- Holotype site: Grande Anel Rodoviário, Brazil

Species of lichen

Malmidea rhodopisoides is a species of corticolous (bark-dwelling), crustose lichen in the family Malmideaceae. It is found in Brazil.

== Taxonomy ==
The lichen was formally described as a new species in 2021 by the German lichenologist Klaus Kalb. The type specimen was collected by the author from Grande Anel Rodoviário (São Paulo) at an elevation of 670 m (2,200 ft). The species epithet alludes to its resemblance to Malmidea rhodopis.

== Description ==
Malmidea rhodopisoides is a crustose lichen with a thallus thickness of 20–40 μm. It is composed of isidia-like granules forming clumps that densely cover an orange-red prothallus. The thallus surface is dull, showing shades of grey to greenish grey, which turns orange-red when the cortex is abraded. Its medulla is also orange-red and has a K+ (red) chemical spot test reaction.

The species' photobiont is chlorococcoid, with cells measuring 6–8 μm in diameter. Apothecia are sessile and rounded, measuring 0.7–1.5 mm in diameter and 0.4–0.5 mm in height. The apothecial disc is initially flat but becomes slightly convex, ranging in colour from beige to dark brown. The margin around the disc is about 0.1 mm thick, bulging, and elevated above the disc, typically orange-red and occasionally partly blackish.

The excipulum of Malmidea rhodopisoides is of the piperis-type, hyaline (translucent) at the periphery, with the inner part containing hydrophobic granules of norsolorinic acid. The subhymenium is approximately 20 μm high and varies from hyaline to light brown. The hypothecium is relatively tall, ranging from 200 to 400 μm, reddish to dark brown in colour, and does not react to potassium hydroxide (K−). The epihymenium of the species is either indistinct or slightly granular, while the hymenium is hyaline and stands 70–80 μm high.

Asci within this species measure 60–70 by 20–25 μm, each containing 6–8 ascospores. These spores are broadly ellipsoid to fusiform, lack septa (internal partitions), with a uniformly thickened wall and a halo approximately 1 μm thick. The size of the spores ranges between 15 and 20 by 9–12 μm.

Chemically, Malmidea rhodopisoides is characterized by a major presence of norsolorinic acid and a lack of atranorin.

== Similar species ==
Malmidea rhodopisoides has characteristics that position it between Malmidea rhodopis and Malmidea isidiifera. M. rhodopis consistently has a smooth and often corticate thallus and is further distinguished by smaller spores measuring 9–15 by 5–8 μm. In contrast to M. isidiifera, which lacks norsolorinic acid in the inner layer of its structural excipulum and features a thallus covered with elongated, non-granular outgrowths (isidia), Malmidea rhodopisoides has traits that are intermediate between these two species.
