= Malmidea hechicerae =

Scientific classification
- Kingdom: Fungi
- Division: Ascomycota
- Class: Lecanoromycetes
- Order: Lecanorales
- Family: Malmideaceae
- Genus: Malmidea
- Species: M. hechicerae

Binomial name
- Malmidea hechicerae Kalb (2021)
- Holotype site: Monte Zerpa, Venezuela

Species of lichen

Malmidea hechicerae is a species of corticolous (bark-dwelling), crustose lichen in the family Malmideaceae. It is found in Venezuela.

== Taxonomy ==
The lichen was formally described as a new species in 2021 by the German lichenologist Klaus Kalb. The type specimen was collected from Monte Zerpa (Distr. Libertador, Mérida) at an elevation of 2,200 m (7,200 ft), where it was found growing in a cloud forest. The species epithet refers to its type locality, known as La Hechicera.

== Description ==
Malmidea hechicerae is a crustose lichen with a continuous thallus that is 40–60 μm thick. The thallus surface is verrucose, with the verrucae being more or less spherical and measuring 0.1–0.25 mm in diameter. These verrucae have a dull, whitish-grey appearance. The species lacks both soralia and isidia (reproductive propagules). The medulla of the verrucae and thallus is white, reacting K+ (lemon-yellow), occasionally showing a slightly orange-yellow hue, and P+ (orange), best observed in sections under a light microscope.

The photobiont of Malmidea hechicerae is chlorococcoid with cells measuring 6–8 μm in diameter. The apothecia are sessile and rounded, ranging from 0.6–1.3 mm in diameter and 0.3–0.4 mm in height. The discs of the apothecia are more or less flat and vary in colour from beige to brownish or dark brown. The excipulum is of the granifera-type, remaining entire, and is whitish to cream-coloured, bulging, and elevated above the disc. The ectal excipulum is hyaline (translucent) to brownish, particularly at the edges, while the medullary excipulum is filled with colourless opaque granules that partly dissolve in potassium hydroxide, producing a greenish-yellow efflux.

The subhymenium of the lichen is roughly 20 μm high and light brown, with a centrally located hypothecium measuring 50–70 μm high that narrows towards the margin and is dark brown, not reacting to K. The epihymenium is light brown, and the hymenium is hyaline, measuring 70–80 μm in height. The asci are 55–65 μm long and 8–15 μm wide, each containing 6 to 8 ascospores that lack septa. These ascospores are broadly ellipsoid, with equally thickened and halonate walls, measuring 13–17 by 7–9 μm, and are surrounded by a halo of 1–1.5 μm.

In terms of chemistry, Malmidea hechicerae is characterized by several xantholepinone substances, detectable using thin-layer chromatography. Atranorin is not detected in this species. Malmidea coralliformis similar in appearance to M. hechicerae but has a different set of xantholepinones.
