= Malmidea eeuuae =

Scientific classification
- Kingdom: Fungi
- Division: Ascomycota
- Class: Lecanoromycetes
- Order: Lecanorales
- Family: Malmideaceae
- Genus: Malmidea
- Species: M. eeuuae

Binomial name
- Malmidea eeuuae Kalb (2011)
- Holotype: Khao Yai National Park, Nakhon Ratchasima province, Thailand

Species of lichen

Malmidea eeuuae is a corticolous (bark-dwelling), crustose lichen in the family Malmideaceae. It was described in 2011 from Khao Yai National Park in north-eastern Thailand. The species has a finely warted thallus and non-septate, halonate ascospores, and it differs from M. coralliformis by its larger spores.

== Taxonomy ==
The species was introduced as Malmidea eeuuae by Klaus Kalb in 2011 within a study on Malmidea and the family Malmideaceae. The holotype was collected in a very disturbed tropical rainforest near the students' lodges (Ban Krong Kaew) in Khao Yai National Park, Nakhon Ratchasima province, at about 760 m elevation. The specific name honours Jutarat Sutjaritturakan ("Eeuu"), a Thai lichenologist.

== Description ==
The thallus is thin, crust-like and continuous (about 150–200 μm thick) on bark, densely warted (verrucose) with warts 0.1–0.15 mm high and 0.1–0.25 mm wide; soredia and isidia are absent. The medulla is cream-coloured and reacts potassium hydroxide (KOH)-positive (dark orange to orange-red). The photobiont is chlorococcoid (cells 5–8 μm in diameter). Apothecia are sessile, rounded to slightly flexuose, 0.2–0.5 mm across and 0.1–0.2 mm high; the disc is plane to slightly convex and light leather-brown to tawny, with a thin biatorine margin of the granifera type that starts entire and prominent but becomes slightly recurved and warty; the margin is 80–130 μm thick and whitish to cream. The proper exciple is hyaline at the periphery and internally shows a medullary layer of loosely arranged, periclinal hyphae with constricted septa, 30–50 μm wide, bearing yellowish to ochraceous-yellow hydrophobic granules that partly dissolve in KOH with a yellowish to greenish-yellow reaction. The subhymenium is about 50 μm high and chocolate- to olive-brown; the hypothecium is 50–75 μm high, brown and K–; the hymenium is 100–120 μm high and hyaline. Asci measure 55–70 × 16–20 μm. Ascospores number 4–6 (more rarely up to 8) per ascus, are colourless, ellipsoid, non-septate and halonate, typically 16–20 × 8–11 μm with a 1–1.5 μm halo. Reported chemistry includes xantholepinone G (major), contortin (submajor), concontortin (minor) and three unknown xantholepinones (minor).

== Habitat and distribution ==
Known from Khao Yai National Park, Malmidea eeuuae grows on tree bark in very disturbed tropical rainforest around 760 m elevation, near the students' lodges at Ban Krong Kaew.
