= Malmidea volcaniana =

Scientific classification
- Kingdom: Fungi
- Division: Ascomycota
- Class: Lecanoromycetes
- Order: Lecanorales
- Family: Malmideaceae
- Genus: Malmidea
- Species: M. volcaniana

Binomial name
- Malmidea volcaniana Kalb (2021)
- Holotype site: Cerro El Volcán, Venezuela

Species of lichen

Malmidea volcaniana is a species of corticolous (bark-dwelling), crustose lichen in the family Malmideaceae. It is found in Venezuela. A major characteristic of the species is the coralloid (coral-shaped) clumps of isidia-like outgrowths on the thallus surface.

== Taxonomy ==
The lichen was formally described as a new species in 2021 by the German lichenologist Klaus Kalb. The type specimen was collected from the Cerro El Volcán (Miranda), at an altitude of 1,460 m (4,790 ft). The species epithet refers to the type locality.

== Description ==
Malmidea volcaniana is a crustose lichen with a continuous thallus that ranges in thickness from 20 to 40 μm. The thallus is characterised by verrucose formations that are more or less spherical and coalesce with age, forming coralloid clumps of thin, isidia-like outgrowths. These formations are dull and vary in colour from greenish grey to ash-grey. The species has soralia that are more or less punctiform, measuring around 0.01 mm in diameter and intense orange-yellow in colour, emerging from warts that break off at the tips. These soralia react K+ (purple) and P+ (wine-red) to chemical spot tests.

The medulla of the verrucae and thallus is orange-yellow and also reacts to potassium hydroxide (K+ purple) and P+ (wine-red). The photobiont of this species is chlorococcoid, with cells measuring 6–8 μm in diameter.

Apothecia in Malmidea volcaniana are sessile and rounded, measuring between 0.3 and 0.8 mm in diameter and 0.2–0.3 mm in height. The apothecial discs are initially flat but become distinctly convex with age, coloured beige to chocolate-brown. The excipulum is of the granifera-type, entire, and ranges in colour from whitish and cream-coloured to greyish, typically paler than the disc. The ectal excipulum is hyaline (translucent), while the medullary excipulum is orange-yellow and filled with opaque, orange-yellow anthraquinones, only partially dissolving in a solution of potassium hydroxide, with a K+ (golden-yellow to golden-orange) reaction.

The subhymenium is around 20 μm high and light brown. The centrally located hypothecium is 75–85 μm high, narrowing towards the margin, and is dark brown in colour, not reacting to potassium hydroxide (K−). The epihymenium is indistinct, and the hymenium measures 75–100 μm in height and is hyaline.

The asci of Malmidea volcaniana are 50–60 μm by 15–20 μm in size, and each contains 6–8 ascospores. These spores lack septa and are broadly ellipsoid with equally thickened walls and a halo of 1–1.5 μm. The spores measure 11–17 by 7–10 μm.

Chemically, this species contains emodin and emodic acid as major or somewhat major lichen products, atranorin and emodin bisanthrone as minor components, and some unknown xantholepinones.
