= Malmidea cineracea =

Scientific classification
- Domain: Eukaryota
- Kingdom: Fungi
- Division: Ascomycota
- Class: Lecanoromycetes
- Order: Lecanorales
- Family: Malmideaceae
- Genus: Malmidea
- Species: M. cineracea

Binomial name
- Malmidea cineracea Breuss & Lücking (2015)

Species of lichen

Malmidea cineracea is a little-known species of corticolous (bark-dwelling), crustose lichen in the family Malmideaceae. It is found in Nicaragua.

== Taxonomy ==
The lichen was formally described as a new species in 2015 by the lichenologists Othmar Breuss and Robert Lücking. The type specimen was collected by the first author from a Caribbean lowland rainforest in the Indio Maíz Biological Reserve (San Juan River). The name of the species, cineracea, translates to "ash-greyish", and alludes to the colour of the margins of its apothecia.

== Description ==
Malmidea cineracea grows on bark and has a granulose-isidiate texture with a greenish-grey colour, appearing dull on a whitish, fibrous base layer, and is about 150–200 μm thick. The individual granules range from 70 to 150 μm in diameter, and their cortex, which is colourless, measures 10 to 15 μm thick. The photobiont is chlorococcoid, forming spherical or flattened groups of 30 to 60 μm in diameter, and consists of cells 6 to 8 μm in diameter. The medulla of the lichen has a yellowish hue and does not react to a solution of potassium hydroxide (K−).

The apothecia, or fruiting bodies, are sessile and range from 0.5 to 1.1 mm in diameter and 0.20 to 0.35 mm in height. They are typically rounded but can be slightly irregular, with a flat disc that is grey-brown to brown. The margin is smooth, pale brownish grey, distinct but not prominently raised, and about 0.1 mm wide. The excipulum is compact, with a hyaline outer layer (10–30 μm) and an inner layer densely encrusted with yellowish-brown granules, which turn pale greenish-yellow when treated with potassium hydroxide. The subhymenium is 10–20 μm high and brownish, while the hypothecium is dark brown to brownish black, 100–150 μm deep, and does not react to potassium hydroxide. The hymenium is approximately 80 μm high, hyaline, and turns blue when stained with iodine; it contains simple paraphyses that are not thickened at the tips. The asci are narrowly clavate (club-shaped), measuring 60–70 by 12–16 μm, with a thickened apical wall but no visible internal structure. There are typically 6 to 8 ascospores per ascus, measuring 12–15 by 6–8 μm, ellipsoidal with somewhat pointed ends, and surrounded by a halo that is 0.5–1.0 μm thick.

No conidiomata have been observed to occur in this species, and thin-layer chromatography reveals no substances except for thin bands of terpenoids, likely originating from the bark. Standard chemical spot tests on the thallus and excipulum are all negative.

=== Similar species ===
Malmidea cineracea is similar to Malmidea furfurosa, but can be distinguished by its pale apothecial margins (as opposed to black in M. furfurosa), an excipulum that contains crystals but no medullary tissue, and a yellowish medulla.

Malmidea attenboroughii, which also has a granulose-isidiate thallus, bears a morphological resemblance to Malmidea cineracea. The former species, found in the Amazon rainforest of Bolivia, can be distinguished by its abraded margin, which internally contains yellowish-brown granules that are unreactive when treated with potassium hydroxide (K−).

== Habitat and distribution ==
Malmidea cineracea has been exclusively observed growing on the bark of trees in a lowland rainforest, with its presence limited to Nicaragua. It is one of five Malmidea species that occur in that country.
