= Malmidea perplexa =

Scientific classification
- Kingdom: Fungi
- Division: Ascomycota
- Class: Lecanoromycetes
- Order: Lecanorales
- Family: Malmideaceae
- Genus: Malmidea
- Species: M. perplexa

Binomial name
- Malmidea perplexa Kalb (2011)

Species of lichen

Malmidea perplexa is a corticolous (bark-dwelling), crustose lichen in the family Malmideaceae. It was described in 2011 from northern Thailand. The species has a smooth, grey-green thallus without warts and ascospores that are non-septate and halonate. It resembles Malmidea leptoloma but differs in having lighter-coloured apothecial discs and margins and a smooth thallus.

== Taxonomy ==
The species was introduced as Malmidea perplexa by Klaus Kalb in 2011 within a study on Malmidea and the family Malmideaceae. The holotype was collected on the descent from Doi Mon Larn to Mae Kampong village, east-south-east of Chiang Mai, in evergreen montane forest dominated by Lithocarpus, Quercus and Castanopsis; the specific epithet reflects that the senior author had known the species from Brazil for decades before finding it in Thailand again.

== Description ==
The thallus is crust-like, continuous and smooth, about 100–250 μm thick, dull to slightly shiny and grey-green; soredia and isidia are absent. The medulla is whitish and K–. The photobiont is chlorococcoid with cells 6–8 μm in diameter. Apothecia are sessile, rounded, 0.4–0.7 mm across and 150–180 μm high; the disc is plane to slightly convex and brown-grey to sooty, bordered by a thin biatorine margin of the piperis type that is about 20 μm thick, slightly prominent and whitish-grey to dark brownish-grey. The proper exciple is hyaline and internally lacks the medullary layer (about 30–70 μm wide) and lacks hydrophobic granules; the subhymenium is about 20 μm high and light brown, the hymenium 75–120 μm and hyaline, and the hypothecium 30–80 μm and hyaline, K–; the epihymenium is indistinct. Asci measure 50–65 × 10–15 μm. Ascospores number 6–8 per ascus, are colourless, ellipsoid, non-septate and halonate, 9–13 × 5–7 μm with an about 0.5-μm halo. No lichen substances were detected by thin-layer chromatography or high-performance liquid chromatography.

== Habitat and distribution ==
The species grows on tree bark in evergreen forests in Thailand (including sites in Chiang Mai and Khao Yai and the Kaeng Krachan area) and is also recorded from south-eastern Brazil (São Paulo), at roughly 520–1000 m elevation.
