= Malmidea leucopiperis =

Scientific classification
- Kingdom: Fungi
- Division: Ascomycota
- Class: Lecanoromycetes
- Order: Lecanorales
- Family: Malmideaceae
- Genus: Malmidea
- Species: M. leucopiperis

Binomial name
- Malmidea leucopiperis Kalb (2021)
- Holotype site: Itatiaia National Park, Brazil

Species of lichen

Malmidea leucopiperis is a species of corticolous (bark-dwelling), crustose lichen in the family Malmideaceae. It is found in Brazil.

== Taxonomy ==
The lichen was formally described as a new species in 2021 by the German lichenologist Klaus Kalb. The type specimen was collected from Itatiaia National Park (Rio de Janeiro) at an altitude of 850 m (2,790 ft). The species epithet alludes to its resemblance to Malmidea piperis, with a key difference in the hypothecium's colour—light greyish to beige compared to the dark brown in M. piperis.

== Description ==
Malmidea leucopiperis is a crustose lichen with a continuous thallus measuring 50–80 μm in thickness. Its surface is smooth and dull, appearing grey or greenish grey, and can turn orange-red when abraded. Neither isidia nor soralia (reproductive propagules) are present on this species. The medulla of the thallus is orange-red and has a K+ (purple) chemical spot test reaction.

The photobiont of this species is chlorococcoid, with cell dimensions of 6–8 μm in diameter. The apothecia of Malmidea leucopiperis are sessile and rounded, ranging from 0.3 to 0.6 mm in diameter and 0.15 to 0.2 mm in height. The apothecial disc is initially flat, becoming slightly convex, with colours ranging from light beige to brown-grey or brown. Its margin is thin, about 0.1 mm, slightly raised, and varies in colour from whitish grey to dark brownish grey or black.

The excipulum is of the piperis-type and mostly hyaline (translucent), though it can appear brownish or blackish at the upper periphery, and lacks hydrophobic granules. The subhymenium is about 10 μm high and hyaline, while the centrally located hypothecium is light greyish to beige, measuring 40–50 μm in height and is K−. The epihymenium of Malmidea leucopiperis is either indistinct or slightly granular, and the hymenium stands 60–70 μm high and is hyaline.

Asci within this species measure 40–50 by 8–10 μm, each containing 6–8 ascospores. These spores are broadly ellipsoid to fusiform, non-septate, and have a uniformly thickened wall with a halo of approximately 1 μm. Their size ranges from 9–12 by 4–6 μm.

Chemically, this species is characterized by a major presence of norsolorinic acid and the absence of atranorin, as determined through thin-layer chromatography.

== Habitat and distribution ==
Malmidea leucopiperis occurs in the Atlantic rainforest in southern Brazil. It has been recorded from Rio de Janeiro, Pernambuco, and Sergipe.
