= Malmidea hernandeziana =

Scientific classification
- Kingdom: Fungi
- Division: Ascomycota
- Class: Lecanoromycetes
- Order: Lecanorales
- Family: Malmideaceae
- Genus: Malmidea
- Species: M. hernandeziana

Binomial name
- Malmidea hernandeziana Kalb (2021)
- Holotype site: Henri Pittier National Park, Venezuela

Species of lichen

Malmidea hernandeziana is a little-known species of corticolous (bark-dwelling), crustose lichen in the family Malmideaceae. It is found in Venezuela. The distinctive features of this species include a thallus with coralloid-like outgrowths, light-coloured fruiting bodies (ascomata) with a specialised structural layer, relatively large spores that tend to have slightly thickened walls at their ends, and the absence of specific lichen products typically found in other species of the genus. This combination of characteristics sets Malmidea hernandeziana apart from other species in the genus Malmidea.

== Taxonomy ==
The lichen was formally described as a new species in 2021 by the German lichenologist Klaus Kalb. The type specimen was collected by the author from Henri Pittier National Park (Aragua) at an altitude between 1,100 and 1,200 m (3,600 and 3,900 ft); there, it was found in a tropical mountain rainforest. The species epithet honours the Venezuelan lichenologist Jésus Hernández, who collected the holotype. At the time of its publication, the lichen was known to occur only at the type locality.

== Description ==
Malmidea hernandeziana is a crustose lichen with a thallus that is more or less continuous and ranges in thickness from 30 to 70 μm. The thallus is smooth and dull, devoid of warts, and features isidia. These isidia are granular to coralloid, measuring 0.05–0.1 mm in length and 0.05 mm in width, and they densely cover the thallus. Soralia are absent in this species.

The medulla of the thallus is white and does not react to a potassium hydroxide solution (i.e., the K spot test). The photobiont of Malmidea hernandeziana is chlorococcoid, with cells measuring 6–8 μm in diameter. The apothecia are sessile and rounded, varying from 0.5 to 1.3 mm in diameter and 0.4–0.5 mm in height. Initially, the discs of the apothecia are flat, but they become slightly convex over time and are beige in colour. The margin of the apothecia is thin, approximately 0.1 mm thick, slightly prominent, and whitish grey in colour. The excipulum is of the piperis-type and is more or less hyaline (translucent), lacking hydrophobic granules.

The subhymenium is around 10–15 μm high and ranges from hyaline to light brownish. The centrally located hypothecium is 80–100 μm high and is chocolate-brown in colour, showing no reaction to K. The epihymenium of the species is indistinct, while the hymenium is hyaline and measures 110–130 μm in height. The asci are 90–110 μm long and 15–22 μm wide, each containing 6 to 8 broadly ellipsoid to fusiform ascospores. These ascospores lack septa (internal partitions), with walls that are often slightly thickened at the ends, and are surrounded by a halo measuring 1–1.3 μm. The ascospores measure 14–22 by 8–10 μm.

Chemically, Malmidea hernandeziana lacks detectable lichen products when analysed using thin-layer chromatography.
