= Malmidea subcinerea =

Scientific classification
- Kingdom: Fungi
- Division: Ascomycota
- Class: Lecanoromycetes
- Order: Lecanorales
- Family: Malmideaceae
- Genus: Malmidea
- Species: M. subcinerea

Binomial name
- Malmidea subcinerea Kalb (2021)
- Holotype site: Monte Zerpa, Venezuela

Species of lichen

Malmidea subcinerea is a species of corticolous (bark-dwelling), crustose lichen in the family Malmideaceae. It is found in Venezuela. The lichen has a smooth, dull thallus varying in colour from grey to olive, with a white internal medulla. It has sessile, rounded apothecia (spore-bearing structures) with light beige to greyish-brown discs.

== Taxonomy ==
The lichen was formally described as a new species in 2021 by the German lichenologist Klaus Kalb. The type specimen was collected from Monte Zerpa (Mérida at an altitude of 2,200 m (7,200 ft); there, it was found in a cloud forest. The species epithet alludes to its resemblance to Malmidea cinerea. This lookalike differs from M. subcinera in having apothecia of the granifera-type, and in having at least two xantholepinone substances.

== Description ==
Malmidea subcinerea is a crustose lichen characterised by a continuous thallus that ranges from 80 to 120 μm in thickness. The thallus surface is smooth and dull, with colours from grey and greenish grey to olive, and neither isidia nor soralia present. The medulla of the thallus is white and does not react to a solution of potassium hydroxide (K−).

This species' photobiont is chlorococcoid, consisting of green algal cells measuring 10–12 μm in diameter. The apothecia of Malmidea subcinerea are sessile and rounded, measuring between 0.4 and 0.9 mm in diameter and 0.2–0.3 mm in height. Initially, the apothecial discs are flat but become slightly convex, coloured light beige to light greyish brown. The margins around the discs are approximately 0.15 mm thick, slightly prominent, and vary from whitish grey to brownish grey in colour.

The excipulum is of the piperis-type, more or less hyaline (translucent) at the periphery and brownish at the centre and upper periphery. This species lacks hydrophobic granules. The subhymenium is about 10 μm high, hyaline or slightly brownish, while the hypothecium is centrally 50–70 (up to 125) μm high, dark brown to reddish brown, and does not react to potassium hydroxide (K−). The epihymenium, if present, is light brown, and the hymenium is hyaline, measuring 100–120 μm in height.

The asci within Malmidea subcinerea are 60–75 by 10–15 μm in size, each containing 6–8 ascospores. These spores are broadly ellipsoid to fusiform, lack septate (internal partitions), with a uniformly thickened wall and a halo approximately 1 μm thick. The spore sizes range from 9–12 by 5–7 μm.

Chemically, no lichen substances were detected in Malmidea subcinerea through thin-layer chromatography analysis.
