= Lecanora kansriae =

Scientific classification
- Kingdom: Fungi
- Division: Ascomycota
- Class: Lecanoromycetes
- Order: Lecanorales
- Family: Lecanoraceae
- Genus: Lecanora
- Species: L. kansriae

Binomial name
- Lecanora kansriae Papong & Lumbsch (2011)
- Holotype: Doi Suthep, Thailand

Species of lichen

Lecanora kansriae is a species of corticolous (bark-dwelling) crustose lichen in the family Lecanoraceae. Found exclusively in northern Thailand, it was described as a new species in 2011 by the lichenologists Khwanruan Papong and H. Thorsten Lumbsch. The species is known only from its type locality on Doi Suthep, Chiang Mai province, where it was discovered growing on the bark of oak trees within a lower montane rainforest dominated by oak and chestnut, at an elevation of about 1600 metres.

== Description ==
The thallus (lichen body) of Lecanora kansriae is crustose and has a scattered-verrucose (wart-like) to verruculose surface, occasionally forming a continuous crust. It is yellowish-white to pale grey, and lacks pruina (powdery or frosted coating). No soredia (powdery reproductive structures) or prothallus (visible underlying growth layer) have been observed.

The apothecia (fruiting bodies) are sessile, measuring 0.5–1.2 mm in diameter, with pale to dark reddish-brown discs that are free of pruina. Their margins are thick, verrucose to verruculose, and match the colour of the surrounding thallus. Microscopically, the amphithecium (outer layer of apothecium) contains small crystals (campestris-type), which dissolve in potassium hydroxide solution. The epihymenium (uppermost hymenial layer) is reddish-brown, 10–15 μm thick, also containing small crystals (pulicaris-type). The hymenium (spore-producing tissue) and hypothecium (layer beneath hymenium) are both hyaline (colourless), with the hymenium containing oil droplets. Paraphyses (filamentous structures within the hymenium) are sparsely branched and not or only slightly thickened at the tips.

The asci (spore-bearing cells) are clavate (club-shaped), each containing eight spores. The ascospores are ellipsoid, measuring 17.5–20 by 10–12 μm. Pycnidia (asexual fruiting bodies) and conidia (asexual spores) have not been observed.

Chemical analysis reveals that Lecanora kansriae contains atranorin and stictic acid as major secondary metabolites, along with chloroatranorin in minor amounts.

== Similar species ==
Lecanora kansriae closely resembles Lecanora toroyensis and Lecanora tropica. It differs from L. toroyensis by its chemistry—L. toroyensis produces 2'-O-methylperlatolic acid and has an allophana-type amphithecium rather than campestris-type. It can be separated from L. tropica, which contains the chodatin chemosyndrome and has a pulicaris-type amphithecium.

Although conidia were not observed, Lecanora kansriae is placed in the genus Lecanora rather than Vainionora because of its distinctive campestris-type amphithecium with small crystals and its hyaline hypothecium—two characteristics not found in species of Vainionora.

== See also ==
- List of Lecanora species
