= Malmidea allobakeri =

Scientific classification
- Kingdom: Fungi
- Division: Ascomycota
- Class: Lecanoromycetes
- Order: Lecanorales
- Family: Malmideaceae
- Genus: Malmidea
- Species: M. allobakeri

Binomial name
- Malmidea allobakeri Kalb & M.Cáceres (2021)
- Holotype site: Centro de Pesquisa do Cacao, Venezuela

Species of lichen

Malmidea allobakeri is a species of corticolous (bark-dwelling), crustose lichen in the family Malmideaceae. It is found in Venezuela.

== Taxonomy ==
The lichen was formally described as a new species in 2021 by the lichenologists Klaus Kalb and Marcela Cáceres. The type specimen was collected by the second author from the Centro de Pesquisa do Cacao (Itabuna) in Atlantic Forest. The species epithet alludes to its similarity of Malmidea bakeri.

== Description ==
Malmidea allobakeri is a crustose lichen with a continuous thallus that is 40–70 μm thick. The surface of the thallus is verrucose, with verrucae measuring 0.075–0.1 mm in height and 0.07–0.1 mm in width. The thallus has a dull appearance, showing shades of greenish-grey to brownish, and is devoid of soralia and isidia (reproductive propagules). The medulla, both of the verrucae and the thallus, is white to faintly yellow and reacts to a solution of potassium hydroxide (i.e., the K spot test) with an orange to reddish colour. The lichen hosts a chlorococcoid (green algal) photobiont, whose cells measure 6–8 μm in diameter.

The apothecia of Malmidea allobakeri are sessile and rounded, measuring 0.3–0.8 mm in diameter and 0.2–0.3 mm in height. The apothecial discs are plane to slightly convex and range in colour from dark chocolate brown to blackish. The excipulum, of the granifera type, is initially entire but becomes granular as the lichen ages and may partly or entirely vanish. It is cream-coloured to greyish or black in colour. The excipulum is hyaline at the periphery and internally contains pockets of the medullary layer filled with greyish to ochraceous-yellow hydrophobic granules. These granules are opaque and only partially dissolve in potassium hydroxide solution, resulting in a K+ orange-yellowish to greenish lemon-yellow reaction. The subhymenium is approximately 25 μm high and light brown, while the centrally located hypothecium is 80–100 μm high, narrowing towards the margin, and dark brown with no reaction to K tests. The epihymenium of this species is indistinct, and the hymenium is hyaline, measuring 90–110 μm in height. The asci are sized 70–80 μm by 15–20 μm, containing 6 (occasionally up to 8) non-septate, halonate, ellipsoid ascospores per ascus, measuring 10–14 by 7–8 μm, with a halo of 1–1.5 μm.

Chemically, Malmidea allobakeri is characterised by the presence of several unidentified xantholepinones, distinct from those found in Malmidea bakeri, and it lacks atranorin.

== Habitat and distribution ==
Malmidea allobakeri has been recorded from several states of Brazil: Bahia, Sergipe, Pernambuco, and Alagoas. It has been found at elevations ranging up to 800 m (2,600 ft).
