= Malmidea atlanticoides =

Scientific classification
- Kingdom: Fungi
- Division: Ascomycota
- Class: Lecanoromycetes
- Order: Lecanorales
- Family: Malmideaceae
- Genus: Malmidea
- Species: M. atlanticoides

Binomial name
- Malmidea atlanticoides Kalb & M.Cáceres (2021)
- Holotype site: Parque Nacional Serra de Itabaiana, Venezuela

Species of lichen

Malmidea atlanticoides is a little-known species of corticolous (bark-dwelling), crustose lichen in the family Malmideaceae. It is found in Brazil.

== Taxonomy ==
It was formally described as a new species in 2021 by the lichenologists Klaus Kalb and Marcela Cáceres. The type specimen was collected by the authors from the Parque Nacional Serra de Itabaiana (Sergipe) at an elevation of 190 m (620 ft). The species epithet alludes to its resemblance to Malmidea atlantica, the species to which it was initially referred. Subsequent analysis revealed its chemical differences with this species. Malmidea atlanticoides is only known to occur at its type locality.

== Description ==
Malmidea atlanticoides is a crustose lichen with a continuous thallus measuring 75–100 μm in thickness. The thallus surface is verrucose (warty), featuring more or less spherical verrucae that are 0.1–0.25 mm in diameter. The colour of the verrucae ranges from dull ash-grey to greenish-grey and light olive. Both soralia and isidia are absent in this species. The medulla of the verrucae and the thallus is orange-yellow, showing spot test reactions of K+ (orange to reddish) and P+ (vermilion). The photobiont is chlorococcoid with cells measuring 6–8 μm in diameter.

The apothecia of Malmidea atlanticoides are sessile and rounded, with a diameter of 0.5–0.8 mm and a height of 0.3–0.4 mm. The apothecial discs are flat to slightly concave, and their colour varies from beige to light brownish. The excipulum is of the granifera-type, initially entire and becoming granular with age. It is whitish to cream-coloured, bulging, and towers over the disc. The ectal excipulum is hyaline, while the medullary excipulum is filled with orange-yellow hydrophobic granules that are nubilous and dissolve in KOH, producing a lemon-yellow efflux. The base of the apothecium reacts to K with an orange-red colour. The subhymenium is approximately 25 μm high and light brown, while the centrally located hypothecium is 80–100 μm high, narrowing towards the margin, and dark brown without reacting to K. The epihymenium is indistinct and the hymenium is hyaline, measuring 100–110 μm in height.

The asci of Malmidea atlanticoides are 60–80 μm long and 15–20 μm wide. Each ascus contains four to eight ascospores that lack septa. These ascospores are broadly ellipsoid, with equally thickened and halonate walls, measuring 12–15 by 8–9 μm with a halo of 1–1.5 μm.

Chemically, the species is characterised by the presence of atranorin as a major component, along with an unknown anthraquinone substance, detectable using thin-layer chromatography. Its lookalike, Malmidea atlantica, lacks both atranorin and the unknown anthraquinone.
