= Malmidea inflata =

Scientific classification
- Kingdom: Fungi
- Division: Ascomycota
- Class: Lecanoromycetes
- Order: Lecanorales
- Family: Malmideaceae
- Genus: Malmidea
- Species: M. inflata

Binomial name
- Malmidea inflata Kalb (2011)

Species of lichen

Malmidea inflata is a corticolous (bark-dwelling), crustose lichen in the family Malmideaceae. It was described in 2011 from northern Thailand; the species has a densely warted thallus and non-septate, halonate ascospores, and it resembles M. aurigera but differs in having a whitish medulla rather than bright yellow in the thallus warts.

== Taxonomy ==
The species was introduced as Malmidea inflata by Klaus Kalb in 2011 within a study on Malmidea and the family Malmideaceae. The holotype was collected on the descent from Doi Mon Larn to Mae Kampong village, near Mae On east-south-east of Chiang Mai, in evergreen montane forest dominated by Lithocarpus, Quercus and Castanopsis at approximately mid-elevation. The specific epithet refers to the conspicuous thallus warts, which look like tiny inflated balloons.

== Description ==
The thallus is thin, crust-like and continuous (about 150–200 μm thick) on bark, densely warted (verrucose) with warts 0.2–0.3 mm high and 0.2–0.3 mm wide; soredia and isidia are absent. The medulla is whitish and reacts potassium hydroxide (KOH)-positive (orange). The photobiont is chlorococcoid, with cells 5–8 μm in diameter. Apothecia are sessile, rounded and 0.7–1 mm across and 0.3–0.4 mm high; the disc is plane to slightly convex, dark brown to blackish, and bordered by a thin biatorine margin of the granifera type that is 20–40 μm thick, initially entire and slightly prominent but tending to become recurved with age; the margin ranges from grey to dark brownish or blackish. The proper exciple is hyaline at the periphery and internally shows a medullary layer with only a few hydrophobic granules that dissolve in KOH without a distinct colour reaction. The subhymenium is about 10 μm high and olive-brown, the epihymenium about 25 μm and dark brown, the hymenium 75–100 μm and hyaline, and the hypothecium 100–170 μm and blackish-brown, with a K– reaction. Asci measure 65–80 × 10–15 μm. Ascospores number 6–8 (occasionally as few as 4) per ascus, are colourless, ellipsoid, non-septate and halonate, 10–13 (more rarely up to 17) × 6–8 μm with an approximately 1-μm halo. Reported chemistry includes atranorin (major) with several as-yet unidentified lichen substances (minor).

== Habitat and distribution ==
Known from northern Thailand, the species grows on tree bark in evergreen montane forest near the Doi Mon Larn–Mae Kampong area east-south-east of Chiang Mai, where the canopy is dominated by Lithocarpus, Quercus and Castanopsis.
