= Malmidea allopapillosa =

Scientific classification
- Kingdom: Fungi
- Division: Ascomycota
- Class: Lecanoromycetes
- Order: Lecanorales
- Family: Malmideaceae
- Genus: Malmidea
- Species: M. allopapillosa

Binomial name
- Malmidea allopapillosa Kalb (2021)
- Holotype site: Páramo de Mariño, Venezuela

Species of lichen

Malmidea allopapillosa is a species of corticolous (bark-dwelling), crustose lichen in the family Malmideaceae. It is found in Venezuela.

== Taxonomy ==
The lichen was formally described as a new species in 2021 by the German lichenologist Klaus Kalb. The type specimen was collected by the author in 1980 from a cloud forest in the surroundings of Tovar, Páramo de Mariño, (Mérida) at an altitude of 3,000 m (9,800 ft). The species epithet refers to its resemblance to Malmidea papillosa.

== Description ==
Malmidea allopapillosa is a crustose lichen with a thallus that is either continuous or cracked and measures 50–100 μm in thickness. The surface of the thallus is smooth and dull, with warts that are 0.2–0.3 mm in diameter and with a whitish-grey colour. This species lacks both isidia and soralia. The cortex of the thallus reacts to a solution of potassium hydroxide (i.e., the K spot test) with a yellow colouration, while the medulla of the thallus is white is K−. The medulla of the warts is peach-coloured to pink, with an orange-red reaction with K+, which soon changes to lemon-yellow. The photobiont of this species is chlorococcoid, with cells measuring 6–8 μm in diameter.

The apothecia of Malmidea allopapillosa are sessile and rounded, measuring 0.3–0.8 mm in diameter and 0.4–0.5 mm in height. The apothecial discs are flat and range in colour from light to dark brown. The margin of the apothecia is thin, approximately 0.05 mm thick, and varies in colour from whitish-grey to dark brownish-grey. As the lichen ages, the margin is excluded, forming a piperis-type excipulum that is more or less hyaline (translucent) or brown at the periphery, with the inner part being hyaline and lacking hydrophobic granules. The subhymenium is about 15 μm high and varies from hyaline to light brown, while the centrally located hypothecium is 70–90 μm high, narrowing towards the margin, and has a reddish to dark brown colour unreactive to K. The epihymenium is brown, and the hymenium is hyaline, measuring 130–150 μm in height. The base of the apothecia is partially filled with opaque granules that react K+ (greenish-yellow).

The asci of Malmidea allopapillosa measure 90–120 by 20–25 μm. Each ascus contains 6–8 broadly ellipsoid, ascospores that lack septa. These ascospores have walls that are equally thickened and halonate, measuring 14–17 by 8–10 μm with a halo of 1 μm.

Chemically, this species is characterised by the presence of atranorin as a major component, along with approximately 10 unidentified xantholepinone substances, detectable using thin-layer chromatography. Its lookalike Malmidea papillosa lacks atranorin and has a different set of xantholepinones.
