= Malmidea isidiifera =

Scientific classification
- Kingdom: Fungi
- Division: Ascomycota
- Class: Lecanoromycetes
- Order: Lecanorales
- Family: Malmideaceae
- Genus: Malmidea
- Species: M. isidiifera

Binomial name
- Malmidea isidiifera Kalb (2021)
- Holotype site: Itatiaia National Park, Brazil

Species of lichen

Malmidea isidiifera is a species of corticolous (bark-dwelling), crustose lichen in the family Malmideaceae. It is found in Brazil and Venezuela.

== Taxonomy ==
The lichen was formally described as a new species in 2021 by German lichenologist Klaus Kalb. The type specimen was collected from Itatiaia National Park (Rio de Janeiro) at an elevation of 1,100 m (3,600 ft). The species epithet alludes to the presence of isidia on the thallus. The species also occurs in Venezuela.

== Description ==
Malmidea isidiifera is characterised by a crustose thallus that is continuous and has a thickness ranging from 30 to 70 μm. The thallus surface is smooth to slightly granular and dull, with a grey colour that turns orange-red when the cortex is abraded. The species is distinguished by its isidia, which are granular to coralloid, densely covering the thallus, each measuring 0.05–0.1 mm in length and 0.05 mm in width. The medulla of the thallus is orange-red and has a K+ (purple) chemical spot test reaction.

The photobiont of Malmidea isidiifera is chlorococcoid, with cells measuring 6–8 μm in diameter. The apothecia are sessile and rounded, varying in diameter from 0.7 to 1.5 mm and in height from 0.4 to 0.5 mm. Initially, the discs of the apothecia are flat, but they become distinctly convex over time, with a colour range from light brown-grey to dark brown. The margin of the apothecia is thin, about 0.1 mm thick, slightly prominent, and varies in colour from whitish grey to dark brownish grey.

The excipulum of the species is of the piperis-type and is hyaline (translucent) at the periphery, with the inner part being reddish to dark brown. It lacks hydrophobic granules, which occur is some other species in genus Malmidea. The subhymenium is about 20 μm high and ranges from hyaline to light brown. The hypothecium is significantly larger, measuring 150–200 μm in height, and is reddish to dark brown, showing no reaction to the K spot test. The epihymenium of Malmidea isidiifera is indistinct, while the hymenium is hyaline and measures 100–140 μm in height.

The asci are 70–100 μm long and 20–25 μm wide, each containing 6 to 8 broadly ellipsoid to fusiform ascospores. These ascospores lack septa (internal partitions), and have walls that are equally thickened and surrounded by a halo about 1 μm thick. The ascospores measure 17–23 by 7–10 μm.

In terms of chemistry, Malmidea isidiifera contains atranorin and norsolorinic acid, both major components in its makeup.
