= Malmidea nigra =

Scientific classification
- Kingdom: Fungi
- Division: Ascomycota
- Class: Lecanoromycetes
- Order: Lecanorales
- Family: Malmideaceae
- Genus: Malmidea
- Species: M. nigra

Binomial name
- Malmidea nigra Aptroot & Oliveira-Junior (2022)

Species of lichen-forming fungus

Malmidea nigra is a corticolous (bark-dwelling) crustose lichen in the family Malmideaceae. It forms small, dark patches on tree bark that are pale greenish only at the edges and otherwise almost entirely black, resting on a distinct black base layer. The species is characterized by very small, somewhat diamond-shaped ascospores, and by the absence of detectable lichen substances; it is instead identified using microscopic features and DNA sequence data. It was formally described in 2022 from material collected in the Reserva Cristalino region of Mato Grosso. It has also been recorded from neighbouring Amazonas.

== Taxonomy ==
Malmidea nigra was described in 2022 by André Aptroot and G. Oliveira-Junior from material collected on tree bark in primary rainforest in the Reserva Cristalino, Mato Grosso, Brazil, at an elevation of 250–350 m (820–1,150 ft). The holotype (A. Aptroot 83047) is deposited in the herbarium of the Federal University of Mato Grosso do Sul (CGMS). In the global identification key to Malmidea, it falls in the couplet for species whose thallus begins as tiny fragments on top of a black hypothallus, green only at the margin but almost black over most of its surface. It was compared with Phyllopsora because the ascospores are somewhat rhomboid, but the combination of thallus morphology and ascomatal features, together with DNA sequence data that place it within Malmidea, support recognizing it as a distinct species in that genus.

== Description ==
The thallus is crustose and begins as tiny fragments on top of a black hypothallus. It soon becomes continuous, dull, and not corticate, pale greenish at the edge but almost black over most of the surface. It covers areas of up to 5 cm (2 in) in diameter and is up to 0.1 mm thick, resting on a black hypothallus about 0.2 mm thick that also surrounds the thallus as a prothallus. The medulla is whitish and the photobiont is trebouxioid. The ascomata are sessile, solitary and constricted at the base; they are round to lobate, 0.2–0.8 mm wide and up to 0.3 mm high, with a pale brown disc that is flat to slightly concave and a gray margin raised above the disc and about 0.1 mm wide. The excipulum (rim tissue) is hyaline and lacks crystals. The epihymenium is pale brown and the hypothecium is dark brown. The hamathecium is not inspersed and gives an IKI+ blue reaction, mainly in the ascus tips. The asci are Porpidia-type. Each ascus contains eight ascospores. The ascospores are hyaline (colorless), simple, fusiform to rhomboid, measure 10–11.5 × 2.5–3.5 μm, and lack a surrounding gelatinous sheath. Pycnidia have not been observed. In standard spot tests the thallus shows no reactions (UV−, C−, K−, KC− and P−), and thin-layer chromatography did not detect any lichen products (secondary metabolites).

== Habitat and distribution ==
Malmidea nigra grows on tree bark in primary rain forest in the Reserva Cristalino region of Mato Grosso, Brazil, at elevations between about 250 and 350 m (820 and 1,150 ft). As of its original publication, it was known only from Brazil. It has since been documented from Amazonas.
