= Malmidea densisidiata =

Scientific classification
- Kingdom: Fungi
- Division: Ascomycota
- Class: Lecanoromycetes
- Order: Lecanorales
- Family: Malmideaceae
- Genus: Malmidea
- Species: M. densisidiata

Binomial name
- Malmidea densisidiata Aptroot & Oliveira-Junior (2022)

Species of lichen-forming fungus

Malmidea densisidiata is a corticolous (bark-dwelling) lichen in the family Malmideaceae. It forms small pale greenish patches on tree bark in primary rainforest in central Brazil. The species is distinctive for its dense cover of short, finger-like isidia (asexual outgrowths) and for yellow pigments in its inner tissues. It was formally described in 2022 from material collected in the Reserva Cristalino region of Mato Grosso. It has since been reported from the neighboring state of Rondônia.

== Taxonomy ==
Malmidea densisidiata was described in 2022 by André Aptroot and G. Oliveira-Junior from material collected on tree bark in primary rainforest at Reserva Cristalino, Mato Grosso, Brazil, at 250–350 m (820–1,150 ft) elevation. The holotype (A. Aptroot 82860), the reference specimen for the name, is deposited in the herbarium of the Federal University of Mato Grosso do Sul (CGMS). The species was compared with Malmidea corallophora, which looks similar but has much larger ascospores (about 30 × 15 μm). By contrast, M. densisidiata has smaller ellipsoid ascospores (11–12.5 × 4.5–5.5 μm) and a thallus densely covered with isidia. This combination of characters separates it from similar species. The specific epithet refers to the dense layer of isidia on the thallus.

== Description ==
The thallus of Malmidea densisidiata is crustose, mostly continuous and corticate (with an outer cortex). It forms a dull, pale greenish crust that can cover areas of up to 25 cm (10 in) across and is about 0.1 mm thick. It is surrounded by a white hyphal prothallus (a border of fungal threads), which also runs between thallus patches along cracks in the bark. The surface is densely covered with isidia. The isidia are pale yellowish green, short, cylindrical, and unbranched, about 0.2 × 0.1 mm. The medulla (inner layer) of both the thallus and isidia is pale yellow. The photobiont (algal partner) is trebouxioid. The ascomata are sessile (sitting directly on the surface), solitary, and constricted at the base. They are round to lobed, 0.4–1.5 mm wide and up to 0.5 mm high. The disc (central surface) is medium brown and flat to slightly convex. The whitish margin is barely raised above the disc, about 0.1 mm wide and bears small whitish papillae. In section, the excipulum is pale yellow and contains pockets of large hyaline crystals. The epihymenium is pale brown and the hypothecium is black. The hamathecium (tissue between the asci) is not inspersed (without scattered droplets). It turns blue with iodine (IKI+), mainly in the ascus tips. Asci are Porpidia-type. Ascospores are produced eight per ascus. The spores are hyaline, simple, ellipsoid, and measure 11–12.5 × 4.5–5.5 μm. They lack a surrounding gelatinous sheath. Pycnidia have not been observed. In standard spot tests, the thallus is negative in UV, C, KC, and P tests but reacts K+ (yellow). The yellow medulla also reacts K+, turning reddish. Thin-layer chromatography detected atranorin and several pigments, including chloroemodin, as the main lichen substances.

== Habitat and distribution ==
Malmidea densisidiata grows on tree bark in primary rainforest in the Reserva Cristalino region of Mato Grosso, Brazil, at about 250 and 350 m (820 and 1,150 ft) elevation. At the time of its original publication (2022), it had not been reported from outside Brazil. Within the type area it is locally common and represented by several additional collections. It has since been documented from Rondônia.
