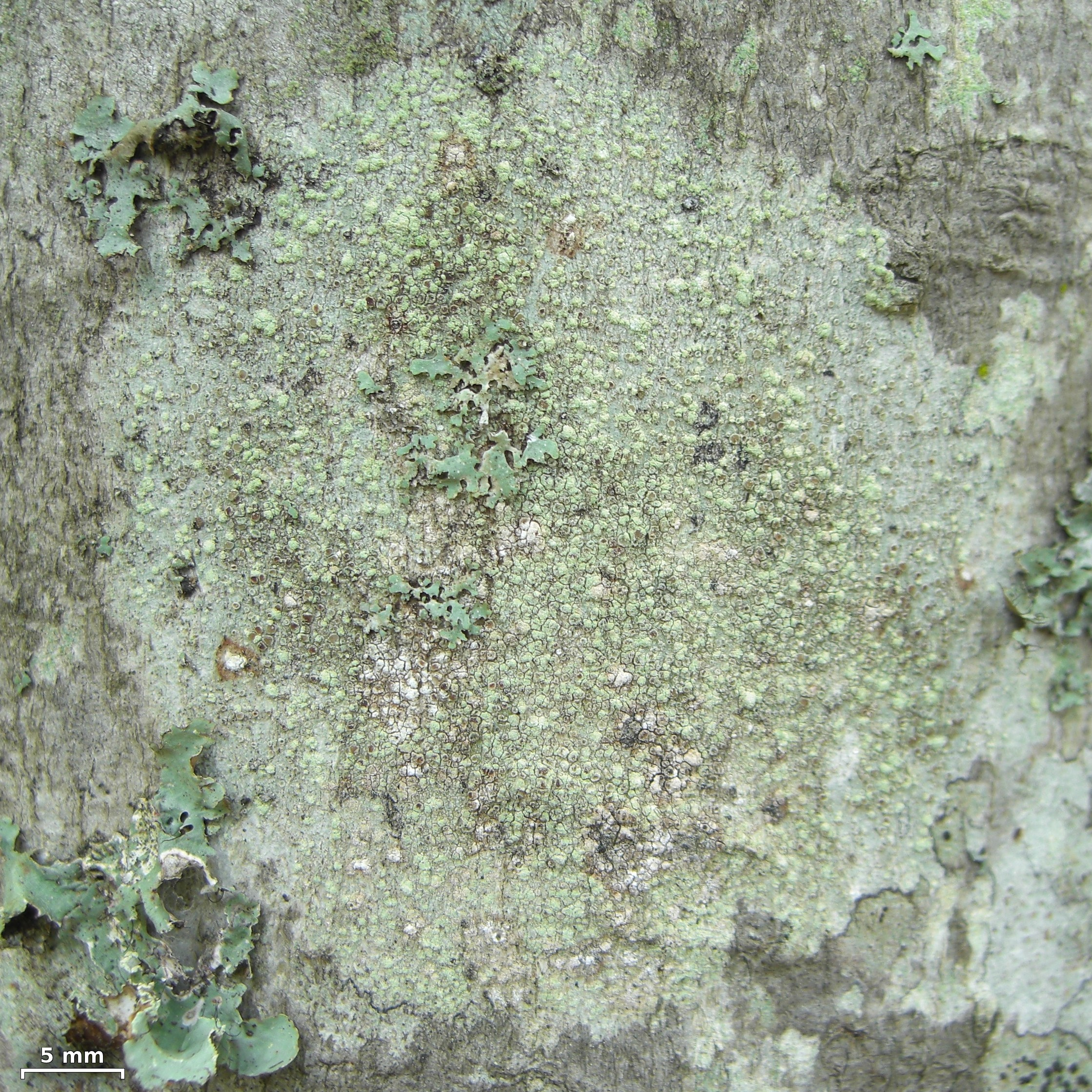
- in Haywood County, North Carolina, growing on the trunk of American beech. Scale bar is 5 mm (0.2 in)

Scientific classification
- Domain: Eukaryota
- Kingdom: Fungi
- Division: Ascomycota
- Class: Lecanoromycetes
- Order: Lecanorales
- Family: Lecanoraceae
- Genus: Vainionora
- Species: V. americana

Binomial name
- Vainionora americana Kalb, Tønsberg & Elix (2004)

= Vainionora americana =

Species of lichen

Vainionora americana is a species of crustose lichen in the family Lecanoraceae that is found in the United States. It was described as a species new to science in 2004 by the lichenologists Klaus Kalb, Tor Tønsberg, and John Alan Elix. The type was collected by Tønsberg from the southern Appalachian Mountains of North Carolina, where it was found growing on the bark of a maple tree. It was later recorded in Alabama.

Vainionora americana has a crustose thallus that is greenish-gray in color, and soralia that are relatively large and convex. It produces atranorin and two xanthones as secondary metabolites.
