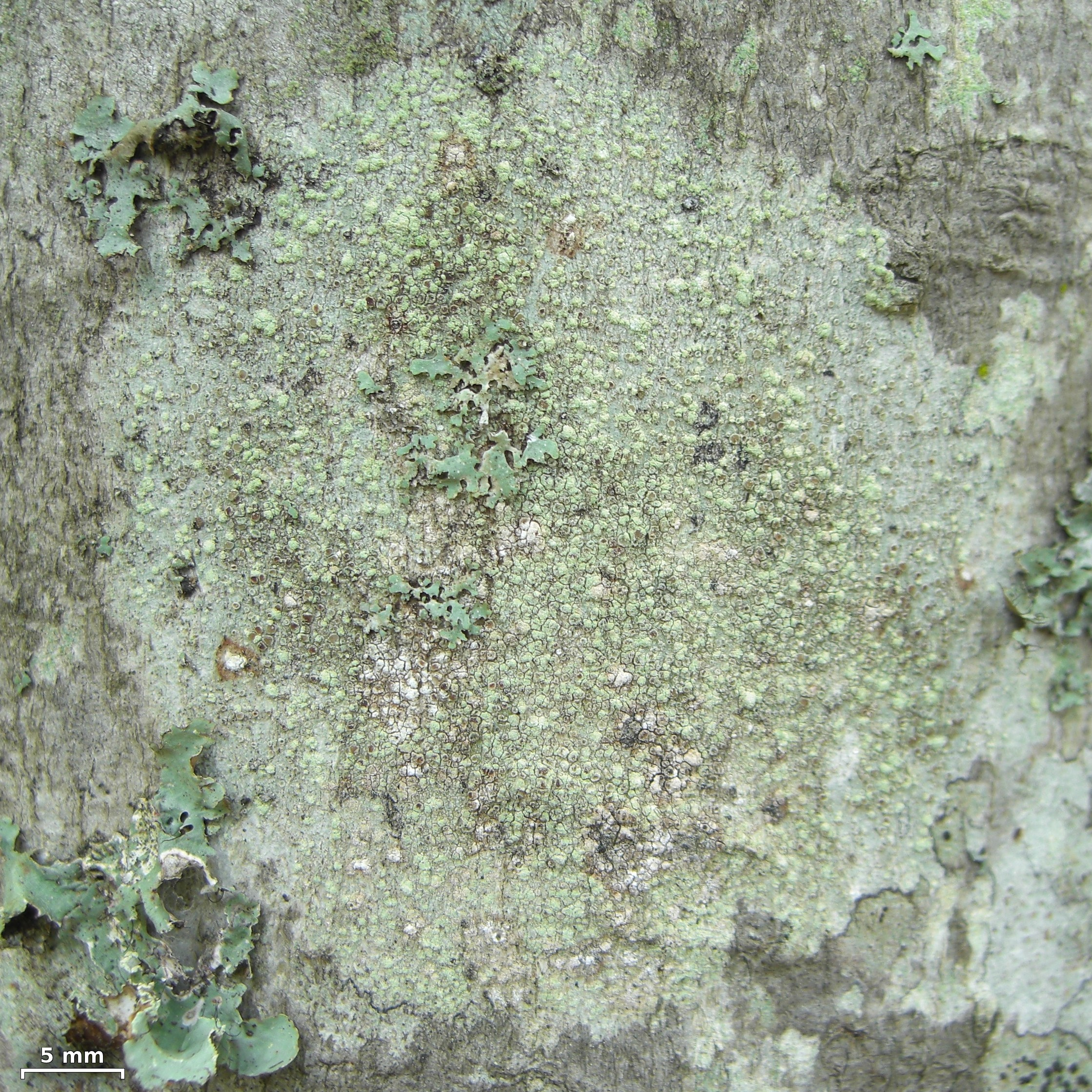
- Vainionora americana

Scientific classification
- Domain: Eukaryota
- Kingdom: Fungi
- Division: Ascomycota
- Class: Lecanoromycetes
- Order: Lecanorales
- Family: Lecanoraceae
- Genus: Vainionora; Kalb (1991)

Type species
- Vainionora pallidostraminea (Vain.) Kalb (1991)

= Vainionora =

Genus of lichen in the family Lecanoraceae

Vainionora is a genus of lichen in the family Lecanoraceae. The genus, which was circumscribed in 1991 by German lichenologist Klaus Kalb, honours the Finnish lichenologist Edvard Vainio, who described the type species as Lecanora pallidostraminea in 1890.

== Species ==
- Vainionora aemulans (Vain.) Kalb (1991)
- Vainionora americana Kalb, Tønsberg & Elix (2004)
- Vainionora flavidorufa (Hue) Papong & Lumbsch (2011)
- Vainionora flavovirens (Fée) Kalb (1991)
- Vainionora mexicana Kalb & Elix (2004)
- Vainionora nugrae Bungartz & Elix (2020)
- Vainionora pallidostraminea (Vain.) Kalb (1991)
- Vainionora stramineopallens (Vain.) Kalb (1991)
- Vainionora variabilis Kalb & Elix (2004)
- Vainionora warmingii (Müll.Arg.) Kalb (1991)
