= Malmidea sanguineostigma =

Scientific classification
- Kingdom: Fungi
- Division: Ascomycota
- Class: Lecanoromycetes
- Order: Lecanorales
- Family: Malmideaceae
- Genus: Malmidea
- Species: M. sanguineostigma

Binomial name
- Malmidea sanguineostigma Weerakoon & Aptroot (2013)
- Holotype: Knuckles Conservation Area, Sri Lanka

Species of lichen

Malmidea sanguineostigma is a species of crustose lichen in the family Malmideaceae. It is found in the Central Province of Sri Lanka.

== Taxonomy ==
Malmidea sanguineostigma was first described in 2013 by the lichenologists Gothamie Weerakoon and André Aptroot as part of their broader study on Sri Lankan lichens. This species closely resembles Malmidea chrysostigma, sharing the same habitat, but it differs in the presence of red anthraquinone pigment in the thallus medulla and the yellow pigment xantholepinone in the medulla of the apothecial excipulum. Additionally, M. sanguineostigma produces smaller ascospores.

The species epithet sanguineostigma alludes to the distinctive blood-red dots observed on its thallus.

== Description ==
The thallus of Malmidea sanguineostigma is thin, dull, and grey, featuring numerous hemispherical, corticate warts measuring 0.1–0.2 mm in diameter, each containing a bright red medullary pigment. These warts are typically rounded but occasionally flattened at the apex, without forming soralia. The photobiont partner consists of green algae cells about 7 by 5 μm.

Apothecia (fruiting bodies) are sessile, ranging from 0.4 to 0.8 mm in diameter, with a flat, smooth, medium-brown disc. The margins of the apothecia are slightly raised, dull, ochraceous to chamois-colored, and occasionally reveal pale yellow medullary tissue. Internally, the hymenium is hyaline (clear), measuring 45–55 μm high, with a pale brownish epihymenium layer (4–6 μm thick). The hypothecium below is hyaline to yellowish-brown, around 35–45 μm thick. Paraphyses (supporting hyphae in the hymenium) are unbranched and slender, about 1 μm wide.

The asci (spore-bearing structures) are cylindrical and contain eight hyaline, simple (non-septate) ascospores per ascus. Spores are ellipsoid with slightly pointed ends, measuring 10.5–12.5 by 5.5–6.5 μm. Pycnidia (asexual reproductive structures) have not been observed.

Chemical analysis of M. sanguineostigma revealed a UV-negative thallus with no reactions to standard chemical spot tests (C−, K−, KC−, P−), but its medulla shows a distinctive K+ blood-red reaction and fluoresces orange under UV. Thin-layer chromatography identified the presence of norsolorinic acid in the thallus medulla and xantholepinone pigment in the medulla of the excipulum.

== Habitat and distribution ==
At the time of its original publication, Malmidea sanguineostigma was known to occur only at its type locality in Sri Lanka. It was collected at an elevation of 1,437 m (4,715 ft) in the Knuckles Conservation Area, near Riverston Tower in the Central Province. Its habitat consists of smooth bark of trees (Elaeocarpus spp.) in primary montane forest.
