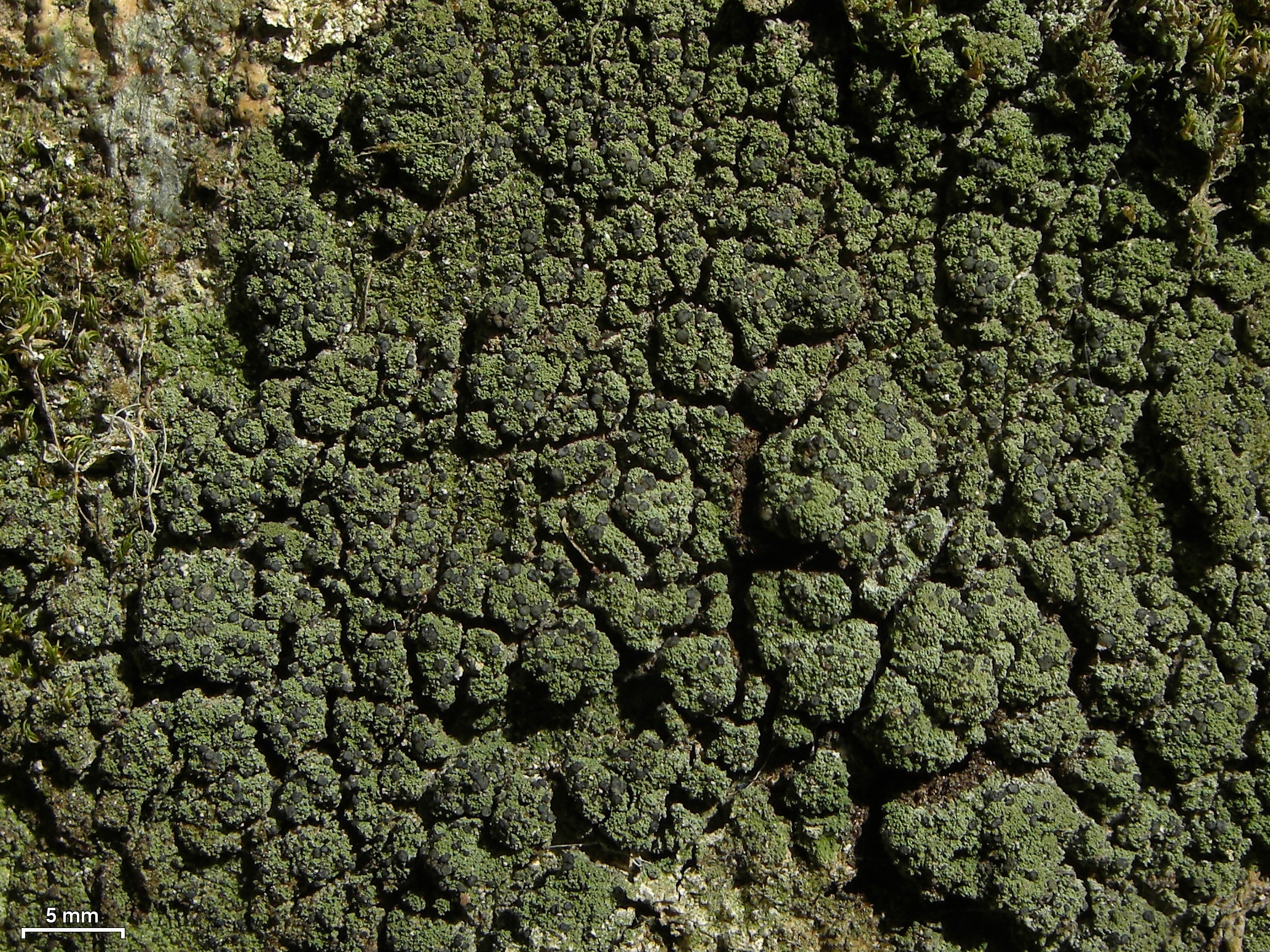

Scientific classification
- Kingdom: Fungi
- Division: Ascomycota
- Class: Lecanoromycetes
- Order: Lecanorales
- Family: Malmideaceae
- Genus: Malmidea
- Species: M. furfurosa

Binomial name
- Malmidea furfurosa (Tuck. ex Nyl.) Kalb & Lücking (2011)

Synonyms
- Lecidea furfurosa Tuck. ex Nyl. (1863); Biatora furfurosa (Tuck. ex Nyl.) Tuck. (1888); Malcolmiella furfurosa (Tuck. ex Nyl.) M.Cáceres & Lücking (2007)

= Malmidea furfurosa =

Species of lichen-forming fungus

Malmidea furfurosa is a species of lichen in the family Malmideaceae. First described from Cuban specimens in 1863, it forms a thin grey-granular thallus on bark. The species was moved to the newly established genus Malmidea in 2011 after genetic evidence showed it and related lichens represented a distinct evolutionary lineage.

== Taxonomy ==
Malmidea furfurosa was originally introduced by William Nylander in 1863 as Lecidea furfurosa, with Nylander explicitly attributing the name to Edward Tuckerman; hence the basionym is cited as "Tuck. ex Nyl.", which in botanical authorship means Tuckerman proposed the name but Nylander effected the valid publication.

In the protologue Nylander compared Tuckerman's taxon with Persoon's Lecidea furfuracea, and characterised L. furfurosa by a thin grey-granular bark-dwelling thallus composed of minute spherical granules on a dark to blackish hypothecium, medium (≈1 mm) flat, marginate apothecia with a blackish rim, and simple, colourless, ellipsoid-shaped ascospores (eight per ascus) about 12–18 μm long. He based the name on Tuckerman's material and cited Cuban collections by Charles Wright among the original material (a Cuban Wright gathering has been treated as type material in later work).

Klaus Kalb and Robert Lücking reclassified it in Malmidea in 2011. Kalb and colleagues showed that the tropical Lecidea piperis/Lecanora granifera assemblage, including the species long known as Lecidea furfurosa, forms a well-supported clade distinct from the type species of Malcolmiella; on that evidence they erected Malmidea for this lineage and made the new combination Malmidea furfurosa. The clade sits as sister to, but apart from, Ectolechiaceae and is set off by simple (one-celled), haloed spores, asci lacking a tubular tholus, and thalli often built of goniocysts, so the authors placed Malmidea in a new family, Malmideaceae.
