= Xanthoparmelia kalbii =

Scientific classification
- Domain: Eukaryota
- Kingdom: Fungi
- Division: Ascomycota
- Class: Lecanoromycetes
- Order: Lecanorales
- Family: Parmeliaceae
- Genus: Xanthoparmelia
- Species: X. kalbii

Binomial name
- Xanthoparmelia kalbii Hale (1984)

Species of lichen

Xanthoparmelia kalbii is a species of foliose lichen in the family Parmeliaceae. Found in Brazil, it was described as a species new to science in 1984 by American lichenologist Mason E. Hale. The type was collected in Catimbau National Park in Pernambuco. The specific epithet honours Klaus Kalb, "the first professional lichenologist to collect extensively in Brazil since G. A. Malme in the 1890s".

The lichen has a bright yellow-green thallus measuring 3–4 cm (1.2–1.6 in) in diameter that grows on rock. It contains usnic, hypostictic, and hyposalazinic acids as secondary chemicals.

== See also ==
- List of Xanthoparmelia species
