= Colégio Visconde de Porto Seguro =

Private school in São Paulo, Brazil

Coordinates: 23°36′22.35″S 46°43′14.37″W

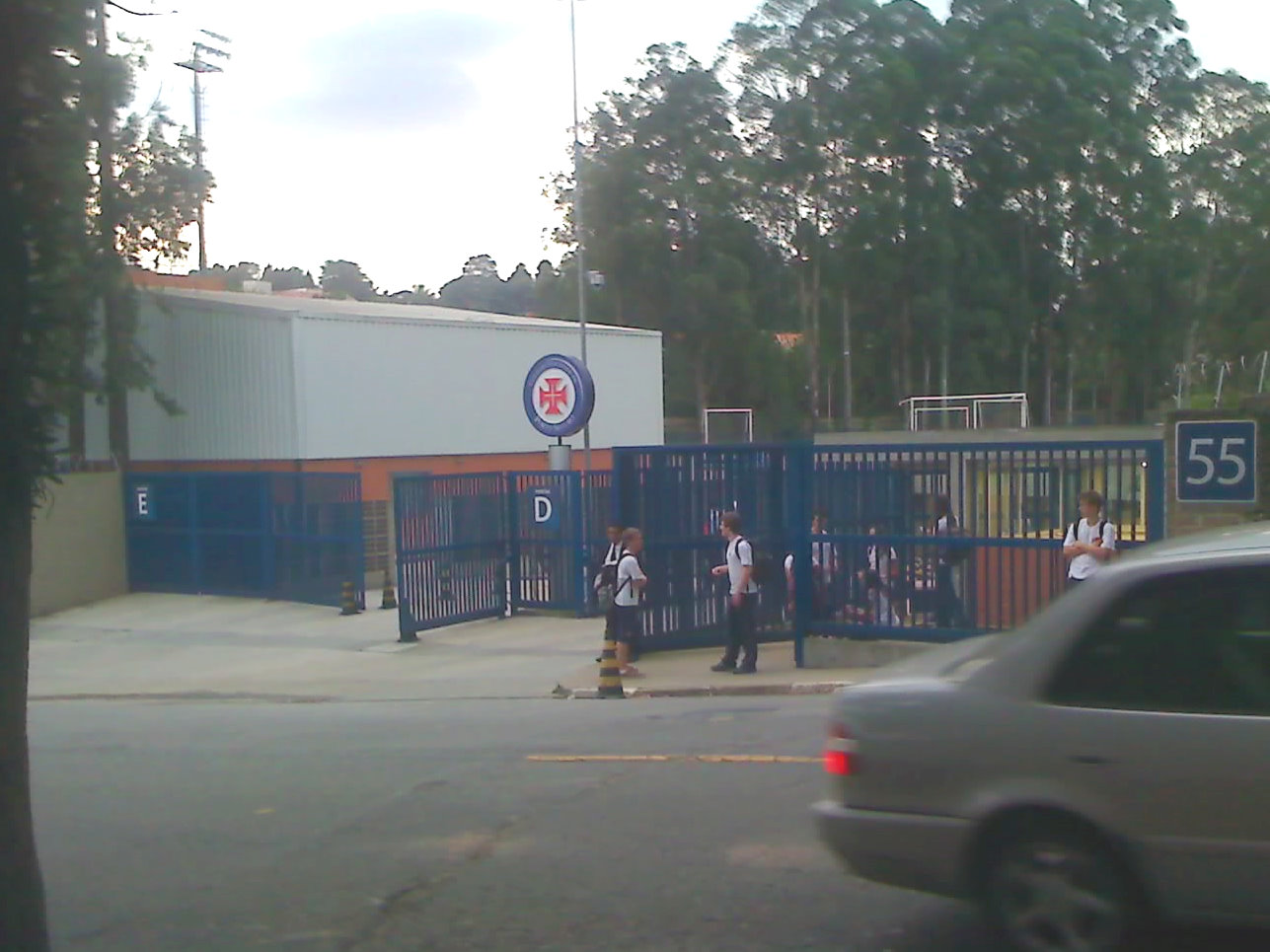
- Main entrance of the school, also called "Portão D" (Gate D)

Location
- Rua Floriano Peixoto Santos, 55; Sudeste Region; São Paulo, São Paulo state, 05658-080; Brazil

Information
- School type: Private school
- Established: January 7, 1879
- Founder: Karl Messenberg, Bernhard Staudigel, Victor Nothmann, Ludwig Bamberg and Emil Preiss
- Superintendent: Thomas Polisaitis
- President: Alfried K. Plöger
- Dean: Sonia Maria Bittencourt de Oliveira
- Principal: Maria Celina da S. Cattini
- Age: 4-5 to 17-18
- Enrollment: 4.280
- Language: Portuguese, German, English, Spanish
- Hours in school day: 12 hours
- Classrooms: ca. 90
- Campus size: 100.591 m^{2} (1,082.75 sq ft)
- Campus type: Urban
- Colours: White and navy blue
- Slogan: "Um só colégio em 6 unidades" (A 6-unity School)
- Song: Hino ao Colégio Visconde de Porto Seguro (Colégio Visconde de Porto Seguro’s Anthem)
- Athletics: Soccer, volleyball, basketball, handball, ping-pong, badminton, swimming, artistic gymnastics, athletics.
- Nickname: Porto (Seguro)
- Yearbook: Anuário
- Website: www.portoseguro.org.br

Colégio Visconde de Porto Seguro (often referred to as "Porto Seguro" or "CVPS", formerly named "Deutsche Schule" (German School)) is a private bilingual school located in the neighborhood of Morumbi, in São Paulo, Brazil. The school was founded in 1878 by German immigrants, who wished a school in which their children could learn about German culture, without losing the connection with Brazil. It was elected by Veja magazine as the best school of São Paulo. Nowadays, the school has several other related units. Its main unit had the 149th best national performance at the 2014 ENEM in a ranking of 15640; the Panamby unit was ranked at 236 and the Valinhos unit had the 67th best performance.

== History ==
The school was founded on September 22, 1878, as "Deutsche Schule", located in a rented building at Florêncio de Abreu Street, in downtown São Paulo. D. Pedro II visited the school in 1886. In 1913, the school moved to its own building at the Olinda Street, present day Praça Roosevelt. As the demand for school enrollment grew, two new units were built, one in Consolação, and the other in Barra Funda. In 1943, due to the Second World War, it changed its name to "Ginásio Brasileiro Alemão" (German-Brazilian Elementary School), and later to Colégio Visconde de Porto Seguro, after Francisco de Vahrnhagen, German-Brazilian historian.

In 1974, the school moved to its current location, in Morumbi, with its main entrance in Clementinne Brenne Street. Famous German musician Karl Richter was hired to direct the Colégio Porto Seguro Choir (Coral do Colégio Porto Seguro). Later on, in 1982, Karl Carstens, president of West Germany, became another notable visitor.

In 1982, the Valinhos branch was founded. Valinhos was, at the time, a major residence for German immigrants, who had come to work for companies located in the region. In 1997, the Panamby unit was founded in order to answer to the high demand for room at the original Morumbi branch. The inauguration of the new branch had the Vice Chancellor of Germany Joschka Fischer as a guest.

In 2003, when the institution celebrated its 125th anniversary, more than 46,000 people attended the celebration event that took place at the Estádio do Morumbi, located near the school. During the celebration, Brazilian singer Fafá de Belém sang the School's anthem.

In 2002, the first "Portinho" was founded, in front of the Panamby unit. In 2007, the second "Portinho", built inside Morumbi unit, was founded. This portinho was built where once has been one of the parking lots of the school. Nowadays, there's only one underground parking lot, with two floors.

Campuses in Sao Paulo City
Campuses in Valinhos
Colégio Visconde de Porto Seguro (São Paulo State)
Colégio Visconde de Porto Seguro (Brazil)
Main campuses in São Paulo State

== Academics ==
=== Subjects ===
From 1st to 4th grade, students have Portuguese, mathematics, sciences (mostly basic notions of biology and anatomy), history/geography, German (up to 2006, German was taught only from 3rd grade on), music, visual arts and physical education classes. On the 5th grade, history and geography are taught separately, music is no longer taught, English classes are introduced and plastic arts now teaches basic notions of geometry. On the 8th grade, Spanish classes are introduced. At high school, all subjects determined by the Brazilian Ministry of Education are taught: Portuguese, English, history, geography, mathematics, physics, chemistry and biology. German and Spanish are kept until 2nd grade, and plastic arts/geometry is taught up to 1st grade. Also, at 3rd grade, Portuguese is divided into Portuguese (grammar and literature) and Composition (because many universities require a composition for admission at their vestibulares), and the "Atualidades", a subject in which main events taking place during the time the class is given are discussed, was introduced in 2008.

== Curricula ==
There are two curricula (or Zugs, in German): A (Brazilian curriculum) and B (German curriculum). Sometimes the C curriculum (see below) is also considered.

=== A curriculum (currículo A; A-Zug) ===
The Brazilian curriculum follows the same system explained above.

=== B curriculum (currículo B; B-Zug) ===
B curriculum has a more German-oriented system. Therefore, most of its students are German Brazilian. Apart from the normal classes the A curriculum have, they have also study History, Mathematics, Physics, Chemistry, Biology, Arts, Music, English, Spanish (facultative), French (facultative and paid), PE (for the 1st to 4th grade plus abitur) and German classes taught in German (Geschichte, Mathematik, Physik, Chemie, Biologie, Kunst, Musik, Englisch, Spanisch, Fanzösisch, Sport and Deutsch respectively). Classes are often smaller (containing around 20 students, in opposition to the normal 35 students of A curriculum classes), and students take the classes in the morning, along with the remaining morning students. B alumni also have the opportunity for taking the Abitur exams in the school.

=== C curriculum (currículo C; C-Zug) ===
The C curriculum offers free classes for students from the Paraisópolis favela, located near the school. Those classes are taken in the afternoon, together with the afternoon students. All books, notebooks, clothes and food are provided free.

== Other units ==
Apart from the Colégio Visconde de Porto Seguro Unidade I, which is the first and main unit, there are also other units, such as:

- Colégio Visconde de Porto Seguro Unidade II, in Valinhos
- Colégio Visconde de Porto Seguro Unidade III, at Panamby, a borough of São Paulo (this unit does not have the B curriculum).

There are also the "Portinhos" (literally Little Portos), which work much like a day care.

- Portinho Panamby
- Portinho Morumbi, located inside the Colégio Visconde de Porto Seguro Unidade I
- Portinho Valinhos, located inside the Colégio Visconde de Porto Seguro Unidade II

All units together have about 10,500 students and 550 teachers.

== See also ==
- German Brazilian

== Notable alumni ==
- Robert Scheidt – Sailor
- Queen Silvia of Sweden
- Thaissa Presti - Track and field sprint athlete
- Rodrigo Hübner Mendes - Young Global Leader
