= Malmidea coralliformis =

Scientific classification
- Kingdom: Fungi
- Division: Ascomycota
- Class: Lecanoromycetes
- Order: Lecanorales
- Family: Malmideaceae
- Genus: Malmidea
- Species: M. coralliformis

Binomial name
- Malmidea coralliformis Kalb (2011)
- Holotype: Doi Suthep–Pui National Park, Chiang Mai province, Thailand

Species of lichen

Malmidea coralliformis is a corticolous (bark-dwelling), crustose lichen in the family Malmideaceae. It was described in 2011 from northern Thailand. The species has a densely warted thallus with coral-like branching warts and ascospores that lack septa and are halonate. It resembles M. aurigera but lacks atranorin and tends to have larger spores.

== Taxonomy ==
The species was introduced as Malmidea coralliformis by Klaus Kalb in 2011 as part of a study establishing Malmidea and its family Malmideaceae. The holotype was collected in Thailand, Chiang Mai province, Doi Suthep–Pui National Park at about 700 m elevation, in a humid Dipterocarpus forest. The epithet coralliformis refers to the conspicuous, partly ramified, coral-like warts on the thallus.

== Description ==
The thallus forms a thin, crust-like growth (about 50–70 μm thick) on bark and is densely warted (verrucose), with individual warts about 0.2–0.3 mm high and 0.1–0.3 mm wide that often coalesce and branch; soredia and isidia are absent. The medulla is whitish and reacts K+ (orange). Apothecia (the spore-producing discs) are sessile, rounded and 0.7–1.1 mm in diameter; the disc is brown to dark grey-brown with a thin, biatorine margin of the granifera type. The rim tissue (proper exciple) is hyaline peripherally and internally shows a medullary layer of loosely arranged, periclinally arranged hyphae bearing hydrophobic granules that partly dissolve in potassium hydroxide solution with a greenish-yellow reaction. The subhymenium is brown, the hypothecium (tissue beneath the hymenium) is blackish-brown and K–, and the hymenium is 75–100 μm high. Asci are 60–70 × 13–15 μm. Ascospores number 6–8 per ascus, are colourless, ellipsoid, non-septate and halonate, measuring 10–17 × 6–10 μm. The authors report several unknown xantholepinones as the detectable chemistry and note the absence of atranorin.

== Habitat and distribution ==
The species is known from northern Thailand (Chiang Mai province), where it grows on tree bark in humid evergreen Dipterocarpus forest around 700 m elevation. The original material was collected along the trail to Monthanthan waterfall in Doi Suthep–Pui National Park.
