= Malcolmiella =

Scientific classification
- Domain: Eukaryota
- Kingdom: Fungi
- Division: Ascomycota
- Class: Lecanoromycetes
- Order: Lecanorales
- Family: Pilocarpaceae
- Genus: Malcolmiella; Vězda (1997)

Type species
- Malcolmiella cinereovirens Vězda (1997)

Species
- M. cinereovirens M. interversa

Genus of lichens

Malcolmiella is a genus of lichenized fungi in the family Pilocarpaceae.

== Taxonomy ==
The genus was circumscribed by Czech lichenologist Antonín Vězda 1997, with Malcolmiella cinereovirens as the type, and only species. The generic name honours William McLagan Malcolm (born 1936), a New Zealand-born American botanist and botanical illustrator who specialised in cryptogams. M. interversa was added as a second species in 2021 (transferred from genus Lecidea).
