= Cerro El Volcán =

Mountain in Caracas metropolitan area, Venezuela

Coordinates: 9°54′N 66°45′W

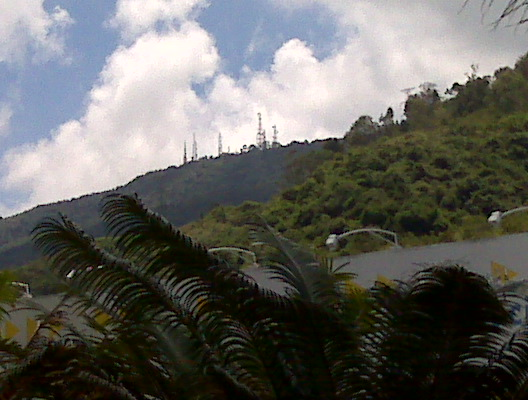
Picacho de El Volcán, the tallest peak in El Hatillo.

Cerro El Volcán (sometimes written as "El Picacho Volcano") is the highest peak in El Hatillo Municipality, which is part of the metropolitan area of the Metropolitan District of Caracas in northern Venezuela, South America. It lies west of the state of Miranda. On April 24, 1980, Cerro El Volcán was declared a Protected Area, and, as of 2013, the peak was managed by the Ministry of Popular Power for the Environment, as published in Official Gazette No. 2606-E.
