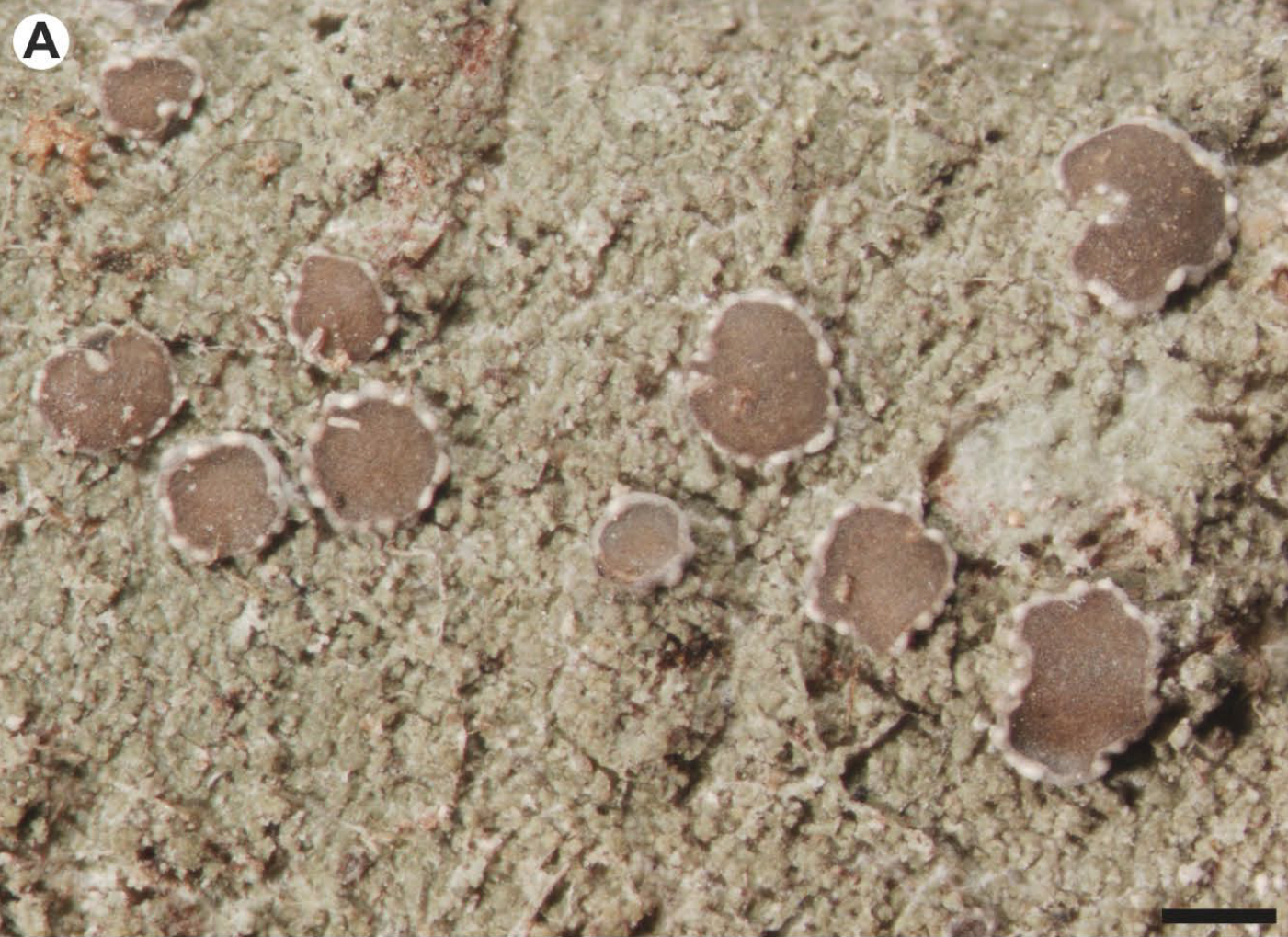
- Holotype specimen, showing apothecia with a distinct verrucose (warty) margin; scale bar is 0.5 mm

Scientific classification
- Domain: Eukaryota
- Kingdom: Fungi
- Division: Ascomycota
- Class: Lecanoromycetes
- Order: Lecanorales
- Family: Malmideaceae
- Genus: Malmidea
- Species: M. attenboroughii

Binomial name
- Malmidea attenboroughii Kukwa, Guzow-Krzemińska, Kosecka, Jabłońska & Flakus (2019)

= Malmidea attenboroughii =

Species of lichen

Malmidea attenboroughii is a species of corticolous (bark-dwelling), crustose lichen in the family Malmideaceae. It is known to occur from a single location in the Amazon rainforest of Bolivia.

== Taxonomy ==
The lichen was formally described in 2019 by Martin Kukwa, Beata Guzow-Krzemińska, Magdalena Kosecka, Agnieska Jabłońska, and Adam Flakus. The type specimen was collected from the Jardín Botánico La Paz in the Higher University of San Andrés (Abel Iturralde, La Paz) at an elevation of 400 m (1,300 ft). It is only known to occur at the type locality, where the habitat is pre-Andean Amazon rainforest. The species epithet honours English broadcaster and naturalist Sir David Attenborough, "for his major contributions to the popularization of knowledge about biodiversity and nature protection".

== Description ==
The lichen has a dull greenish-grey, crustose thallus that is up to 0.2 mm thick. Its surface texture is described as "minutely verrucose" (covered with small pimples) to "granulose-isidiate" (covered in tiny elongated granule-like thallus outgrowths that resemble isidia); the individual granules are 50–125 μm in diameter. The thallus is surrounded by a thin, white, fibrous prothallus. The apothecia are rounded to irregular in outline, measuring up to 1.0 mm in diameter, with a flat flesh-coloured to brown disc. The margin of the apothecia (the excipulum) is thin, cream-coloured to dark grey-brown, and either smooth or verrucose (warty) due to the presence of internal chambers in the internal medulla. There are eight ascospores in each ascus. The spores have an ellipsoidal shape and dimensions of 12–16 by 7.5–9 μm. An unknown yellow pigment is present as crystals in the medulla.

== See also ==
- List of things named after David Attenborough and his works
