= Klaus Kalb =

German lichenologist

- Born: 1942 (age 83–84); Nuremberg, Germany
- Education: University of Erlangen–Nuremberg
- Scientific career
- Fields: Lichenology
- Workplaces: Colégio Visconde de Porto Seguro; University of Regensburg

Klaus Kalb (born 1942) is a German lichenologist and an authority on tropical lichens. Born in Nuremberg, he studied at the University of Erlangen–Nuremberg before pursuing a career that significantly advanced the field of lichenology, particularly in Brazil. Kalb's work in São Paulo from 1978 to 1981 led to a collaboration with Brazilian lichenologist Marcelo Pinto Marcelli, which is considered a model for non-commercial benefit-sharing in taxonomic research. He later became an associate professor at the University of Regensburg and is known for editing the exsiccata series Lichenes Neotropici. Kalb's contributions to lichenology include over 120 scientific publications, the description of numerous new species, and the development of a substantial lichen collection. His work has been recognised through various honours, including four lichen genera and numerous species named after him, as well as a Festschrift published in 2007 to mark his retirement.

== Biography ==
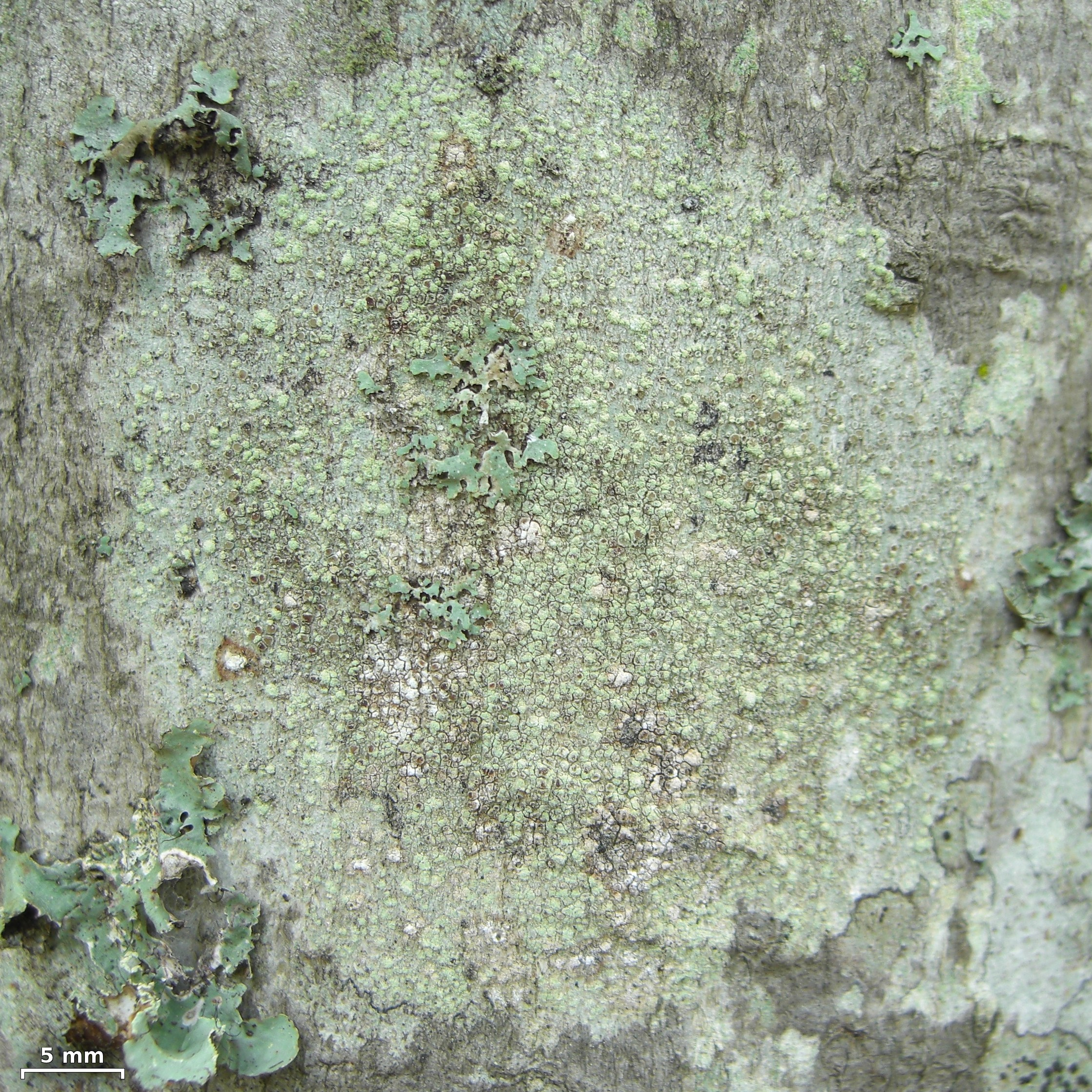
Vainionora americana was described as a new species by Kalb and colleagues in 2004.

Klaus Kalb was born in Nuremberg in 1942 and grew up in southern Bavaria. From 1960 to 1965 he studied biology, chemistry, and geography at the University of Erlangen–Nuremberg. Kalb was greatly interested in lichens and decided to pursue a doctoral degree; his thesis work was about lichen communities in the Ötztal Alps.

From 1978 to 1981, Kalb was a teacher at the Colégio Visconde de Porto Seguro in São Paulo, Brazil. This position afforded him the opportunity to initiate research into tropical lichens. During this period, Kalb made significant contributions to the field of lichenology in Brazil through his collaboration with Brazilian lichenologist Marcelo Pinto Marcelli. Kalb provided three years of intensive training to Marcelli and later assisted him in completing his PhD thesis in 1987. This collaboration is considered an outstanding example of non-commercial benefit-sharing in taxonomic research, laying the foundation for modern lichenology in Brazil.

Kalb earned his habilitation from the University of Regensburg in 1989, becoming an associate professor with that institution. He is editing the exsiccata series Lichenes Neotropici, starting with 2017 together with André Aptroot.

Kalb's approach to collaboration and mentorship has been praised for embodying the spirit of the Convention on Biological Diversity (CBD) and the Nagoya Protocol, more than a decade before the CBD was established. His work with Brazilian lichenologists has led to the training of multiple generations of researchers in the field.

In 2014, the University of Wisconsin herbarium purchased Kalb's lichen collection of 60,000 specimens for $75,000. With the acquisition of Kalb's collection, rich in tropical and European specimens, the herbarium houses about 70% of the world's known lichen taxa.

== Recognition ==
In 2007, on the occasion of his retirement, Kalb was honoured with a Festschrift, featuring 24 scientific papers written by 51 authors. The Festschrift included a publication list, a list of taxa described by him and of taxa named after him.

=== Eponyms ===
Four lichen genera have been named in honour of Kalb: Kalbiana Henssen (1988); Kalbographa Lücking (2007); Kalbionora Sodamuk, S.D.Leav. & Lumbsch (2017); and Klauskalbia S.Y.Kondr., Lőkös, E.Farkas & Hur (2021).

Many species have also been named to honour Kalb. These include: Acanthothecis kalbii Dal-Forno & Eliasaro (2009); Acanthotrema kalbii Lücking (2012); Astrochapsa kalbii Poengs., Lücking & Lumbsch (2014); Byssoloma kalbii Sérus. (1996) Caloplaca kalbiorum S.Y.Kondr. & Kärnefelt (2007); Chaenothecopsis kalbii Tibell & K.Ryman (1995) Chapsa kalbii Frisch (2006); Cladina kalbii Ahti (2000); Coenogonium kalbii Aptroot, Lücking & L.Umaña (2006); Compsocladium kalbii Frisch (2007); Enterographa kalbii Sparrius (2004); Gyalideopsis kalbii Vězda (1983); Heterodermia kalbii M.F.N.Martins & Marcelli (2007); Hypotrachyna kalbii Elix, T.H.Nash & Sipman (2009); Hypotrachyna klauskalbii A.Fletcher ex Sipman, Elix & T.H.Nash (2009); Lecanora kalbiana Lumbsch (1996); Lecanora klauskalbii Sipman (2007); Lecidea kalbii Hertel (1984); Leptogium kalbii Marcelli & I.P.R.Cunha (2007); Megalospora kalbii Sipman (1983); Musaespora kalbii Lücking & Sérus. (1996); Ocellularia kalbii Mangold, Elix & Lumbsch (2007); Opegrapha blakii Ertz & Diederich (2004); Opegrapha kalbii Matzer (1996); Pertusaria kalbii A.W.Archer & Messuti (1998); Phaeographis kalbii Staiger (2002); Phyllopsora kalbii Brako (1991); Physcia kalbii Moberg (1990); Piccolia kalbii Van den Broeck & Ertz (2013); Pseudocyphellaria kalbi D.J.Galloway (1993); Pseudoparmelia kalbiana Elix & T.H.Nash (1998); Rinodina kalbii Giralt & Matzer (1994); Roselliniella kalbii Hafellner (1985); Trichothelium kalbii Lücking (2004); Usnea kalbiana A.Gerlach & P.Clerc (2017); Xanthoparmelia kalbii Hale (1984); Xanthoparmelia klauskalbii Elix (2007); Xanthoparmelia neokalbii T.H.Nash & Elix (1995); and Lecanora kalbii Bungartz & Elix (2020).

== Selected publications ==
As of 2012, Kalb had about 120 scientific publications, particularly on tropical lichens. Some of his major works include:

- Kalb, Klaus (1970). Flechtengesellschaften der vorderen Ötztaler Alpen. Dissertationes botanicae. Vol. 9. Nuremberg: University of Erlangen; Lehre Cramer.
- Kalb, Klaus (1987). Brasilianische Flechten: 1. Die Gattung Pyxine. Bibliotheca Lichenologica (in German). Vol. 24. J. Cramer. pp. 1–89. ISBN 978-3-443-58003-2.
- Kalb, Klaus; Vězda, Antonín (1988). Neue oder bemerkenswerte Arten der Flechtenfamilie Gomphillaceae in der Neotropis (in German). Vol. 29. pp. 1–112. ISBN 978-3-443-58008-7.
- Stariger, Bettina; Kalb, Klaus (1995). Haematomma-Studien Pts. I and II: Die Flechtengattung Haematomma: Lichenicole Pilze Auf Arten Der Flechtengattung Haematomma. Bibliotheca Lichenologica (in German). Vol. 59. pp. 1–228. ISBN 978-3-443-58038-4.
- Frisch, Andreas; Kalb, Klaus; Grube, Martin (2006). Contributions towards a new systematics of the lichen family Thelotremataceae. I. The lichen family Thelotremataceae in Africa. II. A monograph of Thelotremataceae with a complex structure of the columnella. III. Molecular phylogeny of the Thelotremataceae. Vol. 92. pp. 1–556. ISBN 978-3-443-58071-1.
- Mongkolsuk, Pachara; Meesim, Sanya; Poengsungnoen, Vasun; Buaruang, Kawinnat; Schumm, Felix; Kalb, Klaus (2015). "The lichen family Physciaceae in Thailand—II. Contributions to the genus Heterodermia sensu lato". Phytotaxa. 235 (1): 1–66. doi:10.11646/phytotaxa.235.1.1.

== See also ==
- Category:Taxa named by Klaus Kalb
