= List of Ocellularia species =

This is a list of species in the crustose lichen genus Ocellularia. As of April 2026, Species Fungorum accepts 358 species of Ocellularia.

== A ==
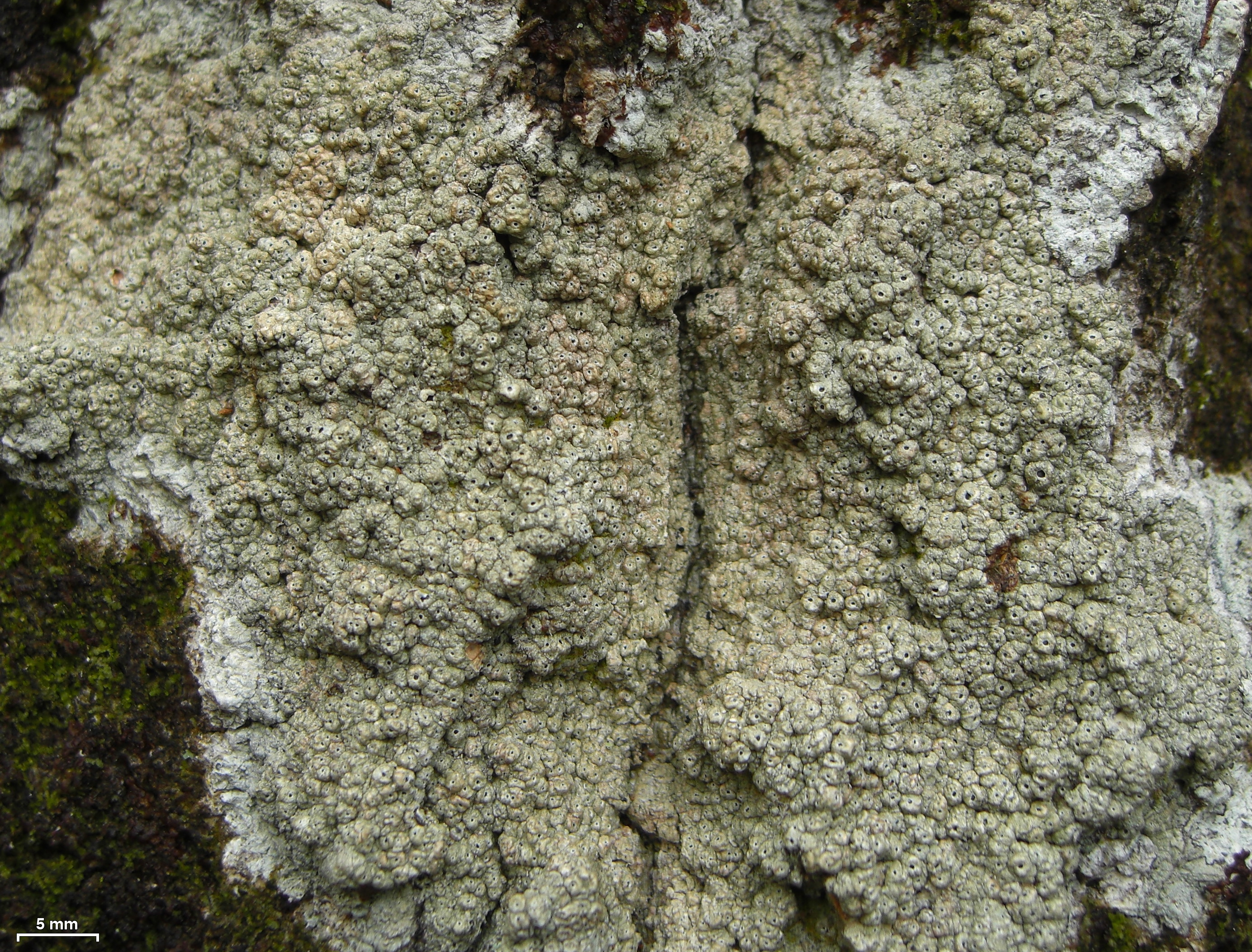
Ocellularia americana

- Ocellularia abbayesiana Lücking (2014)
- Ocellularia africana Frisch (2006)
- Ocellularia agasthiensis Nagarkar, Sethy & Patw. (1988) – India
- Ocellularia alba (Fée) Müll.Arg. (1887)
- Ocellularia albobullata Lücking, Sipman & Grube (2011)
- Ocellularia albocincta (Hale) Divakar & Mangold (2010)
- Ocellularia albocincta Liu, S.-H.Jiang & Lücking (2025) – China
- Ocellularia albocolumellata Lücking, Lumbsch & Parnmen (2014) – New Caledonia
- Ocellularia albogilva (Kremp.) Zahlbr. (1923)
- Ocellularia albomaculata Hale (1981)
- Ocellularia albothallina Lücking, Lumbsch & Parnmen (2014) – New Caledonia
- Ocellularia albula (Nyl.) Zahlbr. (1923)
- Ocellularia allospora (Nyl.) Zahlbr. (1923)
- Ocellularia allosporiza (Nyl.) Zahlbr. (1923)
- Ocellularia americana Hale (1973)
- Ocellularia andamanica (Nyl.) Tat. Matsumoto & Deguchi (1999)
- Ocellularia annuloelevata (Nagarkar, Sethy & Patw.) S.Joshi & Upreti (2018) – India
- Ocellularia antillensis Hale (1974)
- Ocellularia apayoensis (Vain.) Zahlbr. (1923)
- Ocellularia aptrootiana Weerakoon, Lücking & Lumbsch (2014) – Sri Lanka
- Ocellularia arachchigei Weerakoon, Lücking & Lumbsch (2016)
- Ocellularia arecae (Vain.) Hale (1980)
- Ocellularia areolata Lücking, B.Moncada & Álvaro (2023) – Colombia
- Ocellularia ascidioidea Hale (1981)
- Ocellularia auberianoides (Nyl.) Müll.Arg. (1891)
- Ocellularia auratipruinosa Breuss (2000) – Costa Rica
- Ocellularia aurulenta Hale (1974)
- Ocellularia australiana Mangold, Lücking & Lumbsch (2014)
- Ocellularia austroafricana (Frisch) Mangold & Lumbsch (2009)
- Ocellularia austropacifica Lücking, Lumbsch & Parnmen (2014)

== B ==
- Ocellularia bahiana (Ach.) Frisch (2006)
- Ocellularia baileyi Müll.Arg. (1891)
- Ocellularia balangoda Weerakoon, Lücking & Lumbsch (2014) – Sri Lanka
- Ocellularia baorucensis Lücking (2015)
- Ocellularia bataana (Vain.) Zahlbr. (1923)
- Ocellularia bipindensis Frisch (2006)
- Ocellularia bonplandii (Fée) Müll.Arg. (1882)
- Ocellularia brasiliensis M.Cáceres, Aptroot & Lücking (2014) – Brazil
- Ocellularia brunneospora Homchant. & Coppins (2002) – Thailand
- Ocellularia buckii Lücking (2015)
- Ocellularia bullata Hale (1978)

== C ==
- Ocellularia caledoniensis (Hale) Hale (1980)
- Ocellularia cameroonensis Frisch (2006)
- Ocellularia canara Nagarkar, Sethy & Patw. (1988) – India
- Ocellularia canariana Patw., Sethy & Nagarkar (1986) – India
- Ocellularia capensis Zahlbr. (1932) – Africa
- Ocellularia caquetensis Lücking, B.Moncada & Álvaro (2023) – Colombia
- Ocellularia caraibica Lücking (2015)
- Ocellularia carassensis (Vain.) Sipman (2012)
- Ocellularia carnosula (Kremp.) Zahlbr. (1923)
- Ocellularia cavata (Ach.) Müll.Arg. (1882)
- Ocellularia cerebriformis Papong, Lücking & Lumbsch (2014) – Thailand
- Ocellularia chiriquiensis (Hale) Hale (1980)
- Ocellularia chonestoma (Leight.) Zahlbr. (1923)
- Ocellularia cicra Rivas Plata & Lücking (2012) – Peru
- Ocellularia cinerascens Abbayes (1955)
- Ocellularia cinerea (Müll.Arg.) Kraichak, Lücking & Lumbsch (2014)
- Ocellularia circumscripta (C.Knight) C.W.Dodge (1970)
- Ocellularia citrina Liu, S.-H.Jiang & Lücking (2025) – China
- Ocellularia cloonanii Weerakoon, Lücking & Lumbsch (2014) – Sri Lanka
- Ocellularia cocosensis Lücking (2012)
- Ocellularia collativa (Kremp.) Zahlbr. (1923)
- Ocellularia comayaguana Lücking (2015)
- Ocellularia comparabilis (Kremp.) Müll.Arg. (1883)
- Ocellularia concentrica (Stirt.) Sherwood (1987)
- Ocellularia concolor Meyen & Flot. (1843)
- Ocellularia conferta (Nyl.) C.W.Dodge (1965)
- Ocellularia confluens (Kremp.) Zahlbr. (1923)
- Ocellularia conformalis (Kremp.) M.Cáceres & Lücking (2012)
- Ocellularia conformis (Fée) Hale (1980)
- Ocellularia confundita Sutjar. & Kalb (2015) – Thailand
- Ocellularia confusa (Hale) Hale (1980)
- Ocellularia conpsoromica Hale (1973)
- Ocellularia coronata Lücking & Pérez-Ort. (2015) – Cuba
- Ocellularia craterella (Nagarkar & Hale) Mangold & Lücking (2016)
- Ocellularia crocea (Kremp.) Overeem & D.Overeem (1922)
- Ocellularia croceoisidiata Sipman (1992) – Venezuela
- Ocellularia cryptica Lücking (2012)
- Ocellularia curranii (Vain.) Kraichak, Lücking & Lumbsch (2014)

== D ==
- Ocellularia daniana Lücking (2015)
- Ocellularia decolorata Hale (1978)
- Ocellularia deformis Nagarkar & Hale (1989)
- Ocellularia diacida Hale (1978)
- Ocellularia diffractella Müll.Arg. (1891)
- Ocellularia diminuta M.Cáceres, Aptroot & Lücking (2014) – Brazil
- Ocellularia diospyri Homchant. & Coppins (2002) – Thailand
- Ocellularia diplotrema (Nyl.) Zahlbr. (1923)
- Ocellularia discoidea (Ach.) Müll.Arg. (1887)
- Ocellularia dodecamera (Nyl.) R.N.Peláez, B.Moncada & Lücking (2014) – Colombia
- Ocellularia dolichotata (Nyl.) Zahlbr. (1923)
- Ocellularia domingensis (Fée ex Nyl.) Müll.Arg. (1887)
- Ocellularia dominicana Hale (1974)
- Ocellularia dussii Lücking (2015)

== E ==
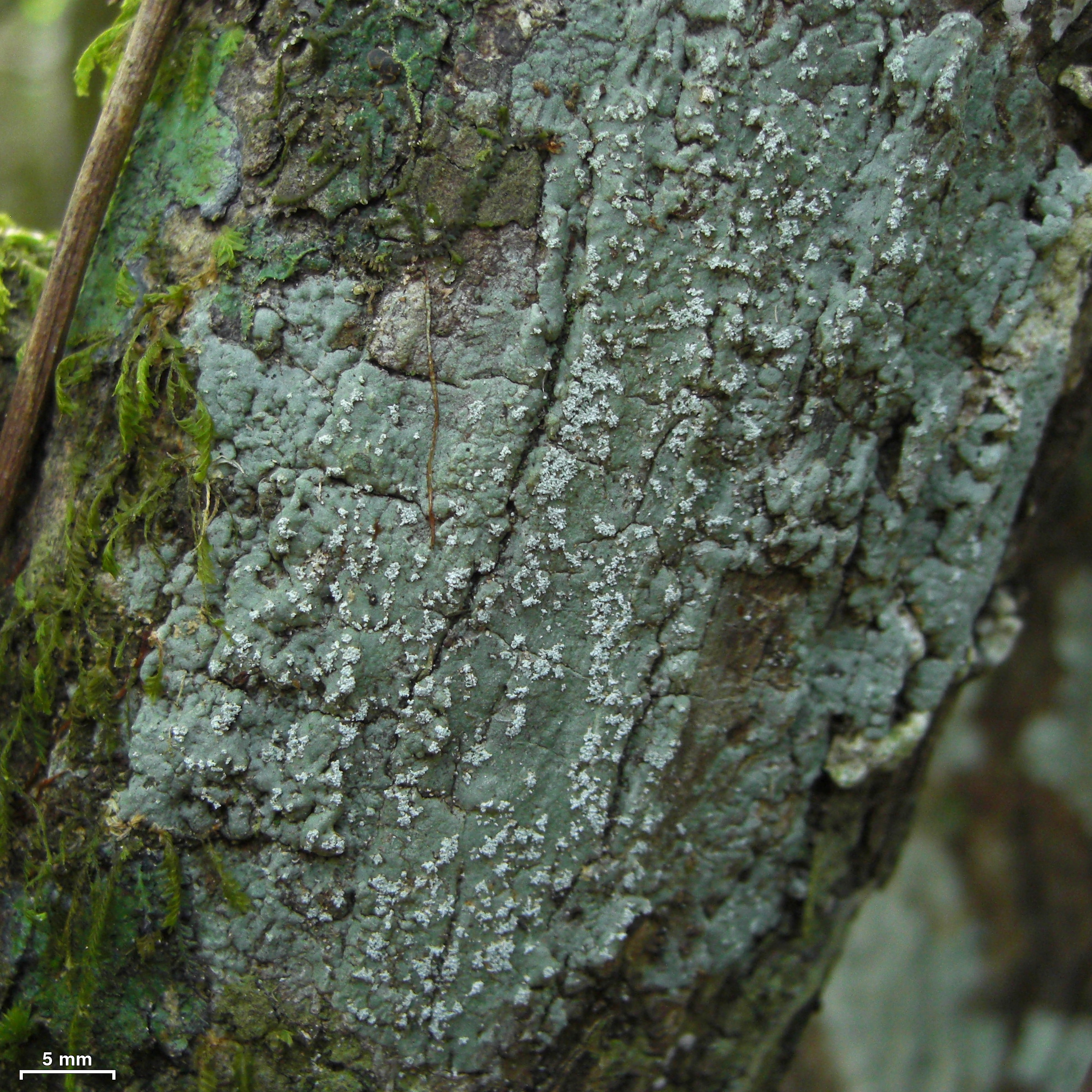
Ocellularia erodens

- Ocellularia ecolumellata Mangold (2009)
- Ocellularia elixii Sutjar. & Kalb (2015) – Thailand
- Ocellularia emergens (Vain.) Zahlbr. (1923)
- Ocellularia endoleuca Müll.Arg. (1895)
- Ocellularia endoperidermica Lücking (2015)
- Ocellularia epitrypa (Nyl.) Hale (1980)
- Ocellularia erodens (R.C.Harris) Kraichak, Lücking & Lumbsch (2014)
- Ocellularia etayoi van den Boom & Sipman (2017) – Panama
- Ocellularia eumorpha (Stirt.) Hale (1980)
- Ocellularia eumorphoides Frisch (2006)
- Ocellularia eurychades (Kremp.) Nagarkar & Hale (1989)
- Ocellularia exigua Müll.Arg. (1892)
- Ocellularia extendens (Nagarkar & Hale) Lücking (2016)

== F ==
- Ocellularia fecunda (Vain.) Hale (1974)
- Ocellularia fenestrata Rivas Plata & Lücking (2012) – Peru
- Ocellularia flavescens Homchant. & Coppins (2002) – Thailand
- Ocellularia flavida Hale (1974)
- Ocellularia flavisorediata Frisch (2006)
- Ocellularia flavomedullosa Nagarkar & Hale (1989)
- Ocellularia flavoperforata Lücking (2012)
- Ocellularia flavoradiata Aptroot, Lücking & M.Cáceres (2023) – Brazil
- Ocellularia flavostroma M.Cáceres, Aptroot & Lücking (2014) – Brazil
- Ocellularia fuscolichexanthonica Aptroot (2023) – Brazil
- Ocellularia fuscosporella Lücking, Lumbsch & Parnmen (2014) – New Caledonia

== G ==
- Ocellularia garoana Patw. & Nagarkar (1980)
- Ocellularia gentingensis Nagarkar & Hale (1989)
- Ocellularia gerardoi Sipman (2012)
- Ocellularia gibberulosa (Müll.Arg.) Mangold (2009)
- Ocellularia gigantospora Rivas Plata, Sipman & Lücking (2014) – Philippines
- Ocellularia glaziovii Müll.Arg. (1895)
- Ocellularia globifera Kalb & Lücking (2012)
- Ocellularia globosa Hale (1974)
- Ocellularia goniostoma Müll.Arg. (1891)
- Ocellularia gracilis Müll.Arg. (1881)
- Ocellularia grandis (Hale) Hale (1980)
- Ocellularia granpiedrensis Lücking (2015)
- Ocellularia grantii Lücking (2014)
- Ocellularia granulatula (Nyl.) Zahlbr. (1923)
- Ocellularia granulifera (Kremp.) Müll.Arg. (1892)
- Ocellularia groenhartii Hale (1975)
- Ocellularia gueidaniana Weerakoon & Lücking (2015) – Singapore
- Ocellularia guianensis (Sipman) Divakar & Mangold (2010)
- Ocellularia guptei (Nagarkar, Sethy & Patw.) D.D.Awasthi (1991)
- Ocellularia gymnocarpa (Nyl.) Zahlbr. (1923)

== H ==
- Ocellularia halei M.Cáceres, Aptroot & Lücking (2014) – Brazil
- Ocellularia henatomma (Ach.) Müll.Arg. (1887)
- Ocellularia hernandeziana Kraichak, Lücking & Lumbsch (2014)
- Ocellularia holospora (Harm.) Zahlbr. (1923)
- Ocellularia homopasta (Nyl.) Frisch (2006)

== I ==
- Ocellularia immersocarpa M.Cáceres, Aptroot & Lücking (2014) – Brazil
- Ocellularia imshaugii Lücking (2015)
- Ocellularia inconspicua Lücking, Lumbsch & Parnmen (2014) – New Caledonia
- Ocellularia inexpectata Nagarkar & Hale (1989)
- Ocellularia inspersata Kalb & Lücking (2012)
- Ocellularia inspersipallens Lücking, B.Moncada & Álvaro (2023) – Colombia
- Ocellularia inspersula Lücking & Aptroot (2012)
- Ocellularia interponenda (Nyl.) Hale (1980)
- Ocellularia interposita (Nyl.) Hale (1980)
- Ocellularia inthanonensis Homchant. & Coppins (2002) – Thailand
- Ocellularia inturgescens (Müll.Arg.) Mangold (2009)
- Ocellularia isidioalbula Mangold (2009)
- Ocellularia isidiza Lücking, J.E.Hern. & Kalb (2012) – Venezuela
- Ocellularia isohypocrellina Lücking & Kalb (2012)

== J ==
- Ocellularia jamesii (Patw. & C.R.Kulk.) D.D.Awasthi (1991)

== K ==
- Ocellularia kalbii Mangold, Elix & Lumbsch (2007)
- Ocellularia kanneliyensis Hale (1981)
- Ocellularia kansriae Homchant. & Coppins (2002) – Thailand
- Ocellularia karnatakensis Hale (1978)
- Ocellularia keralensis Patw. & C.R.Kulk. ex Hale (1981)
- Ocellularia khaoyaiana (Homchant. & Coppins) Lücking (2014)
- Ocellularia khasiana (Patw. & Nagarkar) Kraichak, Lücking & Lumbsch (2014)
- Ocellularia khuntanensis (Homchant. & Coppins) Lumbsch & Papong (2010)
- Ocellularia klinhomii Naksuwankul, Lücking & Lumbsch (2016) – Thailand
- Ocellularia kohphangangensis Papong, Mangold & Lücking (2014) – Thailand
- Ocellularia krathingensis Homchant. & Coppins (2002) – Thailand

== L ==
- Ocellularia lacerata M.Cáceres, Aptroot & Lücking (2014) – Brazil
- Ocellularia laevigatula Kalb & Lücking (2012)
- Ocellularia laeviuscula (Nyl.) Kraichak, Lücking & Lumbsch (2014)
- Ocellularia laeviusculoides Sipman & Lücking (2012)
- Ocellularia landronii Hale (1978)
- Ocellularia lathraea (Tuck.) Zahlbr. (1923)
- Ocellularia latilabra (Tuck.) Müll.Arg. (1895)
- Ocellularia leioplacoides (Nyl.) Frisch (2006)
- Ocellularia leptopora (Leight.) Zahlbr. (1923)
- Ocellularia leucina (Müll.Arg.) Hale (1980)
- Ocellularia leucocarpoides (Nyl.) Lücking (2021)
- Ocellularia leucocavata Rivas Plata, Sipman & Lücking (2014) – Philippines
- Ocellularia leucotrema (Nyl. ex Vain.) Zahlbr. (1923)
- Ocellularia leucotylia (Nyl.) Müll.Arg. (1891)
- Ocellularia liamuiga Lücking (2015)
- Ocellularia lichexanthocavata Aptroot (2023) – Brazil
- Ocellularia lichexanthonica Poengs. & Lumbsch (2024)
- Ocellularia lithophila Redinger (1936) – Brazil
- Ocellularia lumbschii S.Joshi & Hur (2015) – Vietnam
- Ocellularia lunensis (Nagarkar & Hale) Lücking (2015) – Cuba

== M ==
- Ocellularia macrocrocea Kalb (2020)
- Ocellularia macrospora Liu, S.-H.Jiang & Lücking (2025) – China
- Ocellularia mahabalei (Patw. & C.R.Kulk.) D.D.Awasthi (1991)
- Ocellularia mammicula (Hale) Lücking (2014)
- Ocellularia margaritacea (Redinger) Lücking (2014)
- Ocellularia maricaoensis Lücking (2015)
- Ocellularia marmorata L.I.Ferraro, Lücking, Aptroot & M.Cáceres (2014) – Argentina
- Ocellularia masonhalei (Patw. & C.R.Kulk.) Lücking (2016)
- Ocellularia massalongoi (Mont.) Hale (1980)
- Ocellularia mauritiana Hale (1975)
- Ocellularia maxima (Hale) Lumbsch & Mangold (2012)
- Ocellularia megalospora (Müll.Arg.) Lücking (2014) – Philippines
- Ocellularia melanostoma (Kremp.) Kalb (1983)
- Ocellularia microascidium (Vain.) Zahlbr. (1923)
- Ocellularia microsorediata Rivas Plata & Lücking (2012) – Peru
- Ocellularia microspora Liu, S.-H.Jiang & Lücking (2025) – China
- Ocellularia microstoma (Müll.Arg.) Hale (2009)
- Ocellularia misionensis L.I.Ferraro & Lücking (2014) – Argentina
- Ocellularia monosporoides (Nyl.) Hale (1980)
- Ocellularia mordenii Hale (1974)
- Ocellularia myrioporella (Nyl.) Zahlbr. (1923)
- Ocellularia myriotrema M.Cáceres, Aptroot & Lücking (2014) – Brazil

== N ==
- Ocellularia natashae Rivas Plata & Lücking (2012) – Peru
- Ocellularia neocaledonica Lücking, Lumbsch & Parnmen (2014) – New Caledonia
- Ocellularia neocavata Hale (1981)
- Ocellularia neoleucina Homchant. & Coppins (2002) – Thailand
- Ocellularia neomasonhalei (Patw., Sethy & Nagarkar) D.D. Awasthi (1991)
- Ocellularia neoperforata Homchant. & Coppins (2002) – Thailand
- Ocellularia neopertusariiformis Hale (1981)
- Ocellularia nigririmis Lücking & Pérez-Ort. (2015) – Cuba
- Ocellularia nigropuncta Hale (1974)
- Ocellularia nureliya (Hale) Patw., Sethy & Nagarkar (1986) – India

== O ==
- Ocellularia obovata (Stirt.) Müll.Arg. (1894)
- Ocellularia obscura (Hale) Hale (1980)
- Ocellularia obturascens (Nyl.) Hale (1987)
- Ocellularia octolocularis (C. Knight) Shirley (1899)
- Ocellularia oculata (Vain.) Rivas Plata, Lücking & Lumbsch (2012)
- Ocellularia ornata M.Cáceres, Aptroot & Lücking (2014) – Brazil
- Ocellularia orthomastia (Kremp.) Zahlbr. (1923)

== P ==
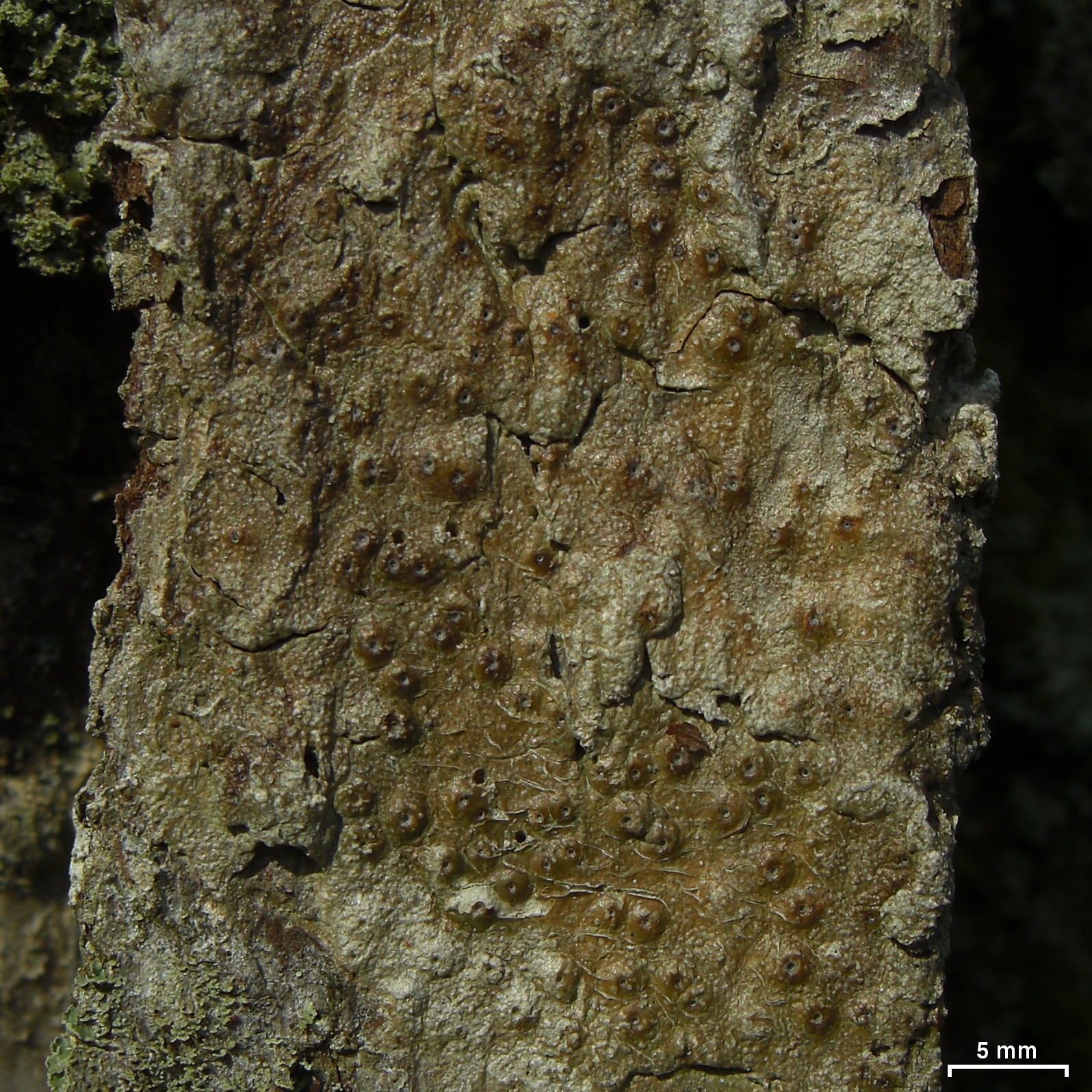
Ocellularia praestans

- Ocellularia palianensis Sutjar. & Kalb (2014) – Thailand
- Ocellularia papillata (Leight.) Zahlbr. (1923)
- Ocellularia papillifera L.I.Ferraro, Lücking, Aptroot & M.Cáceres (2014) – Argentina
- Ocellularia papuana Müll.Arg. (1884)
- Ocellularia parvidisca (Sipman) Lücking (2016)
- Ocellularia parvula (Kremp.) Zahlbr. (1923)
- Ocellularia pauciseptata (Purvis & P.James) Aptroot (2010)
- Ocellularia peremergens Homchant. & Coppins (2002) – Thailand
- Ocellularia perforata (Leight.) Müll.Arg. (1892)
- Ocellularia permaculata (Nagarkar & Hale) Lücking (2014)
- Ocellularia persimilis (Kremp.) Müll.Arg. (1894)
- Ocellularia pertusarioides (Nagarkar, Sethy & Patw.) Lücking (2016)
- Ocellularia petrinensis J.C.David (1995) – Mauritius
- Ocellularia phaeotropa (Kremp.) Zahlbr. (1923)
- Ocellularia phatamensis Naksuwankul, Lücking & Lumbsch (2016) – Thailand
- Ocellularia pichinchensis Lücking (2015)
- Ocellularia piperis (Vain.) Aptroot (2002)
- Ocellularia pitalensis Sipman (2014)
- Ocellularia planaria (Hale) Hale (1980)
- Ocellularia platychlamys Müll.Arg. (1895)
- Ocellularia plicata Rivas Plata & Lücking (2012) – Peru
- Ocellularia pluripora Hale (1981)
- Ocellularia pluriporoides Homchant. & Coppins (2002) – Thailand
- Ocellularia polydisca Redinger (1933) – Brazil
- Ocellularia pomiformis (Kremp.) Overeem & D.Overeem (1922)
- Ocellularia poncinsiana Hue (1916)
- Ocellularia portoricensis Merc.-Díaz, Lücking & Parnmen (2014) – Puerto Rico
- Ocellularia poschlodiana Sutjar. & Kalb (2015) – Thailand
- Ocellularia postposita (Nyl.) Frisch (2006)
- Ocellularia praestans (Müll.Arg.) Hale (1980)
- Ocellularia praestantoides Sipman (2012)
- Ocellularia protoinspersa Rivas Plata & Lücking (2012) – Peru
- Ocellularia protomegaspora Aptroot & Schumm (2012)
- Ocellularia psathyroloma Müll.Arg. (1891)
- Ocellularia pseudochapsa M.Cáceres, Aptroot & Lücking (2014) – Brazil
- Ocellularia pseudopapillata Papong, Mangold & Lücking (2014) – Thailand
- Ocellularia pseudopyrenuloides Lücking (2012)
- Ocellularia pseudostromatica M.Cáceres, Aptroot & Lücking (2014) – Brazil
- Ocellularia psorbarroensis Sipman (2012)
- Ocellularia psoromica (Hale) Hale (1980)
- Ocellularia pulchella Lücking, Lumbsch & Parnmen (2014) – New Caledonia
- Ocellularia punctulata (Leight.) Zahlbr. (1923)
- Ocellularia pustulata Rivas Plata & Lücking (2012) – Peru
- Ocellularia pycnophragmia (Nyl.) Zahlbr. (1923)
- Ocellularia pyrenuloides Zahlbr. (1944)

== R ==
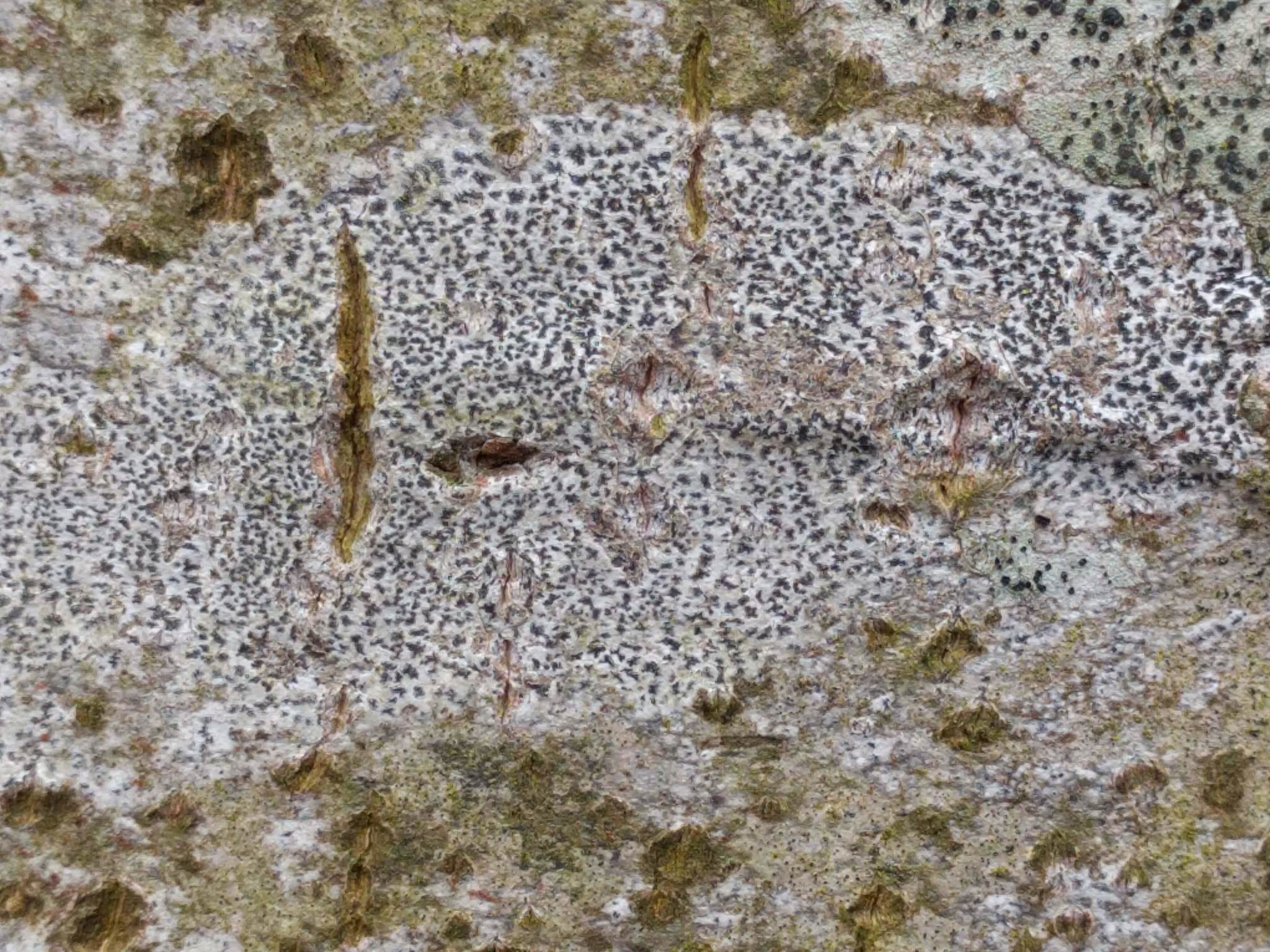
Ocellularia radiata

- Ocellularia radiata Lücking (2015) – Cuba
- Ocellularia rassagala Hale (1981)
- Ocellularia ratnapurensis Weerakoon, Lücking & Lumbsch (2016)
- Ocellularia raveniana Weerakoon, Lücking & Lumbsch (2014) – Sri Lanka
- Ocellularia reticulata Mangold (2009)
- Ocellularia retispora R.C.Harris (1990)
- Ocellularia rhabdospora (Nyl.) Redinger (1936) – Brazil
- Ocellularia rhicnopora Hale (1981)
- Ocellularia rhicnoporoides Homchant. & Coppins (2002) – Thailand
- Ocellularia rhodostroma (Mont.) Zahlbr. (1923)
- Ocellularia ripleyi Hale (1974)
- Ocellularia rivasplatana Weerakoon & Lücking (2015) – Singapore
- Ocellularia rondoniana M.Cáceres, Aptroot & Lücking (2014) – Brazil
- Ocellularia rongklaensis (Homchant. & Coppins) Lücking (2014)
- Ocellularia roseotecta Homchant. & Coppins (2002) – Thailand
- Ocellularia rotundifumosa Naksuwankul, Lücking & Lumbsch (2016) – Thailand
- Ocellularia rubropolydiscus M.Cáceres, Aptroot & Lücking (2014) – Brazil
- Ocellularia rudior (Vain.) Lücking (2015)
- Ocellularia rufocinctoides Lücking, B Moncada & Álvaro (2023) – Colombia
- Ocellularia rugosa Sipman (2014)
- Ocellularia rugosothallina Lücking, Lumbsch & Parnmen (2014) – New Caledonia

== S ==
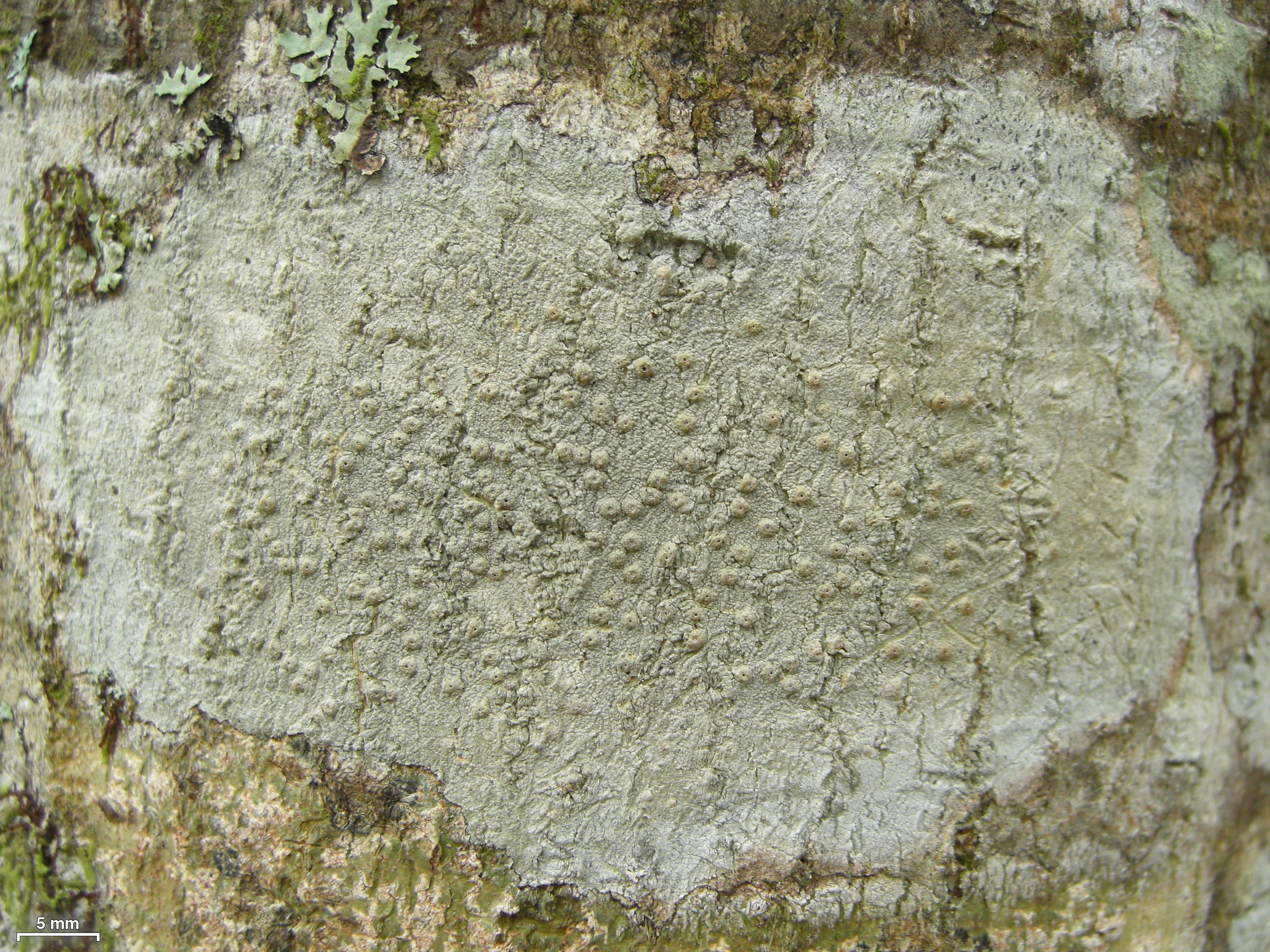
Ocellularia sanfordiana

- Ocellularia salazinica Papong, Mangold & Lücking (2014) – Thailand
- Ocellularia salmonea Lücking, Lumbsch & Parnmen (2014) – New Caledonia
- Ocellularia sanfordiana (Zahlbr.) Hale (1980)
- Ocellularia saxicola S.Joshi & Hur (2015) – Vietnam
- Ocellularia saxiprotocetrarica Poengs. & Lumbsch (2024)
- Ocellularia sinensis Liu, S.-H.Jiang & Lücking (2025) – China
- Ocellularia sipmanii Lücking, B.Moncada & Álvaro (2023) – Colombia
- Ocellularia soralifera Kalb (2009)
- Ocellularia sorediata Hale (1974)
- Ocellularia soredica Kalb (2009)
- Ocellularia sorediigera Kalb (2009)
- Ocellularia squamuloides (Sipman) Lücking (2016)
- Ocellularia stictica (Hale) Hale (1980)
- Ocellularia sticticans Hale (1981)
- Ocellularia straminea (Vain.) Hale (1980)
- Ocellularia striata Kalb & Schumm (2021)
- Ocellularia subcalvescens (Nyl.) Divakar & Mangold (2010)
- Ocellularia subcarassensis Sipman & Lücking (2012)
- Ocellularia subdolichotata Papong, Mangold & Lumbsch (2014) – Thailand
- Ocellularia subfumosa Z.F.Jia & Li S.Wang (2016)
- Ocellularia subgranulosa (Homchant. & Coppins) Lumbsch & Papong (2010)
- Ocellularia subkeralensis (Nagarkar, Sethy & Patw.) S.Joshi & Upreti (2018) – India
- Ocellularia sublaeviusculoides Rivas Plata, Sipman & Lücking (2014) – Philippines
- Ocellularia subleucina Homchant. & Coppins (2002) – Thailand
- Ocellularia subminuta (Homchant. & Coppins) Lücking (2014)
- Ocellularia subperforata Nagarkar, Sethy & Patw. (1988) – India
- Ocellularia subpraestans (Hale) Hale (1980)
- Ocellularia subpyrenuloides Lücking (2012)
- Ocellularia subsimilis (Hale) Hale (1980)
- Ocellularia subudupiensis Weerakoon & Lücking (2015) – Singapore
- Ocellularia supergracilis Kalb & Lücking (2012)

== T ==
- Ocellularia tacarcunae Lücking (2012)
- Ocellularia tanii Sipman (2003)
- Ocellularia terebrata (Ach.) Müll.Arg. (1887)
- Ocellularia terrabensis Kalb & Lücking (2012)
- Ocellularia thailandica Naksuwankul, Kraichak & Lumbsch (2016) – Thailand
- Ocellularia thelotrematoides Zenker (1827)
- Ocellularia thryptica Hale (1973)
- Ocellularia tomatlanensis Herrera-Camp., Colín & Lücking (2019)
- Ocellularia trachodes (Nyl.) Zahlbr. (1923)
- Ocellularia tuberculata Nagarkar & Hale (1989)
- Ocellularia turbinata Mangold (2009)
- Ocellularia turgidula Müll.Arg. (1893)
- Ocellularia udupiensis Patw., Sethy & Nagarkar (1986)

== U ==
- Ocellularia umbilicata Müll.Arg. (1894)
- Ocellularia umbilicatoides R.N.Peláez, B.Moncada & Lücking (2014) – Colombia
- Ocellularia upretii S.Joshi, Divakar, Lumbsch & Lücking (2018) – India
- Ocellularia usnicolor R.N.Peláez, B.Moncada & Lücking (2014) – Colombia

== V ==
- Ocellularia verrucomarginata Patw., Sethy & Nagarkar (1986) – India
- Ocellularia verrucosa (Fée) Hale (1978)
- Ocellularia verruculosa H.Magn. (1955)
- Ocellularia vezdana Frisch (2006)
- Ocellularia violacea Räsänen (1949)
- Ocellularia virens (Müll.Arg.) Hale (1980)
- Ocellularia viridipallens Müll.Arg. (1887)
- Ocellularia viridis Hale (1978)
- Ocellularia vizcayensis Rivas Plata, Duya & Lücking (2011)
- Ocellularia vulcanisorediata Merc.-Díaz, Lücking & Parnmen (2014) – Puerto Rico

== W ==
- Ocellularia wandoorensis Nagarkar, Sethy & Patw. (1986) – Andaman Islands
- Ocellularia wirthii Mangold, Elix & Lumbsch (2008)
- Ocellularia wolseleyana Homchant. & Coppins (2002) – Thailand

== X ==
- Ocellularia xantholeuca Müll.Arg. (1891)
- Ocellularia xanthostroma (Nyl.) Zahlbr. (1923)
- Ocellularia xanthostromiza (Nyl.) Zahlbr. (1923)

== Z ==
- Ocellularia zamorana Sipman, Lücking & Chaves (2012)
- Ocellularia zenkeri Frisch (2006)
