= Ocellularia plicata =

Scientific classification
- Kingdom: Fungi
- Division: Ascomycota
- Class: Lecanoromycetes
- Order: Graphidales
- Family: Graphidaceae
- Genus: Ocellularia
- Species: O. plicata

Binomial name
- Ocellularia plicata Rivas Plata & Lücking (2012)
- Type locality: Los Amigos Biological Station, Peru

Species of lichen-forming fungus

Ocellularia plicata is a species of crustose lichen-forming fungus in the family Graphidaceae. It is a yellow-white, bark-dwelling lichen with a distinctively ridged, folded-looking surface, known only from lowland tropical rainforest in Madre de Dios, Peru. The species was described in 2012 and is named for the pleated appearance of its thallus.

== Taxonomy ==
Ocellularia plicata was described as a new species by Eimy Rivas Plata and Robert Lücking in 2012, based on material collected in Amazonian Peru at the Los Amigos Research and Training Center (CICRA) in the Department of Madre de Dios. The species epithet plicata refers to the ridged thallus surface, which has a folded or pleated appearance.

== Description ==
This species is a crustose lichen with a continuous, yellow-white thallus up to 5 cm (2 in) across and 70–120 μm thick. The surface is strongly uneven and forms irregular ridges that can give it a folded appearance. The photosynthetic partner (photobiont) is a member of the green alga genus Trentepohlia.

The apothecia are erumpent and rounded to angular, about 0.4–0.7 mm in diameter, with a narrow pore (0.1–0.2 mm wide) and a simple central column (columella). The upper parts of the columella and excipulum are carbonized (blackened). Ascospores are produced eight per ascus and are oblong-ellipsoid, 7-septate, and 25–35 × 7–9 μm. The species contains psoromic, subpsoromic, and 2'-O-demethylpsoromic acids.

== Habitat and distribution ==
Ocellularia plicata is known from tropical lowland rainforest in Peru (Madre de Dios), where it was collected on tree bark in secondary forest at about 270 m (890 ft) elevation, roughly 90 km (56 mi) west of Puerto Maldonado.

== See also ==
- List of Ocellularia species
