= Ocellularia fenestrata =

Scientific classification
- Kingdom: Fungi
- Division: Ascomycota
- Class: Lecanoromycetes
- Order: Graphidales
- Family: Graphidaceae
- Genus: Ocellularia
- Species: O. fenestrata

Binomial name
- Ocellularia fenestrata Rivas Plata & Lücking (2012)
- Type locality: Los Amigos Biological Station, Peru

Species of lichen-forming fungus

Ocellularia fenestrata is a species of bark-dwelling, crustose lichen-forming fungus in the family Graphidaceae. It is an olive-green lichen that grows on tree bark in lowland tropical rainforest, recorded from Peru, Brazil, and Colombia. The species was described in 2012 and is named for the distinctive window-like perforations in the central column of its fruiting bodies.

== Taxonomy ==
Ocellularia fenestrata was described as new to science by Eimy Rivas Plata and Robert Lücking in 2012 from material collected at Los Amigos Research and Training Center (CICRA) in Madre de Dios, Peru. The species epithet, fenestra, refers to its "fenestrate" (window-like) columella.

== Description ==
The thallus of O. fenestrata is crustose and grows on bark. It is olive-green, continuous, and up to 5 cm (2 in) across, with a thickness of about 60–100 μm. It has a dense cortex with a smooth to uneven surface texture. The photobiont is from the green algal genus Trentepohlia, with cells about 7–12 × 5–8 μm. Crystals are generally absent from the photobiont layer except near the apothecia, and the medulla is indistinct and white.

The fruiting bodies (apothecia) are rounded to angular, sunken in the thallus to partly protruding (immersed to erumpent), and about 0.4–0.6 mm in diameter. The disc is covered by a pore-like opening (about 0.2–0.3 mm wide) and a central column (columella) that ranges from simple to irregularly perforated (fenestrate). The columella is not blackened (not carbonized) and is colorless to brown toward the top. The outer wall of the fruiting body (excipulum) is light brown to brown, and hair-like filaments (periphysoids) are absent. The spore-bearing layer (hymenium) is clear and about 90–100 μm high. Each ascus contains eight oval (ellipsoid), 6-celled (5-septate) ascospores measuring about 15–20 × 6–8 μm, with thick cross-walls and lens-shaped internal spaces (lumina); they stain violet-blue with iodine (I+ violet-blue). Reported lichen substances include psoromic, subpsoromic, and 2'-O-demethylpsoromic acids.

== Habitat and distribution ==
The species was originally known from the type locality at Los Amigos Research and Training Center (CICRA), about 90 km (56 mi) west of Puerto Maldonado in Madre de Dios, Peru at about 270 m (890 ft) elevation. It was collected in tropical lowland rainforest, growing on the bark of a tree in secondary forest. It has since been reported from Acre, Brazil, and from Caquetá, Colombia.

== See also ==
- List of Ocellularia species
