= Ocellularia microsorediata =

Scientific classification
- Kingdom: Fungi
- Division: Ascomycota
- Class: Lecanoromycetes
- Order: Graphidales
- Family: Graphidaceae
- Genus: Ocellularia
- Species: O. microsorediata

Binomial name
- Ocellularia microsorediata Rivas Plata & Lücking (2012)
- Type locality: Los Amigos Biological Station, Peru

Species of lichen-forming fungus

Ocellularia microsorediata is a species of bark-dwelling, crustose lichen-forming fungus in the family Graphidaceae. It is a light green lichen with a distinctively powdery (sorediate) surface, found growing on tree bark in lowland tropical rainforest in Peru and Bolivia. The species was described in 2012 and is named for its unusually small soredia.

== Taxonomy ==
Ocellularia microsorediata was described as a new species by Eimy Rivas Plata and Robert Lücking in 2012, based on material collected at Los Amigos Research and Training Center (CICRA) in Madre de Dios, Peru. The species epithet microsorediata alludes to the tiny soredia (powdery reproductive granules) that characterise the thallus surface.

== Description ==
This species is a crustose lichen with a light green thallus up to 3 cm (1.2 in) across and 50–80 μm thick. The surface is smooth to uneven and has abundant soredia; the soralia are about 0.1–0.2 mm wide and may merge into irregular or net-like patches. The photobiont is the green alga Trentepohlia, and the photobiont layer and medulla contain clusters of calcium oxalate crystals; the medulla is white but grades indistinctly into surrounding tissues.

The fruiting bodies (apothecia) are rounded to irregular, partly protruding from the thallus (erumpent), and 0.4–0.8 mm in diameter, with the disc visible through a narrow pore-like opening about 0.05–0.1 mm wide; a central column (columella) is absent. The outer wall of the fruiting body (excipulum) is built of interwoven, elongated cells (prosoplectenchymatous) and is dark brown to blackened (carbonized) in the outermost layers. Ascospores are colorless, 6–8-celled (5–7-septate), and measure 20–25 × 6–8 μm; they stain violet-blue with iodine (I+ violet-blue). Thin-layer chromatography detected psoromic, subpsoromic, and 2'-O-demethylpsoromic acids.

== Habitat and distribution ==
Ocellularia microsorediata was originally known from tropical lowland rainforest at Los Amigos Research and Training Center in Madre de Dios, Peru, where it was collected at about 270 m (890 ft) elevation on tree bark in secondary forest. In addition to the type locality in Peru, Ocellularia microsorediata has been recorded from Bolivia. The species was found in low-elevation Preandean Amazon rainforest in La Paz Department (Abel Iturralde Province), where it was found growing on bark along roadsides in natural to semi-natural forest at about 240–400 m (790–1,310 ft) elevation.

== See also ==
- List of Ocellularia species
