= Ocellularia pustulata =

Scientific classification
- Kingdom: Fungi
- Division: Ascomycota
- Class: Lecanoromycetes
- Order: Graphidales
- Family: Graphidaceae
- Genus: Ocellularia
- Species: O. pustulata

Binomial name
- Ocellularia pustulata Rivas Plata & Lücking (2012)
- Type locality: Los Amigos Biological Station, Peru

Species of lichen-forming fungus

Ocellularia pustulata is a species of crustose lichen-forming fungus in the family Graphidaceae. It is a light green-gray to olive-gray, bark-dwelling lichen whose surface is covered in distinctive blister-like swellings that can break open into powdery patches (soralia). The species was described in 2012 from lowland tropical rainforest in Madre de Dios, Peru.

== Taxonomy ==
Ocellularia pustulata was described as a new species by Eimy Rivas Plata and Robert Lücking in 2012, based on material collected in Amazonian Peru. The species epithet pustulata describes the thallus surface, which is covered in small, blister-like swellings (pustulate). In a later treatment of Argentine Graphidaceae, Ferraro and colleagues compared O. pustulata with the coarsely pustulate Leucodecton pustulatum and other pustulate Graphidaceae, noting that in O. pustulata the pustules develop into soralia and the thallus contains psoromic acid.

== Description ==
This species is a crustose lichen with a continuous thallus that is light green-gray to olive-gray and up to 5 cm (2 in) across. The surface is uneven to irregularly warty and produces abundant pustule-like outgrowths that can become sorediate at the tips; the soredia are the same color as the thallus. The photobiont is from the green algal genus Trentepohlia, and the thallus contains clusters of calcium oxalate crystals. The medulla is white but not sharply outlined.

The apothecia are rounded to irregular and prominent, measuring 0.5–1 mm across, with the disc visible through a pore. A central column (columella) is absent. The hymenium is clear, and the ascospores are ellipsoid, 5–7-septate, and 20–25 × 7–10 μm. Thin-layer chromatography detected psoromic, subpsoromic, and 2'-O-demethylpsoromic acids (with P+ yellow reactions reported).

== Habitat and distribution ==
Ocellularia pustulata is known from the Los Amigos Research and Training Center in Madre de Dios, Peru, where it was collected at 270 m (890 ft) elevation in tropical lowland rainforest, growing on tree bark in secondary forest.

== See also ==
- List of Ocellularia species
