= Ocellularia rivasplatana =

Scientific classification
- Domain: Eukaryota
- Kingdom: Fungi
- Division: Ascomycota
- Class: Lecanoromycetes
- Order: Graphidales
- Family: Graphidaceae
- Genus: Ocellularia
- Species: O. rivasplatana

Binomial name
- Ocellularia rivasplatana Weerakoon & Lücking (2015)

Species of lichen

Ocellularia rivasplatana is a species of corticolous (bark-dwelling) lichen in the family Graphidaceae. Found in Singapore, it was formally described as a new species in 2015 by Gothamie Weerakoon and Robert Lücking. The type specimen was collected by the first author from a low-elevation primary forest in the Bukit Timah Nature Reserve. It is only known to occur at the type locality. The species epithet honours lichenologist Eimy Rivas Plata.

The thallus of the lichen is light green, lacks a prothallus, and measures up to 10 cm (4 in) in diameter. The photobiont partner of the lichen is from the green algal genus Trentepohlia; their cells are yellowish-green and measure 6–10 by 5–8 μm. Although Ocellularia exigua is somewhat similar in morphology, O. rivasplatana has larger apothecia with broader pores and a black-rimmed margin, which is filled with black-topped columella.

== See also ==
- List of Ocellularia species
