= Ocellularia albobullata =

Scientific classification
- Domain: Eukaryota
- Kingdom: Fungi
- Division: Ascomycota
- Class: Lecanoromycetes
- Order: Graphidales
- Family: Graphidaceae
- Genus: Ocellularia
- Species: O. albobullata

Binomial name
- Ocellularia albobullata Lücking, Sipman & Grube (2011)

Species of lichen

Ocellularia albobullata is a rare species of corticolous (bark-dwelling) lichen in the family Graphidaceae. It was described in 2011 from specimens collected in Corcovado National Park on Costa Rica's Osa Peninsula. The lichen forms a distinctive chalky white to light-gray crust with a bumpy, blister-like surface and conspicuous fruiting bodies that sit atop the raised bumps. It is known only from the coastal rainforests of southern Costa Rica, where it grows on tree trunks in old-growth and mature secondary forests near sea level.

== Taxonomy ==
Ocellularia albobullata was described as new to science by the lichenologists Robert Lücking, Harrie Sipman, and Martin Grube from material gathered in Corcovado National Park on Costa Rica's Osa Peninsula. Within the large, bark-dwelling genus Ocellularia (family Graphidaceae) it belongs to a small group of species that contain psoromic acid derivatives yet lack the usual olive-green thallus color. Its white-gray, blistered (bullate) surface, the presence of a pale pseudocolumella inside each apothecium, and a non-carbonized apothecial wall separate it from chemically similar relatives such as O. antillensis, O. wirthii, and O. calvescens, all of which have smooth crusts and a dark, carbonized excipulum.

== Description ==
The lichen forms a chalky white to light-gray crust on bark. The surface is strongly bullate—made up of small, dome-like swellings (bullae)—because the outer cortex is a dense tangle of fungal threads (hyphae) that can split internally and push upward. Beneath the cortex, both the algal zone and the medulla contain scattered clusters of calcium oxalate crystals that glitter under polarized light. Chemical spot tests are K–, C–, P+ (yellow), consistent with psoromic, subpsoromic, and 2'-O-demethylpsoromic acids.

Fruiting bodies (apothecia) are conspicuous, mostly 0.7–1.2 mm across, and sit in the tops of the bullae. Each is roofed by a narrow pore 0.2–0.3 mm wide. A whitish thalline rim encircles the pore and is partly buried under the cortex. Inside, a brown, frost-coated pseudocolumella rises from the floor like an irregular peg. The apothecial wall is orange-brown and made of tightly interwoven hyphae; no periphysoids are visible. The spore layer (hymenium) is 60–80 μm tall and contains simple, unbranched paraphyses. Every ascus holds eight clear, ellipsoid ascospores, each with three to five cross-walls and thickened partitions (10–20 × 6–9 μm). In iodine solution the spores turn violet-blue (amyloid), a common trait in the family.

== Habitat and distribution ==
Ocellularia albobullata is known from several collections in the coastal rainforests of southern Costa Rica, all within or near the Sirena sector of Corcovado National Park. It grows on the lower trunks of trees in old-growth and mature secondary forest close to sea level, where warm, humid, and lightly exposed conditions prevail. No records exist outside the Osa Peninsula. It is one of about sixty species of Ocellularia that have been documented from Costa Rica.

== See also ==
- List of Ocellularia species
