= Ocellularia sipmanii =

Scientific classification
- Kingdom: Fungi
- Division: Ascomycota
- Class: Lecanoromycetes
- Order: Graphidales
- Family: Graphidaceae
- Genus: Ocellularia
- Species: O. sipmanii

Binomial name
- Ocellularia sipmanii Lücking, B.Moncada & Álvaro (2023)
- Type locality: Comunidad de Villazul, Amazonas, Colombia

Species of lichen-forming fungus

Ocellularia sipmanii is a species of crustose lichen-forming fungus in the family Graphidaceae. It is a whitish to pale olive-green, bark-dwelling lichen with small, sunken fruiting bodies that have a distinctive double-rimmed pore and a finger-shaped central column. The species was described in 2023 from savanna forest in the Colombian Amazon and is named in honor of the lichenologist Harrie Sipman.

== Taxonomy ==
Ocellularia sipmanii was described as a new species by Robert Lücking, Bibiana Moncada, and Wilson Ricardo Álvaro-Alba. At first glance, the species resembles members of Clandestinotrema, particularly C. protoalbum, in its whitish thallus and largely sunken fruiting bodies with a white rim and darker surrounding margin, but the iodine-staining cross-walls and lens-shaped internal spaces of the spores rule out placement in that genus. The most similar species within Ocellularia is O. abbayesiana, which shares the Clandestinotrema-like appearance but has larger, more heavily divided spores. The authors dedicated the species epithet sipmanii to the lichenologist Harrie Sipman "for his numerous and invaluable contributions to tropical lichenology".

== Description ==
Ocellularia sipmanii is a crust-forming (crustose) lichen with a continuous body (thallus) up to 3 cm (1.2 in) across and about 50–70 μm thick. The surface is smooth to somewhat uneven, whitish to very pale olive-green, and slightly shiny. In cross-section, the thallus has a distinct outer skin (cortex, 10–15 μm thick), a distinct algal layer (algal layer, 10–15 μm thick), and an indistinct inner tissue (medulla, 30–50 μm thick) with small gray crystals. The algal partner (photobiont) is from the green algal genus Trentepohlia.

The fruiting bodies (ascomata) are sunken in the thallus to slightly protruding (immersed to slightly erumpent) and have a central column (columella). They are 0.25–0.35 mm in diameter and 0.15–0.2 mm high, with a pore-like opening 0.05–0.1 mm wide. The pore is bordered by a whitish rim surrounded by a darker brown rim, and the disc is not visible through the opening. The columella is finger-shaped (up to 0.15 mm broad) and dark brown to blackened (carbonized). The asci are cylindrical (70–80 × 7–10 μm), each containing eight oval (ellipsoid) ascospores arranged in a single row (uniseriate). The spores are 4-celled (3-septate) and measure 10–13 × 4.5–5 μm; they are colorless, have thickened cross-walls with lens-shaped internal spaces (lenticular lumina), and stain violet-blue with iodine (I+ violet-blue). Thin-layer chromatography detected psoromic acid as the major substance, with subpsoromic acid and 2'-O-demethylpsoromic acid in minor to trace amounts. The inner tissue reacts P+ (yellow), while the thallus and fruiting bodies are K-negative in section.

== Habitat and distribution ==
The species is known from the type collection in Colombia (Amazonas Department), from Comunidad de Villazul east of Araracuara on the north bank of the Caquetá River, at about 300 m (980 ft) elevation. It was collected as an epiphyte on bark in light savanna forest on podsolized soil with a peaty surface layer over Tertiary sediments.

== See also ==
- List of Ocellularia species
