= Ocellularia portoricensis =

Scientific classification
- Domain: Eukaryota
- Kingdom: Fungi
- Division: Ascomycota
- Class: Lecanoromycetes
- Order: Graphidales
- Family: Graphidaceae
- Genus: Ocellularia
- Species: O. portoricensis

Binomial name
- Ocellularia portoricensis Merc.-Díaz, Lücking & Parnmen (2014)

Species of lichen

Ocellularia portoricensis is a rare species of corticolous (bark-dwelling) crustose lichen in the family Graphidaceae. It was discovered in Puerto Rico, where it grows on tree trunks within shadowy understories of specific forests. This organism is distinct from other related lichens by its unique characteristics such as a white medulla and relatively larger, brown-tinted ascospores.

== Taxonomy ==
The species was first formally described by lichenologists Joel Mercado-Diáz, Robert Lücking, and Sittiporn Parnmen in 2014. The chosen epithet of the species, portoricensis, pays homage to its native land, Puerto Rico. Phylogenetically, molecular sequence data suggests a close kinship with two other species: O. polydiscus and O. xanthostromiza, both of which possess pale yellow pigments in the medulla. The type specimen was discovered by the first author in Canóvanas, Puerto Rico.

== Description ==
Ocellularia portoricensis stands out from other lichen species through certain key features. Its thallus, which spans up to 10 cm (4 in) in diameter, is olive-green to yellowish-green in colour, and boasts a coarse, densely verrucose surface. The species does not have a prothallus.

When examined in section, the thallus reveals multiple layers: a thin, paraplectenchymatous cortex, a photobiont layer filled with small, grey crystals, and a thick medulla which contains large clusters of calcium oxalate crystals. The photobiont, Trentepohlia, is made up of irregularly grouped, yellowish-green cells.

The ascomata, or fungal reproductive structures, has a complete thalline margin, and a black columella, visible as a thin, whitish rim around the pore. Its ascospores are larger than most in the genus, measuring 60–80 by 8–10 μm and are oblong, have 11 to 15 septa, and eventually turn brown.

== Similar species ==
Ocellularia portoricensis is part of the genus Ocellularia and shares general morphology and secondary chemistry with the type species, O. cavata. However, it is distinguished by the absence of a medullary pigment and the larger, pigmented ascospores. Other species within the group, such as O. rhabdospora, also produce large ascospores, but these always remain hyaline, or transparent. Brown ascospores are a rarity in genus Ocellularia and are also seen in the distantly related O. allospora, which lacks secondary substances and has a smooth thallus with emerging ascomata.

== Habitat and distribution ==
This species was discovered in the shaded understory of a palo colorado forest in El Yunque National Forest, Puerto Rico. It was found thriving on the living trunk of an unidentified tree. Given its specific habitat, it may have a restricted distribution.

== See also ==
- List of Ocellularia species
