= Ocellularia cloonanii =

Scientific classification
- Domain: Eukaryota
- Kingdom: Fungi
- Division: Ascomycota
- Class: Lecanoromycetes
- Order: Graphidales
- Family: Graphidaceae
- Genus: Ocellularia
- Species: O. cloonanii

Binomial name
- Ocellularia cloonanii Weerakoon, Lücking & Lumbsch (2014)

Species of lichen

Ocellularia cloonanii is a species of corticolous lichen in the family Graphidaceae. Found in Sri Lanka, it was formally described as a new species in 2014 by lichenologists Gothamie Weerakoon, Robert Lücking, and Helge Thorsten Lumbsch. The type specimen was collected from a high-elevation montane forest in the Fishing Hut Tea Estate (Sabaragamuwa Province) at an altitude of 1,870 m (6,140 ft). The lichen is only known to occur at the type locality in the Horton Plains. The specific epithet cloonanii honours Colman Patrick Cloonan, "for his immense help in carrying out the research studies". Ocellularia cloonanii has an olive-grey thallus up to 5 cm (2 in) in diameter, with continuous but uneven surface. Its ascospores are hyaline, ellipsoid in shape, contain seven to nine septa, and measure 35–40 by 7–10 μm. Secondary chemicals present in the lichen include psoromic acid, subpsoromic acid, and 2’-O-demethylpsoromic acid.

== See also ==
- List of Ocellularia species
