= Ocellularia subudupiensis =

Scientific classification
- Domain: Eukaryota
- Kingdom: Fungi
- Division: Ascomycota
- Class: Lecanoromycetes
- Order: Graphidales
- Family: Graphidaceae
- Genus: Ocellularia
- Species: O. subudupiensis

Binomial name
- Ocellularia subudupiensis Weerakoon & Lücking (2015)

Species of lichen

Ocellularia subudupiensis is a rare species of corticolous (bark-dwelling) lichen in the family Graphidaceae. Found in Singapore, it was formally described as a new species in 2015 by Gothamie Weerakoon and Robert Lücking. The type specimen was collected by the first author from a low-elevation primary forest in the Bukit Timah Nature Reserve. It is only known to occur at the type locality. The species epithet refers to its similarity with Ocellularia udupiensis. It differs from this lichen in its relatively rough thallus surface in addition to its secondary chemistry, as it contains three unidentified lichen products that are detectable using thin-layer chromatography.

The thallus of the lichen is greenish grey to yellowish grey, lacks a prothallus, and measures up to 10 cm (4 in) in diameter. The photobiont partner of the lichen is from the green algal genus Trentepohlia; their cells are yellowish-green and measure 8–12 by 6–10 μm. The ascospores of O. subudupiensis, which number eight per ascus, are ellipsoid and hyaline, measuring 25–30 by 6–7 μm; they have between 5 and 7 septa.

== See also ==
- List of Ocellularia species
