= Ocellularia vulcanisorediata =

Scientific classification
- Domain: Eukaryota
- Kingdom: Fungi
- Division: Ascomycota
- Class: Lecanoromycetes
- Order: Graphidales
- Family: Graphidaceae
- Genus: Ocellularia
- Species: O. vulcanisorediata

Binomial name
- Ocellularia vulcanisorediata Merc.-Díaz, Lücking & Parnmen (2014)

Species of lichen

Ocellularia vulcanisorediata is a rare species of corticolous (bark-dwelling) lichen in the family Graphidaceae. Described as a new species in 2014, it is only known to occur in Puerto Rico.

== Taxonomy ==
Ocellularia vulcanisorediata was described as a novel species by lichenologists Joel Mercado-Díaz, Robert Lücking, and Sittiporn Parnmen in 2014. The species epithet, vulcanisorediata, takes inspiration from the large, protruding soralia that resemble tiny volcanoes, a unique characteristic of this species. The type specimen was discovered in Puerto Rico, within the Barrio Río Blanco of Naguabo. Molecular studies have revealed that Ocellularia vulcanisorediata, despite its current classification, does not truly belong to the Ocellularia genus, instead aligning more closely with Ocellularia conformalis and other undescribed genera. According to the authors, more comprehensive molecular data is required to establish its taxonomic position definitively.

== Description ==
Ocellularia vulcanisorediata differs notably from Ocellularia conformalis, particularly with regards to its transversely septate ascospores and the large, protruding soralia. The lichen forms a continuous thallus, with a surface that ranges from smooth to uneven and exhibits a light greyish-green colour. The soralia, reminiscent of miniature volcanoes, are dispersed regularly across the thallus and are absent from the paratype specimen.

Internally, the thallus is layered with a thick prosoplectenchymatous cortex, a photobiont layer heavily encrusted with small, grey crystals, and an indistinct medulla devoid of clusters of calcium oxalate crystals, except when bordering the ascomata. The photobiont is Trentepohlia, with cells that are rounded to irregular in outline and grouped irregularly. The species is characterised by oblong-ellipsoid ascospores with 3 to 5 septa, measuring 15–20 by 5–6 μm, and hyaline in appearance. No substances were detected by thin-layer chromatography.

== Similar species ==
If judged solely on its fertile material, Ocellularia vulcanisorediata could be misidentified as Ocellularia papillata or a closely related species. However, molecular data reveal that Ocellularia vulcanisorediata is more closely aligned with Ocellularia conformalis and resides in an as-yet-unnamed genus near Ocellularia pyrenuloides and Melanotrema.

== Habitat and distribution ==
The habitat of Ocellularia vulcanisorediata is specific to the palo colorado forest in El Yunque National Forest, Puerto Rico. It was found growing on a young, unidentified tree in conditions that ranged from shaded to partly illuminated.

== See also ==
- List of Ocellularia species
