= Ocellularia gueidaniana =

Scientific classification
- Domain: Eukaryota
- Kingdom: Fungi
- Division: Ascomycota
- Class: Lecanoromycetes
- Order: Graphidales
- Family: Graphidaceae
- Genus: Ocellularia
- Species: O. gueidaniana

Binomial name
- Ocellularia gueidaniana Weerakoon & Lücking (2015)

Species of lichen

Ocellularia gueidaniana is a species of corticolous (bark-dwelling) lichen in the family Graphidaceae. Found in Singapore, it was formally described as a new species in 2015 by Gothamie Weerakoon and Robert Lücking. The type specimen was collected by the first author at a low elevation in the Bukit Timah Nature Reserve. It is only known to occur at the type locality. The species epithet honours lichenologist Cécile Gueidan.

== See also ==
- List of Ocellularia species
