= Ocellularia protoinspersa =

Scientific classification
- Kingdom: Fungi
- Division: Ascomycota
- Class: Lecanoromycetes
- Order: Graphidales
- Family: Graphidaceae
- Genus: Ocellularia
- Species: O. protoinspersa

Binomial name
- Ocellularia protoinspersa Rivas Plata & Lücking (2012)
- Type locality: Los Amigos Biological Station, Peru

Species of lichen-forming fungus

Ocellularia protoinspersa is a species of crustose lichen-forming fungus in the family Graphidaceae. It is a light olive-green, bark-dwelling lichen with prominent, rounded fruiting bodies, recorded from lowland tropical rainforest in Peru and Brazil. The species was described in 2012 and is named for the combination of its oil-droplet-filled spore-bearing layer and the presence of protocetraric acid.

== Taxonomy ==
Ocellularia protoinspersa was described as a new species by Eimy Rivas Plata and Robert Lücking in 2012, based on material collected during a survey of Graphidaceae at Los Amigos Research and Training Center (CICRA) in Amazonian Peru. The species epithet protoinspersa combines references to its two distinguishing features: the oil-droplet-filled (inspersed) spore-bearing layer (hymenium) and the presence of protocetraric acid as its secondary metabolite.

== Description ==
This species is a crustose lichen with a light olive-green thallus that is continuous and uneven to finely warty, reaching up to 5 cm (2 in) across and about 60–80 μm thick. The photobiont is from the green algal genus Trentepohlia. The photobiont layer and medulla contain clusters of calcium oxalate crystals, and the medulla is white.

The fruiting bodies (apothecia) are rounded and prominent, about 0.5–0.8 mm in diameter, with the disc covered by a pore about 0.2–0.3 mm wide and a central column (columella). The columella is present and simple to broadly stump-shaped, and it is completely carbonized (blackened); the upper half of the excipulum is also carbonized. The hymenium is 120–150 μm high and strongly inspersed. Ascospores are produced eight per ascus; they are oblong, 7–9-septate, and measure 30–40 × 6–8 μm. Reported lichen products are protocetraric and virensic acids.

== Habitat and distribution ==
Ocellularia protoinspersa was originally known from the type locality at Los Amigos Research and Training Center in Madre de Dios, Peru, where it was collected at about 270 m (890 ft) elevation in tropical lowland rain forest, growing on tree bark in secondary forest. It has since been recorded in Mato Grosso, Brazil.

== See also ==
- List of Ocellularia species
