= Ocellularia aptrootiana =

Scientific classification
- Domain: Eukaryota
- Kingdom: Fungi
- Division: Ascomycota
- Class: Lecanoromycetes
- Order: Graphidales
- Family: Graphidaceae
- Genus: Ocellularia
- Species: O. aptrootiana

Binomial name
- Ocellularia aptrootiana Weerakoon, Lücking & Lumbsch (2014)

Species of lichen

Ocellularia aptrootiana is a species of corticolous lichen in the family Graphidaceae. Found in Sri Lanka, it was formally described as a new species in 2014 by lichenologists Gothamie Weerakoon, Robert Lücking, and Helge Thorsten Lumbsch. The type specimen was collected from Mahailluppallama (Anuradhapura, North Central Province) at an altitude of 170 m (560 ft). Here, in a low-altitude, dry, semi-evergreen forest, it was found growing around a water tank. The specific epithet aptrootiana honours Dutch lichenologist André Aptroot, "for his important contributions to tropical lichenology and his help with the research by the first author". Ocellularia aptrootiana has a grey, smooth to uneven or cracked thallus up to convert 5 cm (2 in) in diameter. The ascospores are hyaline, ellipsoid in shape, contain seven septa, and measure 20–25 by 6–7 μm. Secondary chemicals present in the lichen include psoromic acid, subpsoromic acid, and 2’-O-demethylpsoromic acids.

== See also ==
- List of Ocellularia species
