= Ocellularia natashae =

Scientific classification
- Kingdom: Fungi
- Division: Ascomycota
- Class: Lecanoromycetes
- Order: Graphidales
- Family: Graphidaceae
- Genus: Ocellularia
- Species: O. natashae

Binomial name
- Ocellularia natashae Rivas Plata & Lücking (2012)
- Type locality: Los Amigos Biological Station, Peru

Species of lichen-forming fungus

Ocellularia natashae is a species of crustose lichen-forming fungus in the family Graphidaceae. It is an olive-green lichen that grows on tree bark in lowland tropical rainforest in Madre de Dios, Peru. The species was described in 2012 and is characterised by its long, many-celled ascospores and an oil-droplet-filled spore-bearing layer.

== Taxonomy ==
Ocellularia natashae was described as a new species by Eimy Rivas Plata and Robert Lücking in 2012, based on material collected at the Los Amigos Research and Training Center (CICRA) in Madre de Dios, Peru. The species epithet natashae was chosen in honor of the authors' daughter Natasha.

In a three-gene phylogenetic analysis of Ocellularia (in the strict sense), Thai material previously treated as Ocellularia aff. fumosa was recovered close to O. natashae and O. thryptica. The authors contrasted these taxa by reporting that O. thryptica has a clear hymenium and contains protocetraric acid, whereas O. natashae has longer ascospores and contains the hirtifructic acid chemosyndrome.

== Description ==
This species is a crustose lichen with an olive-green thallus up to 3 cm across and about 60–90 μm thick. The surface is uneven to coarsely warty, and the photobiont is the green alga Trentepohlia. Calcium oxalate crystals are present in the photobiont layer and medulla, and the medulla is white.

The fruiting bodies (apothecia) partly protrude from the thallus (erumpent) and are 0.4–0.6 mm in diameter, with a pore-like opening 0.15–0.25 mm wide and a central column (columella) with a white tip. The spore-bearing layer (hymenium) is densely filled with oil droplets (strongly inspersed). The asci are spindle-shaped (fusiform), measuring 100–140 × 15–20 μm. The ascospores are colorless, oblong, and divided into 12–16 cells (11–15-septate), measuring 30–50 × 8–10 μm. They stain violet-blue with iodine (I+ violet-blue). Chemical analyses detected hirtifructic and conhirtifructic acids, along with an unidentified substance referred to as the "main cinchonarum unknown".

== Habitat and distribution ==
Ocellularia natashae is known from tropical lowland rainforest at the Los Amigos Research and Training Center in Madre de Dios, Peru, where it was collected on tree bark in secondary forest at about 270 m (890 ft) elevation.

== See also ==
- List of Ocellularia species
