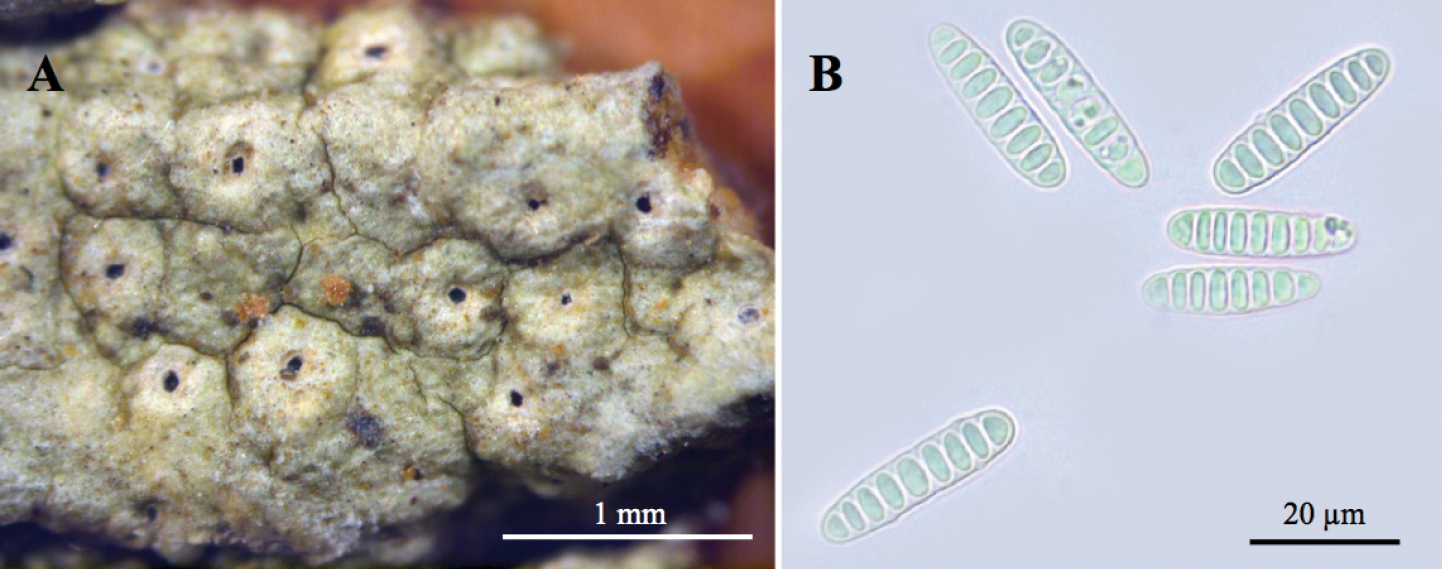
- Morphology and anatomy of O. phatamensis. A habitat of ascomata, B ascospores. Scale bar A = 1 mm, B = 20 μm

Scientific classification
- Kingdom: Fungi
- Division: Ascomycota
- Class: Lecanoromycetes
- Order: Graphidales
- Family: Graphidaceae
- Genus: Ocellularia
- Species: O. phatamensis

Binomial name
- Ocellularia phatamensis Naksuwankul, Parnmen & Lumbsch (2016)
- Type locality: Pha Taem National Park, Thailand

= Ocellularia phatamensis =

Species of lichen-forming fungus

Ocellularia phatamensis is a species of corticolous (bark-dwelling) crustose lichen-forming fungus in the family Graphidaceae. It is a grayish, bark-dwelling lichen with small, rounded fruiting bodies partly sunken in the thallus surface, known from dry evergreen forest in northeastern Thailand. The species was described in 2016 and is named after the national park where it was first collected.

== Taxonomy ==
Ocellularia phatamensis was described as new from Thailand in 2016 by Khwanruan Naksuwankul, Sittiporn Parnmen, and Helge Thorsten Lumbsch. The species epithet phatamensis refers to Pha Taem National Park in Ubon Ratchathani province, Thailand, where the species was first collected by Khwanruan Papong on 12 April 2013. The species was compared with the similar O. krathingensis, from which it differs in having a thicker, grayish thallus with a finely cracked surface.

== Description ==
The lichen body (thallus) grows on bark and forms a continuous crust up to about 5 cm across. It is grayish and uneven, ranging from warty (verrucose) to finely cracked (rimose), with a white inner tissue (medulla) and no visible border zone (prothallus). In cross-section, the thallus is about 60–75 μm thick and contains scattered clusters of calcium oxalate crystals. The algal partner (photobiont) is from the green algal genus Trentepohlia, with cells about 8–10 × 6–7 μm.

The fruiting bodies (ascomata) are rounded and partly protruding from the thallus (erumpent), with a complete covering of thallus tissue (thalline margin), measuring about 0.4–0.7 mm across and 0.15–0.2 mm high. The disc is hidden beneath a small pore-like opening about 0.07–0.1 mm wide, which is often partly filled by a central column (columella) with a black tip (the columella may be sunken). The spore-bearing layer (hymenium) is colourless (hyaline) and about 120–150 μm high. Each ascus contains eight spores and measures about 100–110 × 12–15 μm. The ascospores are oval (ellipsoid), colourless, and divided into 8–9 cells (7–8-septate), measuring about 25–30 × 7.5–8 μm; they stain violet with iodine.

== Habitat and distribution ==
The species is known from Pha Taem National Park in Ubon Ratchathani province, Thailand, where it was collected in dry evergreen forest at 124 m elevation, growing on bark near Sang Chan waterfall.

== See also ==
- List of Ocellularia species
