= Ocellularia subleucina =

Scientific classification
- Domain: Eukaryota
- Kingdom: Fungi
- Division: Ascomycota
- Class: Lecanoromycetes
- Order: Graphidales
- Family: Graphidaceae
- Genus: Ocellularia
- Species: O. subleucina

Binomial name
- Ocellularia subleucina Homchant. & Coppins (2002)

Species of lichen

Ocellularia subleucina is a species of corticolous (bark-dwelling) lichen in the family Graphidaceae. Found in south-eastern Thailand, it was formally described as a new species in 2002 by lichenologists Natsurang Homchantara and Brian J. Coppins. The type specimen was collected in Khao Khitchakut National Park (Chanthaburi Province); here it was found growing on trees in a lowland forest at an elevation of 400 m (1,300 ft). The lichen has a smooth to finely wrinkled, grey olivaceous thallus with a dense cortex and a white medulla. It does not contain any lichen substances. The specific epithet subleucina refers to its similarity with Ocellularia leucina, a lookalike species with smaller ascospores that contains psoromic acid.

== See also ==
- List of Ocellularia species
