= Ocellularia roseotecta =

Scientific classification
- Domain: Eukaryota
- Kingdom: Fungi
- Division: Ascomycota
- Class: Lecanoromycetes
- Order: Graphidales
- Family: Graphidaceae
- Genus: Ocellularia
- Species: O. roseotecta

Binomial name
- Ocellularia roseotecta Homchant. & Coppins (2002)

Species of lichen

Ocellularia roseotecta is a species of corticolous (bark-dwelling) lichen in the family Graphidaceae. Found in Malaysia, it was formally described as a new species in 2002 by lichenologists Natsurang Homchantara and Brian J. Coppins. The type specimen was collected by the second author in Gunung Mulu National Park (Sarawak); here it was found growing on young trees in a heath forest at an elevation of 150 m (490 ft). It is only known to occur at the type locality. The lichen has a whitish-brown, irregularly cracked thallus and a medulla that is coloured from white to pale pink. The specific epithet roseotecta refers to the pink pigment of the medulla.

== See also ==
- List of Ocellularia species
