= Ocellularia diminuta =

Scientific classification
- Kingdom: Fungi
- Division: Ascomycota
- Class: Lecanoromycetes
- Order: Graphidales
- Family: Graphidaceae
- Genus: Ocellularia
- Species: O. diminuta

Binomial name
- Ocellularia diminuta M.Cáceres, Aptroot & Lücking (2014)
- Holotype: Porto Velho, Brazil

Species of lichen

Ocellularia diminuta is a corticolous (bark-dwelling), crustose lichen in the family Graphidaceae. The species was described in 2014 from primary rainforest near Porto Velho in Rondônia, Brazil, where it grows on tree bark in shaded understory conditions. It forms olive-green patches with a slightly bumpy surface and produces small, rounded fruiting bodies that often lack a central column. The lichen is distinguished from similar species by its smaller size and shorter ascospores, and remains known only from its original collection locality.

== Taxonomy ==
The species was described in 2014 by Marcela Cáceres, André Aptroot, and Robert Lücking as part of a survey of Graphidaceae in Rondônia, Brazil. The holotype was collected in March 2012 at the Parque Natural Municipal de Porto Velho on tree bark in primary rainforest; it is housed at ISE (Herbário da Universidade Federal de Sergipe).

In their diagnosis the authors compared Ocellularia diminuta with O. papillata: the new species has smaller, rounded, columella-lacking (ecolumellate) ascomata, whereas O. papillata has larger apothecia with a developed columella. They further noted that the only other ecolumellate species in the genus with an uncarbonized excipulum and small, transversely septate ascospores is O. albocincta, which differs in having a much thicker, whitish thallus, almost immersed ascomata, and longer ascospores (about twice as long).

== Description ==
The thallus is corticolous and epiperidermal, up to about 5 cm across, with a surface that is smooth but bears scattered to dense, low verrucose bumps and short ridges; it is olive-green and lacks a visible prothallus. In section the thallus is 30–50 μm thick, with a prosoplectenchymatous cortex 5–10 μm thick, a photobiont layer 15–20 μm thick, and a 20–30 μm medulla containing numerous small crystals and clusters of calcium oxalate. The Trentepohlia photobiont has cells roughly 7–11 × 6–9 μm.

The apothecia are rounded to slightly irregular and few in number, often absent from much of the thallus; they are erumpent with a complete thalline margin, measuring 0.3–0.5 mm in diameter and 0.15–0.2 mm high. The disc is covered by a 0.05–0.07 mm pore, so the disc is not visible externally; the excipulum is entire, prosoplectenchymatous, yellowish, and 15–20 μm wide; a columella is absent. The hymenium is 90–100 μm high and clear, with a 5–10 μm epithecium that is indistinct; the hypothecium is hyaline. Paraphyses are unbranched with smooth tips; periphysoids are absent.

Ascospores (numbering eight per ascus) are ellipsoid, 5-septate, 12–15 × 5–6 μm (2–3 times as long as wide), hyaline, and distoseptate with lens-shaped lumina; in iodine they stain I+ violet-blue (amyloid). No secondary metabolites were detected by thin-layer chromatography; the medulla is P–, and microscopic section is K–.

== Habitat and distribution ==
The species is known from primary rainforest in Rondônia, Brazil, where it grows on smooth tree bark in shaded understory conditions near Porto Velho at around 100 m elevation. As of 2025, it has not been recorded elsewhere in Brazil.

== See also ==
- List of Ocellularia species
