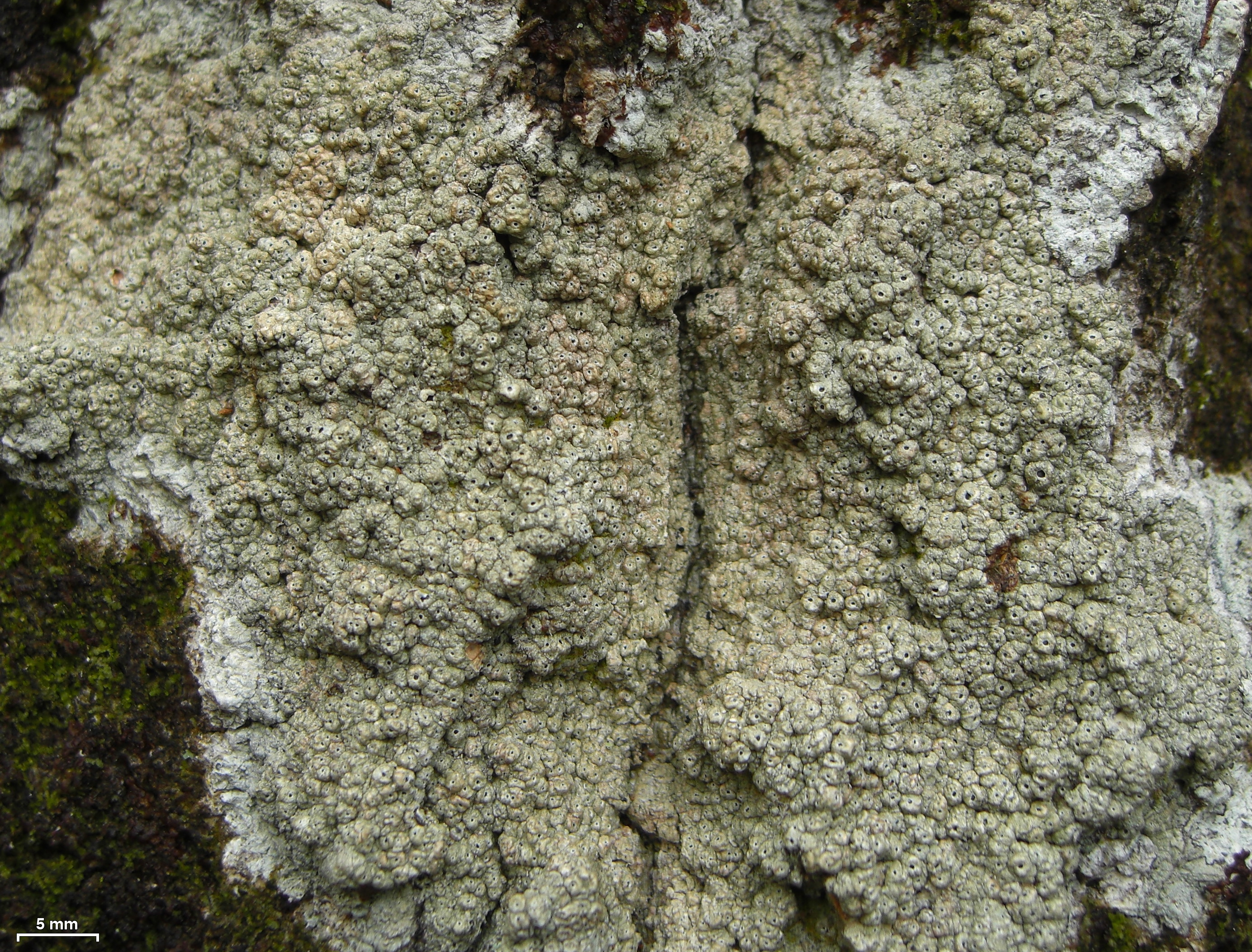

Scientific classification
- Kingdom: Fungi
- Division: Ascomycota
- Class: Lecanoromycetes
- Order: Graphidales
- Family: Graphidaceae
- Genus: Ocellularia
- Species: O. americana

Binomial name
- Ocellularia americana Hale (1973)

= Ocellularia americana =

Species of lichen

Ocellularia americana is a species of crustose lichen in the family Graphidaceae. Found in the southern United States, it was formally described as a new species in 1973 by Mason Hale. This bark-dwelling lichen forms pale, cream-colored to whitish warted patches on oak trees and is distinguished by its prominent disc-shaped fruiting bodies with distinctive central columns. It is the only member of its family known to produce gyrophoric acid, which gives it a unique chemical signature among related species.

== Taxonomy ==
Ocellularia americana was described as a new species in 1974 by Mason Hale, based on a specimen collected near Daytona Beach, Florida in 1911 by George Knox Merrill. Before its description, the species had often been misidentified in herbaria as Ocellularia domingensis. Hale noted that the true O. domingensis from the Caribbean differs by containing different lichen substances (hypoprotocetraric acid) and by lacking a central column (columella) in the apothecia. In contrast, O. americana has prominent columellae and produces gyrophoric acid, making it the only known member of its family with a C+ reacting substance.

Because of these differences in both chemistry and morphology, Hale concluded that the southeastern U.S. material represented a distinct species rather than a regional form of O. domingensis. The holotype is preserved in the United States National Herbarium (US), with additional specimens subsequently reported from multiple states in the southeastern United States.

== Description ==
Ocellularia americana is a bark-dwelling lichen that forms pale, cream-colored to whitish patches on tree trunks. Its thallus (the main body) is continuous and strongly warted, usually 3–5 cm across. The surface is uneven and covered with conspicuous, raised apothecia (disc-like fruiting bodies), each 1–2 mm in diameter. These discs are rounded, with a central column (columella) that is clearly visible, about 0.2 mm wide, and often dusted with a whitish bloom (pruina). Inside, the spore-bearing layer (hymenium) is around 200 μm thick.

The ascospores are colorless, elongated, and divided by 18–22 cross walls (septae), measuring about 20–35 by 100–130 μm. Chemically, the species is unusual within its group because it produces gyrophoric acid along with unidentified pigments; it is the only member of its family known to contain a C+ lichen substance. This combination of a warted thallus, prominent apothecia with a columella, and distinctive chemistry helps distinguish O. americana from other species that it had often been confused with in the past.

== Habitat and distribution ==
Ocellularia americana appears to be endemic to the southern United States, where it is fairly common on the bark of oak trees in open woodlands and pastures. It was originally described from near Daytona, Florida, and subsequent collections have been reported from several southeastern states, including South Carolina, Georgia, Alabama, Florida, Mississippi, and Louisiana. The species is encountered more often in well-lit, exposed habitats rather than shaded forest interiors.

== See also ==
- List of Ocellularia species
