= Ocellularia pluriporoides =

Scientific classification
- Domain: Eukaryota
- Kingdom: Fungi
- Division: Ascomycota
- Class: Lecanoromycetes
- Order: Graphidales
- Family: Graphidaceae
- Genus: Ocellularia
- Species: O. pluriporoides

Binomial name
- Ocellularia pluriporoides Homchant. & Coppins (2002)

Species of lichen

Ocellularia pluriporoides is a species of corticolous (bark-dwelling) lichen in the family Graphidaceae. Found in Northern Thailand, it was formally described as a new species in 2002 by lichenologists Natsurang Homchantara and Brian J. Coppins. The type specimen was collected in Doi Suthep National Park (Chiang Mai Province) at an elevation of 1,600 m (5,200 ft); here, in an oak/chestnut forest, it was found growing on the trunk of Vaccinium sprengelii.

The lichen has a shiny and smooth, greenish-grey thallus with a dense cortex and a white medulla. Its thin-walled, colourless ascospores are shaped like narrow ellipsoids, typically measuring 34.5–45.5 long by 7.5–9.0 μm wide. It contains psoromic acid, a secondary compound. The specific epithet pluriporoides refers to its resemblance to Ocellularia pluripora. This lookalike species has smaller spores that are 12-16 μm long.

== See also ==
- List of Ocellularia species
