= Ocellularia brasiliensis =

Scientific classification
- Kingdom: Fungi
- Division: Ascomycota
- Class: Lecanoromycetes
- Order: Graphidales
- Family: Graphidaceae
- Genus: Ocellularia
- Species: O. brasiliensis

Binomial name
- Ocellularia brasiliensis M.Cáceres, Aptroot & Lücking (2014)
- Holotype: Porto Velho, Brazil

Species of lichen

Ocellularia brasiliensis is a corticolous (bark-dwelling), crustose lichen in the family Graphidaceae. The species was described in 2014 from primary rainforest near Porto Velho in Rondônia, Brazil, where it grows on tree bark in shaded understory conditions. It forms uneven gray patches with whitish to light yellow-green powdery structures and has rounded fruiting bodies with a black central column. It differs from O. africana in having a blackened (carbonized) apothecial wall and central column (columella), and in producing a distinctive yellow lichen substance ("cinchonarum unknown").

== Taxonomy ==
The species was described in 2014 by Marcela Cáceres, André Aptroot, and Robert Lücking as part of a survey of Graphidaceae diversity in Rondônia, Brazil. The holotype was collected on March 8, 2012 at the Federal University of Rondônia campus south of Porto Velho on tree bark in primary rainforest; it is housed at ISE (Herbário da Universidade Federal de Sergipe).

In their diagnosis the authors contrasted O. brasiliensis with O. africana: the new species has a carbonized excipulum and columella and a "cinchonarum unknown" chemistry, whereas O. africana has uncarbonized apothecial structures and a different chemical profile.

== Description ==
The thallus is corticolous and epiperidermal, forming uneven, grey patches that are sorediate; the maculate soredia (soralia) are dispersed to clustered and measure about 0.3–0.6 mm across, whitish to light yellow-green, with no evident prothallus. In section the thallus is 50–80 μm thick with a paraplectenchymatous cortex 10–15 μm thick, a photobiont layer 30–50 μm thick of Trentepohlia whose cells are roughly 7–11 × 6–9 μm, and a thin, irregular medulla containing scattered calcium oxalate clusters.

The apothecia are rounded, erumpent to prominent, with an almost complete thalline margin 0.5–0.8 mm in diameter and 0.2–0.25 mm high. The disc is covered by a 0.2–0.4 mm pore largely filled by a black, broad-stump-shaped columella (about 300–400 μm wide, 100–120 μm high). The excipulum is entire and carbonized (30–60 μm wide); the hymenium forms a narrow, clear ring 90–100 μm high around the columella; the hypothecium is hyaline and prosoplectenchymatous. Paraphyses are unbranched and smooth; periphysoids are absent.

Ascospores (eight per ascus) are ellipsoid, 7–9-septate, 20–28 × 6–7 μm, hyaline, and distoseptate with lens-shaped lumina; they stain iodine-positive (I+) violet-blue (amyloid). The chemistry includes a "cinchonarum unknown" lichen substance; the medulla is P+ (red) and the microscopic section is K–.

== Habitat and distribution ==
Ocellularia brasiliensis was originally known from primary rainforest in Rondônia, Brazil, where it grows on smooth tree bark in shaded understory conditions near Porto Velho at around 100 m elevation. It has since been recorded in Mato Grosso.

== See also ==
- List of Ocellularia species
