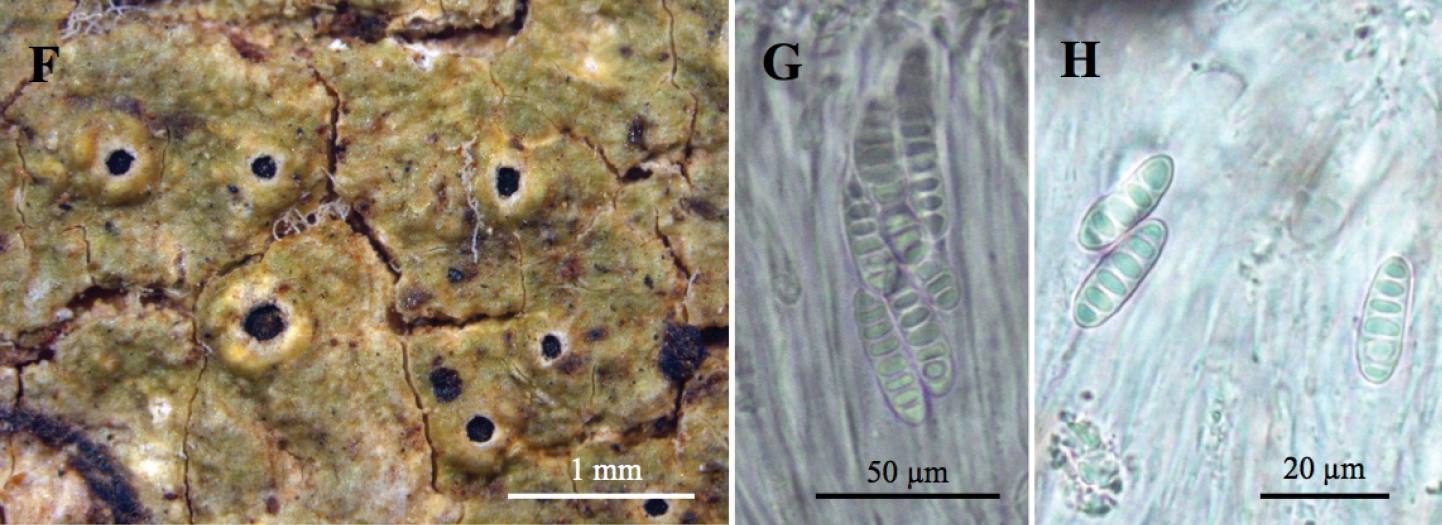
- Morphology and anatomy of O. thailandica. F: habitat of ascomata, G: ascus with ascospores, and H: ascospores (holotype). Scale bar F = 1 mm, G = 50 μm, H = 20 μm

Scientific classification
- Kingdom: Fungi
- Division: Ascomycota
- Class: Lecanoromycetes
- Order: Graphidales
- Family: Graphidaceae
- Genus: Ocellularia
- Species: O. thailandica

Binomial name
- Ocellularia thailandica Naksuwankul, Kraichak & Lumbsch (2016)
- Type locality: Pha Taem National Park, Thailand

= Ocellularia thailandica =

Species of lichen-forming fungus

Ocellularia thailandica is a species of corticolous (bark-dwelling), crustose lichen-forming fungus in the family Graphidaceae. It is a light yellowish green, bark-dwelling lichen with small, rounded fruiting bodies that are partly sunken in the thallus surface, known only from dry evergreen forest in northeastern Thailand. The species was described in 2016 on the basis of both morphological and molecular evidence, and is reported as closely related to Ocellularia albocincta.

== Taxonomy ==
Ocellularia thailandica was described as a new species by Khwanruan Naksuwankul, Ekaphan Kraichak, and Helge Thorsten Lumbsch in 2016. The species epithet refers to Thailand, where the type specimen was collected. Molecular data (mtSSU rDNA, nrLSU rDNA, and RPB2) were used in the study that described the species, and the authors reported that it is closely related to Ocellularia albocincta.

== Description ==
Ocellularia thailandica is a bark-dwelling lichen with a body (thallus) that grows on the bark surface (epiperidermal) and reaches up to about 5 cm across. The thallus is continuous, light yellowish green, and has an uneven, warty to cracked surface. The inner tissue (medulla) is white, and no visible border zone (prothallus) is present. In cross-section, the thallus is 40–60 μm thick and consists of a thin outer skin (cortex, 5–7 μm), an algal layer (photobiont layer, 15–25 μm), and a medulla (20–30 μm) with scattered clusters of calcium oxalate crystals. The algal photosynthetic partner (photobiont) is the green alga Trentepohlia, with cells about 7–8 × 5–9 μm.

The fruiting bodies (ascomata) are rounded and partly protruding from the thallus (erumpent), with a complete covering of thallus tissue (thalline margin), measuring 0.3–0.5 mm across and 0.12–0.2 mm high. The disc is hidden beneath a small pore-like opening 0.05–0.1 mm wide, ringed by a whitish rim. A finger-like, blackened (carbonized) central column (columella) is present, up to 100 μm broad and 120–135 μm high. The spore-bearing layer (hymenium) is clear and 125–140 μm high. The asci are cylindrical to narrowly club-shaped (clavate), 87–100 × 12–15 μm, each containing eight colourless (hyaline), oval (ellipsoid) ascospores. The spores are divided into 6–8 cells (5–7-septate) and measure 20–23 × 7–8 μm, with thick cross-walls and lens-shaped internal spaces (distoseptate with lens-shaped lumina). They stain violet-blue with iodine (I+ violet-blue). Pycnidia (asexual fruiting bodies) were not observed, and no lichen substances were detected by thin-layer chromatography.

== Habitat and distribution ==
The species is known from northeastern Thailand, where it was collected on bark in dry evergreen forest at 245 m elevation in Pha Taem National Park (Ubon Ratchathani Province). It is reported only from the type locality.

== See also ==
- List of Ocellularia species
