= Ocellularia brunneospora =

Scientific classification
- Domain: Eukaryota
- Kingdom: Fungi
- Division: Ascomycota
- Class: Lecanoromycetes
- Order: Graphidales
- Family: Graphidaceae
- Genus: Ocellularia
- Species: O. brunneospora

Binomial name
- Ocellularia brunneospora Homchant. & Coppins (2002)

Species of lichen

Ocellularia brunneospora is a species of corticolous (bark-dwelling) lichen in the family Graphidaceae. Found in Thailand, it was formally described as a new species in 2002 by lichenologists Natsurang Homchantara and Brian J. Coppins. The type specimen was collected in the Namtok Phlio National Park (Chanthaburi Province); here, in a moist evergreen forest at an elevation of 100 m (330 ft), the lichen was found growing on the bark of Anisoptera costata. Ocellularia brunneospora is only known to occur at the type locality.

The lichen has a smooth and shiny, olive-grey thallus with a dense cortex, a continuous algal layer and a white medulla. Its apothecia are about 0.7 mm in diameter with a white-rimmed, round pore and carbonized (blackened) exciple. The ascospores are ellipsoid, thin walled and brown, and typically measure 11–13 by 6–7 μm. Ocellularia croceospora is similar in morphology, but differs in having colourless ascospores.

== See also ==
- List of Ocellularia species
