= Ocellularia raveniana =

Scientific classification
- Domain: Eukaryota
- Kingdom: Fungi
- Division: Ascomycota
- Class: Lecanoromycetes
- Order: Graphidales
- Family: Graphidaceae
- Genus: Ocellularia
- Species: O. raveniana

Binomial name
- Ocellularia raveniana Weerakoon, Lücking & Lumbsch (2014)

Species of lichen

Ocellularia raveniana is a species of corticolous lichen in the family Graphidaceae. Found in Sri Lanka, it was formally described as a new species in 2014 by lichenologists Gothamie Weerakoon, Robert Lücking, and Helge Thorsten Lumbsch. The type specimen was collected from a high-elevation tea estate in Matale (Central Province) at an altitude of 1,360 m (4,460 ft). The lichen is only known to occur at the type locality and in the Sabaragamuwa Mountain Range. The specific epithet raveniana honours botanist and environmentalist Peter H. Raven, longtime director and now President Emeritus of the Missouri Botanical Garden. Ocellularia raveniana has a cream-colored to white thallus up to 10 cm (4 in) in diameter, with an uneven to somewhat verrucose (warty) surface. Its ascospores are hyaline, oblong to ellipsoid in shape, contain seven to nine septa, and measure 25–35 by 8–10 μm. Secondary chemicals present in the lichen include protocetraric acid, and virensic acid.

== See also ==
- List of Ocellularia species
