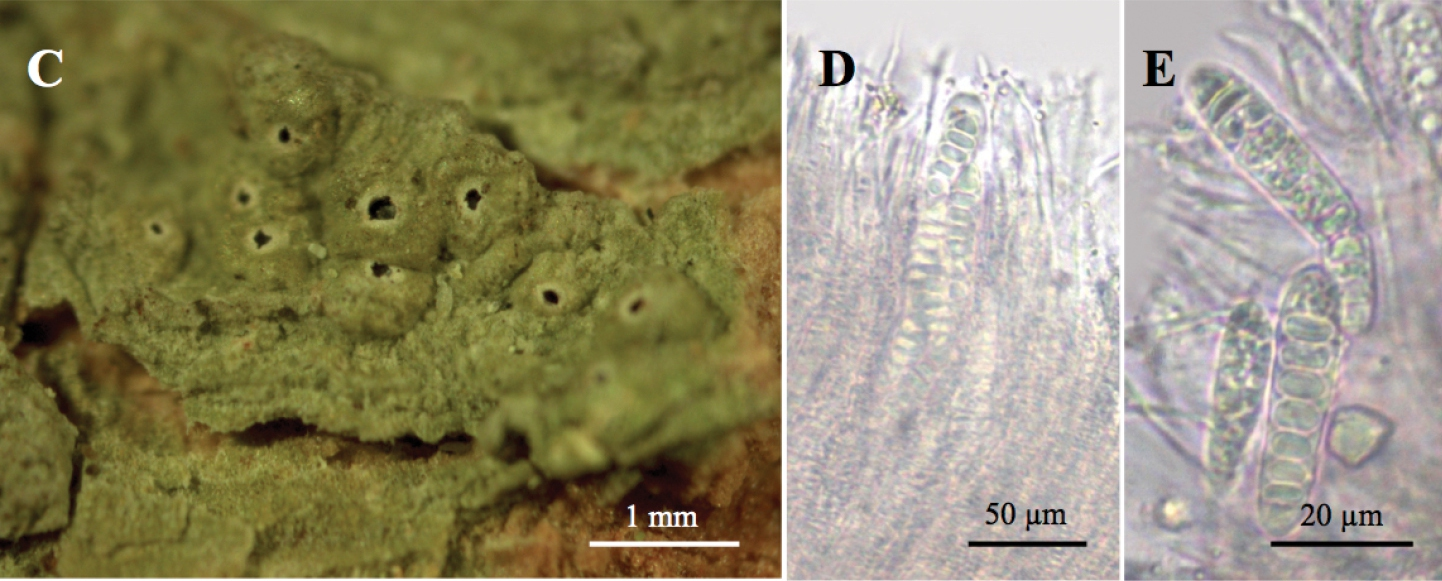
- Morphology and anatomy of O. rotundifumosa. C ascomata, D hymenium with ascus, and E ascospores (holotype MSUT). Scale bar C = 1 mm, D = 50 μm, E = 20 μm

Scientific classification
- Kingdom: Fungi
- Division: Ascomycota
- Class: Lecanoromycetes
- Order: Graphidales
- Family: Graphidaceae
- Genus: Ocellularia
- Species: O. rotundifumosa

Binomial name
- Ocellularia rotundifumosa Naksuwankul, Lücking & Lumbsch (2016)
- Type locality: Pha Taem National Park, Thailand

= Ocellularia rotundifumosa =

Species of lichen-forming fungus

Ocellularia rotundifumosa is a species of lichen-forming fungus in the family Graphidaceae. It is a greenish gray to olive, bark-dwelling lichen with rounded, sometimes urn-shaped fruiting bodies, known from dry evergreen forest in northeastern Thailand. The species was described in 2016 and is distinguished from the similar Ocellularia fumosa by its ascospores, which have rounded rather than pointed ends.

== Taxonomy ==
Ocellularia rotundifumosa was described as a new species in 2016 from Thailand. It was distinguished from the similar O. fumosa by its ascospores, which have rounded ends. Molecular data were used alongside morphological characters in the study that described the species, and a DNA sequence from a Thai specimen (Papong 8576) was included in the authors' sampling of Ocellularia (in the strict sense).

== Description ==
The thallus grows on bark and ranges from embedded within the bark (endophloeodal) to sitting on its surface (epiphloeodal), reaching up to about 200 μm thick. It is greenish gray to olive, slightly glossy, and usually somewhat warty (verrucose). A true outer skin (cortex) is discontinuous and up to about 15 μm thick. The algal partner (photobiont) is from the green algal genus Trentepohlia, with cells about 7–9 × 6–9 μm. Vegetative reproductive structures (propagules) and asexual fruiting bodies (pycnidia) were not observed.

The fruiting bodies (ascomata) are rounded with a complete covering of thallus tissue (thalline margin), 0.4–0.9 mm in diameter, and range from sunken in the thallus to rather prominently raised, sometimes becoming warty-hemispherical to urn-shaped (urceolate). The disc is dark gray and may show the central column (columella) from above. The spore-bearing layer (hymenium) is up to about 150 μm thick and densely filled with oil droplets (inspersed). Each ascus contains eight colourless (hyaline) ascospores that are spindle-shaped to oblong-spindle-shaped (fusiform to oblong-fusiform, rarely club-shaped or clavate), 24–35 × 7–10 μm, with rounded ends; they stain violet-blue with iodine. No secondary metabolites were detected by thin-layer chromatography.

== Habitat and distribution ==
The species is known from Thailand, where the type collection was made in Pha Taem National Park (Ubon Ratchathani Province) at 124 m elevation in dry evergreen forest, growing on bark near Sang Chan waterfall.

== See also ==
- List of Ocellularia species
