= Ocellularia rhicnoporoides =

Scientific classification
- Domain: Eukaryota
- Kingdom: Fungi
- Division: Ascomycota
- Class: Lecanoromycetes
- Order: Graphidales
- Family: Graphidaceae
- Genus: Ocellularia
- Species: O. rhicnoporoides

Binomial name
- Ocellularia rhicnoporoides Homchant. & Coppins (2002)

Species of lichen

Ocellularia rhicnoporoides is a species of corticolous (bark-dwelling) lichen in the family Graphidaceae. Found in south-eastern Thailand, it was formally described as a new species in 2002 by lichenologists Natsurang Homchantara and Brian J. Coppins. The type specimen was collected by the first author in Namtok Phlio National Park (Chanthaburi Province). The lichen has a somewhat shiny, smooth, olivaceous-buff thallus with a dense cortex and a white medulla. It produces colourless, thin-walled ascospores that measure 16.5–22.0 by 7.0–8.5 μm. The specific epithet rhicnoporoides alludes to its resemblance to Ocellularia rhicnopora.

== See also ==
- List of Ocellularia species
