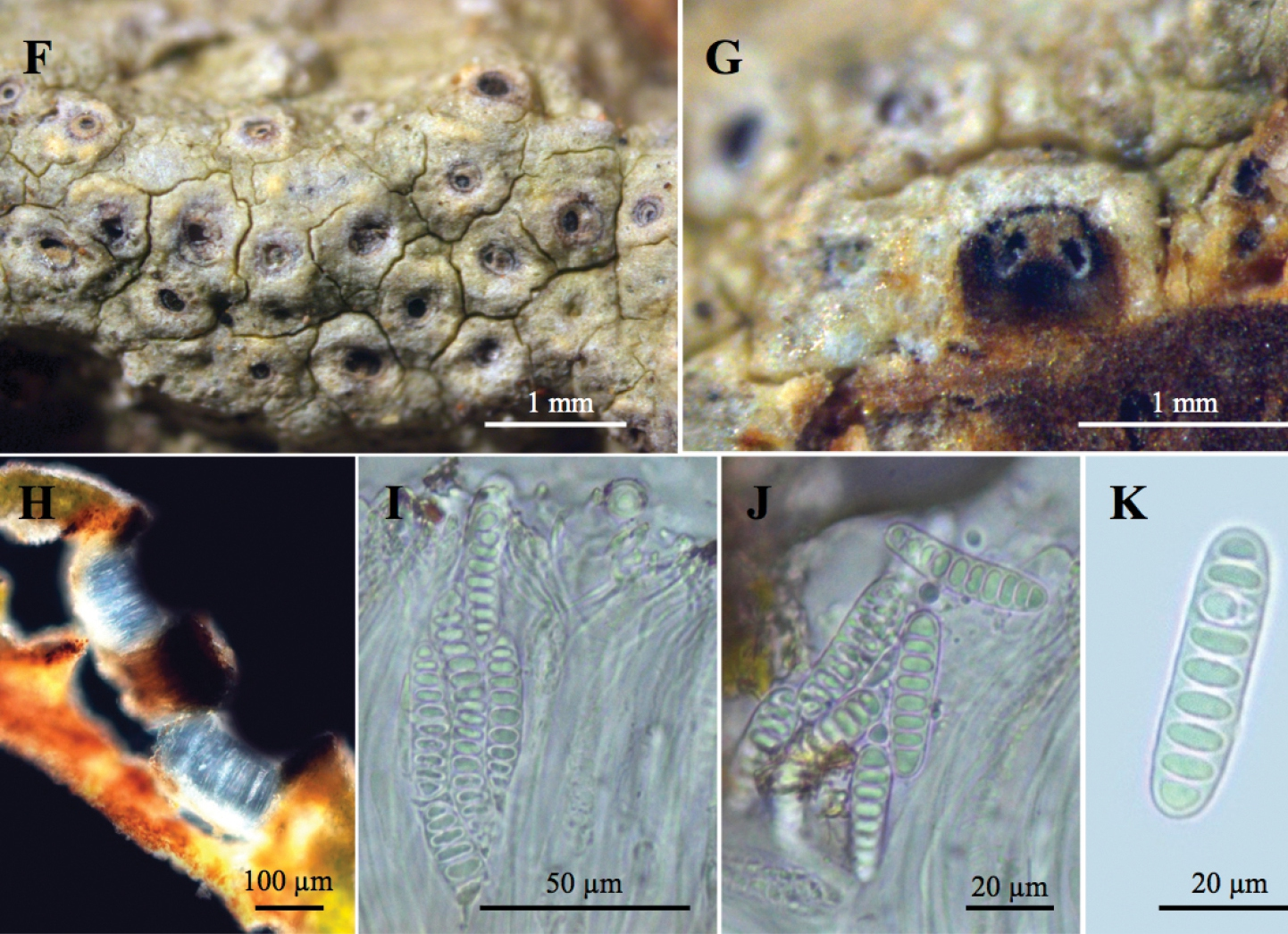
- Morphology and anatomy of O. klinhomii. F–G ascomata immersed in verrucae and surrounded by a black ring; H cross-section of ascoma with carbonised columella and apically carbonised exiple; I–K ascus and ascospores (holotype). Scale bar F–G = 1 mm, H = 100 μm, I = 50 μm, J–K = 20 μm.

Scientific classification
- Kingdom: Fungi
- Division: Ascomycota
- Class: Lecanoromycetes
- Order: Graphidales
- Family: Graphidaceae
- Genus: Ocellularia
- Species: O. klinhomii

Binomial name
- Ocellularia klinhomii Naksuwankul, Lücking & Lumbsch (2016)
- Type locality: Pha Taem National Park, Thailand

= Ocellularia klinhomii =

Species of lichen-forming fungus

Ocellularia klinhomii is a species of corticolous (bark-dwelling), crustose lichen-forming fungus in the family Graphidaceae. It is a whitish gray, bark-dwelling lichen with small fruiting bodies set within raised, dark-ringed bumps on the thallus surface, known from dry evergreen forest in northeastern Thailand. The species was described in 2016 and is named in honour of the Thai mycologist Winia Klinhom.

== Taxonomy ==
Ocellularia klinhomii was described as a new species of Graphidaceae from Thailand by Khwanruan Naksuwankul, Robert Lücking, and Helge Thorsten Lumbsch in 2016, based on both morphological characters and molecular data used to support its separation from similar taxa. The species epithet honors the Thai mycologist Winia Klinhom.

== Description ==
The body (thallus) grows on bark and forms a continuous crust up to about 5 cm across. Its surface is whitish gray and finely cracked (rimose), with a white inner tissue (medulla). No visible border zone (prothallus) is present. In cross-section, the thallus is about 30–40 μm thick and consists of an outer skin (cortex) of interwoven, elongated cells (prosoplectenchymatous, about 5–10 μm thick), an algal layer (about 15–20 μm), and a medulla (about 20–25 μm) with scattered clusters of calcium oxalate crystals. The algal partner (photobiont) is the green alga Trentepohlia, with cells about 7–9 × 6–8 μm.

The fruiting bodies (ascomata) are rounded and sit within warty raised bumps (verrucae) that are surrounded by a black ring; they range from partly protruding (erumpent) to sunken in the thallus and measure about 0.4–0.7 mm across and 0.15–0.2 mm high. The disc is hidden beneath a small pore-like opening about 0.05–0.1 mm wide, which is often partly filled by a central column (columella) with a black tip, though the columella may be sunken below the surface. The outer wall of the fruiting body (excipulum) is brown with a blackened (carbonized) upper portion, and is fused with the surrounding thallus-derived rim (thalline margin). A finger-like, blackened columella is present. The spore-bearing layer (hymenium) is clear and about 125–150 μm high. The asci are cylindrical to narrowly club-shaped (clavate), about 110–115 × 12–15 μm, each containing eight colourless (hyaline) ascospores. The ascospores are divided into 7–10 cells (6–9-septate) and measure 25–38 × 7–8 μm, with thick cross-walls and lens-shaped internal spaces (distoseptate with lens-shaped lumina); they stain violet-blue with iodine. Pycnidia (asexual fruiting bodies) were not observed.

== Habitat and distribution ==
The species is known from Thailand (Ubon Ratchathani province), where the type collection was made in Pha Taem National Park at Sang Chan waterfall at 124 m elevation. It was found in dry evergreen forest growing on bark.

== See also ==
- List of Ocellularia species
