= Ocellularia balangoda =

Scientific classification
- Domain: Eukaryota
- Kingdom: Fungi
- Division: Ascomycota
- Class: Lecanoromycetes
- Order: Graphidales
- Family: Graphidaceae
- Genus: Ocellularia
- Species: O. balangoda

Binomial name
- Ocellularia balangoda Weerakoon, Lücking & Lumbsch (2014)

Species of lichen

Ocellularia balangoda is a species of corticolous lichen in the family Graphidaceae. Found in Sri Lanka, it was formally described as a new species in 2014 by lichenologists Gothamie Weerakoon, Robert Lücking, and Helge Thorsten Lumbsch. The type specimen was collected from a high-altitude tea estate in Hunnasgiriya (Central Province) at an altitude of 1,240 m (4,070 ft); here it was found growing on tree trunks. The specific epithet refers to the prehistoric hominids known as Balangoda Man, who lived in Sri Lanka about 38,000 to 28,500 years ago. Ocellularia balangoda has a grey thallus up to 5 cm (2 in) in diameter, with a papillose (pimply) to verrucose (warty) textured surface. The ascospores are hyaline, ellipsoid in shape, contain seven septa, and measure 25–30 by 5–7 μm. Secondary chemicals present in the lichen include protocetraric acid and virensic acid.

== See also ==
- List of Ocellularia species
