= Ocellularia vizcayensis =

Scientific classification
- Kingdom: Fungi
- Division: Ascomycota
- Class: Lecanoromycetes
- Order: Graphidales
- Family: Graphidaceae
- Genus: Ocellularia
- Species: O. vizcayensis

Binomial name
- Ocellularia vizcayensis Rivas Plata, Duya & Lücking (2011)

Species of lichen

Ocellularia vizcayensis is a rare species of corticolous (bark-dwelling) lichen in the family Graphidaceae. It is known from a single collection made in Luzon, Philippines. The lichen thallus is a white, irregularly structured, areolate surface with a layer that includes a photosynthetic partner, both containing large calcium oxalate crystals. Its fruiting bodies are either embedded or protruding, round, with very narrow openings, and contain large, oblong, colorless spores that turn violet-blue when stained with iodine.

== Taxonomy ==
The lichen was formally described as new to science in 2011 by the lichenologists Eimy Rivas Plata, Melizar Duya, and Robert Lücking. The type specimen was collected by the first author on Luzon Island in the province of Nueva Vizcaya. The specimen was gathered from Mount Palali at an elevation of 1,400 m (4,600 ft), in March 2007. The species epithet alludes to the province of type locality.

== Description ==
Ocellularia vizcayensis has a white thallus that is areolate, meaning it has a loosely structured surface divided into irregular areas. The thallus is covered with a loose cortex, and both the layer containing the photobiont (photosynthetic partner) and the medulla (the inner layer) have large clusters of calcium oxalate crystals. The apothecia (fruiting bodies) are either immersed in the thallus or protruding from thalline warts. They are round, measuring 0.8 to 1.5 mm in diameter, and have a narrow pore only 0.05 to 0.1 mm wide. Surrounding the ostiole (the apothecial opening), there is a broad zone that is red-brown to purplish brown in color. A columella (an internal central pillar-like structure in some lichens) is absent. The excipulum, or the outer layer of the apothecium, is strongly carbonized on the sides, appearing jet-black and is 100 to 200 μm wide. The hymenium, which is the spore-bearing tissue layer, is clear and tall, ranging from 250 to 400 μm in height, with unbranched paraphyses. The ascospores are large, oblong to fusiform in shape, and range from 100 to 300 μm in length and 15 to 30 μm in width. They are colorless, with 15 to 29 septa, and have a violet-blue staining reaction to iodine. No lichen products were detected in the thallus by thin-layer chromatography.

Ocellularia fuscosporella, found in New Caledonia, is similar in overall appearance to O. vizcayensis but has brown ascospores. Thelotrema monosporum and related species also have superficial resemblance because of their whitish thallus and apothecia with brown rims, but can be distinguished by a differing internal anatomy, a lack of carbonization in the apothecia, the presence of periphysoids in the hymenium, and brown spores.

== Distribution and habitat ==
Ocellularia vizcayensis is known from a single, fully developed specimen found in an undisturbed lower montane rainforest of northern Luzon.

== See also ==
- List of Ocellularia species
