= Ocellularia peremergens =

Scientific classification
- Domain: Eukaryota
- Kingdom: Fungi
- Division: Ascomycota
- Class: Lecanoromycetes
- Order: Graphidales
- Family: Graphidaceae
- Genus: Ocellularia
- Species: O. peremergens

Binomial name
- Ocellularia peremergens Homchant. & Coppins (2002)

Species of lichen

Ocellularia peremergens is a species of corticolous (bark-dwelling) lichen in the family Graphidaceae. Found in Thailand, it was formally described as a new species in 2002 by lichenologists Natsurang Homchantara and Brian J. Coppins. The type specimen was collected from Doi Inthanon National Park (Chiang Mai Province) at an elevation of 2,450 m (8,040 ft). The lichen has a shiny, pale greenish-grey thallus with a finely verruculose (warted) texture and a white medulla. The apothecia occur solitarily, measuring 0.7–1.2 mm in diameter; they are emergent, meaning they project somewhat above the thallus surface. O. peremergens contains fumarprotocetraric acid, a secondary compound.
