= Ocellularia upretii =

Scientific classification
- Domain: Eukaryota
- Kingdom: Fungi
- Division: Ascomycota
- Class: Lecanoromycetes
- Order: Graphidales
- Family: Graphidaceae
- Genus: Ocellularia
- Species: O. upretii

Binomial name
- Ocellularia upretii S.Joshi, Divakar, Lumbsch & Lücking (2018)

Species of lichen

Ocellularia upretii is a species of corticolous (bark-dwelling) lichen in the family Graphidaceae. It is found in India.

== Taxonomy ==
The lichen was formally described as a new species in 2018 by Santosh Joshi, Pradeep Divakar, H. Thorsten Lumbsch, and Robert Lücking. The type was collected in the Shimoga District of central Western Ghats. The specific epithet upretii honours Indian lichenologist Dalip Kumar Upreti, "on the occasion of his retirement".

== Description ==
Ocellularia upretii has a greyish green to olivaceous green thallus with a well-developed cortex. The ascomata are numerous and scattered throughout the thallus, some immersed in the surface and some more prominent; all have rounded to oval pores. The proper exciple (the margin of the apothecium, lacking algal cells) is reddish brown. The ascospores have between 10 and 20 thick septa that section the spore transversely; the spores measure 100–125 by 15–25 μm. No secondary compounds were detected in the lichen using thin-layer chromatography, and all of the standard chemical spot tests are negative. Ocellularia allosporoides is a similar species that is phylogenetically distinct; unlike the substance-free O. upretii, it contains norisonotatic acid and norsubnotatic acid in its thallus.

== Distribution ==
Ocellularia upretii is widespread in evergreen forests of the Western Ghats, and tropical rainforests of Andaman and Nicobar Islands and the Eastern Himalayas.

== See also ==
- List of Ocellularia species
