= Ocellularia wolseleyana =

Scientific classification
- Domain: Eukaryota
- Kingdom: Fungi
- Division: Ascomycota
- Class: Lecanoromycetes
- Order: Graphidales
- Family: Graphidaceae
- Genus: Ocellularia
- Species: O. wolseleyana

Binomial name
- Ocellularia wolseleyana Homchant. & Coppins (2002)

Species of lichen

Ocellularia wolseleyana is a species of lichen in the family Graphidaceae. Found in Eastern Thailand, it was formally described as a new species in 2002 by lichenologists Natsurang Homchantara and Brian J. Coppins. The type specimen was collected by the first author in Khao Yai National Park (Nakhon Ratchasima Province) at an elevation of 830 m (2,720 ft). Here, in a mixed deciduous forest, the lichen was found growing on rock and on bark. It has a smooth and shiny, irregularly cracked thallus that ranges in colour from whitish mineral grey to olivaceous grey. It has a dense cortex and a white to creamy buff medulla. It contains psoromic acid, a secondary compound. Ocellularia neomasonhalei is similar in appearance to O. wolseleyana.
