= Ocellularia flavescens =

Scientific classification
- Domain: Eukaryota
- Kingdom: Fungi
- Division: Ascomycota
- Class: Lecanoromycetes
- Order: Graphidales
- Family: Graphidaceae
- Genus: Ocellularia
- Species: O. flavescens

Binomial name
- Ocellularia flavescens Homchant. & Coppins (2002)

Species of lichen

Ocellularia flavescens is a species of corticolous (bark-dwelling) lichen in the family Graphidaceae. Found in northern Thailand, it was formally described as a new species in 2002 by lichenologists Natsurang Homchantara and Brian J. Coppins. The type specimen was collected from Doi Suthep National Park (Chiang Mai Province); here it was found in an oak/chestnut forest at an elevation of 1,600 m (5,200 ft). It is only known from the type collection at the type locality. The lichen has shiny, smooth, whitish to mineral-grey thallus. It contains lichexanthone, a secondary compound that is uncommon in genus Ocellularia. The presence of this chemical causes the lichen thallus to fluoresce a golden-yellow colour when lit with a long-wavelength (365 nm) UV light. This feature is referenced in its specific epithet flavescens (Latin for "becoming yellow or golden").
