= Ocellularia inthanonensis =

Scientific classification
- Domain: Eukaryota
- Kingdom: Fungi
- Division: Ascomycota
- Class: Lecanoromycetes
- Order: Graphidales
- Family: Graphidaceae
- Genus: Ocellularia
- Species: O. inthanonensis

Binomial name
- Ocellularia inthanonensis Homchant. & Coppins (2002)

Species of lichen

Ocellularia inthanonensis is a species of corticolous (bark-dwelling) lichen in the family Graphidaceae. Found in northern Thailand, it was formally described as a new species in 2002 by lichenologists Natsurang Homchantara and Brian J. Coppins. The type specimen was collected from a tree trunk in a cloud forest in Doi Inthanon National Park (Chiang Mai Province) at an elevation of 2,450 m (8,040 ft). The specific epithet refers to the type locality. The lichen has a whitish mineral-grey thallus that is wrinkled and irregularly cracked.
