= Ocellularia neoperforata =

Scientific classification
- Domain: Eukaryota
- Kingdom: Fungi
- Division: Ascomycota
- Class: Lecanoromycetes
- Order: Graphidales
- Family: Graphidaceae
- Genus: Ocellularia
- Species: O. neoperforata

Binomial name
- Ocellularia neoperforata Homchant. & Coppins (2002)

Species of lichen

Ocellularia neoperforata is a rare species of corticolous (bark-dwelling) lichen in the family Graphidaceae. Found in Malaysia, it was formally described as a new species in 2002 by lichenologists Natsurang Homchantara and Brian J. Coppins. The type specimen was collected by the second author from Gunung Mulu National Park (Sarawak) at an elevation of about 100 m (330 ft); here, it was found in a heath forest growing on a young tree. It is only known from the type collection at the type locality. The lichen has a shiny and smooth, greenish-grey thallus with a dense cortex and a white medulla. Its ascospores are trans-septate, narrowly ellipsoid, and measure 11–15 μm long. It contains fumarprotocetraric acid, a secondary compound. Ocellularia perforata is a lookalike species after which O. neoperforata is named. In contrast to the latter lichen, it has larger ascospores, less emergent apothecia, and contains protocetraric acid.
