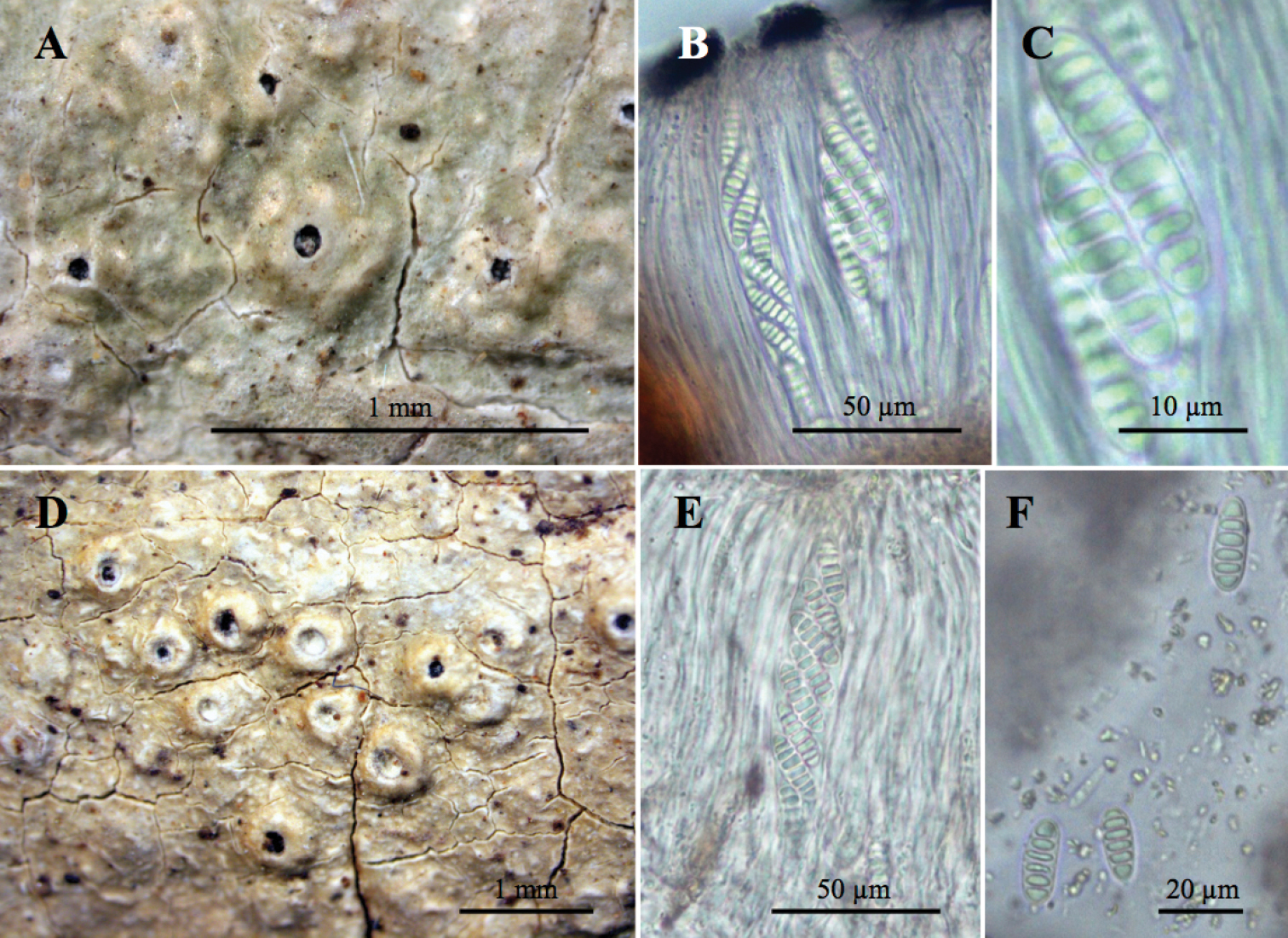
- Morphology and anatomy of Ocellularia krathingensis (A–F); A habitat of ascomata, B hymenium with ascus, and C ascospores. (D–F) D erumpent ascomata, E ascus, and F ascospores. Scale bar A, D = 1 mm, B, E = 50 µm, C, F = 20 µm.

Scientific classification
- Domain: Eukaryota
- Kingdom: Fungi
- Division: Ascomycota
- Class: Lecanoromycetes
- Order: Graphidales
- Family: Graphidaceae
- Genus: Ocellularia
- Species: O. krathingensis

Binomial name
- Ocellularia krathingensis Homchant. & Coppins (2002)

= Ocellularia krathingensis =

Species of lichen

Ocellularia krathingensis is a species of corticolous (bark-dwelling) lichen in the family Graphidaceae. Found in Thailand, it was formally described as a new species in 2002 by lichenologists Natsurang Homchantara and Brian J. Coppins. The type specimen was collected by the first author from Khao Khitchakut National Park (Chanthaburi Province). The specific epithet krathingensis refers to the Namtok Krathing fall, which is close to the type locality.

The lichen has a pale greenish grey thallus with a rough to verruculose (warted) texture. Ocellularia krathingensis has been recorded from Eastern and southeastern Thailand at elevation ranges between 85 and 685 m (279 and 2,247 ft). It grows on trees and lianas.
