= Palo colorado =

Palo colorado is a common name for several plants and may refer to:

- Luma apiculata, native to Chile
- Ternstroemia luquillensis, native to Puerto Rico
- Xylosma schwaneckeana, native to Puerto Rico
