= Los Amigos Biological Station =

Peruvian research station

- Overview of the buildings at Los Amigos
- Interactive map of Los Amigos Biological Station
- Location: Peru
- Coordinates: 12°34′9″S 70°6′0.40″W
- Area: 1,450 km^{2} (560 sq mi)
- Established: 2000
- Governing body: Asociación para la Conservación de la Cuenca Amazónica (ACCA)

The Los Amigos Biological Station is a research station in lowland Amazonian forest at the base of Peru's southern Andes, at 270 masl in Department of Madre de Dios. The station's official name in Spanish is Centro de Investigación y Capacitación Río Los Amigos (Los Amigos Research and Training Center). It is commonly known by its Spanish acronym, CICRA.

Flowers in Los Amigos

The station sits on a high terrace at the confluence of the Madre de Dios River and Los Amigos River. CICRA's small private property is contiguous to the Los Amigos Conservation Concession (LACC), which protects a diversity of upland and lowland forest types and aquatic habitats in 1,450 km² of the lower Los Amigos watershed. Population density in a 5 km radius of the station is approximately 2 persons per square kilometer, mostly itinerant gold miners working concessions along the Madre de Dios River; the 30-person village of Boca Amigos is 2 km from the station. Within the LACC, population density is zero, with the exception of occasional visits by uncontacted indigenous groups.

Research and training facilities at CICRA include lodging for 50 visitors, 250 m² of laboratory space, a lecture hall, a >50-km trail system, a 60-m radio tower, satellite internet access, access to online scientific literature and databases, high-resolution digital aerial photos of >200,000 ha of surrounding forests, a digital flora of >2,500 plant species collected on-site, a 470-volume scientific library, a weather station dating to 2000, and field guides to fish, amphibians and reptiles, and plants. Off-site resources include two smaller satellite stations, each with their own laboratories and lodging, 3 and 25 km from the main station; a GIS laboratory in nearby Puerto Maldonado; and two additional 60-m radio towers inside the conservation concession.

Insects in Los Amigos

The station was established in 2000 by two non-governmental organizations: the Peruvian NGO Asociación para la Conservación de la Cuenca Amazónica (ACCA) and the US-based Amazon Conservation Association (ACA). The station is administered by ACCA, in partnership with ACA and a third NGO, the Amazon Center for Environmental Education and Research (ACEER). The long-term vision of these groups is to make CICRA the leading field destination for researchers and students in Amazonia.

In 2005–2009, CICRA was the most active research station in the Amazon basin, hosting an average of 24 researchers and assistants per day. During the same period, it was likely also the most intensively studied site in the Amazon, hosting 145 different research projects spanning animal behavior, biogeochemistry, botany, conservation biology, geology, hydrology, zoology, as well as biological inventories of 31 different taxa, ranging from copepods to marsupials. These numbers place CICRA behind Panama's Barro Colorado Island and Costa Rica's La Selva Biological Station—the leading Neotropical research stations—but ahead of other field stations in the Amazon basin. Most research visitors are associated with universities in Peru or abroad, and many receive funding to visit the station through ACA and ACCA's grant programs.

Los Amigos is also a leading training site for young Amazonian scientists and conservationists. From 2002 to 2009 the station hosted 19 field courses, ranging from introductory courses on Amazonia to specialized courses on plant identification, ornithology, and arthropod biology. More than 70% of the >300 students who participated in these courses were Latin American.

Through 2006, the station received the majority of its funding from the Gordon and Betty Moore Foundation. Additional funds have come from ACEER, the Botanical Research Institute of Texas, the National Geographic Society, the U.S. National Science Foundation, and private donors. Since mid-2005, the station has covered its operating expenses with station fees from visiting researchers and courses.

== See also ==
- Cocha Cashu Biological Station
- Wayqecha Biological Station
