= Subpsoromic acid =

Names
- IUPAC name 10-formyl-9-hydroxy-3-methoxy-7-methyl-6-oxobenzo[b][1,4]benzodioxepine-1-carboxylic acid
- Other names: SCHEMBL2111989

Identifiers
3D model (JSmol)	Interactive image
ChEBI	CHEBI:216829
ChemSpider	78435135
PubChem CID	87336880
- InChI: InChI=1S/C17H12O8/c1-7-3-11(19)10(6-18)15-13(7)17(22)24-12-5-8(23-2)4-9(16(20)21)14(12)25-15/h3-6,19H,1-2H3,(H,20,21) Key: SYHVWKKTKCTSSQ-UHFFFAOYSA-N
- SMILES: CC1=CC(=C(C2=C1C(=O)OC3=CC(=CC(=C3O2)C(=O)O)OC)C=O)O

Properties
Chemical formula	C_{17}H_{12}O_{8}
Molar mass	344.275 g·mol^{−1}
- Except where otherwise noted, data are given for materials in their standard state (at 25 °C [77 °F], 100 kPa). Infobox references

Subpsoromic acid is a depsidone with the molecular formula C_{17}H_{12}O_{8} that was originally isolated from the lichen species Ocellularia praestans. It belongs to a small subclass of depsidones that combine a β-orcinol A-ring with an orcinol B-ring; few other natural products share that architectural motif.

== Natural occurrence and isolation ==
The compound was discovered during a thin-layer chromatographic survey of O. praestans thalli collected on tree bark in Brazil's coastal Restinga forest . Soxhlet extraction of 0.39 g of dried material with anhydrous diethyl ether, followed by preparative-layer chromatography, yielded 2.4 mg of pure subpsoromic acid—about 0.6 % of the dry thallus mass. The product formed colourless crystals that decomposed above 350 °C, and its homogeneity was confirmed by high-performance liquid chromatography and proton nuclear magnetic resonance. The compound has since been reported as a minor metabolite in Herpothallon rubroechinatum and in Acanthothecis verrucosa.

== Structure and chemical properties ==
High-resolution mass spectrometry established the molecular formula and showed that subpsoromic acid contains one fewer methylene unit than the better-known psoromic acid. One- and two-dimensional NMR spectra revealed a single carbon-bound methyl group (δ 2.54 ppm), one methoxy group (δ 3.83 ppm), two meta-coupled aromatic protons, an aldehydic proton (δ 10.56 ppm), and a strongly chelated phenolic hydroxyl (δ 12.36 ppm). These data, together with diagnostic mass spectral fragments at m/z 179 and 177 arising from the A-ring, support the structure 4-formyl-3-hydroxy-8-methoxy-1-methyl-11-oxo-11H-dibenzo[b,e][1,4]dioxepin-6-carboxylic acid. The compound's thin-layer chromatography Rf values (0.34–0.38 in standard solvent systems) and HPLC retention index (RI 14; RT ≈ 21.6 min) further permit routine analytical identification.
