= Gothamie Weerakoon =

Sri Lankan scientist

- Born: 1973 February 05; Sri Lanka
- Education: Bsc Biology; MSc Environmental Science; PhD Lichenology
- Alma mater: Devi Balika Vidyalaya; University of Colombo; Sri Jayawardenepura University
- Occupations: Botanist, Environmentalist, Lichenologist
- Organization: The Natural History Museum
- Known for: Research on Lichenology
- Awards: Annual Grantee Award from National Geographic Society

Gothamie Weerakoon (Sinhala: ගෝතමී වීරකෝන්) is a Sri Lankan botanist, lichenologist and environmentalist.

== Early life and education ==
Weerakoon's passion for the environment was initiated during her childhood, which she spent largely outdoors, inspired by her cousin and the natural surroundings of Diyatalawa, where she lived due to her father's military occupation. Her early education further cemented her connection to the environment, providing her with foundational knowledge about local flora and the changing seasons. This early exposure to nature deeply influenced her future academic and career choices. After completing her primary education at the Devi Balika Vidyalaya in Colombo, she attended the University of Sri Jayewardenepura, completing her PhD in 2013. Her PhD research, conducted primarily in the Knuckles Mountain Range, involved studying the activity of lichens across different habitats and establishing a comprehensive lichen checklist for the area. She emerged as the most active Sri Lankan lichen researcher.

== Career ==
She has conducted research on South Asian lichens, discovering over 100 new species endemic to Sri Lanka. Some of the species she has discovered include Heterodermia queesnberryi and Polymeridium fernandoi. In 2015, she wrote Fascinating Lichens of Sri Lanka, which provides facts about lichen species endemic to Sri Lanka. She currently works as the senior curator of Lichens and Slime Moulds at the Natural History Museum of London and also with tea brand, Dilmah. In her role as senior curator, Weerakoon oversees one of the world's largest lichen collections, consisting of over 500,000 specimens. Her responsibilities include administrative duties related to the collection, conducting research, and collaborating with global researchers.

== Awards and recognition ==
She is the first South Asian woman scientist to hold the Annual Grantee award from the National Geographic Society.

== See also ==
- Category:Taxa named by Gothamie Weerakoon

Presidential Award for Scientific publications 2015
