= Natsurang Homchantara =

Thai lichenologist (1957–2006)

Natsurang Homchantara (27 May 1957 – 11 August 2006) was a Thai lichenologist. In her relatively short career, she specialised in the taxonomy of the family Thelotremataceae, in which she helped describe many new species.

== Life and career ==
Born in Bangkok on 27 May 1957 to parents Sueb and Lamyai, Natsurang Homchantara was the fourth of five children. In 1979 she earned a B.Sc. in botany at Kasetsart University, and then went on to work at Chulalongkorn University, in the Department of Pharmacognosy in the Faculty of Pharmaceutical Science. Here she developed her knowledge of natural products, and herbal medicine from local plants. After entering the graduate program at this institution, she earned an M.Sc. in Pharmacy (Pharmacognosy) in 1985. Starting in 1991, she began working at Bangkok's Ramkhamhaeng University as an instructor in the biology department.

In 1997, Natsurang became the principal researcher in taxonomy in a lichen research unit newly established at Ramkhamhaeng University. She was then awarded a scholarship from the Thai government to work toward a PhD. She enrolled in Liverpool John Moores University as a PhD student, with Anthony Whalley and Brian John Coppins as supervisors; after working with Coppins at the Royal Botanic Garden in Edinburgh, she earned her PhD in 1999. Her thesis was titled "The taxonomic and ecological aspects of the Thelotremataceae in southeast Asia". As part of her thesis work, she and Coppins formally described 30 new lichen species from the family Thelotremataceae.

Natsurang started to suffer from health problems in 2004. She died of cancer on 11 August 2006 at age forty nine. Two Thai lichens have been named in her honour: Cladonia homchantarae Ahti & Parnmen (2008) and Chroodiscus homchantarae Papong & Lücking (2009). A workshop on the thelotremoid Graphidaceae, held at Ramkhamhaeng University in 2008, was dedicated to her honour.

== Selected publications ==
- Boonpragob, K.; Homchantara, N.; Coppins, B.J.; McCarthy, P.M.; Wolseley, P.A. (1998). "An introduction to the lichen flora of Khao Yai National Park, Thailand". Botanical Journal of Scotland. 50 (2): 209–219. doi:10.1080/03746609808684918.
- Homchantara, N.; Coppins, B.J. (2002). "New species of the lichen family Theotremataceae in SE Asia". The Lichenologist. 34 (2): 113–140. doi:10.1006/lich.2002.0382. S2CID 85429979.

== See also ==
- Category:Taxa named by Natsurang Homchantara
