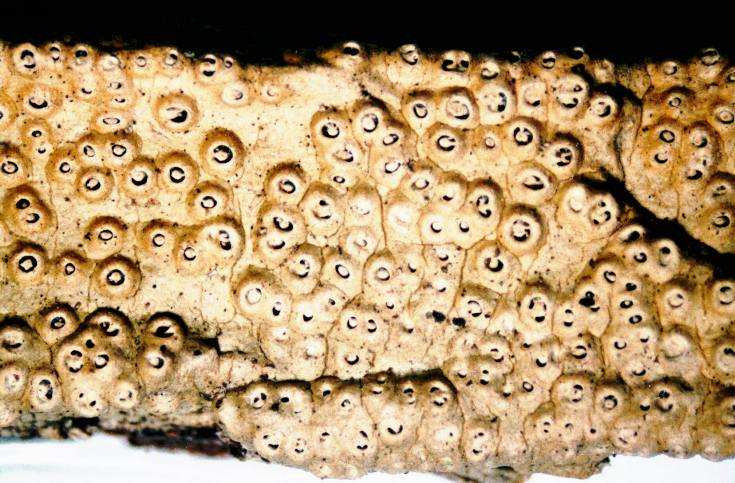
- Ocellularia granulosa

Scientific classification
- Domain: Eukaryota
- Kingdom: Fungi
- Division: Ascomycota
- Class: Lecanoromycetes
- Order: Graphidales
- Family: Graphidaceae
- Genus: Ocellularia; G.Mey. (1825)

Type species
- Ocellularia obturata (Ach.) Spreng. (1927)

Species
- 343 species

Synonyms
- Antrocarpon A.Massal. (1856); Ascidium Fée (1825); Coniochila A.Massal. (1860); Ectolechia A.Massal. (1853); Macropyrenium Hampe ex A.Massal. (1860); Ocellis Clem. (1909); Platygrapha Berk. & Broome (1873); Porophora G.Mey. (1825); Stigmagora Trevis. (1853)

= Ocellularia =

Genus of lichens

Ocellularia is a genus of lichens in the family Graphidaceae. The genus was circumscribed by Georg Friedrich Wilhelm Meyer in 1825.

== Species ==
- Ocellularia africana
- Ocellularia allosporoides
- Ocellularia andamanica
- Ocellularia antillensis
- Ocellularia aptrootiana
- Ocellularia arecae
- Ocellularia asiatica
- Ocellularia auberianoides
- Ocellularia auratipruinosa
- Ocellularia aurulenta
- Ocellularia bahiana
- Ocellularia baileyi
- Ocellularia balangoda
- Ocellularia bicuspidata
- Ocellularia bipindensis
- Ocellularia bonplandiae
- Ocellularia brunneospora
- Ocellularia bullata
- Ocellularia cameroonensis
- Ocellularia cavata
- Ocellularia chiriquiensis
- Ocellularia clandestina
- Ocellularia cloonanii
- Ocellularia concolor
- Ocellularia confluens
- Ocellularia conglomerata
- Ocellularia crocea
- Ocellularia cruentata
- Ocellularia decolorata
- Ocellularia diacida
- Ocellularia diospyri
- Ocellularia discoidea
- Ocellularia domingensis
- Ocellularia ecolumellata
- Ocellularia ecorticata
- Ocellularia eumorpha
- Ocellularia eumorphoides
- Ocellularia exanthismocarpa
- Ocellularia exuta
- Ocellularia fecunda
- Ocellularia flavescens
- Ocellularia flavisorediata
- Ocellularia fumosa
- Ocellularia gibberulosa
- Ocellularia henatomma
- Ocellularia interposita
- Ocellularia inthanonensis
- Ocellularia inturgescens
- Ocellularia jacinda-arderniae – New Zealand
- Ocellularia kalbii
- Ocellularia khuntanensis
- Ocellularia krathingensis
- Ocellularia kurandensis
- Ocellularia landronii
- Ocellularia leioplacoides
- Ocellularia lumbschii – Vietnam
- Ocellularia massalongoi
- Ocellularia mauritiana
- Ocellularia melanophthalma
- Ocellularia melanotremata
- Ocellularia microstoma
- Ocellularia minutula
- Ocellularia mordenii
- Ocellularia mozambica
- Ocellularia neoleucina
- Ocellularia neoperforata
- Ocellularia neopertusariiformis
- Ocellularia orthomastia
- Ocellularia papillata
- Ocellularia perforata
- Ocellularia phaeotropa
- Ocellularia pluriporoides
- Ocellularia polydisca
- Ocellularia postposita
- Ocellularia profunda
- Ocellularia pyrenuloides
- Ocellularia raveniana
- Ocellularia reticulata
- Ocellularia rhabdospora
- Ocellularia rhicnoporoides
- Ocellularia rhodostroma
- Ocellularia ripleyi
- Ocellularia roseotecta
- Ocellularia saxicola – Vietnam
- Ocellularia subgranulosa
- Ocellularia subleucina
- Ocellularia subsimilis
- Ocellularia tenuis
- Ocellularia thelotremoides
- Ocellularia turbinata
- Ocellularia verrucosa
- Ocellularia vezdana
- Ocellularia viridis
- Ocellularia wirthii
- Ocellularia wolseleyana
- Ocellularia xanthostroma
- Ocellularia zenkeri
