= Cyclographina =

Scientific classification
- Kingdom: Fungi
- Division: Ascomycota
- Class: Lecanoromycetes
- Order: Graphidales
- Family: Graphidaceae
- Genus: Cyclographina; D.D.Awasthi (1979)

Type species
- Cyclographina pruinosa (Eschw.) D.D.Awasthi (1979)

Genus of lichens

Cyclographina is a genus of lichen-forming fungi in the family Graphidaceae. It has eight species.

== Taxonomy ==
The genus was circumscribed in 1979 by Indian lichenologist Dharani Dhar Awasthi, with Cyclographina pruinosa assigned as the type species. While conducting research on the genus Helminthocarpon (in the order Arthoniales), Awasthi and Santosh Joshi and his colleagues observed that several species did not exhibit the typical branched, interwoven paraphyses that are characteristic of this genus. Instead, these species were found to have paraphyses of this type limited to the upper portion of the hymenium, resembling a morphological feature seen in the genus Catarraphia. This specific feature was initially documented in the lichen Helminthocarpon pruinosa by Zahlbruckner. As a result of these findings, the Helminthocarpon species that possessed muriform ascospores were reclassified into the newly established genus Cyclographina.

Bettina Staiger and colleagues later noted that Cyclographina as originally circumscribed comprised only a few species, all transferred from Helminthocarpon. They also argued that the circumscription did not account for additional Graphina species with similar ("Cyclographina-like") features, and that older, potentially synonymous generic names (such as Solenographa) had not been evaluated.

== Species ==
- Cyclographina circumscissa (Vain.) Makhija & Patw. (1995)
- Cyclographina citri Vain. ex D.D.Awasthi & M.Joshi (1979)
- Cyclographina cubana D.D.Awasthi & M.Joshi (1979)
- Cyclographina hologlauca (Nyl.) Kalb (1984)
- Cyclographina holstii (Müll.Arg.) D.D.Awasthi & M.Joshi (1979)
- Cyclographina icmadophiloides (Stein) D.D.Awasthi & M.Joshi (1979)
- Cyclographina lojkana (Müll.Arg.) D.D.Awasthi & M.Joshi (1979)
- Cyclographina pervarians (Nyl.) D.D.Awasthi & M.Joshi (1979)
