= Malmographina =

Scientific classification
- Kingdom: Fungi
- Division: Ascomycota
- Class: Lecanoromycetes
- Order: Graphidales
- Family: Graphidaceae
- Genus: Malmographina; M.Cáceres, Rivas Plata & Lücking (2011)
- Species: M. plicosa

Binomial name
- Malmographina plicosa (C.F.W.Meissn.) M.Cáceres, Rivas Plata & Lücking (2011)

Synonyms
- Opegrapha plicosa C.F.W.Meissn. (1855); Hemithecium plicosum (C.F.W.Meissn.) Lücking & Aptroot (2008)

Single-species lichen genus

Malmographina is a fungal genus in the family Graphidaceae. The genus is monotypic, containing the single species Malmographina plicosa, a script lichen found in South America. Genus Malmographina is characterised by its smooth, olive-green thallus, erumpent to prominent lirellae (fruiting bodies) with orange to cinnabar-red pigment, a clear hymenium, and hyaline, non-amyloid ascospores.

== Taxonomy ==
The genus Malmographina, with its single species Malmographina plicosa, was circumscribed to address phylogenetic discrepancies in the family Graphidaceae. Historically, genera within Graphidaceae with lirellate ascomata were classified based on spore pigmentation and septation (internal partitioning), as well as the organisation of the ascomata. This resulted in the recognition of eight genera, including Graphis, Phaeographis, Graphina, Phaeographina, Glyphis, Medusulina, Sarcographa, and Sarcographina. However, this classification was highly artificial and was challenged by Bettina Staiger in 2002, who proposed new genus circumscriptions based on a combination of morphological, anatomical, and chemical features, expanding the classification to 22 genera.

Molecular studies conducted by various researchers in the years following were used to further refine the genus circumscriptions. These studies confirmed some of Staiger's taxa but also revealed that certain genera, like Graphis and Hemithecium, were polyphyletic and contained multiple unrelated lineages.

Hemithecium plicosum, a species with uncertain phylogenetic affinities, did not cluster with either Graphis or Hemithecium in phylogenetic analyses. Instead, it fell within the clade containing Phaeographis and other grey-brown-spored genera, despite having persistently hyaline ascospores. This justified the creation of the new genus Malmographina to accommodate this taxon.

The genus Malmographina is characterised by its smooth, olive-green thallus, erumpent to prominent lirellae (fruiting bodies) with orange to cinnabar-red pigment, a clear hymenium, and hyaline, non-amyloid ascospores. It differs from other genera in Graphidaceae by the combination of Hemithecium-like lirellae and the presence of anthraquinone pigments in the lirellae. The type species, Malmographina plicosa, shows unique features that support its placement in a separate genus, including the absence of lichen substances in the thallus, the presence of anthraquinones in the lirellae, and the distinctive morphology of its ascomata and ascospores.

== Description ==
Malmographina plicosa is characterised by its smooth, olive-green thallus, which can turn yellowish when preserved in a herbarium. The thallus has a dense outer layer and an irregular photobiont layer interspersed with clusters of calcium oxalate crystals.

The apothecia, known as lirellae, are erumpent to prominent and have a finely but distinctly striated surface, with an orange to cinnabar-red pigment. The disc of the apothecia is hidden, and the excipulum (the outer rim of the apothecium) is distinctly scalloped and ranges in colour from orange-brown to dark brown or carbonised in the inner parts. Over time, the old, compressed layers of hymenia between the excipular striations also turn dark brown to nearly carbonised. The hymenium (spore-producing layer) is clear, while the epithecium, the uppermost layer of the hymenium, contains clusters of dark brown to blackish granules. The ascospores are muriform (divided into multiple chambers), hyaline (translucent), and do not stain with iodine.

No lichen substances have been detected in the thallus of Malmographina plicosa, but the lirellae contain anthraquinones, specifically tetrahydroxyanthraquinone (1,3,6,8) and other pigments.

== Habitat and distribution ==
Malmographina plicosa is primarily found in the Amazon basin. Its known range includes Suriname, where the type specimen of Opegrapha plicosa was collected, and various locations in the Peruvian Amazonia, particularly in the Department of Madre de Dios. Additionally, it has been recorded in Amazonian Brazil, with several collections from Rondônia, and in the adjacent state of Mato Grosso, where the type of Graphina malmei was found.

This lichen species grows in partially exposed to sully sun-exposed microsites, predominantly on the bark of large trees. In these habitats, it is commonly associated with other lichens that share similar ecological preferences, such as species of Glyphis, Phaeographis, and other members of the Graphidaceae.
