= Melanotopelia =

Scientific classification
- Domain: Eukaryota
- Kingdom: Fungi
- Division: Ascomycota
- Class: Lecanoromycetes
- Order: Graphidales
- Family: Graphidaceae
- Genus: Melanotopelia; Lumbsch & Mangold (2008)

Type species
- Melanotopelia toensbergii (Kantvilas & Vězda) Lumbsch & Mangold (2008)

Species
- M. africana M. blepharostoma M. rugosa M. toensbergii

Genus of lichens

Melanotopelia is a genus of lichen-forming fungi in the family Graphidaceae. It has four species of corticolous (bark-dwelling), crustose lichens. This genus includes species characterised by dark pigmentation in their exciple (a ring of tissue encircling their fruiting bodies), non-amyloid ascospores, and specific secondary metabolites.

== Taxonomy ==
The genus was circumscribed in 2008 by the lichenologists H. Thorsten Lumbsch and Armin Mangold, with M. toensbergii assigned as the type species. The name Melanotopelia comes from the Greek prefix melano- (meaning very dark), which refers to the dark pigmentation of the true exciple, and the genus Topelia (family Gyalectaceae), which it superficially resembles. The type was originally described as a member of the genus Topeliopsis toensbergii in 2000.

Melanotopelia was established to address certain morphological and chemical characteristics that distinguished it from other genera within its family. Previous studies on the genus Topeliopsis had revealed notable inconsistencies in its circumscription. Initially described to accommodate species with specific ascomata features and spore characteristics, Topeliopsis was found to be heterogeneous. Some species, such as T. rugosa and T. toensbergii, showed unique traits that set them apart, such as dark pigmented layers in the proper exciple, non-amyloid ascospores, and the presence of depsidones.

Subsequent molecular phylogenetics analyses supported the exclusion of these deviating species from Topeliopsis. The detailed morphological and chemical differences, along with DNA sequence data, demonstrated the need for a distinct genus to house these outliers. Consequently, the new genus Melanotopelia was described.

== Description ==
Melanotopelia is a genus of crustose lichens characterised by a thin, sometimes barely noticeable thallus covered by a delicate epinecral layer. The thallus lacks a visible prothallus and contains a trentepohlioid photobiont, which is a type of green alga.

The apothecia (fruiting bodies) are sessile (attached directly by their base without a stalk) and can be subglobose (almost spherical) or barrel-shaped. Initially, they are closed but later open by a terminal pore. These apothecia measure between 0.3 and 1.0 mm in diameter and have a somewhat toothed margin. The discs are dark brown to blackish and deeply urn-shaped. The true exciple (outer layer of the apothecium) is cup-shaped, dark brown to black-brown, and features an internal, hyaline (translucent), amyloid layer at the top with lateral paraphyses (sterile filamentous structures).

The hypothecium, which is the tissue layer below the hymenium (spore-bearing layer), is hyaline. The hymenium itself is tall, ranging from 150 to 350 μm, hyaline, and non-amyloid. Paraphyses are simple, straight, and fused together without thickened tips. The asci (spore sacs) are cylindrical, non-amyloid, and of the Ostropales type, typically containing 1 to 4 spores.

The ascospores are ellipsoid, hyaline, and have a true muriform (brick-like) structure. They measure 75 to 180 μm in length and 20 to 40 μm in width. These spores are thin-walled, sometimes indistinctly surrounded by a halo (halonate), and turn reddish when treated with iodine. Pycnidia, which are asexual reproductive structures, are unknown for this genus. In terms of chemistry, Melanotopelia species produce depsidones, particularly the stictic acid chemosyndrome or protocetraric acid.

== Species ==
- Melanotopelia africana Sérus., M.Brand, Ertz, Eb.Fisch., Killmann & van den Boom (2009)
- Melanotopelia blepharostoma Lumbsch & Divakar (2010)
- Melanotopelia rugosa (Kantvilas & Vězda) Lumbsch & Mangold (2008)
- Melanotopelia toensbergii (Kantvilas & Vězda) Lumbsch & Mangold (2008)
