= Pseudotopeliopsis =

Scientific classification
- Kingdom: Fungi
- Division: Ascomycota
- Class: Lecanoromycetes
- Order: Graphidales
- Family: Graphidaceae
- Genus: Pseudotopeliopsis; Parnmen, Lücking & Lumbsch (2012)

Type species
- Pseudotopeliopsis laceratula (Müll.Arg.) Parnmen, Lücking & Lumbsch (2012)

Species
- P. laceratula P. longispora

Genus of lichens

Pseudotopeliopsis is a genus of lichen-forming fungi in the family Graphidaceae. It has two species.

== Taxonomy ==
The genus was circumscribed in 2012 by the lichenologists Sittiporn Parnmen, Robert Lücking, and H. Thorsten Lumbsch. They assigned Pseudotopeliopsis laceratula as the type species; this lichen was originally named as a member of genus Thelotrema by Johannes Müller Argoviensis in 1887. The genus name is derived from the Greek word pseudo, meaning "false", combined with the name Topeliopsis, alluding to its resemblance to that genus.

== Description ==
The thallus of Pseudotopeliopsis typically has dense outer layer, or cortex. The apothecia (fruiting bodies) emerge from the thallus and are rounded to irregularly shaped. These apothecia feature a disc that resembles a small pore and is covered by concentrically layered, fissured, and lobulated margins. The surrounding tissue of the apothecia, known as the excipulum, varies from colourless to brown.

The spores of Pseudotopeliopsis are elongated, ranging from fusiform-ellipsoid to oblong-cylindrical in shape, and are divided by cross walls (septa) that may be slightly thickened and form angular spaces within the spore. These spores are initially colourless and can turn brown as they age. They do not react to staining with iodine solution.

Chemically, this genus does not produce any notable secondary metabolites (lichen products) that are detectable with standard chemical spot tests. Pseudotopeliopsis is distinct from the closely related genus Chapsa primarily due to its denser cortex and the unique structure of its apothecia, which resemble those of the genus Topeliopsis with their striated tissue filling the disc–a distinctive structural feature that sets it apart from similar genera.

== Species ==
- Pseudotopeliopsis laceratula (Müll.Arg.) Parnmen, Lücking & Lumbsch (2012)
- Pseudotopeliopsis longispora Papong, Lücking & Parnmen (2015)

Although the genus was originally circumscribed with four species, three of those have since been transferred to other genera:

- Pseudotopeliopsis aggregata (Hale) Parnmen, Lücking & Lumbsch (2012) is now Nitidochapsa aggregata
- Pseudotopeliopsis scabiocarpa (Rivas Plata & Lücking) Parnmen, Lücking & Lumbsch (2012) is now Chapsa scabiocarpa
- Pseudotopeliopsis scabiomarginata (Hale) Parnmen, Lücking & Lumbsch (2012) is now Chapsa scabiomarginata.
