= Cryptoschizotrema =

Scientific classification
- Domain: Eukaryota
- Kingdom: Fungi
- Division: Ascomycota
- Class: Lecanoromycetes
- Order: Graphidales
- Family: Graphidaceae
- Genus: Cryptoschizotrema; Aptroot, Lücking & M.Cáceres (2019)

Type species
- Cryptoschizotrema cryptotrema (Nyl.) Aptroot, Lücking & M.Cáceres (2019)

Species
- C. cryptotrema C. minus

Genus of lichen-forming fungi

Cryptoschizotrema is a genus of lichen-forming fungi in the family Graphidaceae. It has two species. The genus was circumscribed in 2019 by lichenologists André Aptroot, Robert Lücking, and Marcela Cáceres. The genus name alludes to the similarity in anatomy with Schizotrema species. This resemblance is due to the partially carbonized, concentrically layered, and fissured excipulum, which gives the impression that the Schizotrema-like excipulum is concealed beneath a protective layer. The type species was originally described by William Nylander in 1867, as a species of Thelotrema.

== Description ==
The ascomata of Cryptoschizotrema lichens are immersed-erumpent and rounded, with the disc concealed beneath a narrow pore. The proper margin is hidden by a whitish thalline layer, and when abraded, it reveals brown to black fissured lobules that form concentric layers in older specimens. Notably, a columella is absent in this genus. The excipulum of Cryptoschizotrema is prosoplectenchymatous, displaying a dark brown colour that may partially carbonize towards its apex. As the ascomata mature, the excipulum develops distinct layers or striations. Periphysoids, however, are not present.

The hymenium of this lichen is transparent, featuring unbranched paraphyses. Ascospores are typically found in quantities of one to two, though occasionally up to four per ascus. These ascospores are muriform, measuring up to 100 by 30 μm, and have an oblong to ellipsoid shape. The distoseptae, with relatively thin walls and septa, along with angular lumina, contribute to the ascospores' colourless appearance. Additionally, they are I-negative, indicating their non-amyloid nature. The secondary chemistry of the genus is characterized by the presence of psoromic acid, which causes the thallus to display a P+ (yellow) reaction with standard chemical spot tests.

== Species ==
Species in this genus occur in Central and South America.

- Cryptoschizotrema cryptotrema (Nyl.) Aptroot, Lücking & M.Cáceres 2019)
- Cryptoschizotrema minus E.L.Lima & Lücking (2019)
