= Tremotylium =

Scientific classification
- Domain: Eukaryota
- Kingdom: Fungi
- Division: Ascomycota
- Class: Lecanoromycetes
- Order: Graphidales
- Family: Graphidaceae
- Genus: Tremotylium; Nyl. (1865)

Type species
- Tremotylium angolense Nyl. (1868)

Species
- T. africanum T. angolense T. australiense T. sprucei

Synonyms
- Phanotylium Clem. (1909)

Genus of lichens

Tremotylium is a genus of lichen-forming fungi in the family Graphidaceae. The genus was circumscribed by Finnish lichenologist William Nylander in 1865, but it was not published validly. He validated the genus and assigned T. angolense as the type species in 1868.

== Species ==
- Tremotylium africanum Räsänen (1949)
- Tremotylium angolense Nyl. (1868)
- Tremotylium australiense Müll.Arg. (1882)
- Tremotylium sprucei Müll.Arg. (1895)
