= Amazonotrema =

Scientific classification
- Kingdom: Fungi
- Division: Ascomycota
- Class: Lecanoromycetes
- Order: Graphidales
- Family: Graphidaceae
- Genus: Amazonotrema; Kalb & Lücking (2009)
- Species: A. nigrum

Binomial name
- Amazonotrema nigrum Kalb & Lücking (2009)

Single-species fungal genus

Amazonotrema is a monotypic genus of lichenised fungi in the family Graphidaceae. It was circumscribed in 2009 by Klaus Kalb and Robert Lücking for the species Amazonotrema nigrum. The type specimen of A. nigrum was collected from virgin rainforest along the Rio Negro in the Brazilian state of Amazonas.

== Taxonomy ==
The genus name is a combination of Amazon, for the Amazon basin region from which the type specimen was collected, and trema, for the systematic position of the genus within the family Graphidaceae; it falls into the "thelotremoid" group because of the structure of its fruiting bodies (apothecia). As of 2020, it had not been genetically sequenced, so its relationship to other genera in the family is uncertain.

== Description ==
Amazonotrema nigrum is a crustose lichen with a smooth, grey, and somewhat glossy surface, and it grows on tree bark, stripped wood and tree fern stems. Unlike most plant-dwelling lichens (but like many other tropical, crustose lichens), it lives partially immersed in the bark or stems on which it grows – a strategy known as endophloeodal. Its apothecia, which tend to be dispersed across the lichen's surface, are steep-sided, broadly rounded at the apex, and the same colour as the thallus. The apothecia's central disc is typically black, which is what led to the scientific name nigrum. It is not known to have either isidia or soralia (two lichen structures which allow vegetative reproduction).

Each ascus within the apothecia contains 5–8 ascospores, which are chestnut-brown in colour and arranged in rows. The spores themselves are muriform – divided into smaller compartments by intersecting partitions known as septa.

The lichen produces several secondary metabolites, including stictic acid and constictic acid.

== See also ==
- List of lichens of Brazil
