= Corticorygma =

Scientific classification
- Kingdom: Fungi
- Division: Ascomycota
- Class: Lecanoromycetes
- Order: Graphidales
- Family: Graphidaceae
- Genus: Corticorygma; M.Cáceres, S.C.Feuerst., Aptroot & Lücking (2014)
- Species: C. stellatum

Binomial name
- Corticorygma stellatum M.Cáceres, S.C.Feuerst., Aptroot & Lücking (2014)
- Holotype: Fazenda São Francisco, Brazil

Genus of lichens

Corticorygma is a monotypic fungal genus in the subfamily Graphidoideae of the family Graphidaceae. It contains a single species, the corticolous (bark-dwelling) crustose lichen Corticorygma stellatum. This script lichen is found in the shaded understory of rainforests in the Brazilian states of Rondônia and Paraná.

== Taxonomy ==
Both the genus and the species were described as new to science in 2014 by the lichenologists Marcela Cáceres, Shirley Cunha Feuerstein, André Aptroot, and Robert Lücking. The type specimen of Corticorygma stellatum was collected from Fazenda São Francisco, located off the BR-319 highway, 30 km (19 mi) north of Porto Velho (Rondônia, Brazil), at an elevation of 100 m (330 ft). Cáceres and Aptroot found the lichen growing on tree bark in a primary rainforest on 15 March 2012.

Molecular phylogenetics analysis shows that Corticorygma forms part of the Acanthothecis clade, which also includes Acanthothecis, Gintarasia, and Topeliopsis darlingtonii. This group of taxa (excluding Topeliopsis darlingtonii, subsequently synonymized with Gintarasia) was formally described as tribe Acanthothecieae, member of the Graphidaceae subfamily Graphidoideae.

== Description ==
The thallus (lichen body) of Corticorygma stellatum is corticolous, meaning it grows on tree bark. It can reach up to 10 cm (3.9 in) in diameter and has a continuous, smooth, light grey surface without a visible prothallus (the initial growth stage of the lichen). In cross-section, the thallus is 30–50 μm thick and comprises a prosoplectenchymatous cortex (5–10 μm thick), a photobiont layer (10–15 μm thick), and a medulla (20–30 μm thick) encrusted with numerous small, grey crystals that are insoluble in potassium hydroxide (K) solution. The photobiont partner is Trentepohlia, a type of green algae with cells that are rounded to irregular, arranged in groups, and measuring 6–11 by 5–8 μm.

The ascomata (fruiting bodies) are lirellate (elongated and furrowed), forming distinct, well-defined stellate clusters that are erumpent (bursting through the surface). These clusters are 1–3 mm in diameter, with individual lirellae measuring 1–3 mm long, 0.2–0.3 mm wide, and 0.12–0.15 mm high. The disc of the ascomata is narrow and light brown, covered with a thick white pruina (powdery coating). The proper margin is thin, dark brown, and also pruinose, while the thalline margin is thick and pruinose.

The excipulum (outer layer of the fruiting body) is dark brown, 15–20 μm wide, and prosoplectenchymatous. The thalline margin is 30–50 μm thick and similar in structure to the thallus. The hypothecium (layer below the hymenium) is hyaline and prosoplectenchymatous, measuring 5–10 μm high. The hymenium (fertile layer) is 100–120 μm high, hyaline, and clear, topped by a granular epithecium that is 15–20 μm high and dark grey-brown. The paraphyses (sterile filaments among the asci) are unbranched and smooth. No periphysoids (specialized paraphyses) are observed. The asci (spore-bearing structures) are cylindrical to narrowly clavate, measuring 100–120 by 25–30 μm. Each ascus contains a single ascospore, which is ellipsoid to oblong, richly muriform (with many internal septa), measuring 60–110 by 20–30 μm, and is 3–4 times as long as wide. The ascospores are hyaline, subdistoseptate (with partially developed septa), and have angular lumina. They do not react to staining with iodine (I–).

The secondary chemistry of Corticorygma stellatum includes a complex of stictic acids, specifically stictic and hypostictic acids, along with two unknown compounds related to norstictic and connorstictic acids. The medulla reacts to chemical spot tests with a P+ (orange) reaction, and microscopic sections show a K+ (persistently yellow) efflux.

== Habitat and distribution ==
Corticorygma stellatum is exclusively found in primary rainforests within the states of Rondônia and Paraná in Brazil. This lichen species lives in the shaded understory of undisturbed rainforest environments.
