= Enigmotrema =

Scientific classification
- Domain: Eukaryota
- Kingdom: Fungi
- Division: Ascomycota
- Class: Lecanoromycetes
- Order: Graphidales
- Family: Graphidaceae
- Genus: Enigmotrema; Lücking (2012)
- Species: E. rubrum

Binomial name
- Enigmotrema rubrum Lücking (2012)

Single-species lichen genus

Enigmotrema is a fungal genus in the family Graphidaceae. It contains only one known species, Enigmotrema rubrum, a lichen which was discovered in Costa Rica. Both the genus and species were first described in 2012 by the lichenologist Robert Lücking. The genus name combines the Greek words for "mystery" and "hole", referring to the unusual appearance of its reproductive structures. Enigmotrema is characterised by its olive-coloured body (thallus) and distinctive dark red fruiting bodies (apothecia) that undergo a unique opening process as they mature. The genus is closely related to Cruentotrema but differs in its genetic makeup and the development of its fruiting bodies. Currently, Enigmotrema is only known from a single location in a montane rainforest in Costa Rica, where it was found growing on tree bark.

== Taxonomy ==
The genus Enigmotrema was circumscribed by the lichenologist Robert Lücking in 2012. The name Enigmotrema combines the Greek words enigma (meaning mystery or puzzle) and τρημα trema (meaning hole or pore), referring to the unusual appearance of its fruiting bodies.

Enigmotrema is closely related to the genus Cruentotrema but differs in several key aspects. Genetic analysis of the mitochondrial small subunit ribosomal DNA (mtSSU) revealed unique characteristics that place Enigmotrema outside the Cruentotrema-Dyplolabia clade, a group of closely related lichen genera. Later molecular analysis suggests that the species is nested with Fissurina, and that it is closely related to the Fissurina pseudostromatica clade.

== Description ==
Enigmotrema lichens possess a distinctive appearance that sets them apart from their close relatives. The thallus of the lichen has an olive-green to olive-yellow colouration. Its surface is smooth to slightly uneven, protected by a dense outer layer, the cortex. This cortex is composed of tightly interwoven fungal threads, or hyphae, forming a protective barrier for the lichen.

A characteristic feature of Enigmotrema is its apothecia. These fruiting bodies undergo a unique development process that gives the genus its enigmatic character. Initially, the apothecia appear as small, closed, dark red structures reminiscent of tiny flasks. As they mature, these structures, measuring between 0.7 and 1.2 millimetres in diameter, begin a transformation. First, the outer layer of the apothecium splits open, revealing a dark red inner layer. This is followed by the remaining covering splitting into triangular teeth-like structures that curl inwards. This process gradually exposes the brown-black surface, known as the disc, where spores are produced. The end result is a complex, open structure that bears little resemblance to its initial closed form.

Inside these apothecia, Enigmotrema produces colourless, ellipsoid spores called ascospores. These spores are relatively small, measuring 10–12 micrometres (μm) in length and 5–6 μm in width. They possess three cross-walls, or septa, and have a distinctive internal structure characterised by thick walls and diamond-shaped chambers (lumina. This internal arrangement is similar to that found in some other lichen genera, particularly Astrothelium.

From a chemical perspective, Enigmotrema is notable for containing a dark red pigment called isohypocrellin in the inner layer (medulla) of its apothecia. This pigment contributes to the striking red colour of the fruiting bodies. Standard analytical techniques did not detect any other significant chemical substances in the lichen's composition.

== Habitat and distribution ==
Enigmotrema rubrum, was discovered growing on tree bark in Costa Rica. The specimen was collected from the Las Cruces Biological Station at the Las Cruces Biological Station, located in the Talamanca mountain range. This area is characterised as a montane rainforest zone at an elevation of about 1,200 metres above sea level.

The lichen was found growing on the lower trunk of a tree in a semi-exposed location. While the immediate surroundings were described as "anthropogenic vegetation" (vegetation influenced by human activity), it was within the context of a protected botanical garden.
