= Crutarndina =

Scientific classification
- Kingdom: Fungi
- Division: Ascomycota
- Class: Lecanoromycetes
- Order: Graphidales
- Family: Graphidaceae
- Genus: Crutarndina; Parnmen, Lücking & Lumbsch (2012)
- Species: C. petractoides

Binomial name
- Crutarndina petractoides (P.M.Jørg. & Brodo) Parnmen, Lücking & Lumbsch (2012)

Synonyms
- Thelotrema petractoides P.M.Jørg. & Brodo (1995)

Single-species lichen genus

Crutarndina is a monotypic fungal genus in the family Graphidaceae. It contains the single species Crutarndina petractoides, a corticolous (bark-dwelling), crustose lichen.

== Taxonomy ==
The sole species of Crutarndina was first formally described in 1995 by Per Magnus Jørgensen and Irwin Brodo, who originally classified it in the genus Thelotrema. Sittiporn Parnmen, Robert Lücking, and H. Thorsten Lumbsch circumscribed the genus Crutarndina in 2012 to contain the species after molecular phylogenetics analysis showed that it represented a unique lineage.

The genus name Crutarndina honours the eminent British lichenologist Peter Crittenden from Nottingham, who assisted in collecting the type material during a field excursion organized by the British Lichen Society. The surname Crittenden originates from Old British and Welsh, translating to "the cot on the lower hill," combining "cru" (cot), "tarn" (lower), and "dun" or "din" (hill).

== Description ==
Crutarndina is distinguished from the closely related genus Thelotrema primarily by its unique apothecial structure. In Crutarndina, the fruiting bodies (apothecia) have star-like, multi-layered margins, which differ significantly from those observed in Thelotrema. The thallus, or body, of Crutarndina lichens lacks a cortex, meaning it does not have a protective outer layer. The apothecia are erumpent, meaning they break through the thallus surface as they develop, and they are generally rounded in shape. The central disc of the apothecia is largely hidden by the surrounding exciple. This exciple is strikingly star-like and has multiple layers, adding to the distinct appearance of the lichen.

The exciple varies in composition, being hyaline (transparent) at the base but becoming carbonised (turning to a black, carbon-rich compound) towards the top. The ascospores, which are the reproductive spores formed in the asci (spore-producing cells), are fusiform (spindle-shaped) and transversely septate, meaning they have multiple cross walls (septa). These walls are thickened, and the spaces between them are lens-shaped to rounded, a feature described as distoseptate. The spores are colourless and react positively to iodine staining (I+). Crutarndina does not produce secondary metabolites (lichen products).

== Habitat and distribution ==
Crutarndina petractoides is predominantly found in oceanic regions, growing on the somewhat shaded, smooth bark of trees, especially Corylus (hazel) and Sorbus (rowan). While it may occasionally colonise other broadleaved trees, it primarily grows in the sheltered woodlands and boggy areas of temperate rainforests. The species is locally abundant in Western Scotland and Western and Southwestern Ireland. It is, however, very rare in North Wales and Cumbria.
