= Jocatoa =

Scientific classification
- Domain: Eukaryota
- Kingdom: Fungi
- Division: Ascomycota
- Class: Lecanoromycetes
- Order: Graphidales
- Family: Graphidaceae
- Genus: Jocatoa; R.Miranda (2020)
- Species: J. agminalis

Binomial name
- Jocatoa agminalis (Nyl.) Lücking, Herrera-Camp. & R.Miranda (2020)

Synonyms
- Graphina agminalis (Nyl.) Zahlbr. (1923); Graphis agminalis Nyl. (1867)

Single-species lichen genus

Jocatoa is a fungal genus in the family Graphidaceae. It contains the single species Jocatoa agminalis, a corticolous (bark-dwelling), crustose lichen that can be found in dry forests and semi-arid regions throughout Colombia, Mexico, and the United States. The genus is characterized by its simple, thin paraphysis tips and the absence of an epithecium. Named in honor of the late Professor José Castillo Tovar for his contributions to Mexican mycology, Jocatoa is distinguishable from other superficially similar genera such as Diorygma and Glyphis based on its distinctive features, chemical composition, and molecular data.

== Taxonomy ==
Jocatoa was circumscribed by Mexican lichenologist Ricardo Miranda-González in 2020. The genus is classified in the family Graphidaceae, subfamily Graphidoideae, and tribe Graphideae. The genus Jocatoa belongs to the same tribe, Graphideae, as Sarcographa and Glyphis but is not closely related to them. It differs from the closely related genus Diorygma by having simple, thin paraphysis tips that do not form an epithecium. Jocatoa agminalis was originally described as a species of Graphis by William Nylander in 1867. The genus is named in honor of the late Professor José Castillo Tovar (1935–2012) for his contributions to the education of Mexican mycologists, and for introducing the genus author to lichens.

== Description ==
The genus Jocatoa is characterized by an ecorticate thallus, muriform spores that exhibit a strong violet color when treated with iodine, and a chemistry belonging to the stictic acid complex. This monospecific genus closely resembles species of Diorygma in terms of its ecorticate thallus, spore type, and chemistry. However, it differs by having simple, thin paraphysis tips that do not form an epithecium, unlike the reticulately branched, anastomosed, and thickened paraphysis tips in Diorygma that form a clear epithecium.

Jocatoa agminalis, the single species within the genus, is distinguished by its crustose, corticolous, epiperidermal, and ecorticate thallus, which is light yellowish-brown to olive-green in color. The photobiont is trentepohlioid, forming a continuous layer surrounded by small crystals. The ascocarps are abundant and can be lirelliform to rounded, erumpent, straight to curved, and unbranched when young. They can also form white to cream-colored pseudostromata in groups. The species has hyaline, strongly muriform, ellipsoid ascospores, with inner cells larger than peripheral cells, measuring 110–217 μm by 45–85 μm. Jocatoa agminalis features a chemistry with hypostictic, stictic, cryptostictic, and constictic acids, as well as three unknown substances that react with UV light.

== Habitat and distribution ==
Jocatoa agminalis is primarily found in mature tropical dry forests, such as those in the Chamela-Cuixmala Biosphere Reserve in Mexico. It has also been recorded in Colombia's Magdalena River Valley, Brownsville, Texas, Louisiana, and Tamaulipas, Mexico. The species is generally corticolous, growing on the bark of trees like Apoplanesia paniculata, Cordia alliodora, Thouinia paucidentata, and Amphipterygium adstringens.
