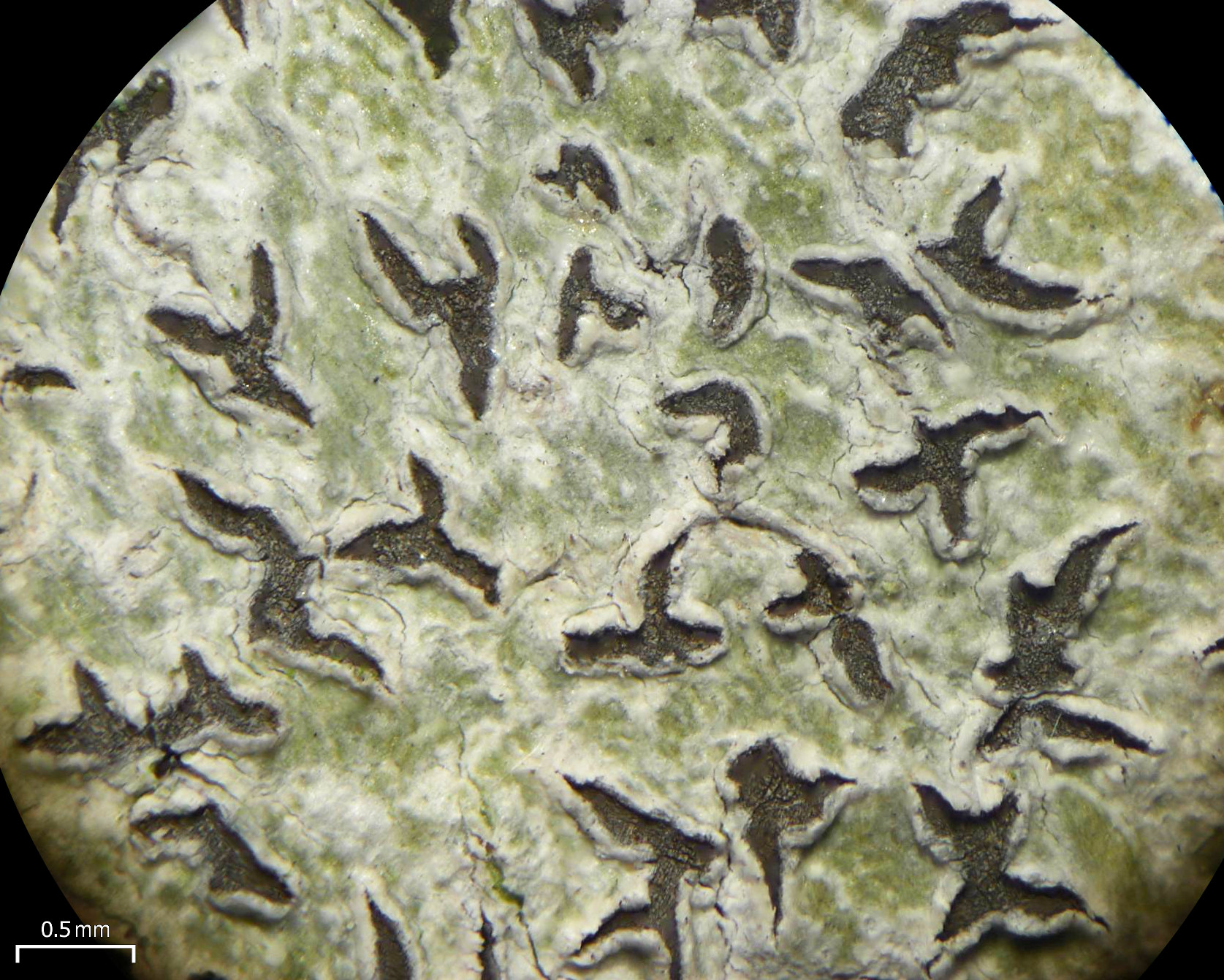
- Leiorreuma explicans

Scientific classification
- Domain: Eukaryota
- Kingdom: Fungi
- Division: Ascomycota
- Class: Lecanoromycetes
- Order: Graphidales
- Family: Graphidaceae
- Genus: Leiorreuma; Eschw. (1824)

Type species
- Leiorreuma hepaticum Eschw. (1824)

= Leiorreuma =

Genus of lichens

Leiorreuma is a genus of script lichens in the family Graphidaceae. It has 18 species. The genus was circumscribed by Franz Gerhard Eschweiler in 1824, with Leiorreuma hepaticum assigned as the type species.

== Description ==
Leiorreuma is identified by certain features. It has apothecia with noticeable sessile opened lirellae. The proper exciple is often thin on the sides but well-developed at the base and appears charred. The hymenium is dotted with small specks, and the spores are pale brown and have thin walls with crosswise septa or are divided into many compartments (muriform). They are not stained by iodine.

== Species ==
- Leiorreuma convariatum (Kremp.) A.W.Archer (2007)
- Leiorreuma crassimarginatum Z.F.Jia (2015) – China
- Leiorreuma dilatatum (Vain.) Staiger (2002)
- Leiorreuma ellipticum (Müll.Arg.) Staiger (2002)
- Leiorreuma erodens Seavey & J.Seavey (2017) – Florida
- Leiorreuma exaltatum (Mont. & Bosch) Staiger (2002)
- Leiorreuma explicans (Fink) Lendemer (2008)
- Leiorreuma hepaticum Eschw. (1824)
- Leiorreuma hypomelaenoides Poengs. & Kalb (2014) – Thailand
- Leiorreuma hypomelaenum (Müll.Arg.) Staiger (2002)
- Leiorreuma melanostalazans (Leight.) A.W.Archer (2005)
- Leiorreuma nicobarense Pushpi Singh, Jagadeesh and Kr.P.Singh (2017) – India
- Leiorreuma nornotaticum (A.W.Archer & Elix) A.W.Archer (2005)
- Leiorreuma patellulum (Fée) Staiger (2002)
- Leiorreuma sericeum (Eschw.) Staiger (2002)
- Leiorreuma subpatellulum U.Dubey, Upreti & Nayaka (2010) – India
- Leiorreuma taiwanense M.Nakan., Kashiw. & K.H.Moon (2008) – Taiwan
- Leiorreuma vaginans (Zahlbr.) A.W.Archer (2007)
- Leiorreuma vicarians (Vain.) M.Nakan. & Kashiw. (2003)
- Leiorreuma yakushimense (M.Nakan.) M.Nakan. & Kashiw. (2003) – Japan
