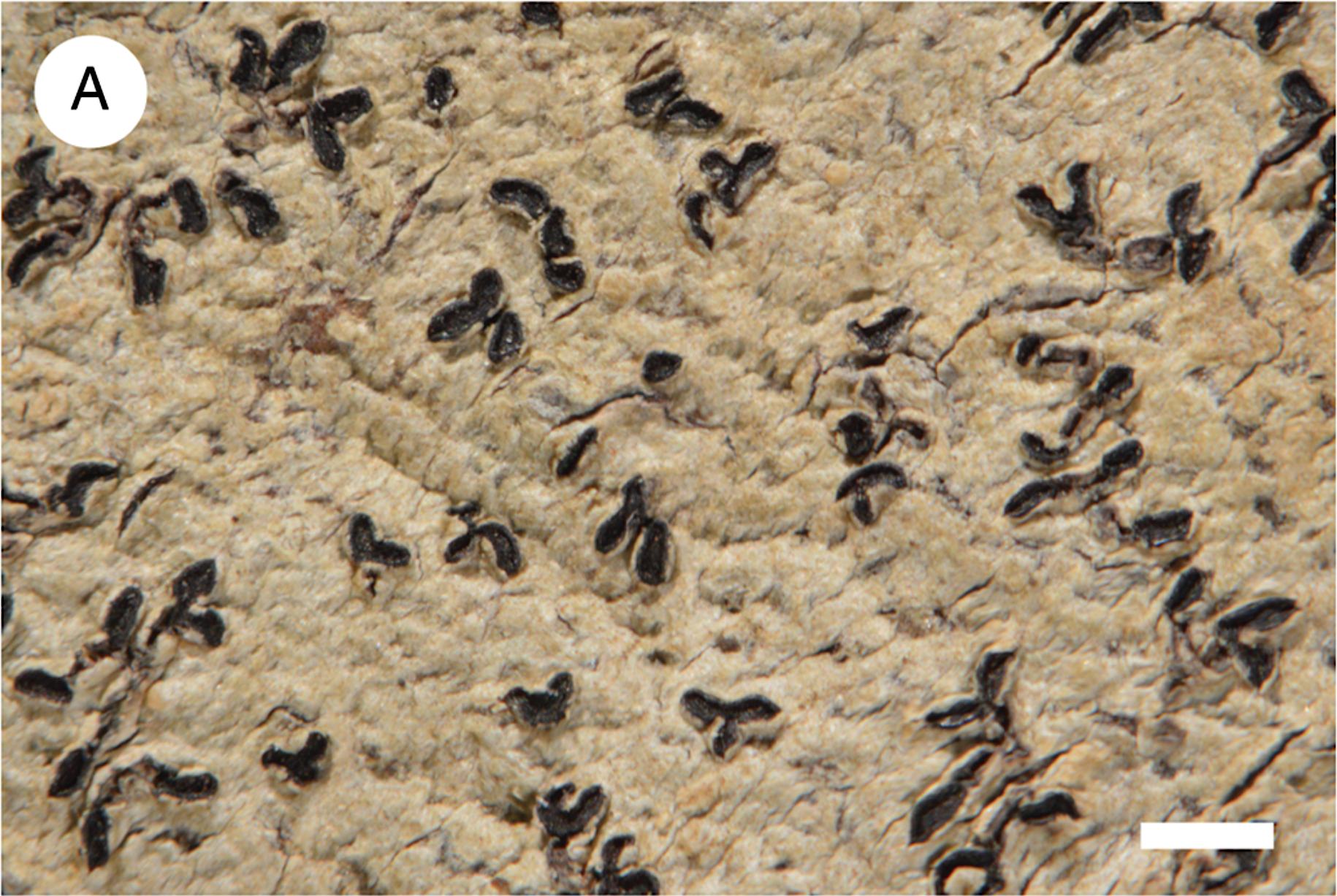
- Mangoldia bylii; scale bar = 1 mm

Scientific classification
- Domain: Eukaryota
- Kingdom: Fungi
- Division: Ascomycota
- Class: Lecanoromycetes
- Order: Graphidales
- Family: Graphidaceae
- Genus: Mangoldia; Lücking, Parnmen & Lumbsch (2012)

Type species
- Mangoldia australiana Lücking, Parnmen & Lumbsch (2012)

Species
- M. australiana M. bylii M. lecideicarpa M. thallolomoides

= Mangoldia =

Genus of lichens

Mangoldia is a genus of lichen-forming fungi in the subfamily Graphidoideae of the family Graphidaceae. It contains four species of corticolous (bark-dwelling) script lichens.

== Taxonomy ==
The genus was circumscribed in 2012 by the lichenologists Robert Lücking, Sittiporn Parnmen, and H. Thorsten Lumbsch. It was made to hold two Australian species that have Phaeographis-like ascomata (fruiting bodies) but Graphis-like ascospores. The genus name honours Armin Mangold, "for his outstanding contribution to the knowledge of thelotremoid Graphidaceae in Australia".

Mangoldia is in the tribe Graphideae, subfamily Graphidoideae of the family Graphidaceae. Mangoldia has a sister taxon relationship with genus Allographa.

== Description ==
The thallus of the Mangoldia species is corticolous, meaning it primarily grows on the bark of trees. It is continuous and partly endoperidermal, indicating that part of the thallus grows beneath the outer bark layer. The surface of the thallus is uneven and white. When observed in cross-section, it features a very thin, corticiform (bark-like) layer and an irregular layer containing algal cells that are essential for photosynthesis.

Apothecia (fruiting bodies) emerge from the thallus and are angular to lirelliform (slit-shaped). The disc of the apothecia is exposed and ranges in colour from blackish brown to black, without any powdery or waxy covering (epruinose). The thalline margin around the disc is thin, white, and may be fissured to lobulated. The proper margin, which is distinct from the thalline margin, is thin, stands out prominently, and is black. In a cross-section, this margin appears very thin and consists of densely packed fungal cells (prosoplectenchymatous), which are pale yellowish to brownish on the outer parts. There are no periphysoids (hair-like structures) present.

The hymenium (the spore-bearing layer) does not contain interspersed particles, and the paraphyses (sterile filaments within the hymenium) are unbranched. The ascospores, which are spores produced within the asci (spore-producing cells), number 4 to 8 per ascus. They are muriform (divided by both transverse and longitudinal septa), ellipsoid in shape, and have thickened septa that stain violet-blue with iodine, with rounded internal spaces (lumina) and are colourless. No chemical substances were detected in this genus when tested with thin-layer chromatography, suggesting a lack of distinctive secondary metabolites typically used for identifying and classifying lichens.

== Species ==
Mangoldia has four species:

- Mangoldia australiana Lücking, Parnmen & Lumbsch (2012) – Australia
- Mangoldia bylii (Vain.) I.Medeiros (2022) – Australia; South Africa
- Mangoldia lecideicarpa (Zahlbr.) Lücking, M.Cáceres & Aptroot (2024) – Brazil
- Mangoldia thallolomoides Aptroot, Lücking & M.Cáceres (2024) – Brazil

Mangoldia atronitens (A.W.Archer) Lücking, Parnmen & Lumbsch (2012), one of the original Australian species originally included in the genus, was shown to differ from Mangoldia bylii by only minute differences in spore size, and so Ian Medeiros and François Lutzoni treated them to be synonymous in a 2022 publication, further noting that "previously unrecognized presence of this genus in South Africa highlights biogeographical connections between southern Africa and Australasia".
