= Creographa =

Scientific classification
- Kingdom: Fungi
- Division: Ascomycota
- Class: Lecanoromycetes
- Order: Graphidales
- Family: Graphidaceae
- Genus: Creographa; A.Massal. (1860)

Type species
- Creographa brasiliensis A.Massal. (1860)

Species
- C. brasiliensis C. subbrasiliensis

Genus of lichens

Creographa is a small genus of lichen-forming fungi in the family Graphidaceae. It has two species. The genus was circumscribed in 1860 by the Italian lichenologist Abramo Bartolommeo Massalongo, with the type species C. brasiliensis. A second species, C. subbrasiliensis, was added to the genus in 2014. It occurs in Thailand.
