= Pliariona =

Scientific classification
- Kingdom: Fungi
- Division: Ascomycota
- Class: Lecanoromycetes
- Order: Graphidales
- Family: Graphidaceae
- Genus: Pliariona; A.Massal. (1860)
- Species: P. montagnei

Binomial name
- Pliariona montagnei (Bosch) A.Massal. (1860)

Synonyms
- Graphis montagnei Bosch (1855); Lecanactis montagnei (Bosch) Nyl. (1858); Graphina montagnei (Bosch) Müll.Arg. (1880); Phaeographina montagnei (Bosch) Müll.Arg. (1882); Thecaria montagnei (Bosch) Staiger (2002)

Single-species lichen genus

Pliariona is a fungal genus in the family Graphidaceae. It comprises the single species Pliariona montagnei, a corticolous (bark-dwelling) script lichen widely distributed across various tropical and subtropical regions.

== Taxonomy ==
Pliariona was originally circumscribed by the Italian lichenologist Abramo Bartolommeo Massalongo in 1860, to contain a script lichen species that was originally named Graphis montagnei by the Dutch botanist Roelof Benjamin van den Bosch.

The genus Pliariona was reinstated in 2013 based on molecular phylogenetics studies that revealed distinct lineages within the Graphidaceae. These studies showed that species previously grouped under the same genus due to morphological similarities were not always closely related. For example, Pliariona montagnei (formerly known as Thecaria montagnei) and Thecaria quassicola, despite their superficial resemblance, were found to be genetically distant and not congeneric.

The reinstatement of Pliariona as a separate genus is supported by molecular evidence and key taxonomic characteristics that distinguish it from related genera. These distinguishing features include an epruinose apothecial disc (the spore-producing surface lacking a powdery coating) and a dark red hymenium (the fertile layer of the fungus).

== Description ==
Pliariona montagnei has a thallus that ranges in colour from olive to dull green, with a glossy appearance. The surface texture varies from smooth to warty, often reflecting the contours of the underlying bark substrate. The species is characterised by its numerous ascomata (fruiting bodies), which are sessile and lirellate in form. These reproductive structures are predominantly simple, though some display occasional branching, and measure up to 0.6 mm by 0.5 mm. The ascomata feature an open disc that is red and epruinose, surrounded by a well-developed exciple. This exciple is fully carbonised (blackened), measuring 130 to 250 μm, and is covered by a thick, unbroken thalline margin.

The hymenium, which measures 150–200 μm in height, is red-pigmented and densely inspersed. Within this layer, the asci (spore-bearing sacs) each contain a single ascospore. These ascospores are muriform, ellipsoidal to oval in shape, and measure 125–155 μm by 25–40 μm. Initially hyaline and non-amyloid, the spores develop a brownish or mottled appearance as they mature. The species contains the compound isohypocrelline, though the biological significance of this substance in P. montagnei remains unclear. The combination of these morphological and chemical characteristics distinguishes P. montagnei from other superficially similar species within the Graphidaceae.

== Habitat and distribution ==
Pliariona montagnei exhibits a wide distribution across various tropical and subtropical regions. The species has been documented in Australia, West Africa, Japan, the Philippines, India, Indonesia, the Solomon Islands, Vanuatu, and Norfolk Island. It has more recently been recorded in Vietnam, specifically in Đắk Lắk province, within Chư Yang Sin National Park.

The species is corticolous, growing on tree bark. In the Vietnamese location where it was observed, P. montagnei was found at an elevation of about 780 metres above sea level.
