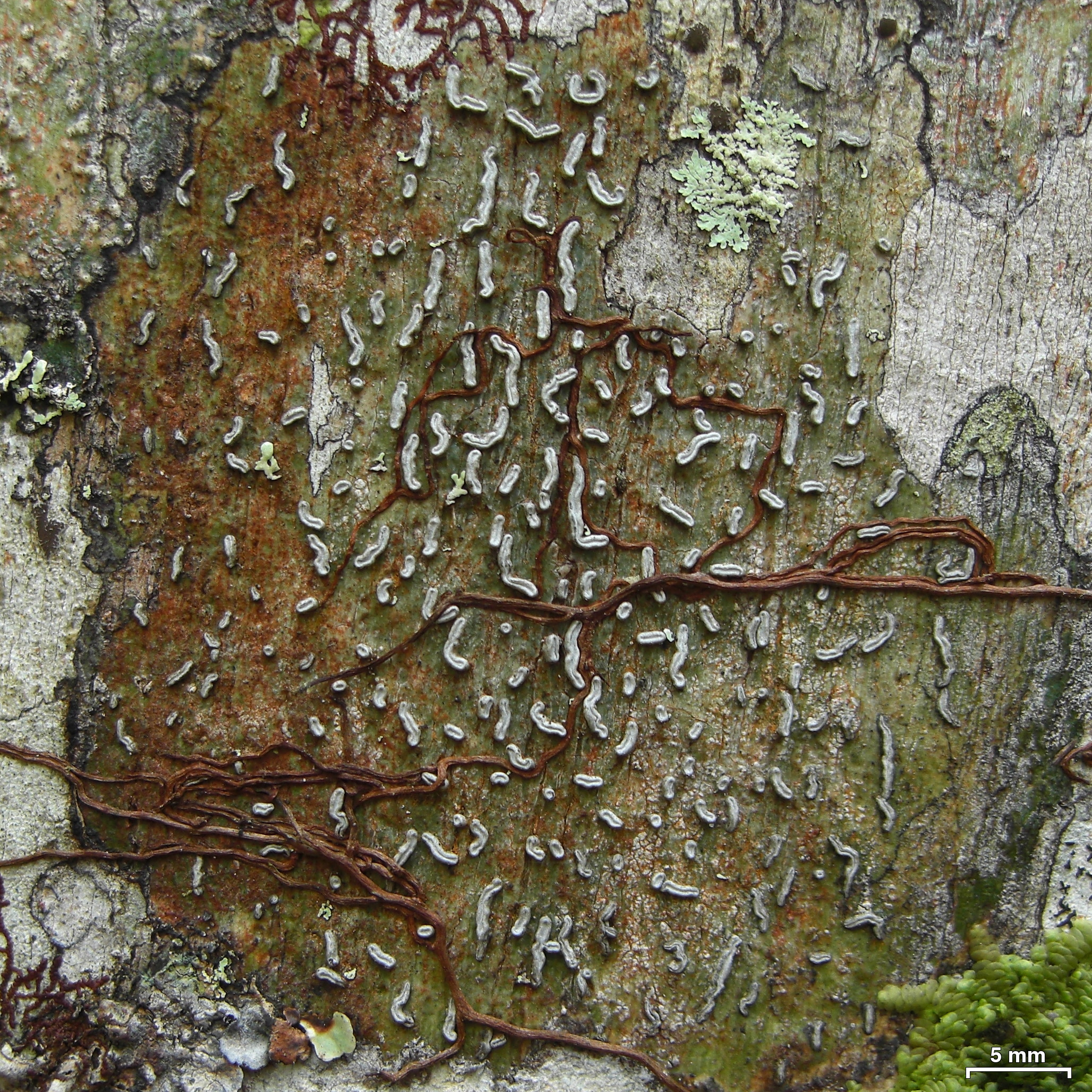
- Thecaria quassiicola

Scientific classification
- Domain: Eukaryota
- Kingdom: Fungi
- Division: Ascomycota
- Class: Lecanoromycetes
- Order: Graphidales
- Family: Graphidaceae
- Genus: Thecaria; Fée (1825)

Type species
- Thecaria quassiicola Fée (1825)

Species
- T. amnicola T. austroindica T. quassiicola

= Thecaria =

Genus of lichen-forming fungi

Thecaria is a genus of lichen-forming fungi in the family Graphidaceae.
