= Melanotrema =

Scientific classification
- Domain: Eukaryota
- Kingdom: Fungi
- Division: Ascomycota
- Class: Lecanoromycetes
- Order: Graphidales
- Family: Graphidaceae
- Genus: Melanotrema; Frisch (2006)

Type species
- Melanotrema platystomum (Mont.) Frisch (2006)

Genus of lichen-forming fungi

Melanotrema is a genus of lichen-forming fungi in the family Graphidaceae. The genus was circumscribed by German lichenologist Andreas Frisch in 2006, with M. platystomum assigned as the type species.

== Species ==
As of March 2023, Species Fungorum (in the Catalogue of Life) accepts 12 species of Melanotrema.

- Melanotrema astrolucens (Sipman) Frisch (2006)
- Melanotrema columellatum (Nyl.) Mangold (2009)
- Melanotrema comosum Sipman (2014)
- Melanotrema endomelaenum (Müll.Arg.) Mangold (2009)
- Melanotrema foratum (Nyl.) Frisch (2006)
- Melanotrema lirelliforme (Tuck.) Frisch (2006)
- Melanotrema lynceodes (Nyl.) Rivas Plata, Lücking & Lumbsch (2014)
- Melanotrema meiospermoides (Hale) Frisch (2006)
- Melanotrema meiospermum (Nyl.) Frisch (2006)
- Melanotrema melanophthalmum (Homchant. & Coppins) Papong & Lumbsch (2010)
- Melanotrema platystomum (Mont.) Frisch (2006)
- Melanotrema submicrosporoides (Nagarkar, Sethy & Patw.) S.Joshi & Lücking (2018)
