= Graphidaceae =

- Graphis desquamescens

Scientific classification
- Kingdom: Fungi
- Division: Ascomycota
- Class: Lecanoromycetes
- Order: Graphidales
- Family: Graphidaceae; Dumort. (1822)

Type genus
- Graphis Adans. (1763)

Subfamilies
- Fissurinoideae; Graphidoideae

Synonyms
- Asterothyriaceae Walt.Watson (1929); Diploschistaceae Zahlbr. (1905); Fissurinaceae B.P.Hodk. (2012)); Thelotremataceae Stizenb. (1862)

Family of fungi

The Graphidaceae are a family of lichen-forming fungi in the order Graphidales. The family contains nearly a hundred genera and more than 2000 species. Although the family has a cosmopolitan distribution, most Graphidaceae species occur in tropical regions, and typically grow on bark. These lichens are characterized by their crust-like growth form and typically partner with orange-pigmented Trentepohlia algae. Many species produce distinctive elongated, slit-like fruiting bodies, and some have unusually large ascospores that can begin germinating almost immediately upon release. The family originated approximately 176 million years ago and has diversified steadily since, with major bursts of new species arising alongside the spread of flowering plants and tropical rainforests.

== Taxonomy ==
Graphidaceae was originally proposed by French botanist Barthélemy Charles Joseph Dumortier in 1822 (as "Graphineae"). Graphis, Opegrapha, and Arthonia were included in the new family.

In 2002, the German lichenologist Bettina Staiger revised the Graphidaceae in a monograph, proposing a new classification of genera that was widely accepted until molecular phylogenetic studies led to a further reorganization of the family.

Two subfamilies are recognized in the Graphidaceae:

- Fissurinoideae Rivas Plata, Lücking & Lumbsch (2011)
- Graphidoideae Rivas Plata, Lücking & Lumbsch (2011)

Subfamily Redonographoideae, proposed by Lücking and colleagues in 2013, has since been promoted to familial status (as the monogeneric family Redonographaceae).

=== Synonymy ===
The family Thelotremataceae was placed in synonymy with Graphidaceae in 2008, after molecular phylogenetic analysis showed that the families formed several lineages within one strongly supported monophyletic lineage. This study also showed that many genera in Graphidaceae and Thelotremataceae were paraphyletic or polyphyletic. In 2018, Kraichak and colleagues, using a "temporal phylogenetic" approach to identify temporal bands for specific taxonomic ranks, proposed removing Fissurina from the Graphidaceae and instead as placing it as the type genus of Fissurinaceae, a family originally proposed by Brendan P. Hodkinson in 2012. They similarly suggested recognizing Diploschistaceae and Thelotremataceae as independent families. This taxonomic proposal was rejected by Robert Lücking in a critical 2019 review of the temporal method for the classification of lichen-forming fungi, using these specific examples to highlight several drawbacks of this approach. He noted "there is substantial loss of information content in this alternative classification at the second most important rank, the level of family, and such a revised classification is practically meaningless. It makes more sense to apply such essentially phylogenetic classifications, with less information content, to infraranks, such as subfamily or tribe".

== Description ==
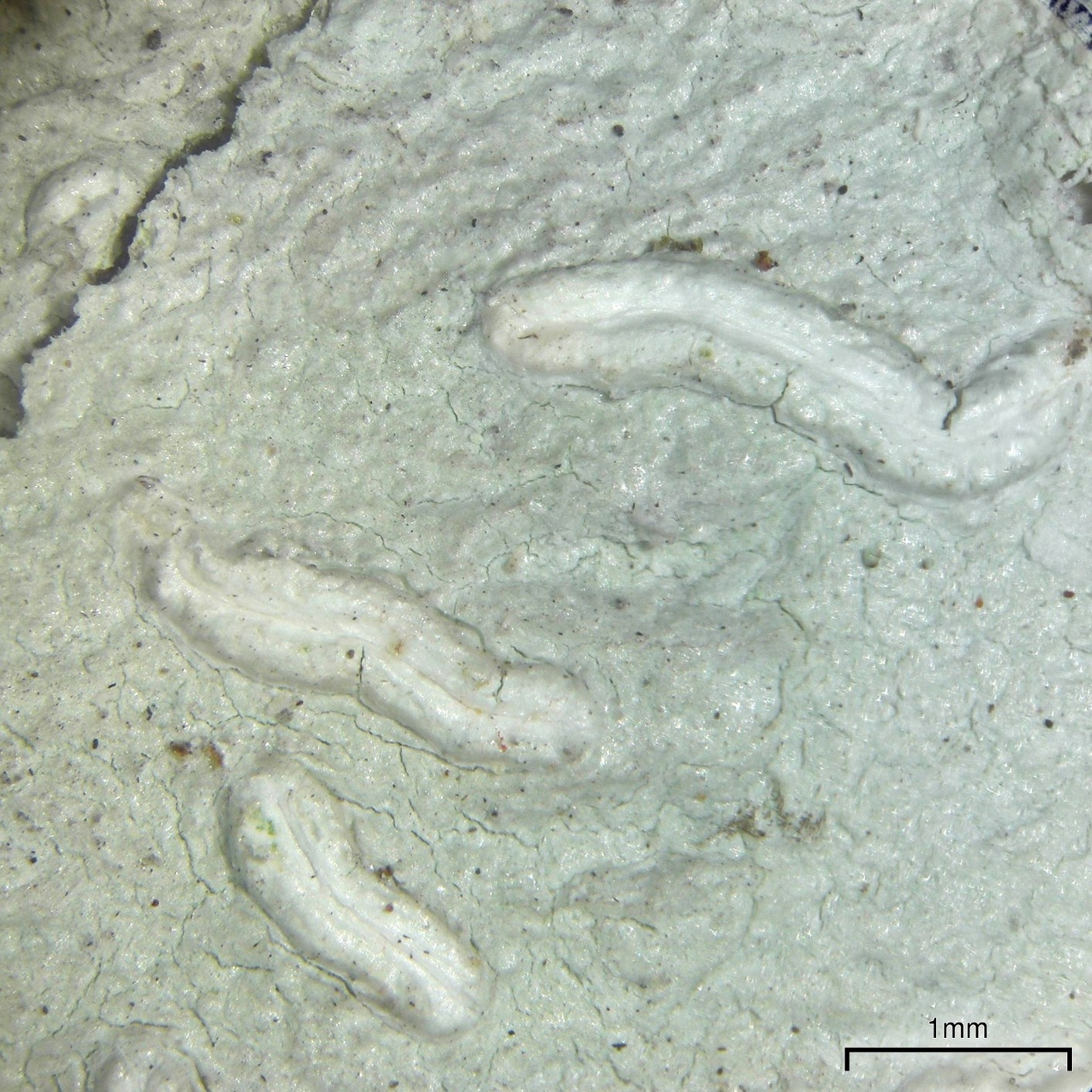
Closeup of the lirellae of Acanthothecis abaphoides

The photosynthetic partner (photobiont) of Graphidaceae fungi is typically green algae from the genus Trentepohlia, or very rarely Trebouxia. The lichen thallus is typically crustose, which means it forms a crust-like structure on the substrate it grows on. The form of the ascomata of Graphidaceae are usually apothecioid (cup-shaped), lirellate (narrow, and slit-like) or perithecioid (round or oval-shaped structure and embedded in the substrate), but can be rarely mazaediate (with a powdery mass of ascospores and paraphyses formed by the disintegration of the asci). They are usually zeorine (with both a thalline exciple and a proper exciple), but are sometimes lecideine (without a thallus margin) or lecanorine (surrounded by a pale thalline margin). The hamathecium, which is the hyphae and tissue that between the asci, consists of usually unbranched, sometimes capitate, rarely branched and anastomosing paraphyses. In some lineages, the paraphyses may be apically spinulose (covered with small spines or projections at the tips), and there may be lateral periphysoids in some lineages. The asci are annelasceous, which means they have a ring structure protruding into the lumen and with an apical tholus. They are non-amyloid or amyloid in some lineages, such as in the genus Diorygma. The asci are clavate to oblong or fusiform in shape.

The ascospores of Graphidaceae are most often produced eight per ascus, but in some lineages the number is frequently reduced to four, two, or even one. They range from simply transversely septate to muriform (divided into many compartments by both transverse and longitudinal septa), and are typically ellipsoid to oblong. In many species the spore wall is built as an inner endospore separated by distosepta, giving lens-shaped to rounded lumina; this combination of features is often referred to as "graphidoid". Spores may remain hyaline or become brown with age, and the endospore commonly reacts as amyloid. Graphidaceae also form pycnidia that produce conidia; these asexual spores are usually hyaline, non-septate, and oblong.

Some graphidaceous species have exceptionally large ascospores. In Ocellularia, the spores of O. subpraestans have been reported to reach about 880 × 65 micrometres in size, and can protrude through the apothecial pore and begin germinating almost immediately, with germ tubes produced from multiple cells of the muriform spore. Observations like these have been used to argue that very large, many-celled spores may favour establishment (and survival) even when dispersal is imperfect, including scenarios where spores are damaged or partly consumed during transport, potentially by invertebrates.

== Distribution and ecology ==
The vast majority of Graphidaceae species are restricted to the tropics. Most Graphidaceae species are epiphytic (i.e. they grow only on plants). Forty-two species are known from the Galápagos Islands, where they are among the most diverse of the crustose lichens there. Mexico is thought to be a biodiversity hotspot of undiscovered Graphidaceae species, with about 430 species predicted to occur in tropical regions, compared to less than 200 recorded in the entire country.

== Diversification ==
Analyses of time-calibrated phylogenies indicate that Graphidaceae has diversified steadily over deep time. The family is estimated to have originated about 176 million years ago (Ma), with comparatively low, fairly uniform speciation rates (about 0.06–0.10 lineages per million years) and brief accelerations early in its history and again around about 110 and 65 Ma. Two hyper-diverse clades—Graphideae and Ocellularia sensu stricto—show the highest rates, and the most frequently inferred models include rate shifts near the stems of one or both of these groups. Cohort analyses recover pronounced heterogeneity across the family, resolving five broad diversification regimes rather than a single family-wide pattern. No clear correlation is evident between Graphidaceae speciation rates and long-term global temperature trends over the past ~180 million years.

The observed pattern is consistent with lineage-specific and ecological drivers. Graphidaceae is largely tropical, and major clades tend to occupy different microhabitats—for example, Ocellularia s.str. is characteristic of shaded, protected tropical forest, whereas many Graphideae occur in more exposed sites—suggesting diversification linked to habitat differences rather than uniform climatic forcing. Pulses of diversification coincide with major events in plant and Earth history: Graphideae began diversifying soon after the origin of angiosperms (c. 140 Ma), and Ocellularia s.str. diversified around the Cretaceous–Paleogene boundary (c. 65 Ma), contemporaneous with the expansion of angiosperm-dominated tropical rainforests; a perithecial columella in Ocellularia is also associated with higher diversification in trait-dependent analyses, consistent with a possible key innovation (pp. 5–6). Because species discovery is incomplete (recent estimates suggest the true species count may exceed 4,000) future taxonomic sampling may refine rate estimates and their timing.

== Genera ==
According to the Catalogue of Life, there are 94 genera and more than 2100 species in Graphidaceae. In terms of number of species, Graphidaceae is the second-largest family of lichen-forming fungi, after the Parmeliaceae (2765 species) and ahead of the Verrucariaceae (943 species). The following list gives the genus name, its taxonomic authority, year of publication, and the number of species:

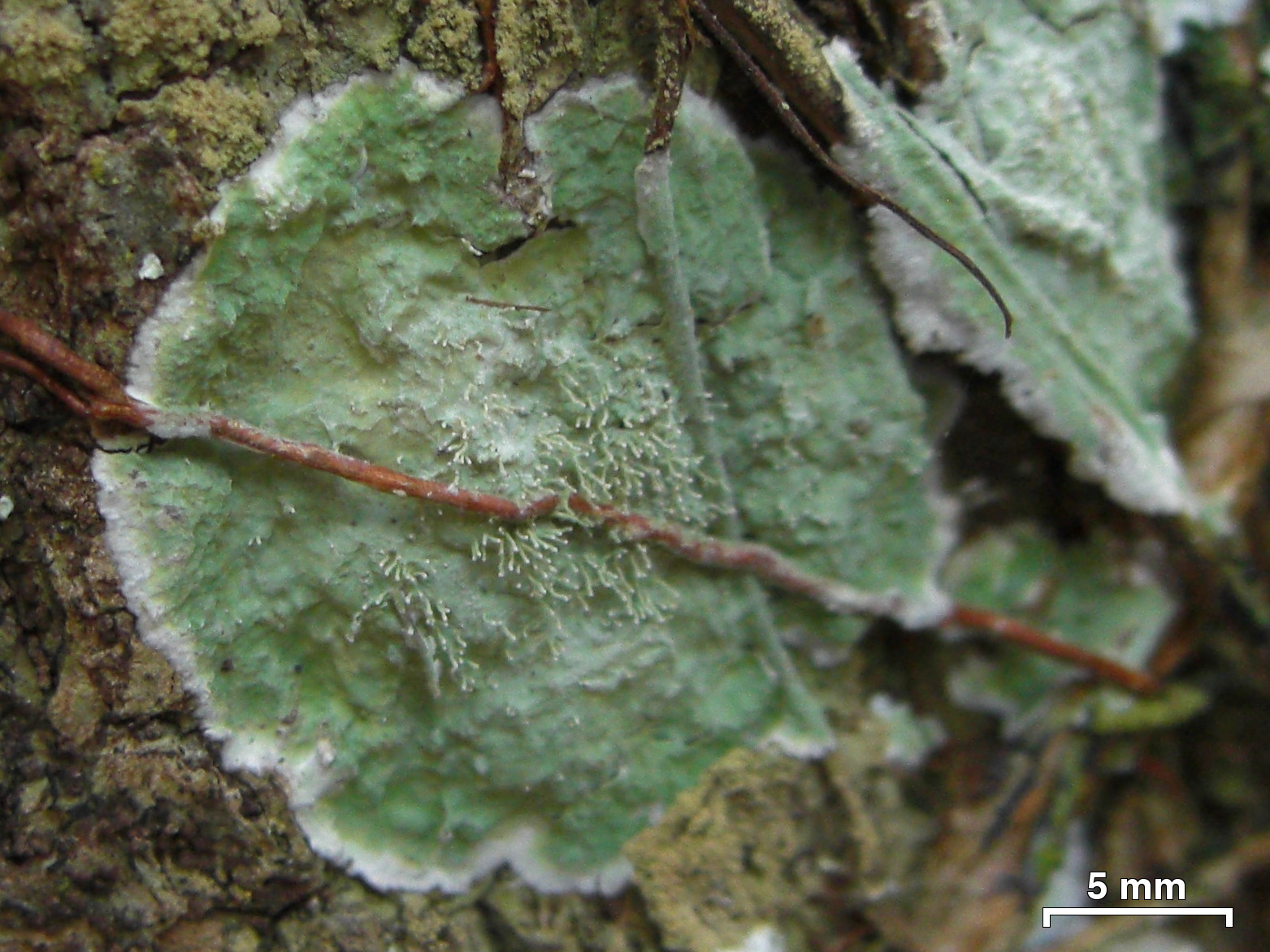
Diorygma antillarum

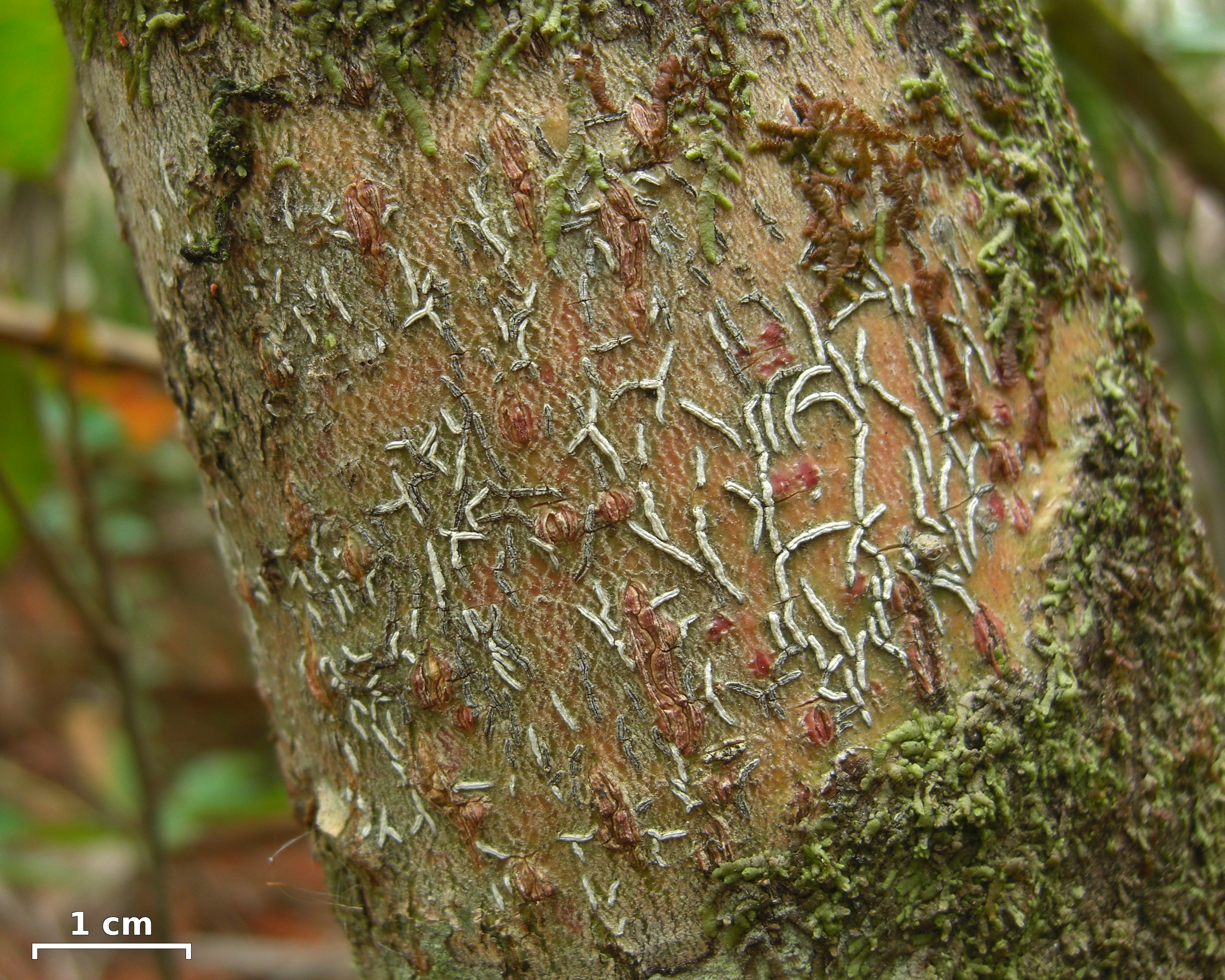
Dyplolabia afzelii

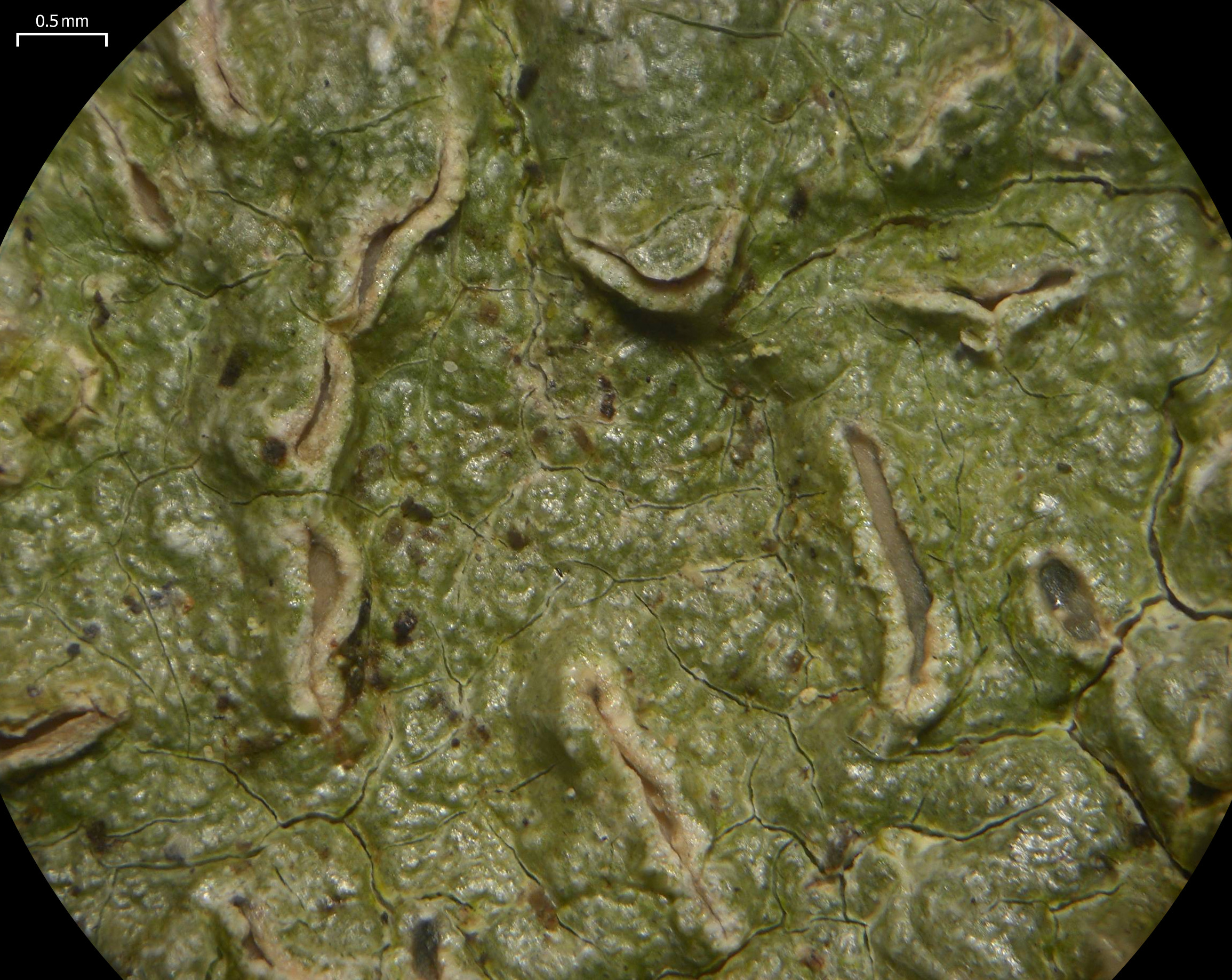
Fissurina insidiosa

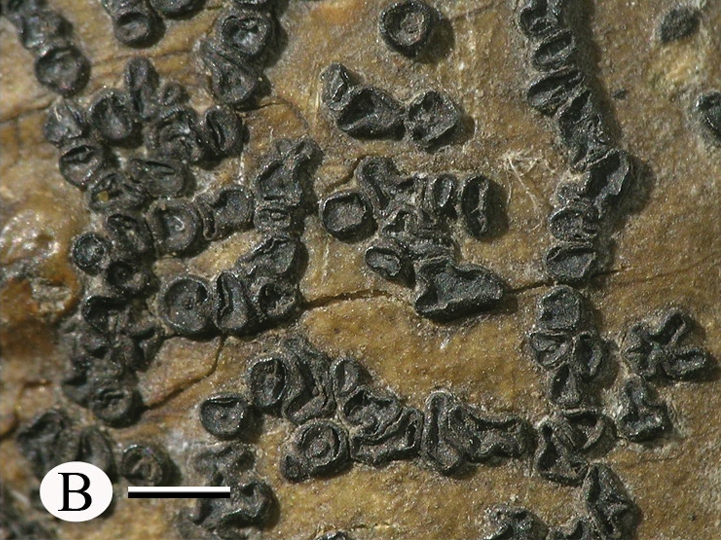
Phaeographina obfirmata

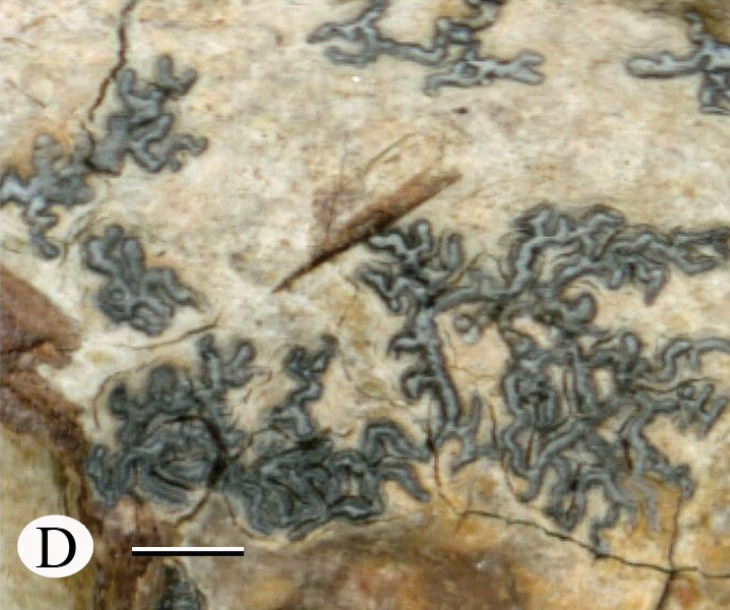
Sarcographa glyphiza

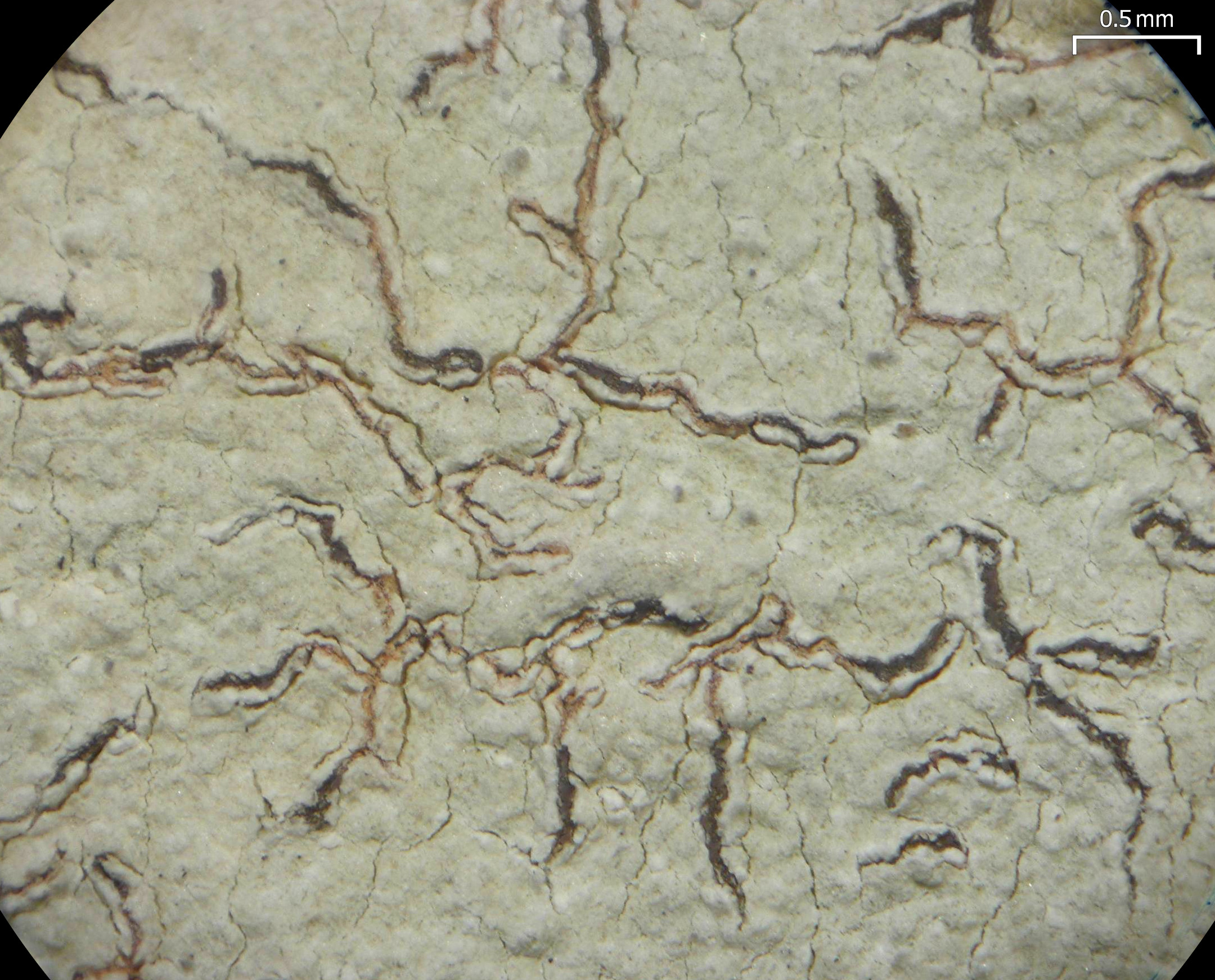
Platythecium hypoleptum

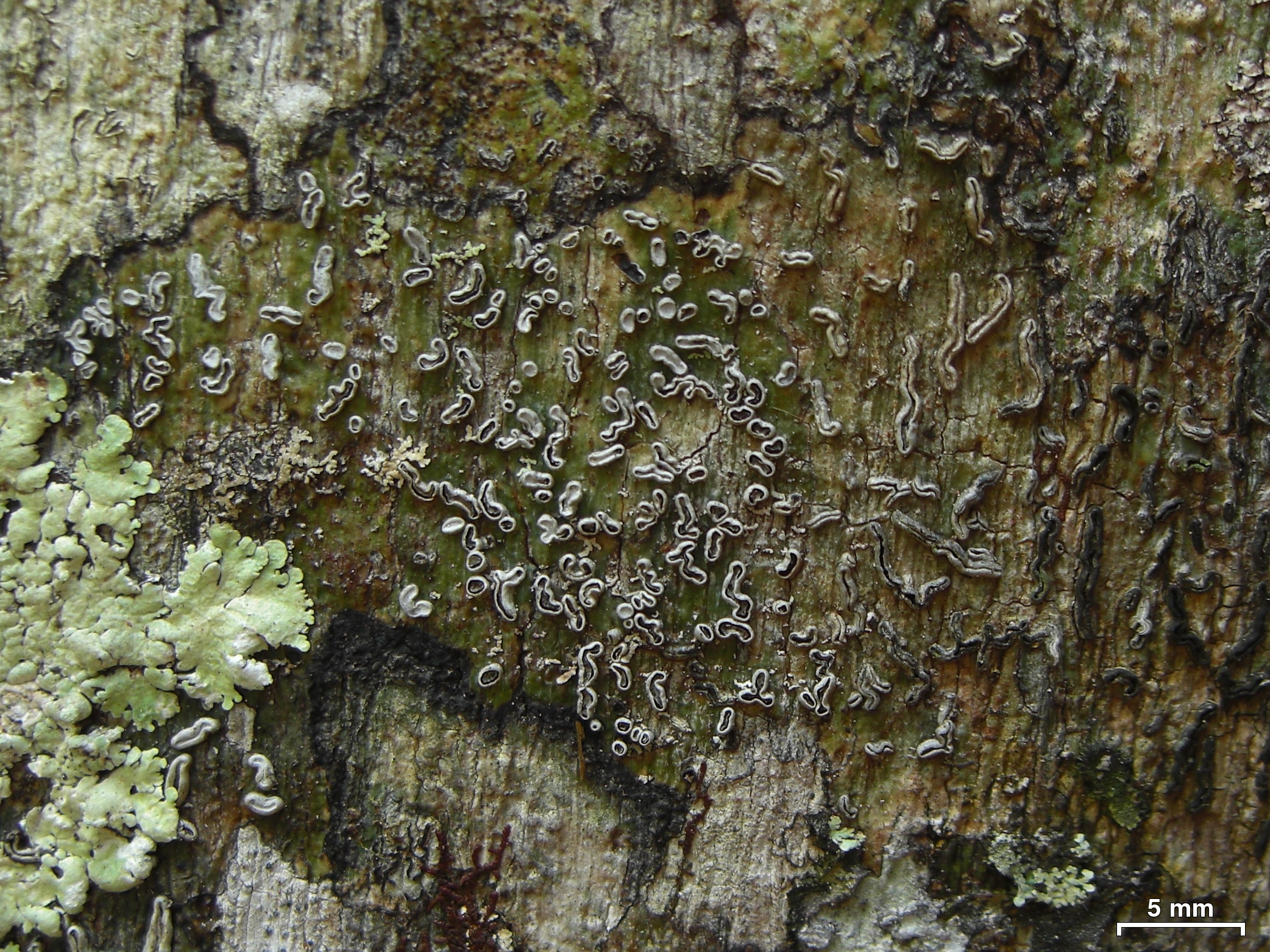
Thecaria quassicola

- Acanthothecis Clem. (1909) – 5 spp.
- Acanthotrema Frisch (2006) – 1 sp.
- Aggregatorygma M.Cáceres, Aptroot & Lücking (2014) – 3 spp.
- Allographa Chevall. (1824) – 183 spp.
- Amazonotrema Kalb & Lücking (2009) – 1 sp.
- Ampliotrema Kalb (2006) – 1 sp.
- Anomalographis Kalb (1992) – 2 spp.
- Anomomorpha Nyl. ex Hue (1891) – 8 spp.
- Asteristion Leight. (1870) – 7 spp.
- Astrochapsa Parnmen, Lücking & Lumbsch (2012) – 29 spp.
- Austrotrema I.Medeiros, Lücking & Lumbsch (2017) – 3 spp.
- Borinquenotrema Merc.-Díaz, Lücking & Parnmen (2014) – 1 sp.
- Byssotrema M.Cáceres, Aptroot & Lücking (2014) – 1 sp.
- Carbacanthographis Staiger & Kalb (2002) – 22 spp.
- Chapsa A.Massal. (1860) – 51 spp.
- Chroodiscus (Müll.Arg.) Müll.Arg. (1890) – 17 spp.
- Clandestinotrema Rivas Plata, Lücking & Lumbsch (2012) – 17 spp.
- Compositrema Rivas Plata, Lücking & Lumbsch (2012) – 4 spp.
- Corticorygma M.Cáceres, S.C.Feuerst., Aptroot & Lücking (2014) – 1 sp.
- Creographa A.Massal. (1860) – 1 spp.
- Cruentotrema Rivas Plata, Papong, Lumbsch & Lücking (2012) – 6 spp.
- Crutarndina Parnmen, Lücking & Lumbsch (2012) – 1 sp.
- Cryptoschizotrema Aptroot, Lücking & M.Cáceres (2019) – 2 spp.
- Cyclographina D.D.Awasthi (1979) – 8 spp.
- Diaphorographis A.W.Archer & Kalb (2009) – 2 spp.
- Diorygma Eschw. (1824) – 74 spp.
- Diploschistes Norman (1852) – 25 spp.
- Dyplolabia A.Massal. (1854) – 5 spp.
- Enigmotrema Lücking (2012) – 1 sp.
- Fibrillithecis Frisch (2006) – 15 spp.
- Fissurina Fée (1825) – 117 spp.
- Gintarasia Kraichak, Lücking & Lumbsch (2013) – 7 spp.
- Glaucotrema Rivas Plata & Lumbsch (2012) – 5 spp.
- Glyphis Ach. (1814) – 7 spp.
- Graphina Müll.Arg. (1880) – 25 spp.
- Graphis Adans. (1763) – ca. 275 spp.
- Gyrotrema Frisch (2006) – 6 spp.
- Halegrapha Rivas Plata & Lücking (2011) – 9 spp.
- Heiomasia Nelsen, Lücking & Rivas Plata (2010) – 3 spp.
- Hemithecium Trevis. (1853) – ca. 50 spp.
- Jocatoa R.Miranda (2020) – 1 sp.
- Kalbographa Lücking (2007) – 5 spp.
- Leiorreuma Eschw. (1824) – 18 spp.
- Leptotrema Mont. & Bosch (1856) – 14 spp.
- Leucodecton A.Massal. (1860) – 32 spp.
- Malmographina M.Cáceres, Rivas Plata & Lücking (2011) – 1 sp.
- Mangoldia Lücking, Parnmen & Lumbsch (2012) – 4 spp.
- Melanotopelia Lumbsch & Mangold (2008) – 4 spp.
- Melanotrema Frisch (2006) – 12 spp.
- Myriochapsa M.Cáceres, Lücking & Lumbsch (2013) – 3 spp.
- Myriotrema Fée (1825) – 76 spp.
- Nadvornikia Tibell (1984) – 5 spp.
- Nitidochapsa Parnmen, Lücking & Lumbsch (2013) – 5 spp.
- Ocellularia G.Mey. (1825) – 343 spp.
- Pallidogramme Staiger, Kalb & Lücking (2008) – 13 spp.
- Paratopeliopsis Merc.-Díaz, Lücking & Parnmen (2014) – 1 sp.
- Phaeographina Müll.Arg. (1882) – 11 spp.
- Phaeographis Müll.Arg. (1882) – ca. 180 spp.
- Phaeographopsis Sipman (1997) – 3 spp.
- Phaeotrema Müll.Arg. (1887) – 19 spp.
- Platygramme Fée (1874) – 30 spp.
- Platythecium Staiger (2002) – 27 spp.
- Pliariona A.Massal. (1860) – 1 sp.
- Polistroma Clemente ex Ach. (1814) – 1 sp.
- Pseudochapsa Parnmen, Lücking & Lumbsch (2012) – 18 spp.
- Pseudoramonia Kantvilas & Vězda (2000) – 4 spp.
- Pseudotopeliopsis Parnmen, Lücking & Lumbsch (2012) – 4 spp.
- Pycnotrema Rivas Plata & Lücking (2012) – 2 spp.
- Redingeria Frisch (2006) – 8 spp.
- Reimnitzia Kalb (2001) – 1 sp.
- Rhabdodiscus Vain. (1921) – 36 spp.
- Sanguinotrema Lücking (2015) – 1 sp.
- Sarcographa Fée (1825) – 37 spp.
- Sarcographina Müll.Arg. (1887) – 6 spp.
- Schistophoron Stirt. (1876) – 5 spp.
- Schistostoma Stirt. (1879) – 1 sp.
- Schizotrema Mangold & Lumbsch (2009) – 7 spp.
- Stegobolus Mont. (1845) – 16 spp.
- Thalloloma Trevis. (1853) – 20 spp.
- Thecaria Fée (1825) – 4 spp.
- Thecographa A.Massal. (1860) – 3 spp.
- Thelotrema Ach. (1803) – 165 spp.
- Topeliopsis Kantvilas & Vězda (2000) – 20 spp.
- Tremotylium Nyl. (1865) – 4 spp.
- Wirthiotrema Rivas Plata, Kalb, Frisch & Lumbsch (2010) – 5 spp.
- Xalocoa Kraichak, Lücking & Lumbsch (2013) – 1 sp.

The genus Medusulina, proposed by Johannes Müller Argoviensis in 1894, is not recognised: its type species, Medusulina nitida, belongs in Fissurina, which renders the name unavailable. Other species once placed there have been reassigned to Redonographa or Jocatoa.
