= Borinquenotrema =

Scientific classification
- Domain: Eukaryota
- Kingdom: Fungi
- Division: Ascomycota
- Class: Lecanoromycetes
- Order: Graphidales
- Family: Graphidaceae
- Genus: Borinquenotrema; Merc.-Díaz, Lücking & Parnmen (2014)
- Species: B. soredicarpum

Binomial name
- Borinquenotrema soredicarpum Mercado-Díaz, Lücking & Parnmen (2014)

Genus of lichens

Borinquenotrema is a single-species fungal genus in the family Graphidaceae. It contains the species Borinquenotrema soredicarpum, a corticolous (bark-dweling) lichen.

Found in Puerto Rico, this lichen is characterized by its carbonized (blackened and brittle) ascomata, which develop from within soralia, and its distinctive distoseptate, violet-blue ascospores. Borinquenotrema soredicarpum grows on tree trunks in shaded understory environments of Tabonuco forests in El Yunque National Forest.

== Taxonomy ==
The genus Borinquenotrema, along with its type species, Borinquenotrema soredicarpum, was described by lichenologists Joel Mercado-Díaz, Robert Lücking, and Sittiporn Parnmen. The type specimen was found by the first author in Luquillo, Puerto Rico, on the trunk of a Dacryodes excelsa tree. The genus name is derived from Borinquen, the indigenous name for Puerto Rico, and the species epithet soredicarpum refers to the unusual development of ascomata beneath soralia.

Initially mistaken for a species of Carbacanthographis, Borinquenotrema soredicarpum was later found to be closely related to the tribe Ocellularieae based on molecular sequence data. The development of ascomata beneath soralia is a strategy that may aid in the dispersal of soredia along with ascospores, ensuring the availability of photobiont cells upon resymbiosis. This lichen contains stictic acid and closely related substances, which is unusual for members of the tribe Ocellularieae.

== Description ==
Borinquenotrema soredicarpum is a corticolous lichen with a smooth to uneven, light greyish-green thallus that grows up to 2 cm (0.8 in) in diameter. Its soralia are white, granular, and maculiform to capitate, with diameters between 0.2 and 0.6 mm. The lichen's photobiont is Trentepohlia (a green algal genus), with densely packed, olive-green cells measuring 7–12 by 6–10 μm.

A feature of Borinquenotrema soredicarpum is the development of its ascomata beneath soralia, which remain covered by a layer of granular soredia even in mature condition, completely hiding the ascoma. The lichen's ascospores are hyaline, oblong-oval, muriform, and measure 40–50 by 12–15 μm. They are distoseptate with lens-shaped to rounded lumina and turn violet-blue when treated with iodine (I+).

== Habitat and distribution ==
Borinquenotrema soredicarpum is found exclusively in Puerto Rico, growing on the trunks of unidentified trees in the shaded understory of Tabonuco forests within El Yunque National Forest.
