= Byssotrema =

Scientific classification
- Kingdom: Fungi
- Division: Ascomycota
- Class: Lecanoromycetes
- Order: Graphidales
- Family: Graphidaceae
- Genus: Byssotrema; M.Cáceres, Aptroot & Lücking (2014)
- Species: B. mirabile

Binomial name
- Byssotrema mirabile M.Cáceres, Aptroot & Lücking (2014)
- Holotype: Cuniã Ecological Station, Brazil

Single-species lichen genus

Byssotrema is a monotypic fungal genus in the subfamily Graphidoideae of the family Graphidaceae. It contains the single species Byssotrema mirabile, a little-known corticolous (bark-dwelling), crustose lichen found only in Brazil.

== Taxonomy ==
Both the genus Byssotrema and its single species were described as new to science in 2014 by the lichenologists Marcela Cáceres, André Aptroot, and Robert Lücking. The type specimen of Byssotrema mirabile was collected in from the Cuniã Ecological Station (Rondônia), at kilometer 760 on road BR 319, northwest of Porto Velho, at an elevation of 100 m (330 ft). The specimen was found growing on tree bark in a primary rainforest on 13 March 2012 by Cáceres and Aptroot.

The genus name Byssotrema is derived from the Greek βύσσα, meaning "fine and soft fabric". The ending –trema is derived from the Greek neuter noun τρημα, meaning "perforation; aperture; opening; orifice", and refers to the widely open ascomata that are characteristic of the genus.

== Description ==
The thallus of Byssotrema mirabile can reach up to about 5 cm (2 in) in diameter and has a continuous, smooth surface with a greenish-grey colour. The thallus lacks a prothallus (a distinct boundary layer). In cross-section, the thallus is 70–100 μm thick and comprises a prosoplectenchymatous cortex (a type of cellular structure) 15–20 μm thick, a photobiont layer 30–40 μm thick, and a medulla 30–40 μm thick. The medulla contains numerous small, grey crystals that do not dissolve in potassium hydroxide solution. The photobiont, or photosynthetic partner, is from the green algal genus Trentepohlia, with cells that are rounded to irregular in shape, arranged in irregular groups, and yellowish-green in colour, measuring 7–11 by 6–9 μm.

The ascomata (fruiting bodies) are rounded to angular, prominent to sessile, and measure 0.5–1 mm in diameter and 0.4–0.5 mm in height. They feature a nearly complete, steeply sloping thalline margin that is smooth and greyish-green, with a distinct proper margin that appears as a thick, white rim around the pore. The disc of the ascomata is partially exposed, light brown, translucent, and thinly white-pruinose (having a frost-like appearance).

The excipulum (the outer layer of the ascomata) is apically carbonized, with orange-brown lateral and basal portions, 30–50 μm wide. It is covered laterally by an algiferous (algae-bearing), corticate thallus that lacks periderm layers and is 60–90 μm thick. The hypothecium (the layer below the hymenium) is prosoplectenchymatous, 10–15 μm high, and hyaline to yellowish. The hymenium (the spore-bearing layer) is 90–100 μm high, hyaline, and strongly inspersed (infused with granules), which rapidly dissolve in potassium hydroxide. The epithecium (the uppermost layer of the hymenium) is indistinct, 5–10 μm high, and hyaline.

The paraphyses (sterile filaments in the hymenium) are unbranched and smooth at the tips. The asci (spore sacs) are fusiform to clavate, measuring 80–90 by 10–12 μm. Each ascus contains 8 ellipsoid ascospores, which are 3-septate, measuring 11–15 by 6–7 μm, and 1.8–2.5 times as long as wide. The ascospores are hyaline, distoseptate with lens-shaped lumina, and react violet-blue with iodine.

== Habitat and distribution ==
Byssotrema mirabile is exclusively found in the primary rainforests of Rondônia, Brazil, where it grows in the shaded understory of rainforest environments undisturbed by man. It is only known to occur at its type locality.
