= Nitidochapsa =

Scientific classification
- Domain: Eukaryota
- Kingdom: Fungi
- Division: Ascomycota
- Class: Lecanoromycetes
- Order: Graphidales
- Family: Graphidaceae
- Genus: Nitidochapsa; Parnmen, Lücking & Lumbsch (2013)

Type species
- Nitidochapsa leprieurii (Mont.) Parnmen, Lücking & Lumbsch (2013)

Species
- N. aggregata N. leprieurii N. phlyctidea N. siamensis N. stictoides

Genus of lichens

Nitidochapsa is a genus of lichen-forming fungi in the family Graphidaceae. It has five species of corticolous (bark-dwelling), crustose lichens.

== Taxonomy ==
The genus was circumscribed in 2013 by the lichenologists Sittiporn Parnmen, Robert Lücking, and H. Thorsten Lumbsch. The type species is N. leprieurii, originally described in 1855 from specimens collected in French Guiana, as a member of Sticta.

== Description ==
The thallus of Nitidochapsa is continuous and can have a smooth to uneven surface, characterised by an olive-brown colour. When observed in a cross-section, the thallus of Nitidochapsa has a dense upper cortex composed of tightly packed cells (prosoplectenchymatous) and an irregular algal layer that partially lies beneath the bark's outer layer (endoperidermal). This genus typically lacks or rarely forms clusters of calcium oxalate, a common crystalline compound in many lichens.

The apothecia (fruiting bodies) Nitidochapsa are angular-rounded and emerge from the thallus (erumpent). The disc of the apothecia is light brown and covered with a fine white powder (white-pruinose), while the proper margin around the disc is indistinct. The thalline margin of the apothecia has 5 to 8 recurved lobules that are felty and white. A columella, or central pillar-like structure commonly found in some lichens' apothecia, is absent in this genus.

The excipulum (tissue surrounding the apothecia) is prosoplectenchymatous and varies in colour from hyaline (translucent) to pale brown. Nitidochapsa also features periphysoids, which are hair-like structures around the apothecial margin. The hymenium, the spore-producing layer, is clear, and the paraphyses (sterile filaments in the hymenium) are unbranched. Each ascus (spore-bearing cell) contains eight ascospores. These spores are 3-septate (divided into three compartments by septa), measuring 12–16 by 5–6 μm, oblong in shape, with thickened septa and lens-shaped (lenticular) lumina. The spores are dark brown and turn violet-blue with iodine staining (I+ violet-blue reaction). In terms of chemistry, Nitidochapsa does not produce any secondary metabolites.

== Species ==
As of January 2024, Species Fungorum (in the Catalogue of Life) accepts five species of Nitidochapsa:

- Nitidochapsa aggregata (Hale) Poengs., Lücking & Lumbsch (2014)
- Nitidochapsa leprieurii (Mont.) Parnmen, Lücking & Lumbsch (2013)
- Nitidochapsa phlyctidea (Vain.) Lücking & Lumbsch (2014)
- Nitidochapsa siamensis Poengs., Lücking & Lumbsch (2014) – Thailand
- Nitidochapsa stictoides (Leight.) Tehler, Lücking & Lumbsch (2014)
