= Polistroma =

Scientific classification
- Domain: Eukaryota
- Kingdom: Fungi
- Division: Ascomycota
- Class: Lecanoromycetes
- Order: Graphidales
- Family: Graphidaceae
- Genus: Polistroma; Clemente (1807)

Type species
- Polistroma fernandezii Clemente (1807)

Genus of lichen-forming fungi

Polistroma is a genus of lichenized fungi in the family Graphidaceae. This is a monotypic genus, containing the single species Polistroma fernandezii.
