= Pycnotrema =

Scientific classification
- Kingdom: Fungi
- Division: Ascomycota
- Class: Lecanoromycetes
- Order: Graphidales
- Family: Graphidaceae
- Genus: Pycnotrema; Rivas Plata & Lücking (2012)

Type species
- Pycnotrema pycnoporellum (Nyl.) Rivas Plata & Lücking (2012)

Species
- P. fissurinum P. pycnoporellum

Genus of lichens

Pycnotrema is a small genus of lichen-forming fungi in the family Graphidaceae. Its two species are characterised by their small, rounded apothecial (fruiting body) pores.

== Taxonomy ==
The genus was circumscribed by Eimy Rivas Plata and Robert Lücking in 2012, with Pycnotrema pycnoporellum assigned as the type species. The authors indicate that there are no well-defined characters that separate the genus from Ocellularia and Myriotrema (in the broad sense), but molecular analysis shows the lineage is distinct. This lichen was originally described by William Nylander in 1876 as a species of Thelotrema. A second species, P. fissurinum, was added to the genus in 2015. It is found in Puerto Rico. The genus name is derived from the epithet of the type species, pycnoporellum, combined with the suffix -trema. Pycnotrema is in the subfamily Fissurinoideae of the family Graphidaceae.

== Description ==
Pycnotrema is characterised by a thallus that is light grey-green and varies from smooth to uneven in texture. It features a dense, prosoplectenchymatous cortex—a compact, tissue-like layer of fungal cells that protects the photobiont layer beneath, where the photosynthesizing algae reside. This layer, along with the medulla—the innermost layer of the lichen—contains clusters of calcium oxalate crystals. The apothecia (fruiting bodies) of Pycnotrema are typically immersed within the thallus and rounded, often aligning in lines across the surface. These structures feature a disc that is usually covered by a narrow, reddish-coloured pore and surrounded by an entire, brown-black margin. Unlike some other lichens, Pycnotrema does not develop a columella, which is a central support structure found in some fungal fruits.

The wall surrounding the apothecial disc, known as the excipulum, is also prosoplectenchymatous and brown in colour, and lacks periphysoids—filamentous structures that can protrude from the margins of some lichens. The paraphyses (sterile filaments that fill the apothecium) are unbranched. The spores of Pycnotrema are produced eight per ascus (spore-bearing structure) and are submuriform—divided by multiple cross walls—ellipsoid in shape, and feature thick walls that divide the internal space into rounded compartments. These spores are colourless and turn violet-blue when treated with iodine, indicating the presence of amyloid compounds. In terms of chemistry, Pycnotrema does not produce any secondary metabolites.
