= Reimnitzia =

Scientific classification
- Domain: Eukaryota
- Kingdom: Fungi
- Division: Ascomycota
- Class: Lecanoromycetes
- Order: Graphidales
- Family: Graphidaceae
- Genus: Reimnitzia; Kalb (2001)

Type species
- Reimnitzia santensis (Tuck.) Kalb (2001)

Synonyms
- Leptotrema heterosporum (C.Knight) Zahlbr. (1923); Leptotrema mastoideum Müll.Arg. (1887); Leptotrema santense (Tuck.) Zahlbr. (1923); Thelotrema heterosporum C.Knight (1886); Thelotrema santense Tuck. (1862)

Single-species fungal genus

Reimnitzia is a fungal genus in the family Graphidaceae. This is a monotypic genus, containing the single lichen species Reimnitzia santensis. Established in 2001 by the German lichenologist Klaus Kalb and named after his friends Michael and Christine Reimnitz, this bark-dwelling lichen is found in tropical forests across the Americas, Africa, and Asia. The species is characterized by its tiny, script-like fruiting structures with thick black borders and serves as an indicator of undisturbed, humid woodland due to its sensitivity to forest disturbance.

== Taxonomy ==
Both the genus and species were described as new to science in 2001 by German lichenologist Klaus Kalb. The genus name honours Michael and Christine Reimnitz, friends of the author who assisted him with his lichen collections. The type species was originally named Theletrema santensis by American Edward Tuckerman, from specimens collected by Henry William Ravenel in South Carolina. The main characteristic of the lichen is the distinct epithecium formed by the densely interwoven upper parts of the paraphyses. Reimnitzia was originally classified in the Thelotremataceae, but that family has since been folded into the Graphidaceae.

== Description ==
Reimnitzia forms a smooth, pale grey to yellow-olive crust (thallus) that lies flush with the bark and lacks a true cortex. Its fruit bodies appear as tiny, mostly straight lirellae (0.3–1.2 mm long) that often gather in loose, radiating clusters; the thick flanks are entirely carbonised, so the narrow slits contrast sharply with the surrounding thallus. A colourless excipulum lines each lirella, overhung by a dull brown epithecium free of pruina. The hymenium is clear, non-inspersed, and traversed by smooth paraphyses. Eight hyaline ascospores mature in every Graphis-type ascus; they become distinctly muriform—partitioned by numerous transverse and a few longitudinal septa—yet remain iodine-negative (I–) and typically measure 25–55 × 8–14 μm. No lichen substances have been detected with thin-layer chromatography, a helpful trait for separating the genus from many chemically richer script lichens.

The combination of completely carbonised lirellae, an inspersion-free hymenium and large, I– muriform spores distinguishes Reimnitzia from superficially similar genera. Redingeria shares black margins but its hymenium is densely inspersed; Glyphis and Hemithecium possess longer or spinulose (spiny) filaments lining the opening; whereas Kalbographa is set apart by a vivid orange anthraquinone-containing epithecium absent from Reimnitzia.

== Habitat and distribution ==
Reimnitzia has a pantropical distribution, with confirmed records from lowland Amazonian rainforest, West-Central African evergreen stands and South-East Asian dipterocarp forest. All known specimens are corticolous, occupying the shaded trunks and large branches of mature trees; none have been found on rock or leaves. Field observations indicate a marked sensitivity to canopy opening: populations decline rapidly after selective logging or conversion to agroforestry, making Reimnitzia a practical indicator of humid, long-standing woodland. Reimnitzia santensis has also been recorded in Ecuador, and China.
