= Thecographa =

Scientific classification
- Domain: Eukaryota
- Kingdom: Fungi
- Division: Ascomycota
- Class: Lecanoromycetes
- Order: Graphidales
- Family: Graphidaceae
- Genus: Thecographa; A.Massal. (1860)

Type species
- Thecographa prosiliens (Mont. & Bosch) A.Massal. (1860)

Species
- T. ceramia T. crassilabra T. prosiliens

Synonyms
- Emblemia Pers. (1827); Megalographa A.Massal. (1860); Phaeographina Müll.Arg. (1882); Phaeographinomyces Cif. & Tomas. (1953)

Genus of lichens

Thecographa is a genus of lichen-forming fungi in the family Graphidaceae. It has three species of corticolous (bark-dwelling) script lichens. The genus was circumscribed by Abramo Bartolommeo Massalongo in 1860. Although Massalongo did not assign a type species for the genus, David L. Hawksworth set Thecographa prosiliens as the type in 1981. Morphological characteristics of the genus include its sessile lirella (fruiting bodies), the lack of a thalline margin, and the complete carbonisation of the excipulum.

== Description ==
The genus Thecographa features apothecia (fruiting bodies) that are initially closed and embedded (hypophloedal), but later erupt to become open, elevated, and urn-shaped (urceolate). These apothecia often appear almost stalked, and are characteristically flexible, twisted, and angular. They are rarely and sparsely branched. The apothecia are equipped with a distinctive, carbonaceous excipulum that is cup-shaped. This structure is thin but consistent, enveloped by the thallus or tree bark on which the lichen lives. Over time, the covering epidermis may gradually disappear.

The disc of the apothecia is gelatinous, flattened, and tends to lose its colour, supported by a solid, almost papery base known as the hypothecium. The asci (spore-producing structures) are club-shaped and contain 2-4-8 spores, accompanied by paraphyses (sterile filaments interspersed among the asci). The spores are elliptical or ovoid, muriform (with multiple divisions), initially transparent but becoming cloudy and opaque over time. The thallus of Thecographa is spread out and irregularly shaped, embedding itself into the substrate.

== Species ==
- Thecographa ceramia A.Massal. (1860)
- Thecographa crassilabra (Mont. & Bosch) A.Massal. (1860)
- Thecographa prosiliens (Mont. & Bosch) A.Massal. (1860)
