= Xalocoa =

Scientific classification
- Domain: Eukaryota
- Kingdom: Fungi
- Division: Ascomycota
- Class: Lecanoromycetes
- Order: Graphidales
- Family: Graphidaceae
- Genus: Xalocoa; Kraichak, Lücking & Lumbsch (2013)
- Species: X. ocellata

Binomial name
- Xalocoa ocellata (Fr.) Kraichak, Lücking & Lumbsch (2013)

Synonyms
- List: Diploschistes ocellatus (Fr.) Norman (1852); Diploschistes ocellatus var. tenuis Fern.-Brime & Llimona (2013); Diploschistes subocellatus (Nyl.) Zahlbr. (1924); Lagerheimina ocellata (Fr.) Kuntze (1891); Lecanora ocellata Nyl. (1853); Lecanora villarsii Ach. (1810); Lichen ocellatus Vill. (1789); Lichen opegraphus * ocellata Lam. (1813); Parmelia ocellata Fr. (1831); Parmelia villarsii (Ach.) Spreng. (1827); Placodium ocellatum (Fr.) Link (1833); Urceolaria ocellata DC. (1805); Urceolaria scruposa var. ocellata (Lam.) Schaer. (1826); Urceolaria subocellata Nyl. (1879); Urceolaria villarsii (Ach.) Boistel (1903)

Single-species lichen genus

Xalocoa is a single-species fungal genus in the family Graphidaceae. It contains the single species Xalocoa ocellata, a lichen. This bark-dwelling species forms thin grey-white crusts with unusually large, eye-like spots that can reach up to 4 millimetres across. It has a nearly worldwide distribution in areas with Mediterranean-type climates and was first scientifically described in 1831 based on specimens collected from France.

== Taxonomy ==
The genus Xalocoa was circumscribed in 2013 by the lichenologists Ekaphan Kraichak, Robert Lücking, and H. Thorsten Lumbsch. It contains Xalocoa ocellata, a corticolous (bark-dwelling), crustose lichen that was originally described by Elias Magnus Fries in 1831 (as Parmelia ocellata). The type specimen was collected from France.

Xalocoa belongs to the subfamily Graphidoidae, and tribe Thelotremateae in the Graphidaceae. The genus is characterized by its greyish-white thallus covered by an epinecral layer, large apothecioid ascomata with exposed discs and thick, entire thalline margins, as well as a thin, reduced, uncarbonised proper exciple that lacks lateral paraphyses. The genus features a non-inspersed hymenium, pale brown, non-amyloid ascospores, bacilliform conidia, and contains the norstictic acid chemosyndrome. The genus name Xalocoa originates from the Catalan term xaloc, which signifies the sirocco, a warm wind that comes from the Sahara and affects Mediterranean regions. The species epithet pays tribute to Xavier Llimona, a Catalan researcher known for his work on Mediterranean lichens and his contributions to the taxonomy of the genus Diploschistes.

== Description ==
Xalocoa ocellata forms a thin, grey-white crust (the thallus) that is covered by an epinecral layer – a delicate, often slightly powdery film of dead fungal cells that helps the surface shed water. Its reproductive bodies (apothecia) are unusually large for the family, reaching up to about 4 mm across. Each apothecium is lecanorine: the round, exposed disc sits in a thick rim of thallus-derived tissue (the thalline margin), so the fruiting bodies look like tiny greyish eye-spots set into the crust. Beneath the margin lies a very thin, uncarbonised proper exciple (the cup-shaped tissue that lines the disc), and the spore-bearing layer (hymenium) is clear rather than shot through with oil droplets (non-inspersed).

Microscopically, the asci produce eight pale-brown, multi-chambered (muriform) ascospores that lack any starch reaction (non-amyloid). The spores measure roughly 25–45 μm long and 10–15 μm wide and are divided by both transverse and longitudinal partitions (septa), giving them a brick-like appearance. Asexual reproduction is by slender, rod-shaped (bacilliform) conidia. Chemical spot tests detect norstictic acid, a secondary metabolite that often gives the medulla a yellow to red reaction with potassium hydroxide solution (the K test). Together, the large lecanorine apothecia, absence of lateral paraphyses, muriform spores and norstictic-acid chemistry distinguish Xalocoa from superficially similar genera in the family Graphidaceae.

== Habitat and distribution ==
Xalocoa ocellata has a nearly cosmopolitan distribution, occurring in areas with a Mediterranean climate. It has been recorded from Yunnan and Sichuan provinces in China.
