= Phaeographopsis =

Scientific classification
- Domain: Eukaryota
- Kingdom: Fungi
- Division: Ascomycota
- Class: Lecanoromycetes
- Order: Graphidales
- Family: Graphidaceae
- Genus: Phaeographopsis; Sipman (1997)

Type species
- Phaeographopsis indica (Patw. & Nagarkar) Sipman & Aptroot (2007)

Species
- P. indica P. neotropica P. palaeotropica

Genus of lichens

Phaeographopsis is a genus of script lichens in the family Graphidaceae. It has three species.

== Taxonomy ==
The genus was circumscribed by the Dutch lichenologist Harrie Sipman in 1997, with P. indica assigned as the type species; this species had originally been described as a member of Phaeographis. However, this species was not validly published because it did not provide a specific page number, but rather a range of pages (an interval) where the original description could be found. This general reference to a range of pages does not meet the precise requirements of the International Code of Nomenclature for algae, fungi, and plants. The name was published validly a decade later in 2007.

== Description ==
Genus Phaeographopsis is characterised by a crust-like form (crustose) that typically grows on the bark of trees (corticolous). Its growth is just beneath the outer bark layer of the tree (epiphloeodic). This positions Phaeographopsis closely to the genus Phaeographis, yet it can be distinguished by several key characteristics.

One of the primary differences lies in the structure of its ascospores, which are the reproductive spores produced in the asci. In Phaeographopsis, these ascospores lack an internal spore wall (endospore), which is a notable deviation from some related lichens. Additionally, the asci of Phaeographopsis are characterised by a thin dome at the apex, a distinct structural feature.

The paraphyses (sterile filaments among the asci) in this genus are branched at the tips (apically branched). Unlike many lichens, Phaeographopsis does not have a protective outer layer (cortex) on its thallus, which is the main vegetative body of the lichen. Furthermore, this genus produces pycnidia (tiny fruiting bodies that release asexual spores) atop small, rounded protrusions known as tubercules.

== Species ==
- Phaeographopsis indica (Patw. & Nagarkar) Sipman & Aptroot (2007) – India
- Phaeographopsis neotropica Kalb (2004) – Costa Rica
- Phaeographopsis palaeotropica Kalb & Frisch (2004) – Cameroon
