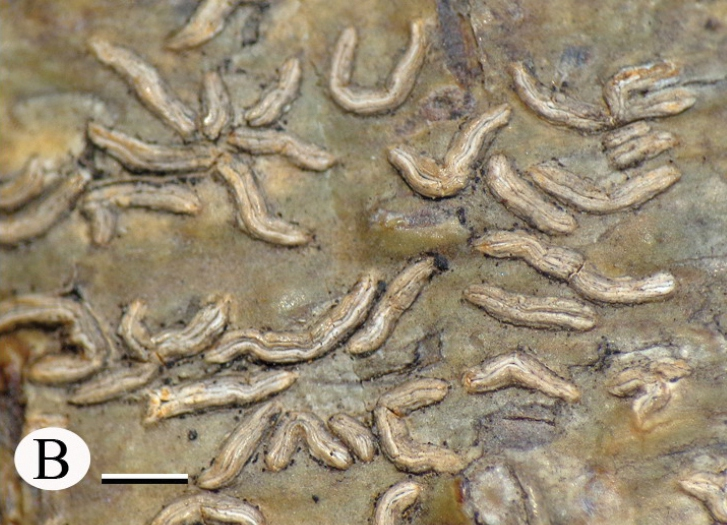
- P. fukiensis

Scientific classification
- Domain: Eukaryota
- Kingdom: Fungi
- Division: Ascomycota
- Class: Lecanoromycetes
- Order: Graphidales
- Family: Graphidaceae
- Genus: Phaeographina; Müll.Arg. (1882)

= Phaeographina =

Genus of lichen-forming fungi

Phaeographina is a genus of lichen-forming fungi in the family Graphidaceae. The genus was circumscribed by Swiss lichenologist Johannes Müller Argoviensis in 1882.

== Species ==
As of April 2023, Species Fungorum (in the Catalogue of Life) accepts 12 species of Phaeographina.

- Phaeographina albogranulifera M.Nakan., Kashiw. & K.H.Moon (2002) – Vanuatu
- Phaeographina caesiopruinosa (Fée) Müll.Arg. (1887)
- Phaeographina celata A.W.Archer (2004) – Solomon Islands
- Phaeographina contexta (Pers.) Müll.Arg. (1888)
- Phaeographina echinocarpica A.W. Archer & Elix (1999)
- Phaeographina exilior (Vain.) Zahlbr. (1923)
- Phaeographina fukienensis Zahlbr. (1930)
- Phaeographina megalospora A.W.Archer (2002) – Solomon Islands
- Phaeographina montiscalvi A.W.Archer (2001)
- Phaeographina subfarinacea (Nyl. ex Hue) Zahlbr. (1923)
- Phaeographina subintricata (Kremp.) Müll.Arg. ex Wolseley, M.B. Aguirre & P.M. McCarthy (2002)
- Phaeographina vanuatuensis M.Nakan., Kashiw. & K.H. Moon (2002) – Vanuatu
- Phaeographina wilsonii A.W.Archer (2001) – Australia
