= Diaphorographis =

Scientific classification
- Domain: Eukaryota
- Kingdom: Fungi
- Division: Ascomycota
- Class: Lecanoromycetes
- Order: Graphidales
- Family: Graphidaceae
- Genus: Diaphorographis; A.W.Archer & Kalb (2009)

Type species
- Diaphorographis queenslandica Kalb & A.W.Archer (2009)

Species
- D. neocaledonica D. queenslandica

Genus of lichens

Diaphorographis is a genus of lichen-forming fungi in the family Graphidaceae. It has two species. The genus was circumscribed in 2009 by lichenologists Alan W. Archer and Klaus Kalb, with D. queenslandica as the type species. The genus is distinguished from Graphis by the I− (iodine-negative) ascospores, and from Carbacanthographis) by the absence of periphysoids. Collectively, the genus is found in northern Queensland, New Caledonia, and the Solomon Islands. Although the genus was originally reported to not contain any lichen products, a later reexamination of the type species revealed the presence of protocetraric acid.

== Species ==
- Diaphorographis neocaledonica A.W.Archer & Kalb (2009)
- Diaphorographis queenslandica Kalb & A.W.Archer (2009)
