= Pseudoramonia =

Scientific classification
- Domain: Eukaryota
- Kingdom: Fungi
- Division: Ascomycota
- Class: Lecanoromycetes
- Order: Graphidales
- Family: Graphidaceae
- Genus: Pseudoramonia; Kantvilas & Vězda (2000)

Type species
- Pseudoramonia stipitata (Vězda & Hertel) Kantvilas & Vězda (2000)

Species
- P. isidiata P. psoromica P. richeae P. stipitata

Genus of lichen-forming fungi

Pseudoramonia is a genus of lichen-forming fungi in the family Graphidaceae. The genus was circumscribed by lichenologists Gintaras Kantvilas and Antonín Vězda in 2000, with the type species designated as Pseudoramonia stipitata.

== Species ==
As of March 2023, Species Fungorum (in the Catalogue of Life) accepts four species of Pseudoramonia.

- Pseudoramonia isidiata Aptroot (2014) – Solomon Islands
- Pseudoramonia psoromica Aptroot (2016) – Madagascar
- Pseudoramonia richeae Kantvilas & Vězda (2000) – Tasmania
- Pseudoramonia stipitata (Vězda & Hertel) Kantvilas & Vězda (2000)
