= Gintarasia =

Scientific classification
- Domain: Eukaryota
- Kingdom: Fungi
- Division: Ascomycota
- Class: Lecanoromycetes
- Order: Graphidales
- Family: Graphidaceae
- Genus: Gintarasia; Kraichak, Lücking & Lumbsch (2013)

Type species
- Gintarasia lamellifera (Kantvilas & Vězda) E.Kraichak, Lücking, Lumbsch (2013)

Species
- G. asteliae G. darlingtonii G. lamellifera G. lordhowensis G. megalophthalma G. minor G. tasmanica

Genus of lichens

Gintarasia is a genus of lichen-forming fungi in the family Graphidaceae. It has seven species, all of which are found in Australia. Gintarasia species are corticolous (bark-dwelling), crustose lichens with a thelotremoid form.

== Taxonomy ==
Gintarasia was formally proposed as a new genus in 2013 by Ekaphan Kraichak, Robert Lücking, and Helge Thorsten Lumbsch. Within the family Graphidaceae, it is classified in the subfamily Graphidoidae, and tribe Thelotremateae. The genus is named in honour of Gintaras Kantvilas, a Tasmanian lichenologist who has made significant contributions to the study of lichenology in Australia, particularly in Tasmania, including the taxonomy of Tasmanian thelotremoid Graphidaceae.

== Description ==
The genus is characterized by a greyish-green to olive-green thallus covered by a cortex or epinecral layer; large chroodiscoid ascomata with exposed discs and thick thalline margins; a fused, hyaline to yellowish proper exciple with lateral paraphyses; a non-inspersed hymenium; hyaline, non-amyloid or amyloid ascospores; and the presence of depsidones of the protocetraric or stictic acid chemosyndrome.

== Species ==
All species of Gintarasia occur in Australia.

- Gintarasia asteliae (Kantvilas & Vězda) Kantvilas (2020)
- Gintarasia darlingtonii (Frisch & Kalb) Lumbsch, Kraichak & Lücking (2014)
- Gintarasia lamellifera (Kantvilas & Vězda) Kraichak, Lücking, Lumbsch (2014)
- Gintarasia lordhowensis (Mangold) Kraichak, Lücking & Lumbsch (2014)
- Gintarasia megalophthalma (Müll.Arg.) Kraichak, Lücking & Lumbsch (2014)
- Gintarasia minor (Kantvilas & Vězda) Kantvilas (2020)
- Gintarasia tasmanica (Kantvilas & Vězda) Kantvilas (2020)

The taxon invalidly published as Gintarasia elixii (Frisch & Kalb) Lumbsch, Kraichak & Lücking (2014) is now known as Topeliopsis elixii.
