= Schizotrema =

Scientific classification
- Kingdom: Fungi
- Division: Ascomycota
- Class: Lecanoromycetes
- Order: Graphidales
- Family: Graphidaceae
- Genus: Schizotrema; Mangold & Lumbsch (2009)

Type species
- Schizotrema zebrinum Mangold (2009)

Species
- S. flavolucens S. guadeloupense S. quercicola S. schizolomum S. subzebrinum S. vezdanum S. zebrinum

Genus of lichen-forming fungi

Schizotrema is a genus of lichen-forming fungi in the family Graphidaceae. The genus was circumscribed in 2009 by Armin Mangold and H. Thorsten Lumbsch.

== Description ==
The genus Schizotrema consists of lichens with a thallus that can range from being immersed in the substrate to appearing more superficial. The thallus is usually pale in colour and often inconspicuous. Its photosynthetic partner, or photobiont, is a green alga from the genus Trentepohlia. The prothallus, a structure that sometimes surrounds the edges of the lichen, is faint and brown, blending subtly with the substrate. Some species produce soralia, which are small, discrete, and punctiform (dot-like) structures that release powdery reproductive propagules for asexual reproduction.

The ascomata, or sexual reproductive structures are generally rounded and embedded within the thallus. These structures are surrounded by a thick, layered thalline rim, which may flake away as the lichen ages. The true exciple, the tissue surrounding the spore-producing region, is dark brown to black and multilayered. It may or may not react with iodine at its base (amyloid or non-amyloid) and is lined with small hair-like structures known as periphysoids.

Internally, the hymenium (spore-producing region) is tightly packed and does not react to iodine staining (non-amyloid). The hamathecium, the network of sterile filaments within the hymenium, is composed of unbranched paraphyses with tips that are not thickened. The asci, which are sac-like structures where spores develop, are clavate (club-shaped) and contain between one and eight spores. These asci also do not react to iodine. The spores produced by Schizotrema are transversely septate (divided by cross-walls) or muriform (divided into multiple compartments by both transverse and longitudinal walls). They are hyaline (colourless) to yellowish, sometimes becoming brown at full maturity, and may have a thin gelatinous coating. Asexual reproductive structures called conidiomata have not been observed to occur in this genus. Secondary chemistry is variable: some species contain β-orcinol depsidones, while others appear to lack detectable lichen substances.

== Habitat and distribution ==
Species of Schizotrema grow on bark and sometimes wood, and the genus appears to be concentrated in Australia, especially in cool-temperate and warm-temperate rainforest, though some species also occur in subtropical and tropical habitats. In 2019, the genus was reported from China for the first time when S. guadeloupense was documented from Yunnan Province. That collection was also presented as the first record of the species in Asia. In China, it was found on bark in tropical forest at about 1,280 m elevation, where it occurred together with species of Graphis.

== Species ==
- Schizotrema flavolucens (Sipman) Lücking (2016)
- Schizotrema guadeloupense (Hale) Mangold & Lumbsch (2009)
- Schizotrema quercicola (Coppins & P.James) Ertz, Frisch & Sanderson (2019)
- Schizotrema schizolomum (Müll.Arg.) Mangold & Lumbsch (2009)
- Schizotrema subzebrinum Mangold (2009) – New South Wales
- Schizotrema vezdanum Kantvilas (2020) – Tasmania
- Schizotrema zebrinum Mangold (2009) – New South Wales

The species once known as Schizotrema cryptotrema (Nyl.) Rivas Plata & Mangold (2010) is now Cryptoschizotrema cryptotrema.
