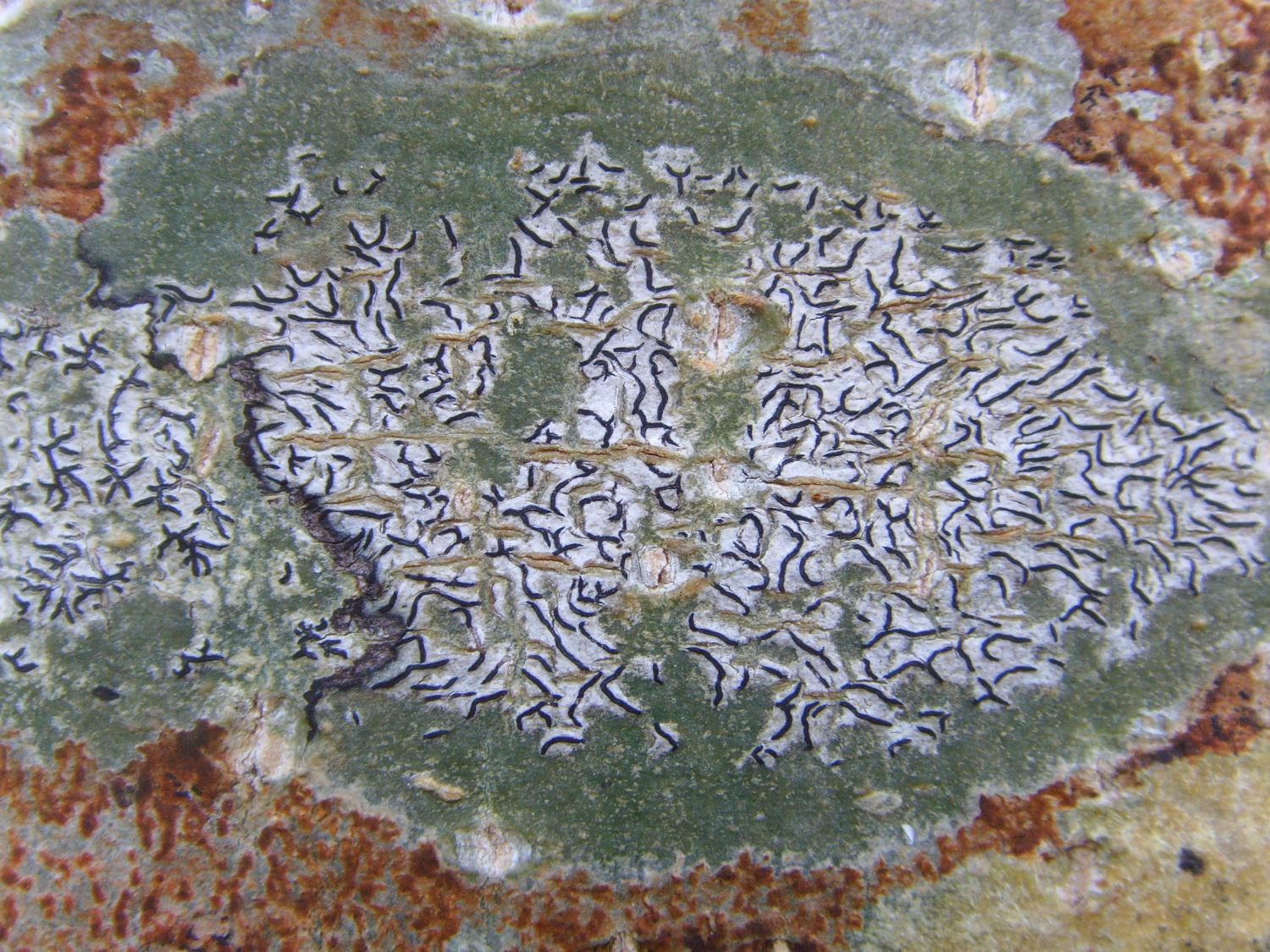
- Graphina anguina in France

Scientific classification
- Domain: Eukaryota
- Kingdom: Fungi
- Division: Ascomycota
- Class: Lecanoromycetes
- Order: Graphidales
- Family: Graphidaceae
- Genus: Graphina; Müll.Arg. (1880)

Type species
- Graphina anguina (Mont.) Müll.Arg. (1882)

Species
- See text

Synonyms
- Glaucinaria Fée ex A.Massal. (1860); Graphinomyces Cif. & Tomas. (1953); Leucogramma G.Mey. (1825); Leucogramma A.Massal. (1860); Solenographa A.Massal. (1860); Stenographa Mudd (1861); Thalloloma Trevis. (1853)

= Graphina =

Genus of lichens

Graphina is a genus of script lichens in the family Graphidaceae. It has about 25 species. The genus was circumscribed in 1880 by Swiss lichenologist Johannes Müller Argoviensis. Müller Argoviensis did not indicate a type species for the genus in his original publication; David Hawksworth proposed to designate Graphina anguina as a lectotype in 1981.

== Species ==
- Graphina anguina (Mont.) Müll.Arg. (1882)
- Graphina austenensis A.W.Archer (2002)
- Graphina castanocarpa A.W.Archer (2003)
- Graphina colliculosa (Mont.) Hale (1976)
- Graphina conferta A.W.Archer (2003)
- Graphina dimidiata (Vain.) Zahlbr. (1923)
- Graphina fissofurcata (Leight.) Müll.Arg. (1882)
- Graphina glaucoderma (Nyl.) Müll.Arg. (1895)
- Graphina gracilescens (Vain.) Zahlbr. (1923)
- Graphina hiascens (Fée) Müll.Arg. (1887)
- Graphina insignis (Vain.) Zahlbr. (1923)
- Graphina laevigata (Müll. Arg.) A.W.Archer (1999)
- Graphina marcescens (Fée) Müll.Arg. (1887)
- Graphina palmicola Müll.Arg. (1887)
- Graphina pauciloculata Coppins & P.James (1978)
- Graphina platycarpa (Eschw.) Zahlbr. (1902)
- Graphina polyclades (Kremp.) Müll.Arg. (1882)
- Graphina repleta (Stirt.) Shirley (1889)
- Graphina rubens Müll.Arg. (1882)
- Graphina sophistica (Nyl.) Müll.Arg. (1880)
- Graphina streblocarpa (Bél.) Müll.Arg. (1882)
- Graphina subserpentina (Nyl.) Müll.Arg. (1894)
- Graphina subtartarea Müll.Arg. (1887)
- Graphina subvestita (Vain.) Aptroot (2002)
