= Topeliopsis =

Scientific classification
- Kingdom: Fungi
- Division: Ascomycota
- Class: Lecanoromycetes
- Order: Graphidales
- Family: Graphidaceae
- Genus: Topeliopsis; Kantvilas & Vězda (2000)

Type species
- Topeliopsis muscicola Kantvilas & Vězda (2000)

Genus of lichen-forming fungi

Topeliopsis is a genus of lichen-forming fungi in the family Graphidaceae.

== Taxonomy ==
The genus Topeliopsis was established in 2000 by the lichenologists Gintaras Kantvilas and Antonín Vězda as part of their studies on the lichen family Thelotremataceae in Tasmania. The genus name, which contains the Greek "-opsis", alludes to its superficial resemblance to the lichen genus Topelia.

Topeliopsis was created to accommodate those members of Thelotremataceae that possess certain distinctive characteristics:

- sessile or somewhat immersed apothecia (the disc-shaped reproductive structures)
- perithecioid growth form (flask-shaped structures that open by a small pore)
- cupular excipulum (a cup-like structure surrounding the reproductive tissue)
- deeply urceolate disc (a deeply concave, pitcher-shaped reproductive surface)
- markedly thickened young asci (the sac-like structures containing spores)
- large, thin-walled, muriform ascospores that turn reddish in iodine

The genus is closely related to both Chroodiscus and Pseudoramonia, but differs from Chroodiscus by having a concave disc rather than a plane one, and by possessing a cupular (cup-shaped) rather than ring-like excipulum. While Pseudoramonia shares the perithecioid apothecia with a cupular excipulum, it differs by having stipitate (stalked) apothecia and transversely septate spores that do not react with iodine.

When first circumscribed, Topeliopsis included three species:

- T. muscicola (the type species) – endemic to Tasmania and New Zealand
- T. rugosa – endemic to Tasmania
- T. toensbargii – found in the Pacific Northwest of North America

== Species ==
- Topeliopsis acutispora Kalb (2001) – Australia
- Topeliopsis athallina Lumbsch & Mangold (2010)
- Topeliopsis azorica (P.James & Purvis) Coppins & Aptroot (2008)
- Topeliopsis corticola Kalb (2001) – Australia
- Topeliopsis decorticans (Müll.Arg.) Frisch & Kalb (2006)
- Topeliopsis elixii Frisch & Kalb (2006)
- Topeliopsis fatiscens Kantvilas (2020)
- Topeliopsis guaiquinimae (Sipman) Rivas Plata & Mangold (2010)
- Topeliopsis juniperina van den Boom & Sipman (2023)
- Topeliopsis kantvilasii Mangold & Lumbsch (2009)
- Topeliopsis lomatiae (Messuti, Lumbsch & Vězda) Messuti & Mangold (2010)
- Topeliopsis macrocarpa (C.W.Dodge) Mangold (2009)
- Topeliopsis monospora (Aptroot) Rivas Plata & Lücking (2010)
- Topeliopsis muscigena (Stizenb.) Kalb (2001) – Australia
- Topeliopsis novae-zelandiae (Szatala) Lumbsch & Mangold (2010)
- Topeliopsis patagonica Mangold & Lumbsch (2010)
- Topeliopsis subdenticulata (Zahlbr.) Frisch & Kalb (2006)
- Topeliopsis subtuberculifera Weerakoon, Jayalal & Lücking (2015)
- Topeliopsis tuberculifera (Vain.) Rivas Plata & Mangold (2010)
- Topeliopsis vezdae Kalb (2001) – Australia
