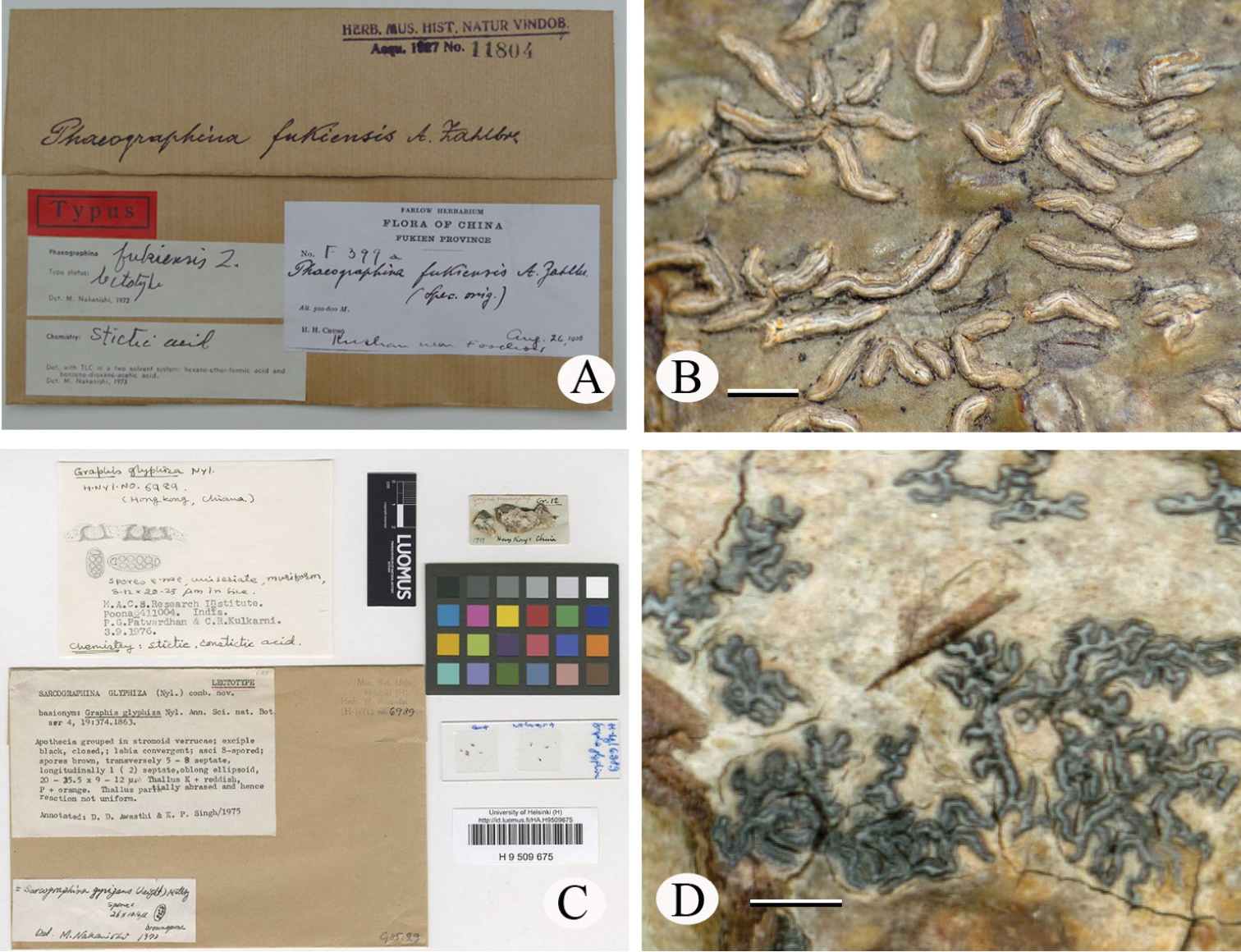
- A–B Pallidogramme chrysenteron, formerly Phaeographina fukiensis. C–D Sarcographa glyphiza, formerly Graphis glyphiza. Scale bars = 1 mm

Scientific classification
- Kingdom: Fungi
- Division: Ascomycota
- Class: Lecanoromycetes
- Order: Graphidales; Hazlinszky, F.A. (1884)

Families
- Diploschistaceae; Fissurinaceae; Gomphillaceae; Graphidaceae; Redonographaceae; Thelotremataceae

= Graphidales =

Order of lichen-forming fungi

Graphidales is an order of lichen-forming fungi in the class Lecanoromycetes. It contains 6 families, about 81 genera and about 2,228 species. Family Graphidaceae are the largest crustose family within Graphidales order comprising more than 2000 species, which are widely distributed in tropical and subtropical regions of the world.

== History ==
The Graphidales were introduced in a 1884 publication by Frigyes Ákos Hazslinszky in Magyar Birodalom Zuzmó-Flórája on page 216 as family Graphideae. In 1907, they were established as an order by American botanist Bessey (1845–1915),

When the order was introduced, it contained just two families, the Graphidaceae and Thelotremataceae who were both mainly tropical based and each family had about 800–1000 species.

Sherwood in 1977 proposed to maintain a distinction between the Graphidales with mostly lichenised members and the Ostropales which included mostly non-lichenised fungi, based on different spore septation types.

Molecular data by Winka et al. in 1998, supported a close relationship between the two groups of species.

The Graphidales were then included in the Ostropales order (Lecanoromycetes) for a long time (Staiger 2002; Kalb et al. 2004; Hibbett et al. 2007; Lumbsch et al. 2007; Kirk et al. 2008; Baloch et al. 2010; Rivas Plata and Lumbsch 2011; Rivas Plata et al. 2012; Lumbsch et al. 2014; Lücking et al. 2017; Wijayawardene et al. 2018).

In 2004, the phylogenetic relationships of class Lecanoromycetes were examined by using mitochondrial small subunit ribosomal DNA sequencing which found that orders Graphidales and Ostropales were monophyletic.

Using molecular data (partial DNA sequencing) in 2012, it was also shown that Graphidaceae and Thelotremataceae were non-monophyletic and consequently Thelotremataceae was included in Graphidaceae as a synonym. Graphidaceae also included subfamilies Fissurinoideae and Graphidoideae.

However, Kraichak et al. in 2018, ranked Graphidales as a separate order based on a temporal approach, and accepted five families; Diploschistaceae, Fissurinaceae, Gomphillaceae, Graphidaceae and Thelotremataceae. Wijayawardene et al. 2020 agreed but also added family Redonographaceae to the order, Other authors have agreed on the use of reinstated order of Graphidales.

== Description ==
Most species in the order are lichens which have a thallus (vegetative tissue) which is crustose and ascocarps (fruiting body) which are apothecioid (cup-shaped).

The Graphidaceae are mostly epiphytic lichens with trentepohlioid photobiont (i.e., filamentous, multicellular green algae from genus Trentepohlia), and graphidoid, distoseptate (forming a layer) ascospores.

Family Gomphillaceae was originally based on a single species, Gomphillus calycioides (Watson, 1929), which is an unusual taxon growing over bryophytes.

It includes a common asexual fungus Lawreya glyphidiphila (Teratosphaeriaceae family) which is described as growing on lichenized fungi Glyphis scyphulifera (Graphidaceae family).

== Distribution ==
They are mainly found in warmer regions living on bark. Genera in the order of Graphidales has been found worldwide, from North America (including Florida,), South America (including Venezuela, Costa Rica, and Guianas,), Africa (including Kenya, and South Africa,), Asia (including China, Vietnam, Sri Lanka, India, and Thailand,) Australia, and also New Zealand.

Species of family Gomphillaceae are found in north-eastern Brazil, Mexico, Guatemala, Costa Rica, Panama and Cuba.

== Families and genera ==
This is a list of the families and genera contained within the Graphidales, based on a 2020 review and summary of ascomycete classification. Following the taxon name is the taxonomic authority, year of publication, and (for genera) the number or estimated number of species:

=== Diploschistaceae Zahlbr (1905) ===
- Acanthothecis Clem. (ca. 60)
- Acanthotrema Frisch (6)
- Aggregatorygma M. Cáceres, Aptroot & Lücking (2)
- Ampliotrema Kalb ex Kalb (17)
- Asteristion Leight. (7)
- Austrotrema I. Medeiros, Lücking & Lumbsch (3)
- Borinquenotrema Merc.-Díaz, Lücking & Parnmen (1)
- Byssotrema M. Cáceres (1)
- Carbacanthographis Staiger & Kalb (28)
- Compositrema Rivas Plata, Lücking & Lumbsch (4)
- Corticorygma M. Cáceres, S.C. Feuerst., Aptroot & Lücking (1)
- Diploschistes Norman (33)
- Fibrillithecis A. Frisch (15)
- Gintarasia Kraichak, Lücking & Lumbsch (8)
- Glaucotrema Rivas Plata & Lumbsch (5)
- Gyrotrema A. Frisch (6)
- Heiomasia Nelsen, Lücking & Rivas Plata (5)
- Melanotopelia Lumbsch & Mangold (4)
- Melanotrema A. Frisch (12)
- Myriochapsa M. Cáceres, Lücking & Lumbsch (3)
- Myriotrema Fée (55)
- Nadvornikia Tibell (5)
- Nitidochapsa Parnmen, Lücking & Lumbsch (5)
- Ocellularia G. Mey. (ca. 400)
- Phaeographopsis Sipman (3)
- Pseudoramonia Kantvilas & Vězda (4)
- Redingeria A. Frisch (9)
- Reimnitzia Kalb (1)
- Rhabdodiscus Vain. (36)
- Sanguinotrema Lücking (1)
- Schizotrema Mangold & Lumbsch (8)
- Stegobolus Mont. (16)
- Topeliopsis Kantvilas & Vězda (20)
- Wirthiotrema Rivas Plata, Kalb, Frisch & Lumbsch (5)
- Xalocoa Kraichak, Lücking & Lumbsch (1)

=== Fissurinaceae (Rivas Plata, Lücking & Lumbsch) B.P. Hodk. (2012) ===
- Clandestinotrema Rivas Plata, Lücking & Lumbsch (17)
- Cruentotrema Rivas Plata, Papong, Lumbsch & Lücking (7)
- Dyplolabia A. Massal. (5)
- Enigmotrema Lücking (1)
- Fissurina Fée (ca. 155)
- Pycnotrema Rivas Plata & Lücking (2)

=== Gomphillaceae Walt. Watson (1984) ===
- Actinoplaca Müll. Arg. (2)
- Aderkomyces Bat. (30)
- Aplanocalenia Lücking, Sérus. & Vězda (1)
- Arthotheliopsis Vain. (5)
- Asterothyrium Müll. Arg. (32)
- Aulaxina Fée (14)
- Calenia Müll. Arg. (30)
- Caleniopsis Vězda & Poelt (2)
- Cladosterigma (Speg.) Höhn. (1920) (1)
- Corticifraga D. Hawksw. & R. Sant. (9)
- Diploschistella Vain. (4)
- Echinoplaca Fée (40)
- Ferraroa Lücking, Sérus. & Vězda (1)
- Gomphillus Nyl. (6)
- Gyalectidium Müll. Arg. (52)
- Gyalidea Lettau (50)
- Gyalideopsis Vězda (91)
- Hippocrepidea Sérus. (1)
- Jamesiella Lücking, Sérus. & Vězda (4)
- Lithogyalideopsis Lücking, Sérus. & Vězda (4)
- Paragyalideopsis Etayo (4)
- Paratricharia Lücking (1)
- Phyllogyalidea Lücking & Aptroot (2)
- Psorotheciopsis Rehm (7)
- Rolueckia Papong, Thammath. & Boonpr. (3)
- Taitaia Suija, Kaasalainen, Kirika & Rikkinen (1)
- Tricharia Fée (ca. 30)

=== Graphidaceae Dumort. (1822) ===
- Allographa Chevall. (ca. 185)
- Anomalographis Kalb (2)
- Anomomorpha Nyl. ex Hue (8)
- Creographa A. Massal. (2)
- Cryptoschizotrema Aptroot et al (2)
- Diaphorographis A.W. Archer & Kalb (2)
- Diorygma Eschw. (77)
- Flegographa A. Massal. (1)
- Glyphis Ach. (7)
- Graphis Adans. (ca. 275)
- Halegrapha Rivas Plata & Lücking (9)
- Hemithecium Trevis. (ca. 50)
- Jocatoa R. Miranda (1)
- Kalbographa Lücking (5)
- Leiorreuma Eschw. (18)
- Malmographina M. Cáceres, Rivas Plata & Lücking (1)
- Mangoldia Lücking, Parnmen & Lumbsch (2)
- Pallidogramme Staiger, Kalb & Lücking (14)
- Phaeographis Müll. Arg. (ca. 180)
- Platygramme Fée (30)
- Platythecium Staiger (27)
- Pliariona A. Massal. (1)
- Polistroma Clemente (1)
- Pseudochapsa Parnmen, Lücking & Lumbsch (19)
- Pseudotopeliopsis Parnmen, Lücking & Lumbsch (4)
- Sarcographa Fée (37)
- Sarcographina Müll. Arg. (6)
- Schistophoron Stirt. (5)
- Thalloloma Trevis. (20)
- Thecaria Fée (4)
- Thecographa A. Massal. (3)

=== Redonographaceae (Lücking, Tehler & Lumbsch) Lumbsch (2020) ===
- Gymnographopsis C.W. Dodge (3)
- Redonographa Lücking, Tehler & Lumbsch (5)

=== Thelotremataceae Stizenb. (1862) ===
- Astrochapsa Parnmen, Lücking & Lumbsch (29)
- Chapsa A. Massal. (ca. 60)
- Chroodiscus (Müll. Arg.) Müll. Arg. (17)
- Crutarndina Parnmen, Lücking & Lumbsch (1)
- Leucodecton A. Massal. (31)
- Paratopeliopsis Merc.-Díaz, Lücking & Parnmen (1)
- Thelotrema Ach. (includes Tremotylium Nyl.) (165)
