= Allographa upduna =

Scientific classification
- Kingdom: Fungi
- Division: Ascomycota
- Class: Lecanoromycetes
- Order: Graphidales
- Family: Graphidaceae
- Genus: Allographa
- Species: A. upduna

Binomial name
- Allographa upduna Lücking & Kalb (2018)

Synonyms
- Hemithecium isidiatum Upreti & U.Dubey (2011)

Species of lichen-forming fungus

Allographa upduna is a species of bark-dwelling script lichen in the family Graphidaceae. It forms a smooth, greenish-grey to grey crust and produces isidia, small coral-like outgrowths used for asexual reproduction. The fruiting bodies are elongated and slit-like, typical of script lichens. The species grows in the semi-evergreen forests of Arunachal Pradesh in northeastern India.

== Taxonomy ==
Allographa upduna was originally described as Hemithecium isidiatum by Dalip Kumar Upreti and Urvashi Dubey in a 2011 paper co-authored with Sanjeeva Nayaka. The holotype was collected on bark in Kago-kashi forest near Kabu village (West Siang District, Arunachal Pradesh) on 20 March 2006 and is housed in the herbarium of the National Botanical Research Institute in Lucknow (LWG). In the original publication, the species was classified in Hemithecium, which contained 44 species worldwide at that time. Described as the first known isidiate member of Hemithecium, it was also characterized by its hyaline (colourless), muriform (multi-chambered) ascospores and the presence of salazinic acid. The epithet isidiatum refers to the isidia on the thallus.

Robert Lücking and Klaus Kalb later introduced the replacement name Allographa upduna for Hemithecium isidiatum. The original epithet could not be used in Allographa because it would conflict with the already-published name Allographa isidiata. The name upduna is formed from the initials of the authors of the original description (Upreti, Dubey, and Nayaka).

== Description ==
Allographa upduna is a crustose lichen that forms a smooth, thick crust that is greenish grey to grey, sometimes becoming greyish-brown to pale brown. The thallus produces isidia (small outgrowths used for vegetative reproduction) that are simple to coralloid-branched, about 0.2–0.4 mm in diameter and 0.3–1.0 mm tall, and the same colour as the thallus and readily detached.

The fruiting bodies are lirellae (elongate, slit-like apothecia) that are greyish white to grey, prominent and emergent, mostly simple, and typically 1–4 mm long and 0.25–0.5 mm wide. Their rim (the exciple) is non-carbonized and colourless to pale yellowish-brown; it has a narrow basal region and a broader upper region marked by several grooves (striae). The labia are convergent and entire, irregular on the outer side, and covered by a thalline veil up to the top; crystals also occur above the exciple. The epihymenium is dark brown and 6–9 μm high, while the hymenium is hyaline, not inspersed, and 80–120 μm high; beneath it is a pale yellow to yellow hypothecium about 14–18 μm high. The asci contain 4–8 spores and measure about 45–77 μm long and 13–20 μm wide. The ascospores are hyaline, oblong-ellipsoid and muriform, with 6–17 transverse septa and 1–5 longitudinal septa, measuring 14–27(–35) × 6–8 μm, and they show an iodine staining reaction described as I+ blue. Thin-layer chromatography detected salazinic acid in the thallus.

=== Similar species ===
Allographa upduna may be confused with Platythecium dimorphodes because of the lirellae morphology and the presence of isidia, but that species has smaller spores (9–16 × 5–8 μm) and contains norstictic and connorstictic acids. It is close to Hemithecium microspermum in ascospore size and shape, but that species differs in having a non-striate or weakly striate exciple and different lichen substances (constictic, hyposalazinic, norstictic and stictic acids). Hemithecium salacilabiatum also contains salazinic acid but lacks isidia and has much larger spores (130–200 × 35–60 μm).

== Habitat and distribution ==
Allographa upduna has been reported from semi-evergreen forests in the West Siang District of Arunachal Pradesh in the eastern Himalayan region of India. The species was recorded between 250 and 500 m elevation. It grows mostly on smooth-barked trees in moist, humid sites. In the type area it was found growing with other lichens including Graphis scripta, Sarcographa labyrinthica, Phaeographis dendritica, and various pyrenocarpous lichens.

== See also ==
- List of Allographa species
