= Allographa cerradensis =

Scientific classification
- Kingdom: Fungi
- Division: Ascomycota
- Class: Lecanoromycetes
- Order: Graphidales
- Family: Graphidaceae
- Genus: Allographa
- Species: A. cerradensis

Binomial name
- Allographa cerradensis (Marcelli, Benatti & Lücking) Lücking & Kalb (2018)

Synonyms
- Graphis cerradensis Marcelli, Benatti & Lücking (2011)

Species of lichen-forming fungus

Allographa cerradensis is a species of lichen-forming fungus in the family Graphidaceae. Found in Brazil, it was described as new to science in 2011 as Graphis cerradensis but in 2018 it was transferred to its current genus, Allographa. This bark-dwelling lichen forms thin, pale greenish-grey crusts with distinctive elongated fruiting bodies that snake across the surface in wavy lines. It is known only from its original discovery location in a Brazilian savanna reserve, where it grows in humid patches of dense Cerrado vegetation.

== Taxonomy ==
Graphis cerradensis was described as new to science in 2011 by Marcelo Marcelli, Michel Benatti, and Robert Lücking on the basis of material collected in November 2007 from the Mogi-Guaçu Biological Reserve in São Paulo State, Brazil. The specific epithet refers to the Cerrado biome—the seasonally dry yet humid savanna–woodland mosaic—where the holotype was found.

The species was subsequently transferred by Lücking and Klaus Kalb to the genus Allographa in 2018 as part of a major reorganization of the script lichen genera Graphis and Hemithecium. This transfer resulted in the current accepted name Allographa cerradensis.

The authors originally assigned Graphis cerradensis to the Graphis cinerea species group (now placed in Allographa), a set of robust bark-dwelling (corticolous) lichens characterised by prominent, often grooved lirellae (elongate fruiting bodies), a heavily blackened (carbonised) excipulum, and a hymenium suffused with tiny oil droplets (an inspersion). Within that group A. cerradensis is unique in combining a stictic acid chemistry with large, brick-walled (muriform) ascospores; its closest look-alike, A. insperso-stictica (formerly G. insperso-stictica), has narrower lirellae and spores divided only by cross-walls.

== Description ==
The lichen forms a thin, continuous thallus (lichen body) up to 5 cm across and 30–70 micrometres (μm) thick. Its surface is smooth to slightly uneven, matt, and pale greenish-grey, lacking any dark boundary line (prothallus). In vertical section the upper cortex is cartilaginous, the internal algal layer irregular, and large clusters of crystals are scattered throughout—features that impart a faint speckled appearance.

Reproductive structures are elongate lirellae, 1–3 mm long and 0.5–0.6 mm wide, that snake flexuously across the thallus. Each lirella is rimmed by a thick, white extension of the thallus that completely covers the dark inner lips (labia). Beneath this margin lies a fully carbonised excipulum, 70–150 μm wide, whose jagged crest is just visible in transmitted light. The hymenium (the fertile tissue) is 150–200 μm tall and densely infilled with minute granules that dissolve quickly in potassium hydroxide solution, clearing the view of the slender paraphyses and spore-bearing asci. Asci are spindle- to club-shaped, 130–180 × 30–40 μm, and usually contain four to eight ascospores. The colourless ascospores are oblong, 80–100 × 15–20 μm, and divided by 15–25 cross-walls (septa) and one to three longitudinal walls per segment, giving a brick-like (muriform) pattern; they are roughly six to seven times longer than wide. Thin-layer chromatography detects stictic acid as the sole secondary metabolite.

The South African species Allographa oldayana is similar in appearance to A. cerradensis, but can be distinguished by its clearer hymenium, larger ascospores, and the presence of the compound hirtifructic acid.

== Habitat and distribution ==
Allographa cerradensis is known only from the type collection made on tree bark in a patch of dense, moisture-laden Cerrado vegetation at about 600 m elevation within the Mogi-Guaçu Biological Reserve, southern Brazil. The Cerrado is a fire-prone savanna biome, yet in gallery forest and seasonally flooded depressions it can support humid microhabitats suitable for shade-tolerant lichens. No additional localities have been reported, so the full geographic range and ecological amplitude of the species remain unclear.

== See also ==
- List of Allographa species
