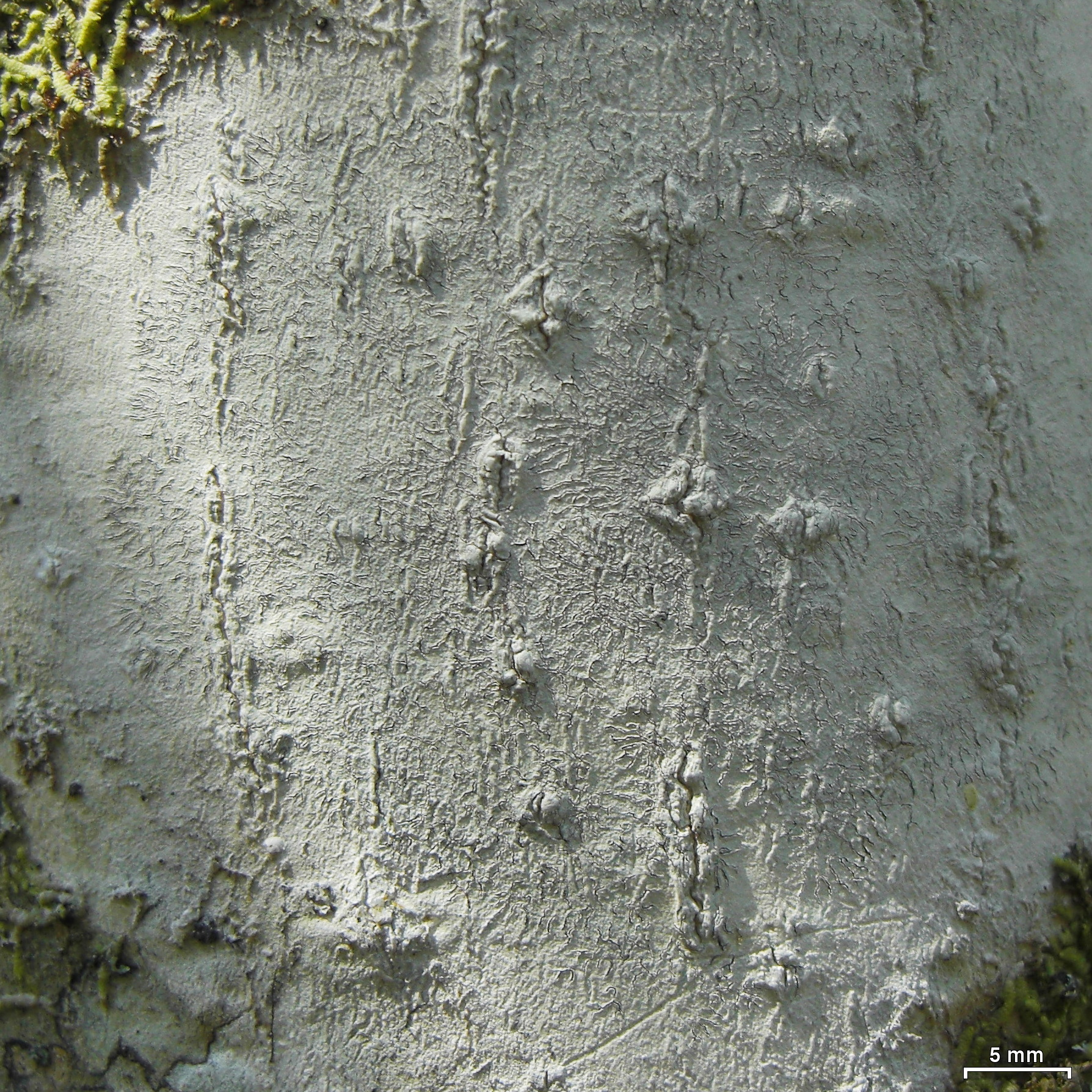
- Growing on American holly, in Alligator River National Wildlife Refuge, USA

Scientific classification
- Domain: Eukaryota
- Kingdom: Fungi
- Division: Ascomycota
- Class: Lecanoromycetes
- Order: Graphidales
- Family: Graphidaceae
- Genus: Platythecium
- Species: P. hypoleptum

Binomial name
- Platythecium hypoleptum (Nyl.) M.Nakan. & Kashiw. (2003)

Synonyms
- Graphis hypolepta Nyl. (1863); Thalloloma hypoleptum (Nyl.) Staiger (2002)

= Platythecium hypoleptum =

Species of lichen

Platythecium hypoleptum is a species of corticolous (bark-dwelling), crustose lichen in the family Graphidaceae.

== Taxonomy ==
The lichen was first formally described as a species new to science in 1863 by Finnish botanist William Nylander, as a member of the genus Graphis. The type specimen was collected in Nova Granada (Brazil), at an altitude of 2,400 m (7,900 ft). Nylander noted some similarity with Graphis homographiza, and also compared it to Graphis dividens (now Phaeographis dividens). In 2002, Bettina Staiger proposed a transfer to genus Thalloloma, based on a reorganisation of family Graphidaceae that stressed the importance of ascocarps and their accessory organs as characteristics to delimit genera. A year later, Minoru Nakanishi and Hiroyuki Kashiwadani suggested that the taxon should instead be in genus Platythecium.
