= Allographa guainiae =

Scientific classification
- Kingdom: Fungi
- Division: Ascomycota
- Class: Lecanoromycetes
- Order: Graphidales
- Family: Graphidaceae
- Genus: Allographa
- Species: A. guainiae

Binomial name
- Allographa guainiae Lücking, N.Marín & B.Moncada (2023)
- Type locality: Inírida, Guainía, Colombia

Species of lichen-forming fungus

Allographa guainiae is a species of crustose lichen-forming fungus in the family Graphidaceae. It is a green-gray, bark-dwelling lichen with prominent, straight, slit-like fruiting bodies with distinctively grooved black lips. The species was described in 2023 and is known only from palm-dominated forest in Guainía, Colombia.

== Taxonomy ==
Allographa guainiae was described as a new species in 2023 by Robert Lücking, Norida Lucia Marín-Canchala, and Bibiana Moncada, based on material collected in Colombia (Guainía Department).

== Description ==
The body (thallus) is a crust growing on bark, up to 7 cm across and about 100–150(–200) μm thick. Its surface is coarsely uneven to irregularly warty (verrucose), green-gray, and dull; no visible border zone (prothallus) is present, though a thin, irregular black line may appear where the thallus meets neighboring lichens. In cross-section, the thallus has a distinct, firm outer skin (cortex, 15–25 μm), a relatively thick algal layer (30–70 μm), and a thick inner tissue (medulla, 50–100 μm); crystals are present in both the algal layer and medulla, including clusters of calcium oxalate. The algal partner (photobiont) is from the green algal genus Trentepohlia.

The fruiting bodies are slit-like structures (lirellae) that are straight, unbranched, and prominently raised to sitting directly on the thallus surface (sessile), with a thallus-derived rim along the sides (lateral thalline margin). They are typically 1–3 (sometimes up to 5) mm long and 0.4–0.7 mm wide, with the inner disc hidden from view. The lips (labia) are black and distinctly grooved (striate), with whitish thallus remnants along the grooves; the outer wall (excipulum) is completely blackened (carbonized). The spore-bearing layer (hymenium) is 130–150 μm high and only very sparsely and finely permeated with oil droplets (inspersed). The asci are spindle-shaped (fusiform, 120–130 × 12–15 μm), each containing eight ascospores. The ascospores are oblong, divided into 8–10 cells (7–9-septate), 25–30 × 6–7 μm, and stain violet-blue with iodine. Stictic acid was reported as the secondary metabolite.

== Habitat and distribution ==
The species is known to occur only in its type locality in the municipality of Inirida, Guainia Department, Colombia, where it was found at 215 m (705 ft) elevation growing on bark in a palm-dominated forest with abundant chiqui-chiqui palm (Leopoldinia piassaba).

== See also ==
- List of Allographa species
