= Allographa pruinodisca =

Scientific classification
- Kingdom: Fungi
- Division: Ascomycota
- Class: Lecanoromycetes
- Order: Graphidales
- Family: Graphidaceae
- Genus: Allographa
- Species: A. pruinodisca

Binomial name
- Allographa pruinodisca Aptroot (2022)

Species of lichen-forming fungus

Allographa pruinodisca is a species of corticolous (bark-dwelling) crustose lichen in the family Graphidaceae. It occurs in Brazil.

== Taxonomy ==
Allographa pruinodisca was formally described by the Dutch lichenologist André Aptroot. It was identified as a new species as part of a significant biodiversity assessment in a compact region of the Amazon rainforest. The species name, pruinodisca, is derived from the Latin words for "frosty" or "pruinose" (pruinosus) and "disc" (discus), referring to the distinctive pruinose (frosty-appearing) disc of its lirellae (long, slit-like reproductive structures).

== Description ==
The thallus of Allographa pruinodisca is crustose, continuous, and adheres closely to the surface of the tree bark. It has a dull, dirty pinkish-white appearance, extending up to 7 cm (2.8 in) in diameter and reaching a thickness of up to 0.1 mm. The photobiont, or photosynthetic partner, is trentepohlioid, a type of green algae.

The species is recognised for its "striatula-morph" lirellae (fruiting bodies), which are linear yet wavy and often branched. These reproductive structures are up to 4 mm long and about 0.4–0.5 mm wide, with a nearly closed, thinly white pruinose disc. The excipulum (the outer layer surrounding the ascoma) is fully carbonised.

Ascospores are hyaline (transparent), with 17–21 septa, measuring 80–90 by 9–12 μm, and arranged four per ascus. They are notable for their violet reaction to iodine (IKI+). Chemical analysis reveals no secondary metabolites in the thallus, which does not react to standard lichen spot tests (UV, C, K, KC, and P).

== Habitat and distribution ==
Endemic to the primary rainforests of Mato Grosso, Brazil, Allographa pruinodisca inhabits tree bark.

== See also ==
- List of Allographa species
