= Allographa chamelensis =

Scientific classification
- Kingdom: Fungi
- Division: Ascomycota
- Class: Lecanoromycetes
- Order: Graphidales
- Family: Graphidaceae
- Genus: Allographa
- Species: A. chamelensis

Binomial name
- Allographa chamelensis (A.B.Peña & Lücking) Lücking & Kalb (2018)
- Type locality: Chamela-Cuixmala Biosphere Reserve, Mexico

Synonyms
- Graphis chamelensis A.B.Peña & Lücking (2014)

Species of lichen-forming fungus

Allographa chamelensis is a species of script lichen in the family Graphidaceae. Originally described in 2014 as Graphis chamelensis from the Chamela-Cuixmala Biosphere Reserve in Jalisco, Mexico, this bark-dwelling lichen forms a pale greenish-grey crust in seasonally tropical dry forests. The species is characterised by its prominent, often partly branched, slit-like fruiting bodies (lirellae) with black lips, ascospores divided by 7–10 cross-walls, and the presence of norstictic acid.

== Taxonomy ==
Allographa chamelensis was described as new to science in 2014 by the lichenologists Alejandrina Bárcenas-Peña and Robert Lücking. The holotype was collected in the Chamela-Cuixmala Biosphere Reserve at the Chamela Biological Station (Jalisco, Mexico), near the Hornitos stream, in a transition between seasonally tropical dry forest and semideciduous arroyo forest, growing on bark. Lücking and Klaus Kalb reclassified the taxon in the segregate genus Allographa in 2018.

In the original diagnosis, the species was distinguished from the similar Graphis emersa by its longer, partly branched lirellae, and from G. conferta by its norstictic acid chemistry. In the accompanying remarks it is compared again with G. emersa (sharing the same chemistry, but differing in the longer, partly branched, prominent lirellae with a sometimes basally developed thalline margin), and with G. conferta (which has sessile lirellae lacking a thalline margin, slightly longer ascospores, and no secondary metabolites).

== Description ==
The lichen grows on bark and forms a continuous, smooth, pale greenish-gray crust about 0.5–1.0 cm across and about 40–80 μm thick, without a visible prothallus. In section, the thallus has a thick, cartilaginous upper cortex, an irregular algal layer, and conspicuous clusters of calcium oxalate crystals.

The apothecia are lirelliform and flexuose, often partly branched and prominent, with a basal-to-lateral thalline margin; the disc is concealed. The labia are black and entire, and the exciple is completely carbonized (blackened). The hymenium is clear (not inspersed). Ascospores are colorless and oblong, produced 4–8 per ascus, transversely 7–10-septate, and measure about 25–35 × 7–10 μm. Thin-layer chromatography detects norstictic acid, with a K spot test yielding yellow that turns red.

== Habitat and distribution ==
Allographa chamelensis is known from low elevations in Jalisco, Mexico, in and around the Chamela Biological Station within the Chamela-Cuixmala Biosphere Reserve. The type collection came from the same transitional vegetation reported for G. bungartzii, but from a different host tree, Forchhammeria pallida.

Additional specimens were collected nearby – about 1–2 km (0.6–1.2 mi) from the type locality – at about 48–95 m (157–312 ft) elevation in seasonally tropical dry forest, on bark of Forchhammeria pallida, Bursera heteresthes, and Guettarda elliptica. The original description notes that, despite occurring on more host trees than G. bungartzii, it appears to be more localized and may depend on more specific microclimate conditions.

== See also ==
- List of Allographa species
