= Allographa uruguayensis =

Scientific classification
- Kingdom: Fungi
- Division: Ascomycota
- Class: Lecanoromycetes
- Order: Graphidales
- Family: Graphidaceae
- Genus: Allographa
- Species: A. uruguayensis

Binomial name
- Allographa uruguayensis Lücking ex Lücking (2018)

Synonyms
- Graphis uruguayensis Lücking (2009)

Species of lichen-forming fungus

Allographa uruguayensis is a species of corticolous (bark-dwelling), crustose lichen in the family Graphidaceae. Found in Uruguay, it was formally described as a new species in 2018 by lichenologist Robert Lücking. He had previously informally introduced the species as Graphis uruguayensis in a 2009 publication, but without a proper description. The type specimen was collected in 1968 by Henry Imshaug in Parque Franklin Delano Roosevelt, near Montevideo; here it was found in a planted grove containing Pinus and Eucalyptus. The lichen has a pale yellow-grey thallus, measuring 2–3 cm (0.8–1.2 in) across and 50–70 μm thick, which lacks a prothallus. The ascospores, which number 6 to 8 per ascus, are thick-walled, oblong with between 11 and 17 septa, and measure 45–70 by 6–8 μm. Allographa elongata is somewhat similar in morphology, but is distinguished by differences in the structure of the lirellae, and in ascospore width.

== See also ==
- List of Allographa species
