= Allographa jayatilakana =

Scientific classification
- Kingdom: Fungi
- Division: Ascomycota
- Class: Lecanoromycetes
- Order: Graphidales
- Family: Graphidaceae
- Genus: Allographa
- Species: A. jayatilakana

Binomial name
- Allographa jayatilakana Weerakoon, Arachchige & Lücking (2019)
- Type locality: Hokandara, Sri Lanka

Species of lichen-forming fungus

Allographa jayatilakana is a species of script lichen in the family Graphidaceae. Described in 2019 from a specimen collected on ornamental fig trees in Colombo, Sri Lanka, this bark-dwelling lichen is named in honour of Jayatilaka Bandara Weerakoon, father of one of the describing authors. The species is recognized by its distinctive yellow to orange powder that coats the edges of its narrow, black, slit-like fruiting bodies, and is currently known only from the type locality in urban Sri Lanka.

== Taxonomy ==
Allographa jayatilakana was described in 2019 by Gothamie Weerakoon, Arachchige, and Robert Lücking. The type was collected on the bark of an ornamental fig tree (Ficus benjamina) in Hokandara, Colombo City (Western Province, Sri Lanka; 75 m elevation) on 28 April 2015. The epithet commemorates the late Jayatilaka Bandara Weerakoon, father of the second author. It belongs to the group of Allographa species characterised by pigmented, yellow-to-orange powdered rims on the slit-like fruiting bodies (lirellae). In the Sri Lankan key it runs to the couplet "lirellae with yellow–orange pruina", separating it from superficially similar taxa that lack this pigment coating.

== Description ==
The lichen forms a thin, grey to white-grey crust (thallus) with a distinct surface skin (cortex). Scattered across it are short, straight to only sparsely branched lirellae, which are narrow, black, slit-like fruiting bodies 1–5 mm long and about 0.3–0.4 mm wide. Their "lips" (labia) are mostly smooth but can become faintly grooved (striate) in older parts. A diagnostic feature is the conspicuous yellow to yellow-orange powder (pruina) that dusts the sides of the lirellae; this pigment is an anthraquinone compound. The wall of each fruiting body (excipulum) is completely carbonised (black and charcoal-like), and the spore-bearing layer (hymenium) is clear, i.e., without dispersed granules.

Ascospores are produced eight per sac (ascus), colourless, and relatively long (80–120 × 9–12 μm). They are described as "terminally muriform" (with 15–19 transverse septa and 1–2 longitudinal septa limited to the end cells), and bear gelatinous caps at both ends that are rounded proximally and fin-like distally. A spot test with potassium hydroxide solution (K) on the lirellae turns the anthraquinone pigment yellow and then violet to purple, a useful chemical check in the field and under the microscope.

=== Similar species ===
Allographa jayatilakana differs from A. flavominiata in having much shorter ascospores, from A. firferi in having terminally muriform spores (firferi is only transversely septate), and from A. ochracea in its yellow (not orange) anthraquinone that is K+ (yellow → slowly purple–violet).

== Habitat and distribution ==
As of its original publication, the lichen was known only from the type locality at Hokandara in Colombo City (Western Province, Sri Lanka), where it grows on smooth bark of ornamental trees in a garden setting. The area's original vegetation is tropical wet evergreen forest but has largely been converted by urbanisation and agriculture; the authors suggest the species is probably more frequent in the upper canopy of remaining forest fragments in the region.

== See also ==
- List of Allographa species
