= Allographa grandis =

Scientific classification
- Kingdom: Fungi
- Division: Ascomycota
- Class: Lecanoromycetes
- Order: Graphidales
- Family: Graphidaceae
- Genus: Allographa
- Species: A. grandis

Binomial name
- Allographa grandis Kalb (2020)

Species of lichen-forming fungus

Allographa grandis is a species of corticolous (bark-dwelling) lichen in the family Graphidaceae. Found in Cameroon, it is characterised its large ascomata and ascospores (for which it is named), and an inspersed hymenium.

== Taxonomy ==
Allographa grandis was first described by German lichenologist Klaus Kalb as a new species in 2020. The specific epithet, grandis, highlights the lichen's large ascomata and ascospores. The type specimen was discovered in the Begalanda Mountains near Nyangong Village in the Republic of Cameroon.

== Description ==
The thallus of Allographa grandis ranges from beige to greyish white in colour. Its surface is smooth and has a cortex with a dull to slightly shiny appearance. The lirellae of this lichen are erumpent to prominent, possessing a complete whitish thalline margin. They can be elongated, straight, curved, or sinuose, with lengths of up to 15 mm and widths of 1 mm.

The ascomata of Allographa grandis are of the illinata-morph type, and its exciple is apically carbonized. This lichen bears hyaline ascospores that turn slightly brownish with age. These richly muriform spores measure 110–175 by 25–48 μm and have 40–50 by 8–12 septa. When treated with iodine, the spores exhibit a blue reaction.

One of the key differences between Allographa grandis and the similar Graphis insulana is the inspersion type, which categorizes the species within the genus Allographa. No other species in this genus appears to be similar to A. grandis.

== Habitat and distribution ==
Allographa grandis is found growing on the bark of trees in pristine rainforests. Its type locality is situated at an elevation of 850 m (2,790 ft) in the Begalanda Mountains near Nyangong Village, in the South Province of Cameroon.

== Chemistry ==
The chemical constituents of Allographa grandis include norstictic acid (major), connorstictic acid (minor), and subnorstictic acid (trace). These lichen products contribute to its unique characteristics and help distinguish it from other species.

== See also ==
- List of Allographa species
