= Allographa hypostictica =

Scientific classification
- Kingdom: Fungi
- Division: Ascomycota
- Class: Lecanoromycetes
- Order: Graphidales
- Family: Graphidaceae
- Genus: Allographa
- Species: A. hypostictica

Binomial name
- Allographa hypostictica Kalb & Aptroot (2018)

Species of lichen-forming fungus

Allographa hypostictica is a species of saxicolous (rock-dwelling), crustose lichen in the family Graphidaceae, Found in Brazil, it was described as a new species in 2018. Its thallus contains hypostictic acid and its distinctive apothecia and ascospores.

== Taxonomy ==
Allographa hypostictica was formally described by the lichenologists Klaus Kalb and Andre Aptroot in 2018. The type specimen was collected in the Serra do Espinhaço, specifically Serra do Caraça, Minas Gerais, Brazil, on a sandstone boulder in an open cerrado at an elevation of 1,450 m (4,760 ft). The specific epithet hypostictica refers to the presence of the chemical compound hypostictic acid, a rare lichen product in the genus Allographa.

== Description ==
The thallus of Allographa hypostictica is saxicolous, crustose, areolate to rimose, uneven, not corticate, dull, and ochraceous white, dissected by black hypothallus lines, and up to 0.2 mm thick. It is surrounded by a black prothallus that also extends under much of the thallus as a hypothallus. The photobiont is trentepohlioid. Ascomata are sessile, completely carbonised, with striate labia, circular in outline with straight linear or sparingly branched split-like disc, measuring 0.5–1.3 mm in diameter and about 0.2–0.4 mm high. The rim is black, and the thalline margin is lateral and ochraceous white. The hamathecium is approximately 200 μm high and not inspersed. Ascospores are single per ascus, hyaline but soon becoming pale brown, ellipsoid, densely muriform, approximately 50 by 8-septate, measuring 115–145 by 28–37 μm, constricted at several major septa, and surrounded by a gelatinous sheath about 3 μm thick. Pycnidia were not observed to occur in this species.

Chemical tests reveal that the thallus is UV−, C−, P−, and K+ (yellow). Thin-layer chromatography, a technique used to identify chemical substances, shows the presence of hypostictic acid as the major component, and trace amounts of hypoconstictic acid.

== Habitat and distribution ==
Allographa hypostictica was found on a sandstone boulder in an open cerrado habitat. This lichen is only known to occur in Brazil.

== See also ==
- List of Allographa species
