= Allographa exuens =

Scientific classification
- Kingdom: Fungi
- Division: Ascomycota
- Class: Lecanoromycetes
- Order: Graphidales
- Family: Graphidaceae
- Genus: Allographa
- Species: A. exuens

Binomial name
- Allographa exuens Lücking, B.Moncada & Álvaro (2023)
- Type locality: Caquetá Department, Colombia

Species of lichen-forming fungus

Allographa exuens is a species of crustose lichen-forming fungus in the family Graphidaceae. It is a whitish, bark-dwelling lichen with prominent, slit-like fruiting bodies whose outer covering tends to flake away, exposing black lips beneath. The species was described in 2023 and is known only from the canopy of lowland rainforest in the Colombian Amazon.

== Taxonomy ==
Allographa exuens was described as a new species by Robert Lücking, Bibiana Moncada, and Wilson Ricardo Álvaro-Alba from material collected in the Colombian Amazon. The authors compared it with Allographa argentata, from which it differs in the form of its slit-like fruiting bodies (lirellae), a less oil-droplet-filled spore-bearing layer (less hymenial inspersion), and narrower ascospores. The species was placed in the genus Allographa based on its prominent fruiting bodies (lirellae) with a strongly carbonized (blackened) excipulum and other anatomical characters. The species epithet exuens (from Latin exuere, meaning 'to undress') refers to the fruiting bodies' tendency to shed their bark-like outer covering, exposing the naked black lips (labia) beneath.

== Description ==
The lichen forms a crustose thallus on bark, up to 5 cm (2 in) across and about 30–70 μm thick. The surface is whitish and shiny, with an uneven texture that follows the bark. A prothallus is absent or may appear as a thin, irregular black line where the thallus meets other lichens. The photobiont is from the green algal genus Trentepohlia.

The slit-like fruiting bodies (lirellae) are mostly unbranched and 1–3 mm long by 0.2–0.3 mm wide, ranging from partly protruding (erumpent) to prominently raised. They have a thin, bark-like outer covering (corticiform) that commonly flakes away, exposing the black lips (labia); the inner disc remains hidden. The outer wall (excipulum) is completely carbonized and 40–80 μm wide, and the spore-bearing layer (hymenium) is 90–100 μm high and only finely permeated with oil droplets (finely inspersed), with the oil droplets dissolving rapidly in K (potassium hydroxide solution). The asci are spindle-shaped (fusiform, about 90–100 μm long and 20–25 μm wide), each containing 2–4 colorless ascospores that are divided by both transverse and longitudinal cross-walls (muriform). The ascospores are oblong to cylindrical, 70–100 × 12–15 μm, and stain violet-blue with iodine (I+ violet-blue). No secondary metabolites were detected by thin-layer chromatography.

== Habitat and distribution ==
The species is known only from its type locality in Caquetá, Colombia, about 2.5 km (1.6 mi) northeast of Araracuara at 250 m (820 ft) elevation. It was collected as an epiphyte on canopy branches in a largely undisturbed forest on a low terrace of the Caquetá River, where it appeared to favour the better-lit upper layers of the rainforest.

== See also ==
- List of Allographa species
