= Allographa aptrootiana =

Scientific classification
- Kingdom: Fungi
- Division: Ascomycota
- Class: Lecanoromycetes
- Order: Graphidales
- Family: Graphidaceae
- Genus: Allographa
- Species: A. aptrootiana

Binomial name
- Allographa aptrootiana (Van den Broeck, Lücking & Ertz) Lücking & Kalb (2018)

Synonyms
- Graphis aptrootiana Van den Broeck, Lücking & Ertz (2014)

Species of lichen-forming fungus

Allographa aptrootiana is a species of script lichen in the family Graphidaceae that is found in tropical Africa. It was formally described as a new species in 2014 by Dries Van den Broeck, Robert Lücking, and Damien Ertz. The type locality is Yaengo (Orientale Province, Democratic Republic of the Congo; here it was found growing on the bark of an unidentified tree species in an evergreen forest. The lichen somewhat resembles Graphis tetralocularis in overall morphology, but unlike that species it has a completely carbonized (blackened) excipulum, and does not produce the secondary compound atranorin. The holotype specimen is parasitised with Etayoa trypethelii, a widespread tropical lichenicolous fungus. The specific epithet aptrootiana honours André Aptroot, "in recognition of his many contributions to tropical lichenology". The taxon was transferred to Allographa in 2018 following a reinstatement and reorganization of that genus.

== See also ==
- List of Allographa species
