= Allographa weerasooriyana =

Scientific classification
- Kingdom: Fungi
- Division: Ascomycota
- Class: Lecanoromycetes
- Order: Graphidales
- Family: Graphidaceae
- Genus: Allographa
- Species: A. weerasooriyana

Binomial name
- Allographa weerasooriyana Weerakoon, Arachchige, & Lücking (2019)
- Holotype: Halgolla Tea Estate, Sri Lanka

Species of lichen-forming fungus

Allographa weerasooriyana is a species of script lichen in the family Graphidaceae. Described in 2019 from specimens collected in the tea estates of Sri Lanka's Sabaragamuwa hill range, this bark-dwelling lichen is named in honour of Sri Lankan botanist Aruna Weerasooriya. The species is distinguished by its pale, warty crust marked with narrow, branching black slits that have characteristically bumpy borders, and it is known to occur only in montane tea plantation areas in Sri Lanka.

== Taxonomy ==
Allographa weerasooriyana was described as new to science in 2019 by Gothamie Weerakoon, Omal Arachchige and Robert Lücking in their survey of Graphidaceae from Sri Lanka. The holotype comes from Halgolla Tea Estate in the Sabaragamuwa hill range (Sri Lanka) at 1,241 m elevation (collected July 1988; Cloonan 686), and the name commemorates the Sri Lankan botanist Aruna Weerasooriya. The species belongs to Allographa, a genus segregated from Graphis.

In a key to Sri Lankan species, A. weerasooriyana falls among taxa with a clear (non-granule-filled) hymenium and a thallus that reacts K+ (yellow) because of stictic acid. It is contrasted there with the widespread A. rustica: both share overall anatomy and chemistry, but A. weerasooriyana is set apart by a distinctly warted (verrucose) rim of thallus tissue around the lirellae and by lips (labia) that are not raised above that rim.

== Description ==
This is a bark-dwelling (corticolous) crustose lichen forming patches up to about 10 cm across. The thallus (lichen body) is light yellowish-grey with a marbled, coarsely warted surface, and in vertical section is about 100–150 μm thick with a thin cortex, an irregular algal layer, and a medulla containing abundant crystals. In everyday terms: it appears as a pale, slightly bumpy crust on tree bark.

The fruiting bodies are narrow, ink-coloured slits called lirellae, 3–10 mm long and about 0.4–0.6 mm wide. They are irregularly branched and sit flush with to slightly above the thallus (erumpent to prominent). Each slit is bordered by a relatively thick rim of the lichen's own tissue (the thalline margin), which is characteristically warted in this species; the black lips (labia) are entire (not striate) and are not raised above that rim. Internally, the walls of the lirellae are completely blackened (carbonised), and the hymenium (spore-producing layer) is colourless and clear (not inspersed with granules). Asci are fusiform (spindle-shaped), measuring 120–140 × 20–30 μm.

Ascospores are oblong, with 15–21 transverse partitions (septa), measuring about 70–90 × 10 μm, produced 4–8 per ascus, and they turn blue in iodine (I+ amyloid), a standard chemical test. In spot tests the thallus is K+ (yellow), consistent with the presence of stictic acid.

== Habitat and distribution ==
The species is, so far, recorded from the Sabaragamuwa mountain range of Sri Lanka, where it grows on tree bark in tea-estate settings at mid to high elevations. The type locality is Halgolla Tea Estate at 1,241 m; the authors also examined material from Coolbone Tea Estate at roughly 860 m. All known records are from human-impacted but humid montane habitats in that region.

== See also ==
- List of Allographa species
