= List of Allographa species =

This is a list of species in the script lichen genus Allographa. As of February 2026, Species Fungorum (in the Catalogue of Life) accepts 205 species of Allographa.

== A ==
- Allographa acharii (Fée) Lücking & Kalb (2018)
- Allographa adpressa (Vain.) Lücking & Kalb (2018)
- Allographa albotecta (Redinger) Lücking & Kalb (2018)
- Allographa altamirensis (Sipman & Lücking) Lücking & Kalb (2018)
- Allographa amazonica (M.Cáceres, Aptroot & Lücking) Lücking & Kalb (2018)
- Allographa ancelica Aptroot & M.Cáceres (2023) – Brazil
- Allographa anguilliradians Lücking (2018)
- Allographa angustata (Eschw.) Lücking & Kalb (2018)
- Allographa anomala (Leight.) Aptroot & Weerakoon (2023)
- Allographa apertoinspersa (Rivas Plata & Lücking) Lücking & Kalb (2018)
- Allographa apicalinspersa Aptroot & M.Cáceres (2023) – Brazil
- Allographa aptrootiana (Van den Broeck, Lücking & Ertz) Lücking & Kalb (2018)
- Allographa aquilonia (A.W.Archer) Lücking & Kalb (2018)
- Allographa argentata (Lücking & L.Umaña) Lücking & Kalb (2018)
- Allographa asterizans (Nyl.) Lücking & Kalb (2018)
- Allographa atrocelata (A.W.Archer) Lücking & Kalb (2018)
- Allographa atrocelatoides J.Kalb, Lücking & Kalb (2018)

== B ==
- Allographa balbisii (Fée) Lücking & Kalb (2018)
- Allographa balbisina (Nyl.) Lücking & Kalb (2018)
- Allographa bambusicola Weerakoon, Lücking & Aptroot (2019) – Sri Lanka
- Allographa barillasiae (van den Boom & Sipman) Lücking & Kalb (2018)
- Allographa basaltica (Kremp.) Lücking, M.Cáceres & Aptroot (2024)
- Allographa bettinae (Lücking, L.Umaña, Chaves & Sipman) Lücking & Kalb (2018)
- Allographa bifera (Zahlbr.) Lücking & Kalb (2018)
- Allographa binsarensis R.Adhikari, Neha Pal & Nayaka (2025)
- Allographa brachylirellata (M.Cáceres & Lücking) Lücking & Kalb (2018)
- Allographa brevissima (Fée) Lücking, M.Cáceres & Aptroot (2024)
- Allographa bukittimaensis (Weerakoon & Lücking) Lücking & Kalb (2018)
- Allographa byrsonimae (Redinger) Lücking, M.Cáceres & Aptroot (2024)

== C ==
- Allographa calcea (Fée) Lücking & Kalb (2018)
- Allographa cameroonensis Kalb & Schumm (2021)
- Allographa carassensis (Vain.) Lücking & Kalb (2018)
- Allographa celata (Stirt.) Lücking & Kalb (2018)
- Allographa cerradensis (Marcelli, Benatti & Lücking) Lücking & Kalb (2018)
- Allographa chamelensis (A.B.Peña & Lücking) Lücking & Kalb (2018)
- Allographa chloroalba (Makhija & Adaw.) Lücking & Kalb (2018)
- Allographa chlorocarpa (Fée) Lücking & Kalb (2018)
- Allographa chrysocarpa (Raddi) Lücking & Kalb (2018)
- Allographa cinerea (Fée) Lücking & Kalb (2018)
- Allographa cleistoblephara (Nyl.) Lücking & Kalb (2018)
- Allographa cleistomma (Nyl.) Lücking & Kalb (2018)
- Allographa cognata (Müll.Arg.) Lücking & Kalb (2018)
- Allographa comma (Ach.) Lücking & Kalb (2018)
- Allographa congesta (Fée) Lücking & Kalb (2018)
- Allographa conglomerata (Spreng.) Lücking & Kalb (2018)
- Allographa consanguinea (Müll.Arg.) Lücking & Kalb (2018)
- Allographa contorta (Müll.Arg.) Lücking & Kalb (2018)
- Allographa contortuplicata (Müll.Arg.) Lücking & Kalb (2018)
- Allographa curtiuscula (Zahlbr.) Lücking & Kalb (2018)
- Allographa cylindrospora (E.L.Lima, Lücking & M.Cáceres) Lücking & Kalb (2018)

== D ==
- Allographa daintreensis (A.W.Archer) Lücking & Kalb (2018)
- Allographa dealbata (Nyl.) Lücking & Kalb (2018)
- Allographa dispersa (Redinger) Lücking & Kalb (2018)
- Allographa dolichographa (Nyl.) Lücking & Kalb (2018)
- Allographa dotalugalensis (Weerakoon, Wijey. & Rivas Plata) Lücking & Kalb (2018)

== E ==
- Allographa effusosoredica P.A.Ansil, Rajeshk., Lücking & B.O.Sharma (2024) – India
- Allographa elevativerrucosa (Chitale, Makhija & B.O.Sharma) Lücking & Kalb (2018)
- Allographa elixii (A.W.Archer) Lücking & Kalb (2018)
- Allographa elmeri (Vain.) Lücking & Kalb (2018)
- Allographa elongata (Zenker) Lücking & Kalb (2018)
- Allographa epixantha (Mont. & Bosch) Lücking & Kalb (2018)
- Allographa exuens Lücking, B.Moncada & Álvaro (2023)
- Allographa exuta (S.Joshi, Upreti & Hur) Lücking & Kalb (2018)

== F ==
- Allographa farinulenta (Müll.Arg.) Lücking & Kalb (2018)
- Allographa firferi (Lücking) Lücking & Kalb (2018)
- Allographa flabillata (Makhija, Adaw. & Patw.) Lücking & Kalb (2018)
- Allographa flavens (Müll.Arg.) Lücking & Kalb (2018)
- Allographa flavoaltamirensis (Sipman & Lücking) Lücking & Kalb (2018)
- Allographa flavominiata (B.Moncada & Lücking) Lücking & Kalb (2018)
- Allographa fournieri (Lizano & Lücking) Lücking & Kalb (2018)
- Allographa frumentaria (Fée) Lücking & Kalb (2018)
- Allographa fujianensis (Z.F.Jia & J.C.Wei) Lücking & Kalb (2018)
- Allographa funilina (Aptroot) Lücking & Kalb (2018)

== G ==
- Allographa glauconigra (Vain.) Lücking & Kalb (2018)
- Allographa globosa (Fée) Lücking & Kalb (2018)
- Allographa gomezii (Lücking, Will-Wolf & L.Umaña) Lücking & Kalb (2018)
- Allographa guainiae Lücking, N.Marín & B.Moncada (2023)
- Allographa gracilescens (Redinger) Luch & Lücking (2018)
- Allographa grandis Kalb (2020)
- Allographa granulata (Fée) Lücking & Kalb (2018)
- Allographa granulosa (Müll.Arg.) Lücking & Kalb (2018)
- Allographa gregmuelleri (Sipman & Lücking) Lücking & Kalb (2018)
- Allographa guainiae Lücking, N.Marín & B.Moncada (2023)

== H ==
- Allographa hadrospora (A.W.Archer) Lücking & Kalb (2018)
- Allographa hainanense (Z.F.Jia) Lücking & Kalb (2018)
- Allographa heteroplaca (Müll.Arg.) Lücking, M.Cáceres & Aptroot (2024)
- Allographa hossei (Vain.) Lücking & Kalb (2018)
- Allographa hypostictica Kalb & Aptroot (2018)

== H ==
- Allographa illinata (Eschw.) Lücking & Kalb (2018)
- Allographa immersa (Müll.Arg.) Lücking & Kalb (2018)
- Allographa incerta (Redinger) Lücking & Kalb (2018)
- Allographa ingarum (Vain.) Lücking & Kalb (2018)
- Allographa inspersostictica (Sipman & Lücking) Lücking & Kalb (2018)
- Allographa inturgescens (Kremp.) Lücking & Kalb (2018)
- Allographa invisibilis (Dal-Forno & Eliasaro) Lücking & Kalb (2018)
- Allographa isidiata (Hale) Lücking & Kalb (2018)
- Allographa itatiaiensis (Nelsen, Lücking & A.A.Spielm.) Lücking & Kalb (2018)

== J ==
- Allographa jayatilakana Weerakoon, Arachchige & Lücking (2019) – Sri Lanka

== K ==
- Allographa kamojangensis Jatnika, Noer & Lücking (2019)
- Allographa kansriana J.Kalb, Lücking & Kalb (2018)
- Allographa knucklensis (Weerakoon, Wijey. & Wolseley) Lücking & Kalb (2018)
- Allographa kuetchangiana Kalb & Schumm (2021)

== L ==
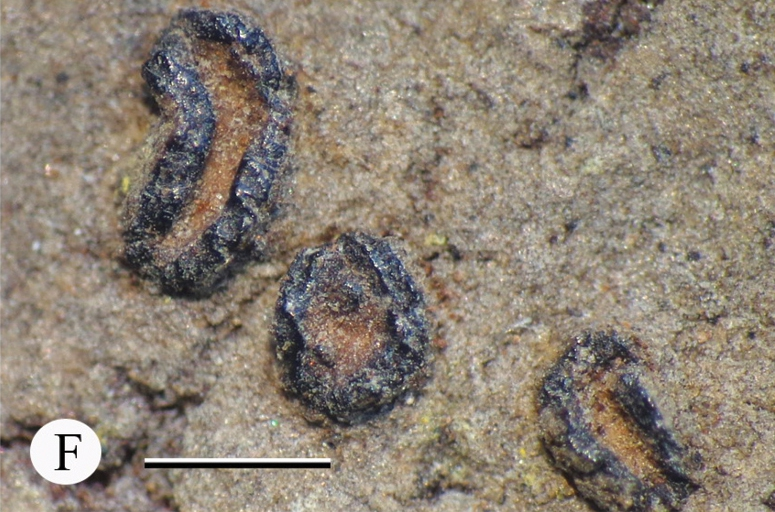
Allographa lecanactiformis

- Allographa labiata Lücking, N.Marín & B.Moncada (2023)
- Allographa laubertiana (Fée) Lücking & Kalb (2018)
- Allographa lecanactiformis (Zahlbr.) Lücking & Kalb (2018)
- Allographa leprographa (Nyl.) Lücking & Kalb (2018)
- Allographa leptospora (Vain.) Lücking & Kalb (2018)
- Allographa leucaenae (Aptroot) Lücking & Kalb (2018)
- Allographa lichexanthonica Lücking, N.Marín & B.Moncada (2023)
- Allographa lineatipruinosa Aptroot (2023) – Brazil
- Allographa longilirellata (B.O.Sharma & Khadilkar) Lücking & Kalb (2018)
- Allographa longissima (Makhija & Adaw.) Lücking & Kalb (2018)
- Allographa longula (Kremp.) Lücking & Kalb (2018)
- Allographa lourdesina (Aptroot) Lücking & Kalb (2018)
- Allographa lumbricina (Vain.) Lücking & Kalb (2018)
- Allographa lumbschii (A.W.Archer) Lücking & Kalb (2018)
- Allographa lutea Chevall. (1824)

== M ==
- Allographa macella (Kremp.) Lücking & Kalb (2018)
- Allographa mahaeliyensis (Weerakoon, Jayalal & Lücking) Lücking & Kalb (2018)
- Allographa malacodes (Nyl.) Lücking & Kalb (2018)
- Allographa marginata (Raddi) Lücking & Kalb (2018)
- Allographa medioinspersa Feuerstein & Aptroot (2020) – Brazil
- Allographa mexicana (Hale) Lücking & Kalb (2018)
- Allographa miniata (Redinger) Lücking & Kalb (2018)
- Allographa mirabilis (Lücking, Sipman, L.Umaña & Chaves) Lücking & Kalb (2018)
- Allographa multistriata (Müll.Arg.) Lücking & Kalb (2018)
- Allographa multisulcata (Müll.Arg.) Lücking & Kalb (2018)
- Allographa myolensis (Aptroot) Lücking & Kalb (2018)

== N ==
- Allographa nadurina (Aptroot) Lücking & Kalb (2018)
- Allographa nana (Fée) Lücking & Kalb (2018)
- Allographa norlabiata (Patw. & C.R.Kulk.) Lücking & Kalb (2018)
- Allographa norvestitoides (Sutjar.) Lücking & Kalb (2018)
- Allographa nuda (H.Magn.) Lücking & Kalb (2018)
- Allographa nudiformis (Lücking) Lücking & Kalb (2018)

== O ==
- Allographa obtectostriata (Käffer & Aptroot) Lücking & Kalb (2018)
- Allographa ochracea (C.W.Dodge) Lücking & Kalb (2018)
- Allographa oldayana I.D.Medeiros (2022) – South Africa
- Allographa olivacea (Redinger) Lücking & Kalb (2018)
- Allographa oryzaecarpa (Lücking) Lücking & Kalb (2018)
- Allographa oryzaeformis (Fée) Lücking & Kalb (2018)
- Allographa ovata (Fée) Lücking & Kalb (2018)
- Allographa oxyspora (Zahlbr.) Lücking & Kalb (2018)

== P ==
- Allographa pachygrapha (Nyl.) Lücking & Kalb (2018)
- Allographa parallela (Müll.Arg.) Lücking & Kalb (2018)
- Allographa patwardhanii (C.R.Kulk.) Lücking & Kalb (2018)
- Allographa pauciloculata (Coppins & P.James) Aptroot & Weerakoon (2023)
- Allographa pavoniana (Fée) Lücking & Kalb (2018)
- Allographa pedunculata (Bungartz & Aptroot) Lücking & Kalb (2018)
- Allographa phaeospora (Vain.) Lücking & Kalb (2018)
- Allographa pilarensis (M.Cáceres & Lücking) Lücking & Kalb (2018)
- Allographa pitmanii (Rivas Plata & Lücking) Lücking & Kalb (2018)
- Allographa pittieri (Lücking, L.Umaña, Sipman & Chaves) Lücking & Kalb (2018)
- Allographa plagiocarpa (Fée) Lücking & Kalb (2018)
- Allographa platypoda (Zahlbr.) Lücking, M.Cáceres & Aptroot (2024)
- Allographa plumbea (Zahlbr.) Lücking & Kalb (2018)
- Allographa plurispora (Redinger) Lücking & Kalb (2018)
- Allographa polillensis (Vain.) Lücking & Kalb (2018)
- Allographa polystriata (Makhija, A.Dube, Adaw. & Chitale) Lücking & Kalb (2018)
- Allographa pruinodisca Aptroot (2022) – Brazil
- Allographa pseudoaquilonia (Lücking) Lücking & Kalb (2018)
- Allographa pseudocinerea (Lücking & L.Umaña) Lücking & Kalb (2018)
- Allographa pseudoserpens (Chaves & Lücking) Lücking, M.Cáceres & Aptroot (2024)

== R ==
- Allographa regularis (Müll.Arg.) Lücking & Kalb (2018)
- Allographa rhizicola (Fée) Lücking & Kalb (2018)
- Allographa rimulosa (Mont.) Lücking & Kalb (2018)
- Allographa rufopallida (Vain.) Lücking & Kalb (2018)
- Allographa ruiziana (Fée) Lücking & Kalb (2018)
- Allographa rustica (Kremp.) Lücking & Kalb (2018)

== S ==
- Allographa salacinicum (G.Neuwirth, Aptroot & Stock.-Wörg.) Lücking & Kalb (2018)
- Allographa salacinilabiata (Patw. & C.R.Kulk.) Lücking & Kalb (2018)
- Allographa sarawakensis (Hale ex Lücking) Lücking & Kalb (2018)
- Allographa sauroidea (Leight.) Lücking & Kalb (2018)
- Allographa sayeri (Müll.Arg.) Lücking & Kalb (2018)
- Allographa scaphella (Ach.) Lücking & Kalb (2018)
- Allographa schummii J.Kalb, Lücking & Kalb (2018)
- Allographa seminuda (Müll.Arg.) Lücking & Kalb (2018)
- Allographa semirigida (Müll.Arg.) Lücking & Kalb (2018)
- Allographa sessilis Lücking, N.Marín & B.Moncada (2023)
- Allographa singaporensis (Weerakoon & Lücking) Lücking & Kalb (2018)
- Allographa sitiana (Vain.) Lücking & Kalb (2018)
- Allographa sitianoides J.Kalb, Lücking & Kalb (2018)
- Allographa sorsogona (Vain.) Lücking & Kalb (2018)
- Allographa sterlingiana (E.A.Tripp & Lendemer) Lücking & Kalb (2018)
- Allographa stictilabiata (Patw. & C.R.Kulk.) J.Kalb & Kalb (2017)
- Allographa striatula (Ach.) Lücking & Kalb (2018)
- Allographa subamylacea (Zahlbr.) Lücking & Kalb (2018)
- Allographa subargentata (S.C.Feuerst., Dal-Forno & Eliasaro) Lücking, M.Cáceres & Aptroot (2024)
- Allographa subassimilis (Müll.Arg.) Lücking & Kalb (2018)
- Allographa subcelata (A.W.Archer) Lücking & Kalb (2018)
- Allographa subdisserpens (Nyl.) Lücking & Kalb (2018)
- Allographa subdussii (Poengs. & Kalb) Lücking & Kalb (2018)
- Allographa subelmeri (A.W.Archer) Lücking & Kalb (2018)
- Allographa subflexibilis (Lücking & Chaves) Lücking & Kalb (2018)
- Allographa subimmersa (Fée) Lücking & Kalb (2018)
- Allographa submirabilis (van den Boom & Sipman) Lücking & Kalb (2018)
- Allographa subradiata (Nyl.) Lücking & Kalb (2018)
- Allographa subruiziana (Sipman, Chaves & Lücking) Lücking & Kalb (2018)
- Allographa subserpens (Staiger) Lücking & Kalb (2018)
- Allographa subturgidula (Lücking & Sipman) Lücking & Kalb (2018)
- Allographa superans (Müll.Arg.) Lücking & Kalb (2018)
- Allographa supertecta (Müll.Arg.) Lücking & Kalb (2018)
- Allographa suprainspersata Lücking, N.Marín & B.Moncada (2023)

== T ==
- Allographa tamiamiensis (Lendemer) Lücking & Kalb (2018)
- Allographa triangularis Aptroot (2024)
- Allographa trichospora (Vain.) Lücking & Kalb (2018)
- Allographa tricolorata (Redinger) Lücking, M.Cáceres & Aptroot (2024)
- Allographa triphora (Nyl.) Lücking & Kalb (2018)
- Allographa tumidula (Fée) Lücking & Kalb (2018)

== U ==
- Allographa upduna Lücking & Kalb (2018)
- Allographa upretii (S.Joshi & Hur) Lücking & Kalb (2018)
- Allographa uruguayensis Lücking (2018)

== V ==
- Allographa vandenboomiana (Ertz, Lücking & Van den Broeck) Lücking & Kalb (2018)
- Allographa variopruinata Aptroot (2023) – Brazil
- Allographa verminosa (Müll.Arg.) Lücking & Kalb (2018)
- Allographa vernicosa (Fée) Lücking & Kalb (2018)
- Allographa vestita (Fr.) Lücking & Kalb (2018)
- Allographa vestitoides (Fink) Lücking & Kalb (2018)

== W ==
- Allographa wangii (Z.F.Jia) Lücking & Kalb (2018)
- Allographa weerasooriyana Weerakoon, Arachchige & Lücking (2019) – Sri Lanka
- Allographa weii (Z.F.Jia & Kalb) Lücking & Kalb (2018)

== X ==
- Allographa xanthospora (Müll.Arg.) Lücking & Kalb (2018)

== See also ==
- List of Graphis (lichen) species
