= Allographa suprainspersata =

Scientific classification
- Kingdom: Fungi
- Division: Ascomycota
- Class: Lecanoromycetes
- Order: Graphidales
- Family: Graphidaceae
- Genus: Allographa
- Species: A. suprainspersata

Binomial name
- Allographa suprainspersata Lücking, N.Marín & B.Moncada (2023)
- Type locality: Gran Jardín de la Sierra, Nariño, Colombia

Species of lichen-forming fungus

Allographa suprainspersata is a species of crustose lichen-forming fungus in the family Graphidaceae. It is a white-gray, shiny, bark-dwelling lichen with long, wavy, slit-like fruiting bodies that have distinctively grooved black lips. The species was described in 2023 and is known only from lower montane rainforest in Nariño, Colombia.

== Taxonomy ==
Allographa suprainspersata was described as a new species by Robert Lücking, Norida Lucia Marín-Canchala, and Bibiana Moncada. The species epithet suprainspersata refers to the spore-bearing layer (hymenium), which is finely permeated with oil droplets (inspersed) in its upper portion.

== Description ==
This lichen grows on bark and forms a crust-like body (thallus) up to 5 cm (2 in) across and 150–250 μm thick. The surface is white-gray and shiny, ranging from smooth to uneven or finely warty (irregularly verruculose). No visible border zone (prothallus) is present, though a thin, irregular black line may appear where the thallus meets neighboring lichens. In cross-section, the thallus has a firm outer skin (cortex, 20–30 μm thick), an algal layer measuring 30–60 μm thick, and an inner tissue (medulla, 100–150 μm thick) with clusters of calcium oxalate crystals. The algal partner (photobiont) is from the green algal genus Trentepohlia.

The fruiting bodies are slit-like structures (lirellae) that are wavy (flexuose) and irregularly branched, partly protruding from the thallus (erumpent) to prominently raised, and typically 3–10 mm long and 0.3–0.4 mm wide. They have a thin thallus-derived rim (thalline margin), while the lips (labia) are usually covered by a thin, non-algal, bark-like layer; the inner disc is hidden from view. The lips are distinctly grooved (striate) and black, but can appear dark gray because of the thin covering layer. The outer wall (excipulum) is completely blackened (carbonized) and deeply scalloped (crenulate) at the top, 70–150 μm wide, with an orange-brown inner portion. The spore-bearing layer (hymenium) is 130–170 μm high and mostly clear, though the uppermost 20–30 μm is finely permeated with oil droplets (inspersed). The asci are spindle-shaped (fusiform, 120–150 × 20–25 μm), each containing (6–)8 ascospores. The ascospores are oblong, divided into 20–26 cells (19–25-septate), 90–105 × 11–13 μm, and stain violet-blue with iodine (I+ violet-blue). No secondary metabolites were detected by thin-layer chromatography.

== Habitat and distribution ==
The species is only known to occur in the type locality in Colombia (department of Nariño, municipality of Córdoba), where it was collected at 622 m (2,041 ft) elevation on tree bark in the lower montane rain forest zone.

== See also ==
- List of Allographa species
