= Allographa labiata =

Scientific classification
- Kingdom: Fungi
- Division: Ascomycota
- Class: Lecanoromycetes
- Order: Graphidales
- Family: Graphidaceae
- Genus: Allographa
- Species: A. labiata

Binomial name
- Allographa labiata Lücking, N.Marín & B.Moncada (2023)
- Type locality: Municipality of Florencia, Colombia

Species of lichen-forming fungus

Allographa labiata is a species of crustose lichen-forming fungus in the family Graphidaceae. It is a shiny, white-gray to greenish-gray, bark-dwelling lichen with wavy, star-like branching fruiting bodies that have conspicuous black lips. The species was described in 2023 and is known only from roadside vegetation at 1,800 m (5,900 ft) elevation in Caquetá, Colombia.

== Taxonomy ==
Allographa labiata was described as a new species in 2023 by Robert Lücking, Norida Lucia Marín-Canchala, and Bibiana Moncada. The species epithet refers to the conspicuous labia of the fruiting bodies (lirellae).

== Description ==
The lichen body (thallus) is a crust growing on bark, up to 3 cm (1.2 in) across and 100–150 μm thick, with a white-gray to pale yellowish or greenish-gray, shiny surface that is uneven to finely warty (irregularly verruculose). No visible border zone (prothallus) is present, though a thin, irregular black line may appear where the thallus meets neighboring lichens. In cross-section, the thallus has a distinct outer skin (cortex, 20–30 μm), a compact algal layer measuring 40–60 μm, and a thick inner tissue (medulla, 40–60 μm) that is heavily encrusted with small gray crystals. The algal photosynthetic partner (photobiont) is from the green algal genus Trentepohlia.

The slit-like fruiting bodies (lirellae) are wavy (flexuose) and irregularly to star-like branched, often pinched at branch points, and become prominently raised. They are typically 1–3 (sometimes up to 5) mm long and 0.3–0.4 mm wide, with the inner disc hidden from view. The lips (labia) are black, smooth-edged, and fully exposed in the upper portion, with a very thin pale yellowish frosting (pruina). Older lirellae may become overgrown by thallus tissue, producing a thick, white-gray thallus-derived rim (thalline margin) over those older structures. The outer wall (excipulum) is irregular and deeply scalloped (crenate) owing to the layering of older fruiting bodies, and appears completely blackened (carbonized) in thick sections, while thin sections reveal interruptions by light yellowish-brown zones of interwoven, elongated cells (prosoplectenchymatous areas). The spore-bearing layer (hymenium) is 150–180 μm high and mostly clear, but finely permeated with oil droplets (inspersed) in the uppermost and side layers, and the uppermost tissue (epithecium) is brown-black with a greenish tinge. The asci are spindle-shaped (fusiform, 120–150 × 20–25 μm), each containing 4–8 colorless ascospores that are oblong-cylindrical, divided into 20–26 cells (19–25-septate), and measure 100–130 × 11–15 μm. They stain violet-blue with iodine.

Stictic acid has been reported as a secondary metabolite, apparently concentrated in the pruina on the labia; sections along the labial surface are K+ persistently yellow.

== Habitat and distribution ==
The species is currently known only from the type locality in Colombia (department of Caquetá), where it was collected at 1,800 m (5,900 ft) elevation in partly disturbed roadside vegetation, growing on bark.

== See also ==
- List of Allographa species
