= Allographa anguilliradians =

Scientific classification
- Kingdom: Fungi
- Division: Ascomycota
- Class: Lecanoromycetes
- Order: Graphidales
- Family: Graphidaceae
- Genus: Allographa
- Species: A. anguilliradians

Binomial name
- Allographa anguilliradians Lücking ex Lücking (2018)

Synonyms
- Graphis anguilliradians Lücking (2009)

Species of lichen-forming fungus

Allographa anguilliradians is a species of corticolous (bark-dwelling), crustose lichen in the family Graphidaceae. It has been found in Trinidad and Tobago and Central-West Brazil. Its thallus covers an area of 3 to 7 cm in diameter with a slim profile and a variable surface texture, with a distinct metallic pale grey-olive colour without a prothallus. Its reproductive structures, known as lirellae, form a star-like pattern with black, carbonised outer layers and clear, colourless hymenium (fertile spore-bearing tissue), while its ascospores are oblong and segmented, reacting violet-blue to iodine-based stains.

== Taxonomy ==
Allographa anguilliradians was initially described as Graphis anguilliradians by Robert Lücking in 2009. However, this was a nomen invalidum designation, meaning the taxon was not validly published. The species was formally described and validly published in the genus Allographa by Lücking in 2018.

== Description ==
The thallus of Allographa anguilliradians has a corticolous (tree-bark dwelling) and crustose (crust-like) form. It extends over an area measuring between 3 and 7 cm (1.2 and 2.8 in) in diameter and maintains a slim profile with a thickness ranging from 50 to 100 μm. The surface texture of the thallus is variable, ranging from smooth to slightly irregular, and it has a distinct metallic pale grey-olive colouration. This lichen lacks a prothallus, which is a characteristic growth edge found in some lichen species.

Upon examining a cross-section of the thallus, several key features are observable. The uppermost layer, known as the cortex, is cartilaginous, providing a somewhat tough and rubbery texture. Beneath this layer lies an irregularly distributed algal layer, essential for the lichen's photosynthetic activity. Additionally, the thallus contains clusters of calcium oxalate crystals.

The reproductive structures, known as lirellae, are flexuose (wavy) and show radial branching, creating a star-like pattern. These lirellae are conspicuous and characterised by their thin yet complete thalline margins at the apex. They vary in size, measuring 3 to 10 mm in length and 0.15 to 0.25 mm in width. The reproductive disc of the lirellae is concealed, and the surrounding labia (edge structures) are entirely black. However, due to the thin overlying thallus cover, they may appear dark grey. The excipulum, or the outermost layer of the lirellae, is completely carbonised and measures 50 to 100 μm in width. It is enveloped laterally by a corticate, algae-containing thallus layer, which also includes crystal clusters.

The hymenium, the spore-bearing layer within the lirellae, is clear and colourless, with a height ranging between 130 and 170 μm. The paraphyses within the hymenium are simple and unbranched. The asci, the spore-containing structures, are fusiform (spindle-shaped) and vary in size from 120 to 150 μm in length and 20 to 25 μm in width. The ascospores produced by Allographa anguilliradians are oblong and segmented, having 9 to 13 septa. These spores measure 50 to 70 by 8 to 11 μm and are colourless. They have a violet-blue reaction when subjected to an iodine-based stain. Thin-layer chromatography, a technique used to identify chemical substances, did not detect any lichen products in this species.

== Habitat and distribution ==
The type locality of Allographa anguilliradians is in Trinidad and Tobago, specifically in Trinidad, Tunapuna–Piarco, on the ridge from the summit of Morne Bleu to Lalaja-Paria Trail in the Northern Range, between Arima and Blanchisseuse. The holotype was collected in October 1963 by Henry Imshaug. It was recorded from Mato Grosso do Sul, Brazil, in 2022.

== See also ==
- List of Allographa species
