= Allographa sessilis =

Scientific classification
- Kingdom: Fungi
- Division: Ascomycota
- Class: Lecanoromycetes
- Order: Graphidales
- Family: Graphidaceae
- Genus: Allographa
- Species: A. sessilis

Binomial name
- Allographa sessilis Lücking, N.Marín & B.Moncada (2023)
- Type locality: La Ceiba indigenous community, Colombia

Species of lichen-forming fungus

Allographa sessilis is a species of crustose lichen-forming fungus in the family Graphidaceae. It is a white, bark-dwelling lichen with wavy, prominently raised, slit-like fruiting bodies that become strongly elevated above the thallus surface with age. The species was described in 2023 from white-sand savanna habitats in the Colombian departments of Guainía and Vaupés.

== Taxonomy ==
Allographa sessilis was described as a new species in 2023 by Robert Lücking, Norida Marín-Canchala, and Bibiana Moncada. The species epithet sessilis refers to the fruiting bodies, which become prominently raised and sit directly on the thallus surface (strongly sessile).

== Description ==
The body (thallus) is crust-forming (crustose), reaching up to 3 cm across and about 100–150 μm thick. It is white and opaque, with a smooth to uneven surface; no visible border zone (prothallus) is present, though a thin, irregular black line may appear where the thallus meets neighboring lichens. In cross-section, the thallus has a loose outer skin (cortex, 15–25 μm), a diffuse algal layer, measuring 30–50 μm, and a thick inner tissue (medulla, 50–80 μm) containing clusters of calcium oxalate crystals. The algal partner (photobiont) is from the green algal genus Trentepohlia.

The slit-like fruiting bodies (lirellae) are wavy (flexuose) and irregularly branched, at first partly protruding from the thallus (erumpent) to prominent, but later becoming strongly raised and sitting directly on the surface. They lack a thallus-derived rim (thalline margin) and measure 2–5 mm long, 0.2–0.4 mm wide, and up to 0.5 mm high; the inner disc is hidden from view. The lips (labia) are initially smooth-edged but later become distinctly grooved (striate) and black. The outer wall (excipulum) becomes deeply scalloped (crenulate) and is completely blackened (carbonized, 70–150 μm wide). The asci are club-shaped (clavate, 120–130 μm long, 30–35 μm wide), each containing 4–8 colorless ascospores. The ascospores are oblong and divided by both transverse and longitudinal cross-walls (muriform), measuring 70–100 × 15–25 μm; they stain violet-blue with iodine (I+ violet-blue). No secondary metabolites were detected by thin-layer chromatography.

== Habitat and distribution ==
The species is known from several collections in two departments of Colombia (Guainía and Vaupés). It grows on tree bark (corticolous), largely in white-sand savanna vegetation. The type collection was made at 180 m (590 ft) elevation in natural savannas over white sand near Inírida (Guainía).

== See also ==
- List of Allographa species
