= Allographa pedunculata =

Scientific classification
- Kingdom: Fungi
- Division: Ascomycota
- Class: Lecanoromycetes
- Order: Graphidales
- Family: Graphidaceae
- Genus: Allographa
- Species: A. pedunculata

Binomial name
- Allographa pedunculata (Bungartz & Aptroot) Lücking & Kalb (2018)

Synonyms
- Graphis pedunculata Bungartz & Aptroot (2010)

Species of lichen-forming fungus

Allographa pedunculata is a species of script lichen in the family Graphidaceae, discovered in the Galápagos Islands. The species is characterized by its distinctly stalked lirellae and contains norstictic acid. It is similar to other species in the Graphis nuda species complex but has the longest ascospores in the group.

== Taxonomy ==
The lichen was first formally described by lichenologists Frank Bungartz and André Aptroot in 2010, as a member of the genus Graphis. The species is part of the Graphis nuda group and is closely related to Graphis emersa, another species containing norstictic acid. Robert Lücking and Klaus Kalb transferred the taxon to the genus Allographa in 2018.

== Description ==
The thallus of Allographa pedunculata is thin and continuous, either forming a thin film encrusting bryophytes and plant debris, or granular to granular verrucose, over rock. The thallus surface is smooth and shiny, pale creamy white to brownish, and not pruinose. Its apothecia are typically distinctly and conspicuously stalked, rarely sessile, and lirellate. The lirellae are very broad and short, and never branched. The labia are thick, entire, and black, only basally more or less covered by a thin thallus layer. The hymenium is hyaline and clear. The ascospores are hyaline to pale gray, brownish with age, and measure 22–27 by (80)130–210 μm; they are transversely septate with (11)16–22 cells.

The lichen contains norstictic acid, which causes a K+ (yellow turning red) (red crystals) and P+ (yellow) spot test reactions. It is C−.

== Habitat and distribution ==
Allographa pedunculata is currently known from a single collection site on a sheltered and shaded basalt cliff at the top of Cerro Gavilán in Santiago Island. The species prefers rock substrates and is found in a distinct habitat compared to its close relative, Graphis cleistomma, which has been found encrusting bryophytes and plant debris.

== See also ==
- List of Allographa species
