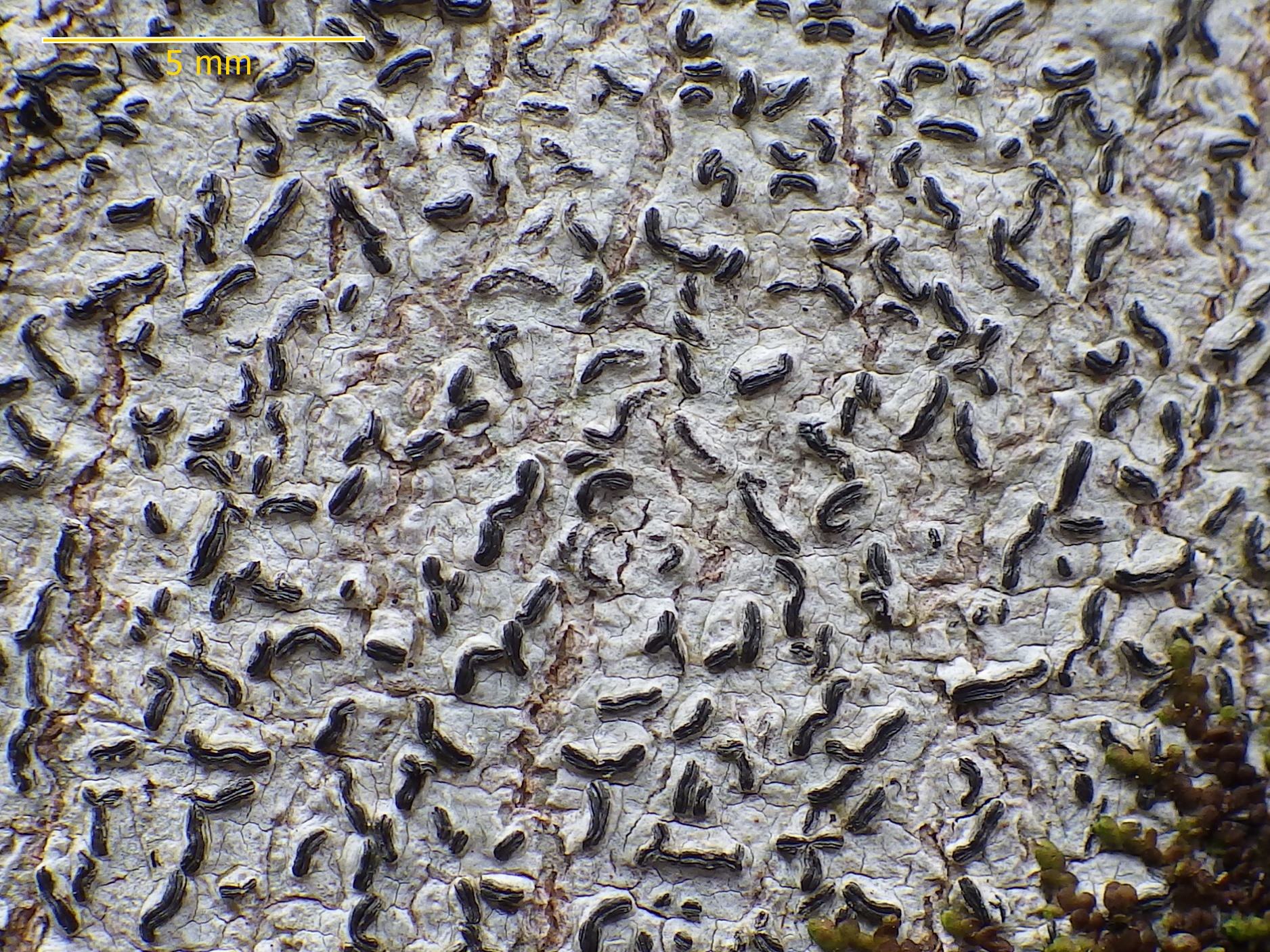

Scientific classification
- Kingdom: Fungi
- Division: Ascomycota
- Class: Lecanoromycetes
- Order: Graphidales
- Family: Graphidaceae
- Genus: Allographa
- Species: A. leptospora

Binomial name
- Allographa leptospora (Vain.) Lücking & Kalb (2018)

Synonyms
- Graphis leptospora Vain. (1921)

= Allographa leptospora =

Species of lichen-forming fungus

Allographa leptospora is a species of script lichen in the family Graphidaceae. It is characterized by its whitish thallus and distinctive reproductive structures with parallel striations. First described in 1921 by the Finnish lichenologist Edvard August Vainio as Graphis leptospora based on specimens collected from Thailand, the species was later reclassified into the genus Allographa in 2018. This predominantly tropical lichen contains norstictic acid, producing a yellow-to-red chemical reaction when tested. Though historically known only from tropical regions, it was discovered in Portugal in 2016—its first documented occurrence in Europe—where it grows in oak forests at various elevations. Its appearance in Europe may be linked to climate change creating favourable conditions for tropical species to establish in certain European microclimates.

== Taxonomy ==
The lichen was first formally described in 1921 by the Finnish lichenologist Edvard August Vainio as Graphis leptospora. The type specimen was collected in 1904 by the German botanist Carl Curt Hosseus on Doi Suthep (Chiang Mai Province, Thailand), where it was found growing on tree bark. Hosseus sent this and other lichens collected from Thailand to Vainio for identification. Robert Lücking and Klaus Kalb transferred it to the genus Allographa in 2018.

== Description ==
Allographa leptospora has a whitish thallus (the main body of the lichen) that produces a distinctive yellow-to-red reaction when potassium hydroxide (KOH) solution is applied, indicating the presence of norstictic acid. This chemical composition was confirmed through thin-layer chromatography testing.

The lichen's reproductive structures, called lirellae, are classified as "acharii-morph" type—relatively thick and featuring distinctive striations (parallel grooves or ridges). Unlike many related species in the genus Graphis found in Portugal, A. leptospora has a hymenium (the spore-producing layer) that is not inspersed, meaning it lacks oil droplets dispersed throughout this tissue.

Its ascospores (spores produced in sac-like structures called asci) show considerable size variation, typically ranging from 40 to 75 micrometres (μm) in length and 8.0 to 9.5 μm in width, though extremes from 27 to 100 μm in length and 7.2 to 11.5 μm in width have been observed. The ascospores are transversely divided by up to 15 septa (internal walls), and their length-to-width ratio ranges from 5 to 8, though ratios as low as 3.4 and as high as 9.7 have been recorded.

== Habitat and distribution ==
Allographa leptospora was first documented in Europe in 2016, when it was discovered in Portugal. Prior to this finding, the species was only known from tropical regions, with its type locality in Thailand. The European specimens were collected from two distinct regions in Portugal with suitable microclimates: the Sintra Mountains and the Planalto das Cezaredas. In the Serra de Sintra, a granitic mountain range near Lisbon, the lichen was found growing in oak forests at elevations between 430 and 440 metres. In the Planalto das Cezaredas, a plateau in the western region of Portugal spanning four counties (Bombarral, Lourinhã, Óbidos and Peniche), specimens were collected in Quercus coccifera habitats at about 150 metres elevation.

Researchers have suggested that the presence of this predominantly tropical species in Portugal may be linked to climate change, as Portugal's climate has become notably wetter and warmer in recent decades. This ecological shift potentially created suitable conditions for tropical lichen species to establish in certain European microclimates. The discovery was part of a broader finding of seven tropical Graphis (and Allographis) species new to Europe, doubling the number of Graphis species known from the continent at the time.

== See also ==
- List of Allographa species
