= Allographa itatiaiensis =

Scientific classification
- Kingdom: Fungi
- Division: Ascomycota
- Class: Lecanoromycetes
- Order: Graphidales
- Family: Graphidaceae
- Genus: Allographa
- Species: A. itatiaiensis

Binomial name
- Allographa itatiaiensis (Nelsen, Lücking & Spielmann) Lücking & Kalb (2018)

Species of lichen-forming fungus

Allographa itatiaiensis is a little-known species of lichen-forming fungus in the family Graphidaceae. Originally described in 2011 as a member of the genus Graphis, it was later transferred to Allographa in 2018 during a major reorganization of script lichen genera. The species forms thin, greenish-grey crusts on tree bark, distinguished by small spherical outgrowths and star-shaped clusters of slender, branching fruiting bodies. It is known only from humid Atlantic Forest environments in southeastern Brazil, where it grows on tree bark in shaded, moist conditions.

== Taxonomy ==
Allographa itatiaiensis was described in 2011 by Matthew Nelsen, Robert Lücking, and Adriano Spielmann from material gathered in the Itatiaia National Park, southeastern Brazil. It was originally classified in the large tropical genus Graphis, whose species are recognised by their elongated, usually black fruit-bodies (lirellae). The new taxon had previously been confused with G. rhizicola (now Allographa rhizicola), but careful comparison showed two stable differences: the Brazilian material produces minute isidioid (isidia-like) outgrowths on the thallus surface and its lirellae branch in a stellate (asteroid) pattern and cluster into small pseudostromata. These features, together with spore measurements and internal anatomy, supported recognition of the taxon at species rank. The epithet refers to the type locality in the Serra do Itatiaia.

The species was transferred by Lücking and Klaus Kalb to the genus Allographa in 2018 as part of a major reorganization of the script lichen genera Graphis and Hemithecium.

== Description ==
The lichen forms a thin, bark-dwelling crust up to about 7 cm across and 30–70 micrometres (μm) thick. Its surface ranges from smooth to slightly warted and is greenish-grey, dotted with spherical to irregular isidioid projections 50–100 μm wide that serve as vegetative propagules. In section the upper cortex is tough and cartilage-like; beneath it lies an irregular zone of the orange Trentepohlia alga interspersed with large crystal clusters.

Fruiting bodies are lirellae that appear as slender, flexuous fissures 1–3 mm long and 0.3–0.5 mm wide. They branch repeatedly so that many radiate from a centre and form star-shaped groups partly embedded in the thallus. A thick rim of thallus tissue almost covers the darker lips (labia), leaving only the upper edge exposed, so the lirellae stand out as pale, raised lines against the darker crust. Internally the wall (excipulum) is completely carbonised and 50–100 μm thick; the clear hymenium is 150–200 μm tall and capped by a finely granular, olive-brown epithecium. Each ascus contains two to four colourless ascospores that are oblong-cylindrical, divided by 15–25 cross-walls, and measure 100–150 × 14–17 μm; a thin gelatinous cap is present at each end. No secondary metabolites (lichen products) were detected by thin-layer chromatography.

== Habitat and distribution ==
Graphis itatiaiensis is known only from a few collections in lower montane Atlantic Forest within Itatiaia National Park, Minas Gerais. It was found on tree bark along the Estrada das Prateleiras. The humid, subtropical environment of this forest provides the shaded, persistently moist microhabitat favoured by many members of the genus.
