= Allographa kamojangensis =

Scientific classification
- Kingdom: Fungi
- Division: Ascomycota
- Class: Lecanoromycetes
- Order: Graphidales
- Family: Graphidaceae
- Genus: Allographa
- Species: A. kamojangensis

Binomial name
- Allographa kamojangensis Jatnika, Noer & Lücking (2019)
- Holotype: Kamojang, Indonesia

Species of lichen-forming fungus

Allographa kamojangensis is a species of script lichen in the family Graphidaceae. It was formally described in 2019 from specimens collected on jackfruit trees in the Kamojang geothermal field area of West Java, Indonesia. The lichen is characterised by its white-grey crusty thallus and prominent, irregularly branched fruiting bodies (lirellae) with black lips dusted with distinctive yellow-orange pigment. The species was first recognised from a photograph posted to a social media group, and has been cited as an example of the growing role of citizen science in contemporary lichen taxonomy.

== Taxonomy ==
Allographa kamojangensis was described in 2019 by Muhammad Jatnika, Iin Noer, and Robert Lücking from material collected in West Java, Indonesia. The holotype was gathered at Kamojang on the bark and twig of Artocarpus heterophyllus. The species was first recognised from a photograph posted to the Facebook group "Lichens Connecting People", and subsequent study confirmed it as distinct. This episode has been cited as evidence of the growing role of social media and citizen science observations in contemporary taxonomy and biodiversity research. The epithet refers to the Kamojang geothermal field, a well-known site in West Java.

== Description ==
The thallus is corticolous (bark-dwelling) and epiperidermal (sitting on the bark surface, not immersed in it), forming a continuous, uneven, white-grey crust up to about 6 cm across; a prothallus was not observed. In section the thallus is 100–200 μm thick, with a prosoplectenchymatous cortex (20–30 μm) over a photobiont layer (50–70 μm) that is cloudy with numerous small crystals.

Ascomata (fruiting bodies) are lirellate, irregularly branched and prominent, typically 2–4 mm long, 0.3–0.4 mm wide and 0.1–0.2 mm high. The disc is concealed; the labia are initially entire but can become striate with age, apically exposed and black, and laterally dusted with a yellow-orange pruina. Sections show a carbonised (blackened and charcoal-like) excipulum. No secondary metabolites were detected in the thallus by thin-layer chromatography, but the lirellae bear an orange anthraquinone pigment that in section reacts K+ (immediately purple-violet).

Ascospores number eight per ascus, are hyaline and I+ (violet-blue), transversely septate with 13–15 septa, and measure 100–140 × 20–25 μm (about 4–6 times as long as wide). The septa are thickened and the lumina are lens-shaped to rectangular.

=== Similar species ===
Within Allographa, it belongs to the group with pigmented lirellae. It differs from the Neotropical species A. firferi in having much larger ascospores and an orange pruina that reacts K+ (immediately purple-violet), and from A. lutea in its completely carbonised excipulum and larger spores. It also resembles A. chrysocarpa and A. ochracea in having carbonised lirellae with orange K+ (purple-violet) pruina, but it can be separated by its transversely septate (not muriform) ascospores and by spore dimensions. A world key places A. kamojangensis among the eastern Palaeotropical taxa with this pigment character.

== Habitat and distribution ==
The type material came from semi-exposed trees in a crop plantation at Kamojang, West Java, an area whose original broadleaf evergreen forest has been much reduced. The authors suggest the species is probably more frequent in the upper canopy of remnant forest in the region. At the time of description it was known from Java and treated as an eastern Palaeotropical member of the pigmented-lirellae group within Allographa.

== See also ==
- List of Allographa species
