= Allographa lichexanthonica =

Scientific classification
- Kingdom: Fungi
- Division: Ascomycota
- Class: Lecanoromycetes
- Order: Graphidales
- Family: Graphidaceae
- Genus: Allographa
- Species: A. lichexanthonica

Binomial name
- Allographa lichexanthonica Lücking, N.Marín & B.Moncada (2023)
- Type locality: Corregimiento of Chorrera, Colombia

Species of lichen-forming fungus

Allographa lichexanthonica is a species of crustose lichen-forming fungus in the family Graphidaceae. It is a white, bark-dwelling lichen with wavy, prominently raised, slit-like fruiting bodies, known only from lowland forest in the Colombian Amazon. The species was described in 2023 and is named for its content of lichexanthone, which causes the thallus to fluoresce yellow under ultraviolet light.

== Taxonomy ==
Allographa lichexanthonica was described as a new species in 2023 by Robert Lücking, Norida Lucia Marín-Canchala, and Bibiana Moncada. The species epithet refers to lichexanthone, the main secondary metabolite detected in the lichen.

== Description ==
The body (thallus) is crust-forming (crustose) and grows on bark on tree trunks, forming patches up to 3 cm (1.2 in) across. It is white and opaque, with a smooth to uneven surface. No visible border zone (prothallus) is usually present, though a thin, irregular black line may appear where the thallus meets neighboring lichens. In cross-section, the thallus is 50–70 μm thick and includes a thin outer skin (cortex), a compact algal layer, and a thin inner tissue (medulla) with small gray crystals. The algal partner (photobiont) is the green alga Trentepohlia.

The slit-like fruiting bodies (lirellae) are wavy (flexuose) and irregularly branched, prominently raised, and 3–7 mm long by 0.2–0.25 mm wide, with the inner disc hidden from view. The lips (labia) are smooth-edged and black, with a thin frosting (pruina) along the slit. The outer wall (excipulum) is completely blackened (carbonized). The spore-bearing layer (hymenium) is clear and 120–150 μm high. Each ascus contains eight colorless ascospores that are divided into 6 cells (5-septate) and measure 18–25 × 6–7 μm. They stain violet-blue with iodine (I+ violet-blue). The species contains lichexanthone; as a consequence, the thallus fluoresces yellow under ultraviolet light, sometimes in patches.

== Habitat and distribution ==
The species is known only from the type locality in the Colombian department of Amazonas, where it was collected at 161 m (528 ft) elevation on decaying wood near the left margin of the Igara Paraná River. It was suggested to be adapted to more exposed, well-lit habitats.

== See also ==
- List of Allographa species
