= Sarcographina =

Scientific classification
- Domain: Eukaryota
- Kingdom: Fungi
- Division: Ascomycota
- Class: Lecanoromycetes
- Order: Graphidales
- Family: Graphidaceae
- Genus: Sarcographina; Müll.Arg. (1887)

Type species
- Sarcographina cyclospora Müll.Arg. (1887)

Species
- S. contortuplicata S. cyclospora S. farinulenta S. heterospora S. maculata S. sandwicensis

Genus of lichen-forming fungi

Sarcographina is a genus of script lichens in the family Graphidaceae. It comprises six species. Established in 1887 by the Swiss lichenologist Johannes Müller Argoviensis, these bark-dwelling lichens are distinguished by their star-burst colonies of short, curved fruiting structures with jet-black borders and ascospores that stain violet when treated with iodine. Found in humid tropical and warm temperate forests worldwide, they serve as indicators of undisturbed woodland habitats due to their sensitivity to canopy opening and drought.

== Taxonomy ==
The genus was circumscribed by the Swiss lichenologist Johannes Müller Argoviensis in 1887, with Sarcographina cyclospora assigned as the type species. In his original description, Müller characterised Sarcographina by its crustaceous thallus and chrome-coloured photobiont, with lirellae densely aggregated in spot-like stromata that are immersed in the thallus surface. He distinguished the genus from Sarcographa by noting that the lirellae are arranged in dense clusters rather than radiating patterns, and described the perithecium as having its own distinct boundary that is brownish-black and internally indistinct. Müller noted the linear asci contain simple paraphyses and both dark and pale ascospores. The genus name reflects its close relationship to Sarcographa, with the suffix "-ina" indicating a diminutive or related form.

== Description ==
Sarcographina forms a smooth, chalk-white to pale grey crust (thallus) that grows flush with the bark and lacks a true cortex. Its fruit bodies are arranged in neat, star-burst colonies of short, curved lirellae whose walls are jet-black and wholly carbonised. A colourless to pale brown excipulum lines each slit, overhung by a yellow-brown epithecium often dusted with a fine pruina. The hymenium is densely inspersed with oil droplets, and the thin-walled Graphis-type asci contain eight hyaline ascospores that are relatively small (roughly 15–35 × 5–10 μm), transversely 3–9-septate, and stain deep violet in iodine (I+). Many species synthesise the ultraviolet-fluorescent pigment lichexanthone, together with traces of norstictic acid or stictic acid, giving the discs a dull ochre tint in reflected light and a bright yellow glow under long-wave ultraviolet.

The combination of rosette-forming lirellae, a strongly inspersed hymenium and I+ (violet), small-segmented spores separates Sarcographina from its sister genus Sarcographa, whose hymenium is clear and whose larger spores remain iodine-negative. Other script lichens with carbonised margins—such as Glyphis, Hemithecium and Redingeria—lack the star-burst architecture, the persistent inspersion or the lichexanthone fluorescence that diagnose Sarcographina.

== Ecology ==
The genus has a pantropical to warm-temperate distribution, with records from lowland Amazonian rainforest, West-Central African evergreen stands, Indo-Malayan dipterocarp forest and humid coastal woodlands of Queensland. All known species are corticolous, colonising shaded boles and large branches where high ambient humidity prevails; some taxa, particularly those rich in lichexanthone, also tolerate intermittent sunflecks on mangrove trunks and creek bank trees. Field surveys show that populations decline rapidly after canopy opening or prolonged desiccation, so the presence of Sarcographina is a practical indicator of long-established, moisture-rich woodland habitat.

== Species ==
Species Fungorum (in the Catalogue of Life) accepts six species of Sarcographina:

- Sarcographina contortuplicata Müll.Arg. (1891)
- Sarcographina cyclospora Müll.Arg. (1887)
- Sarcographina farinulenta Zahlbr. (1928)
- Sarcographina heterospora (Nyl.) Z.F.Jia & Lücking (2017)
- Sarcographina maculata Kr.P.Singh & G.P.Sinha (1994)
- Sarcographina sandwicensis Zahlbr. (1912)
