= Thalloloma janeirense =

Scientific classification
- Domain: Eukaryota
- Kingdom: Fungi
- Division: Ascomycota
- Class: Lecanoromycetes
- Order: Graphidales
- Family: Graphidaceae
- Genus: Thalloloma
- Species: T. janeirense

Binomial name
- Thalloloma janeirense Staiger (2002)

Species of lichen

Thalloloma janeirense is a rare species of corticolous lichen in the family Graphidaceae. It has been reported from Brazil, Fiji, the Philippines and the Seychelles.
