= Pallidogramme parvicarpa =

Scientific classification
- Kingdom: Fungi
- Division: Ascomycota
- Class: Lecanoromycetes
- Order: Graphidales
- Family: Graphidaceae
- Genus: Pallidogramme
- Species: P. parvicarpa

Binomial name
- Pallidogramme parvicarpa (B.O.Sharma & Khadilkar) Lücking (2014)

Synonyms
- Graphis parvicarpa B.O.Sharma & Khadilkar (2011)

Species of lichen-forming fungus

Pallidogramme parvicarpa is a species of bark-dwelling script lichen in the family Graphidaceae. It was described as a new species in 2011 by Bharati Sharma and Pradnya Khadilkar from collections made in the Nandi Hills of Karnataka, India, where it grows in semi-evergreen forests. The species was first described as a member of the genus Graphis, but reclassified into Pallidogramme by Robert Lücking in 2014. Characteristics of Pallidogramme parvicarpa include the grooves around the tissue supporting the fruiting bodies (the exciple), a spore-bearing layer hymenium containing oil droplets, ascospores divided into many small chambers (muriform), and the presence of norstictic acid in the thallus.
