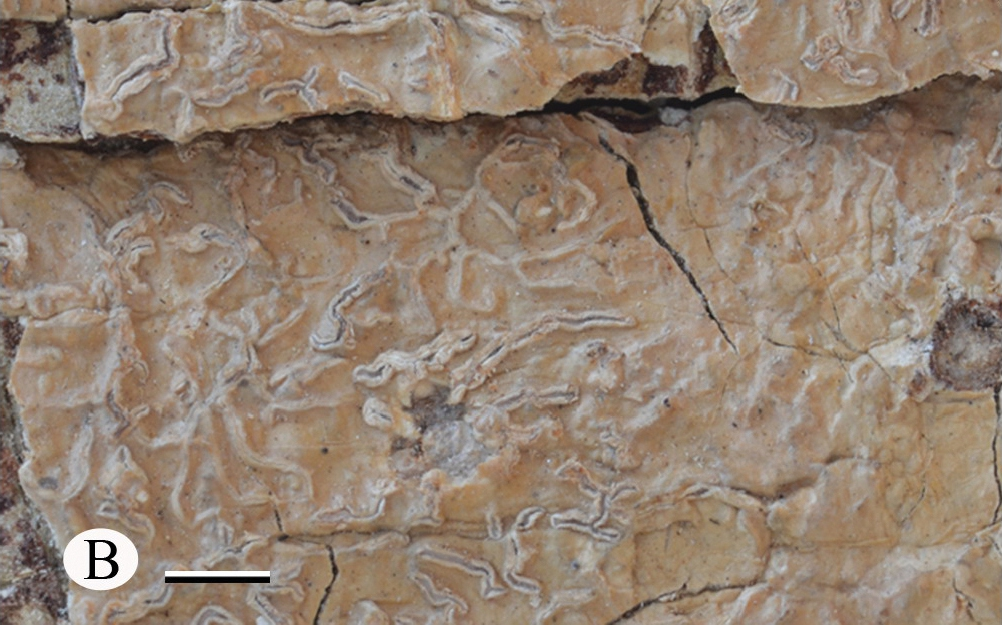
- Platythecium pyrrhochroum; scale bar = 1 mm

Scientific classification
- Domain: Eukaryota
- Kingdom: Fungi
- Division: Ascomycota
- Class: Lecanoromycetes
- Order: Graphidales
- Family: Graphidaceae
- Genus: Platythecium; Staiger (2002)

Type species
- Platythecium grammitis (Fée) Staiger (2002)

= Platythecium =

Genus of lichen-forming fungi

Platythecium is a genus of lichen-forming fungi in the family Graphidaceae. It comprises 25 species. Described in 2002 by the German lichenologist Bettina Staiger, these bark-dwelling lichens are found in humid, shaded forests across tropical and warm temperate regions worldwide. They are characterized by their flattened, plate-like fruiting structures with completely blackened walls and are sensitive to forest disturbance, making their presence an indicator of long-established woodland conditions.

== Taxonomy ==
The genus was circumscribed in 2002 by the German lichenologist Bettina Staiger in her 2002 monographic treatment of the family Graphidaceae. Platythecium grammitis was assigned as the type species.

== Description ==
Platythecium produces a smooth, pale grey-green to yellow-olive crust (thallus) that embeds directly in the bark and lacks a true cortex. Its fruit bodies are short to elongate lirellae whose slate-black walls are completely carbonised; the narrow slit is usually covered at first by a thin thalline veil that later breaks to reveal a flat, often faintly white-pruinose disc. Beneath the margin a colourless to pale brown excipulum lines a clear, non-inspersed hymenium traversed by smooth paraphyses. Eight hyaline ascospores develop in each Graphis-type ascus; they become conspicuously muriform—divided by many transverse and a few longitudinal septa—but remain iodine-negative (I–) and generally measure 25–60 × 8–15 μm. Most species are chemically inert or contain only low amounts of stictic acid-series depsidones, a contrast to many anthraquinone-rich script lichens.

The flattened, plate-like lirellae and pale excipulum distinguish Platythecium from superficially similar genera. In Glyphis and Hemithecium the discs stay narrow and the walls alone form the exposed edge, whereas Platygramme displays broader shields with a persistent thalline rim, and Kalbographa is set apart by its vivid orange to brick-red epithecium produced by anthraquinones.

== Ecology ==
The genus is pantropical to warm-temperate in distribution, occurring on shaded boles and large branches in mature evergreen forests from Amazonia and West-Central Africa to Southeast Asia, northern Australia and the Atlantic Plain of North America. All species are corticolous and appear sensitive to prolonged canopy opening: they decline sharply after logging or edge creation, so their presence is a convenient field signal of long-established, humid woodland conditions.

== Species ==
As of June 2025, Species Fungorum (in the Catalogue of Life) accept 25 species of Platythecium.

- Platythecium acutisporum Staiger (2002)
- Platythecium albolabiatum (Patw. & C.R.Kulk.) A.W.Archer (2007)
- Platythecium allosporellum (Nyl.) Staiger (2002)
- Platythecium annonacea (Müll.Arg.) A.W.Archer (2007)
- Platythecium biseptatum M.Cáceres, Aptroot & Lücking (2014)
- Platythecium commiscens Adaw. & Makhija (2005)
- Platythecium cristobalense (A.W.Archer) A.W.Archer (2007)
- Platythecium dimorphodes (Nyl.) Staiger (2002)
- Platythecium floridanum (Tuck.) Lendemer (2008)
- Platythecium grammitis (Fée) Staiger (2002)
- Platythecium hypoleptum (Nyl.) M.Nakan. & Kashiw. (2003)
- Platythecium inspersum Staiger (2002)
- Platythecium intortula (Stirt.) M.Nakan. & Kashiw. (2003)
- Platythecium leiogramma (Nyl.) Staiger (2002)
- Platythecium maximum (Groenh.) Z.F.Jia & Lücking (2017)
- Platythecium nothofagi (A.W.Archer) A.W.Archer (2009)
- Platythecium pertenellum (Stirt.) A.W.Archer (2005)
- Platythecium pyrrhochroum (Mont. & Bosch) Z.F.Jia & Lücking (2017)
- Platythecium serpentinellum (Nyl.) Staiger (2002)
- Platythecium seychellense G.Neuwirth, Aptroot & Stock.-Wörg. (2017)
- Platythecium sphaerosporellum (Nyl.) Staiger (2002)
- Platythecium sripadakandense Weerakoon, Lücking & Lumbsch (2014) – Sri Lanka
- Platythecium streimannii A.W.Archer (2009)
- Platythecium suberythrellum (M.Wirth & Hale) Staiger & Kalb (2004)
- Platythecium verrucoareolatum Adaw. & Makhija (2005)
