= Thalloloma rubromarginatum =

Scientific classification
- Domain: Eukaryota
- Kingdom: Fungi
- Division: Ascomycota
- Class: Lecanoromycetes
- Order: Graphidales
- Family: Graphidaceae
- Genus: Thalloloma
- Species: T. rubromarginatum

Binomial name
- Thalloloma rubromarginatum Merc.-Díaz, Lücking & Parnmen (2014)

Species of lichen

Thalloloma rubromarginatum is a little-known species of corticolous (bark-dwelling) script lichen in the family Graphidaceae. This lichen stands out from its counterparts within its genus, most notably Thalloloma haemographum, due to its corticate thallus and the presence of norstictic acid. Thalloloma rubromarginatum is found in the Sierra palm forests of Puerto Rico.

== Taxonomy ==
Thalloloma rubromarginatum was first described and named in 2014 by lichenologists Joel Mercado-Díaz, Robert Lücking, and Sittiporn Parnmen. The epithet rubromarginatum is a reference to the bright red margins of the lirellae. The type specimen was found by the first author in the Barrio Jiménez area (Río Grande, Puerto Rico), on the trunk of a Cecropia peltata tree, at an altitude of 917 m (3,009 ft).

== Description ==
The thallus of Thalloloma rubromarginatum adheres to tree bark and can reach up to 5 cm (2 in) in diameter. The surface of the thallus is smooth, shiny, and white. The photobiont (the photosynthesising partner in the lichen symbiosis), Trentepohlia, is characterised by rounded to irregularly shaped, olive-green cells; these green algal cells occur in a photobiont layer that is 20–30 μm thick. The medulla of the lichen is 70–90 μm thick, and encrusted with crystals of calcium oxalate. The ascomata are lirellate, meaning they are elongated and slit-like, with a purplish-brown disc and a distinct, bright red margin. The ascospores are hyaline, or glass-like, and ellipsoid in shape, with dimensions of 15–20 by 6–8 μm. They are somewhat muriform, and have 3–5 transverse and 0–1 longitudinal septa per segment.

== Similar species ==
Thalloloma rubromarginatum bears a resemblance to Thalloloma haemographum, particularly in terms of their brownish discs with bright red margins and muriform ascospores. However, T. rubromarginatum is unique in genus Thalloloma due to its production of norstictic acid and the presence of a distinct cortex. T. haemographum, in contrast, lacks these features and also has larger ascospores.

== Habitat and distribution ==
This species lives in the Sierra palm forest within El Yunque National Forest, Puerto Rico. It has been observed growing on the upper branches of a fallen Cecropia peltata tree, which suggests it might favour such environments.
