= Platythecium verrucoareolatum =

Scientific classification
- Kingdom: Fungi
- Division: Ascomycota
- Class: Lecanoromycetes
- Order: Graphidales
- Family: Graphidaceae
- Genus: Platythecium
- Species: P. verrucoareolatum

Binomial name
- Platythecium verrucoareolatum Adaw. & Makhija (2005)

Species of lichen

Platythecium verrucoareolatum is a species of corticolous (bark-dwelling) script lichen in the family Graphidaceae. Found in India, it was formally described as a new species in 2005 by Bharati Adawadkar and Urmila Vasudev Makhija. The type specimen was collected from a tropical montane forest in Kollaimalai (Tamil Nadu). The lichen has a whitish or buff-coloured thallus that is verrucose, cracked, and areolate. The species epithet, which combines the Latin areolatus (marked out into small, angular sections) and verrucosus (warty), refers to these characteristic features. The ascomata are in the form of completely immersed lirellae that measure 0.4–0.8 mm long and occur in scattered groups.

Platythecium verrucoareolatum contains several lichen products: consalazinic acid, hypostictic acid, norstictic acid, and lichexanthone; the latter substance causes the thallus of the lichen to fluoresce a yellow colour when lit with a long-wavelength UV light. This is one character that distinguishes the species from the morphologically similar Platythecium occultum.
