= Hemithecium staigerae =

Scientific classification
- Kingdom: Fungi
- Division: Ascomycota
- Class: Lecanoromycetes
- Order: Graphidales
- Family: Graphidaceae
- Genus: Hemithecium
- Species: H. staigerae

Binomial name
- Hemithecium staigerae Adaw. & Makhija (2005)

Species of lichen-forming fungus

Hemithecium staigerae is a species of crustose lichen-forming fungus in the family Graphidaceae, described from India in 2005 by Bharati Adawadkar and Urmila Makhija. The species was named in honour of the lichenologist Bettina Staiger, and its holotype was collected in Tamil Nadu (Kodaikanal, Silver Cascade) in January 1975. Robert Lücking and Klaus Kalb later opined that the lichen was "likely a species of Diorygma".

Hemithecium staigerae has a thick, cracked thallus that is white with a greenish tinge and has a thin black hypothallus. The lirellae are delicate, the same colour as the thallus, about 0.5–3 mm long, simple to branched, scattered, and immersed in the thallus, with acute to rounded ends. Ascospores are fusiform to ellipsoidal, 5–7-trans-septate, and measure 21–29 × 4–5 μm.

In spot tests the thallus is K+ (yellow) and P+ (orange), and the lichen products reported include testacein A, testacein B, and consalazinic acid. The original description states that it is not readily comparable with other known Hemithecium species, separating it by its greenish white, farinaceous (mealy) thallus, short immersed lirellae, an exciple that is entire to sometimes internally grooved (striate), and its secondary chemistry. Collections cited in the protologue are from tropical montane forest in Tamil Nadu (Kodaikanal area).
