= Hemithecium duomurisporum =

Scientific classification
- Kingdom: Fungi
- Division: Ascomycota
- Class: Lecanoromycetes
- Order: Graphidales
- Family: Graphidaceae
- Genus: Hemithecium
- Species: H. duomurisporum

Binomial name
- Hemithecium duomurisporum Z.F.Jia (2011)

Species of lichen-forming fungus

Hemithecium duomurisporum is a species of bark-dwelling crustose lichen in the family Graphidaceae. Found in Hainan, China, it was formally described as a new species in 2011 by Ze-Feng Jia.
