= Platythecium commiscens =

Scientific classification
- Kingdom: Fungi
- Division: Ascomycota
- Class: Lecanoromycetes
- Order: Graphidales
- Family: Graphidaceae
- Genus: Platythecium
- Species: P. commiscens

Binomial name
- Platythecium commiscens Adaw. & Makhija (2005)

Species of lichen

Platythecium commiscens is a species of corticolous (bark-dwelling) script lichen in the family Graphidaceae. Found in India, it was formally described as a new species in 2005 by Bharati Adawadkar and Urmila Vasudev Makhija. The type specimen was collected from Kollaimalai (Tamil Nadu). The lichen has a whitish-green to greenish coloured thallus that is encircled by a thin black prothallus. The ascomata are in the form of short, highly branched lirellae that are immersed in the thallus; the lirellae are intermingled and crowded together. The species epithet, derived from the Latin commiscens ("intermingling"), refers to this characteristic feature.

Platythecium commiscens contains lichexanthone, a lichen product that causes the thallus of the lichen to fluoresce a yellow colour when lit with a long-wavelength UV light. It is this feature that distinguishes the species from the morphologically similar Platythecium parvicarpum.
