= Pallidogramme =

Scientific classification
- Domain: Eukaryota
- Kingdom: Fungi
- Division: Ascomycota
- Class: Lecanoromycetes
- Order: Graphidales
- Family: Graphidaceae
- Genus: Pallidogramme; Staiger, Kalb & Lücking (2008)

Synonyms
- Hemithecium subgen. Leucogramma Staiger (2002)

Genus of lichens

Pallidogramme is a genus of lichen-forming fungi in the family Graphidaceae. It has 8 species of corticolous (bark-dwelling), crustose lichens.

== Taxonomy ==
Pallidogramme was proposed in 2008 by the lichenologists Bettina Staiger, Klaus Kalb, and Robert Lücking, as a replacement name for Leucogramma A.Massal. The justification for this change originated from the previously established Hemithecium subgen. Leucogramma by Staiger in 2002. There was, however, a pre-existing generic name, Leucogramma A.Massal., which was based on the same species as Staiger's subgenus, Hemithecium chrysenteron. Both of these names were unusable at the genus level due to their homonymy with Leucogramma G.Mey. a name with unknown taxonomic affinity. As a result, a new name was deemed necessary to avoid confusion and maintain nomenclatural clarity.

== Description ==
The defining features of genus Pallidogramme include a crust-like, bark-dwelling thallus, fully formed labia, a predominantly inspersed hymenium, and an exciple which is non-carbonized, displaying a spectrum of colours from pale yellowish-brown to reddish-brown, accompanied by internal striations. Moreover, it possesses ascospores that range in colour from pale brown to brown, and that turn reddish-brown when stained with iodine (I+).

== Species ==
- Pallidogramme awasthii (Patw. & C.R.Kulk.) Kr.P.Singh & Pushpi Singh (2017)
- Pallidogramme canarensis (Patw. & C.R.Kulk.) Pushpi Singh & Kr.P.Singh (2020)
- Pallidogramme chapadana (Redinger) Staiger, Kalb & Lücking (2008)
- Pallidogramme chlorocarpoides (Nyl.) Staiger, Kalb & Lücking (2008)
- Pallidogramme chrysenteron (Mont.) Staiger, Kalb & Lücking (2008)
- Pallidogramme chrysentherodes (Nyl.) Kr.P.Singh & Swarnal. (2008)
- Pallidogramme divaricoides (Räsänen) Pushpi Singh & Kr.P.Singh (2017)
- Pallidogramme parvicarpa (B.O.Sharma & Khadilkar) Lücking (2014)

Pallidogramme indica was proposed as a new species from India in 2009, but it was not published validly; a similar situation occurs with the proposed Pallidogramme undulatolirellata A.Dube & Makhija (2009), and Pallidogramme bengalensis B.O.Sharma & Khadilkar (2011).

Former Pallidogramme species:

- Pallidogramme commutabilis (Kremp.) Chitale & Makhija (2009) is now Platygramme commutabilis
- Pallidogramme montiscalvi (A.W.Archer) A.W.Archer (2009) is now Phaeographina montiscalvi
- Pallidogramme nilgiriensis (Adaw. & Makhija) Kr.P.Singh & Swarnal. (2008) is now Graphis nilgiriensis.
