= Kabu, Along =

Coordinates: 28.190°N 94.767°E

Kabu is a village in the West Siang district of Arunachal Pradesh, India, located near the town of Aalo (formerly known as Along), at the scenic confluence of the Yomgo (or Siyom) and Sipu rivers. Primarily inhabited by the indigenous Galo people, the area is rich in natural beauty and culture, including the traditional Donyi-Polo faith which worships the sun (Donyi) and moon (Polo). The region is known for its hospitality and offers opportunities for tourism, with sights such as a traditional hanging bridge and natural scenery.
