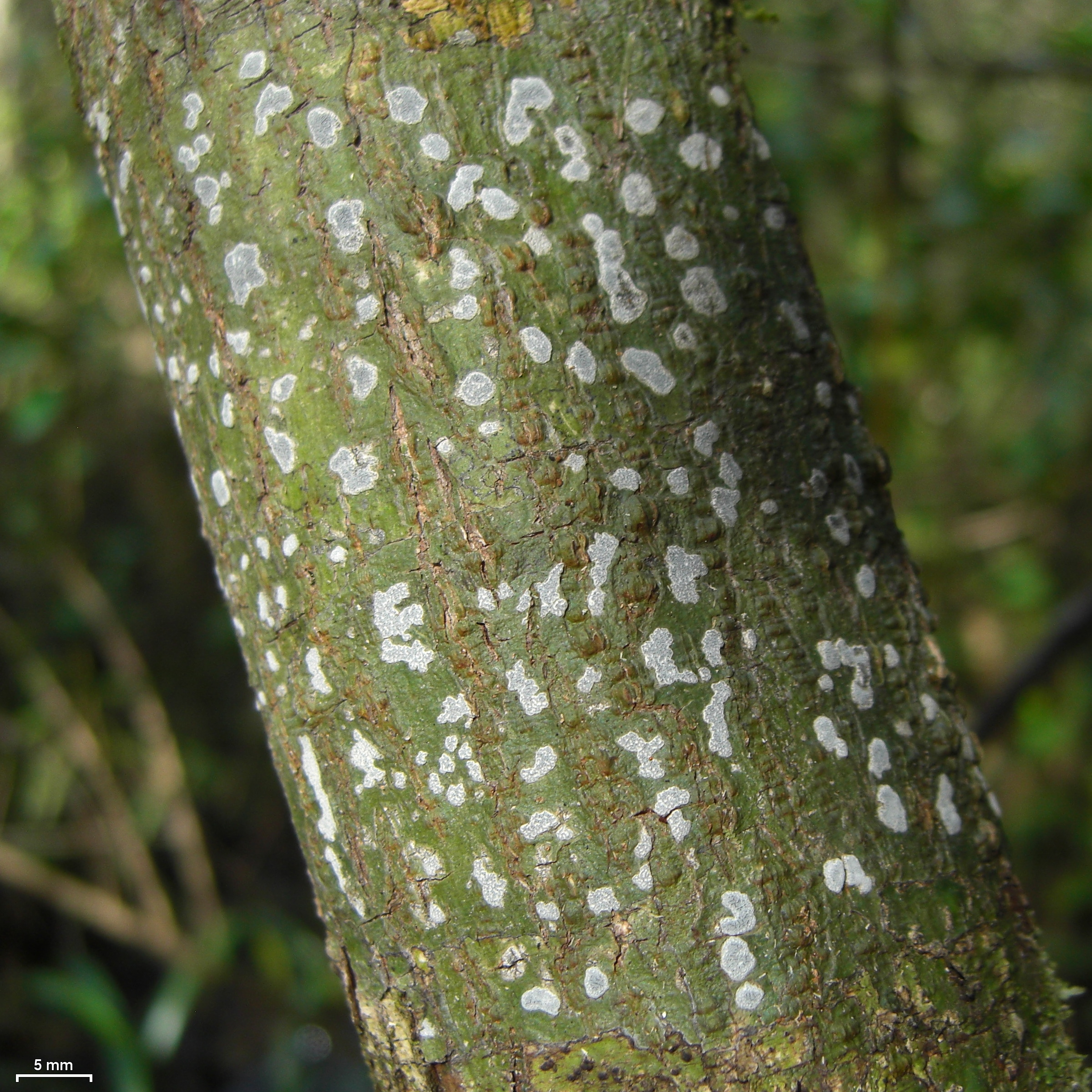
- Sarcographa labyrinthica

Scientific classification
- Kingdom: Fungi
- Division: Ascomycota
- Class: Lecanoromycetes
- Order: Graphidales
- Family: Graphidaceae
- Genus: Sarcographa; Fée (1825)

Type species
- Sarcographa cinchonarum Fée (1825)

Synonyms
- Actinoglyphis Mont. (1856); Asterisca G.Mey. (1825); Flegographa A.Massal. (1860); Medusula Eschw. (1824); Sarcographomyces Cif. & Tomas. (1953)

= Sarcographa =

Genus of lichen-forming fungi

Sarcographa is a genus of lichen-forming fungi in the family Graphidaceae. Established in 1825 by the French botanist Antoine Laurent Apollinaire Fée, the genus contains 22 species that are recognised by their distinctive star-shaped colonies of radiating, script-like fruiting structures with black borders. These bark-dwelling lichens are found in humid tropical and warm temperate forests worldwide and serve as indicators of undisturbed woodland, as they quickly decline when forest canopy is opened or disturbed.

== Taxonomy ==
The genus was circumscribed by the French botanist Antoine Laurent Apollinaire Fée in 1825. In his original description, Fée characterised the genus by its labyrinthine fruiting bodies (lirellae) that are sunken into a fleshy support structure, with the disc initially covered by a powdery substance (pruina) and containing an elongated, branched nucleus with irregular striations. He initially described three species: S. cinchonarium (the type species) from the bark of cinchona trees, S. tigrina with its yellowish, thick, and uneven thallus, and S. cascarillae distinguished by its pale yellowish, membranous, thick, and somewhat uneven thallus. Fée noted that the lirellae are partially embedded in a fleshy, whitish, rather thick support structure that serves as a kind of universal receptacle, and emphasised that this support structure often becomes bifurcated at the extremities of the lirellae.

== Description ==
Sarcographa develops a thin, chalk-white to pale grey crust (thallus) that sits flush with the bark and lacks a true cortex. Its most conspicuous feature is a star-shaped colony of radiating lirellae: each slit is 0.5–3 mm long, commonly curved, and bordered by a completely carbonised (blackened) rim that makes the pattern stand out black against the thallus. A colourless to pale brown excipulum lines the interior, while the hymenium is usually clear and non-inspersed. The Graphis-type asci contain eight hyaline (colourless and translucent) ascospores that become prominently muriform—divided by numerous transverse and a few longitudinal septa—remain iodine-negative (I–) and typically measure 30–70 × 8–16 μm. Chemically, most species produce stictic acid or norstictic acid (occasionally together with trace protocetraric-series depsidones) which can impart a yellow-brown tinge to the disc surface.

The rosette of radiating lirellae, together with the fully carbonised margins and large I– muriform spores, separates Sarcographa from superficially similar script lichens. In Graphis and Glyphis the lirellae are scattered rather than arranged in a star-burst; Redingeria and Reimnitzia share black rims but lack the distinctive radial pattern; whereas Kalbographa differs by its bright orange anthraquinone epithecium. A closely allied genus, Sarcographina, also forms rosettes, but its smaller spores react I+ (violet) and the hymenium is densely inspersed—features absent from Sarcographa.

== Ecology ==
Sarcographa has a pantropical to warm-temperate distribution. All known species are corticolous, favouring smooth, shaded bark in humid evergreen forests from lowland Amazonia and West-Central Africa to Southeast Asia, northern Australia and the Gulf–Atlantic Coastal Plain of North America. Several species (e.g., S. colombiana) also colonise mangrove stems just above the high-tide mark, displaying a tolerance of intermittent salt spray. Because the genus declines quickly after canopy opening or repeated burning, its presence is a useful field indicator of long-standing, moisture-rich woodland habitat.

== Species ==
As of June 2025, Species Fungorum (in the Catalogue of Life) accepts 22 species of Sarcographa.

- Sarcographa astroidea (Vain.) Lücking (2019)
- Sarcographa atlantica E.L.Lima & Lücking (2019)
- Sarcographa cinchonarum Fée (1825)
- Sarcographa colliculosa (C.Knight) Zahlbr. (1923)
- Sarcographa dendroides (Leight.) Luch & Lücking (2018)
- Sarcographa fenicis (Vain.) Zahlbr. (1923)
- Sarcographa fissurinoides M.Cáceres & Lücking (2007)
- Sarcographa glyphiza (Nyl.) Kr.P.Singh & G.P.Sinha (2010)
- Sarcographa heteroclita (Mont.) Zahlbr. (1911)
- Sarcographa intricans (Nyl.) Müll.Arg. (1887)
- Sarcographa kirtoniana (Müll.Arg.) Müll.Arg. (1887)
- Sarcographa labyrinthica (Ach.) Müll.Arg. (1887)
- Sarcographa macrohydrina M.Nakan., Kashiw. & K.H.Moon (2002)
- Sarcographa maculata (A.W.Archer) Aptroot & Sparrius (2004)
- Sarcographa medusulina (Nyl.) Müll.Arg. (1887)
- Sarcographa megistocarpa (Leight.) M.Cáceres & Lücking (2012)
- Sarcographa nagalandica Kr.P.Singh & G.P.Sinha (2015)
- Sarcographa oculata Müll.Arg. (1895)
- Sarcographa praslinensis Lücking & Diederich (2017)
- Sarcographa ramificans (Kremp.) Staiger (2002)
- Sarcographa subglobosa Lücking & Diederich (2017)
- Sarcographa subtricosa (Leight.) Müll.Arg. (1887)
- Sarcographa verrucosa (Vain.) Zahlbr. (1923)
