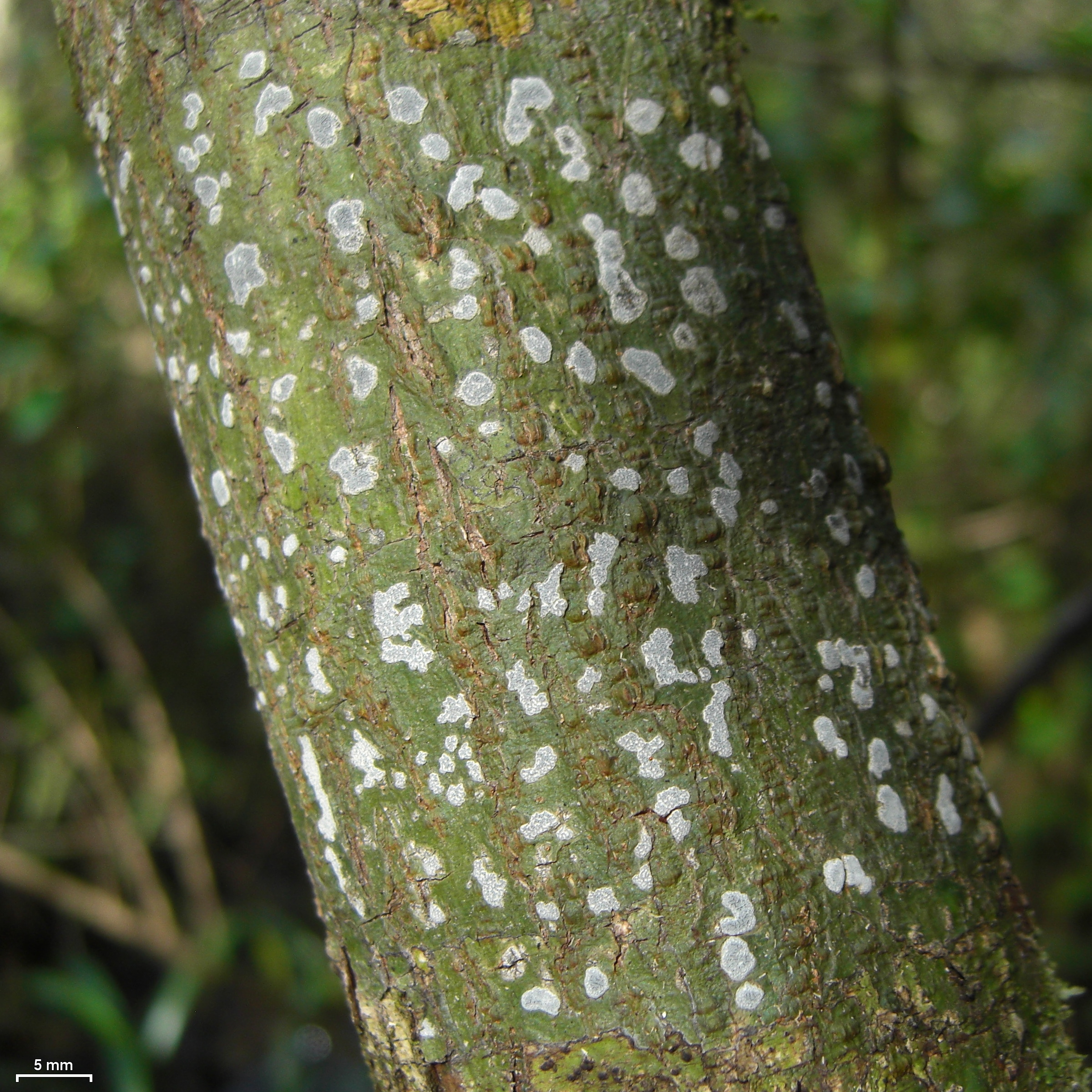

Scientific classification
- Kingdom: Fungi
- Division: Ascomycota
- Class: Lecanoromycetes
- Order: Graphidales
- Family: Graphidaceae
- Genus: Sarcographa
- Species: S. labyrinthica

Binomial name
- Sarcographa labyrinthica (Ach.) Müll.Arg. (1887)

Synonyms
- Glyphis labyrinthica Ach. (1814); Asterisca labyrinthica (Ach.) G.Mey. (1825); Graphis labyrinthica (Ach.) Vain. (1901); Sarcographa actinota F.Wilson (1891)

= Sarcographa labyrinthica =

Species of lichen

Sarcographa labyrinthica is a species of corticolous (bark-dwelling) script lichen in the family Graphidaceae. The species grows on tree bark in tropical and subtropical forests, where it creates characteristic branching, crack-like fruiting bodies (lirellae) that resemble a labyrinth. It has been recorded from diverse locations including Florida, Costa Rica, Brazil, Madagascar, and Malaysia.

== Taxonomy ==
The species was first described by Erik Acharius in 1814. Acharius introduced the name as Glyphis labyrinthica, giving a brief Latin diagnosis: a brown-olive crust with dirty-white, powdery, plano-convex wart-like apothecia, the fruiting bodies elongate and split by black fissures that almost anastomose to form a faint reticulation. He recorded it on tree bark in Guinea. He added that the species had been circulated to Heinrich Schrader and might appear in print there under the provisional name Trypethelium labyrinthiformis. Johannes Müller Argoviensis later transferred the species to Sarcographa, treating it as Sarcographa (Eusarcographa) labyrinthica and placing it in his section Eusarcographa. In doing so he contrasted it with names misapplied by Antoine Laurent Apollinaire Fée and Nylander, and characterised the species by cerebriform, intricately branched lirellae that tend to sub-anastomose and are white-velate when young; he cited Acharius's original Afzelius material from Guinea and additional bark specimens, and noted that the species is otherwise widely distributed in warm regions.

== Habitat and distribution ==
Sarcographa labyrinthica is a bark-dwelling (corticolous) lichen. Locales from which it has been recorded include Florida, Costa Rica, Brazil, Madagascar, and Malaysia.
