= Thalloloma =

Scientific classification
- Kingdom: Fungi
- Division: Ascomycota
- Class: Lecanoromycetes
- Order: Graphidales
- Family: Graphidaceae
- Genus: Thalloloma; Trevis. (1853)

Type species
- Thalloloma anguinum (Mont.) Trevis. (1853)

Genus of lichen-forming fungi

Thalloloma is a genus of lichen-forming fungi in the family Graphidaceae. Established in 1853 by the Italian botanist Vittore Trevisan de Saint-Léon, the genus comprises 20 species distinguished by their narrow script-like slits immersed in a pale crusty surface, often with dark brown or occasionally crimson-dusted fruiting structures. Found throughout tropical regions from sea level to mountain forests above 3,000 metres, these bark-dwelling lichens are more tolerant of light and moisture variation than many related species, allowing them to colonise forest edges and moderately sun-exposed locations.

== Taxonomy ==
The genus was circumscribed in 1853 by the Italian botanist Vittore Benedetto Antonio Trevisan de Saint-Léon. In his original description, Trevisan characterised Thalloloma by its immersed apothecia (fruiting bodies) that are either deformed, oblong, or lirella-like in extension, with longitudinal slits that are surrounded by a prominent thalline margin and lack a proper exciple. He noted the brownish hypothecium, eight-spored asci with enclosed paraphyses, and cylindrical, plurilocular, muriform ascospores. Trevisan described the thallus as crustaceous and uniform. In his subtribe classification of the Sclerolites, Trevisan distinguished Thalloloma from related genera: Ustalia (with pyrenoid apothecia), Sclerophyton (with lenticular apothecia), and Fissurina (with simple spores), noting that his new genus differed from Ustalia by having muriform rather than longitudinally plurilocular spores. He included several species within the genus, establishing Thalloloma anguinum (previously Ustalia anguina) as the type species.

== Description ==
Thalloloma forms a thin, pale grey-white to grey-green crust (thallus) that lacks a true cortex and is peppered with minute crystals. Its lirellae—narrow, script-like slits—are immersed in the thallus so only their fine, entire lips show; the surrounding thalline margin is usually conspicuous and may break into irregular lobes. Each slit exposes a disc dusted with dark brown or occasionally crimson pruina, the latter tint produced by the pigment isohypocrellin. Unlike many script lichens, the encircling tissue (excipulum) never becomes carbonised.

Inside, the hymenium is clear (non-inspersed) but partly amyloid, and the smooth paraphyses stand beside Graphis-type asci. Each ascus typically releases eight hyaline, distoseptate ascospores with lens-shaped compartments that stain violet in iodine (I+). Secondary chemistry is modest: most species contain lichexanthone (thallus UV+ yellow), while those with crimson discs additionally produce the anthraquinone isohypocrellin.

Species of Thalloloma can be mistaken for Diorygma—both have an ecorticate thallus and powdery discs—but Thalloloma lacks the white pruina, diverse depsidones and branched paraphyses that typify Diorygma. It also differs from brown-spored Phaeographis in its inspersion-free hymenium and hyaline, I+ spores.

== Ecology ==
The genus is pantropical in distribution, ranging from sea-level mangroves to montane forests above 3000 m in elevation. It colonises moderately exposed bark in both ever-wet and seasonally dry woodlands; its tolerance of light and moisture variation allows it to occur in gap edges and upper understory rather than the deepest shade.

== Species ==
As of June 2025, Species Fungorum (in the Catalogue of Life) accept 20 species in Thalloloma:

- Thalloloma anguinum (Mont.) Trevis. (1853)
- Thalloloma astroideum (Müll.Arg.) Staiger (2002)
- Thalloloma buriticum (Redinger) Staiger (2002)
- Thalloloma castanocarpum (A.W.Archer) A.W. Archer (2007)
- Thalloloma cinnabarinum (Fée) Staiger (2002)
- Thalloloma deplanatum (Nyl.) Staiger (2002)
- Thalloloma haemographum (Nyl.) Staiger (2002)
- Thalloloma halonatum Staiger (2002)
- Thalloloma intermedium Kalb (2020)
- Thalloloma isidiosum Staiger (2002)
- Thalloloma janeirense Staiger (2002)
- Thalloloma microsporum Z.F.Jia & J.C. Wei (2009)
- Thalloloma nitidum S.Joshi, Upreti & Hur (2018)
- Thalloloma ochroleucum Z.F.Jia (2014) – China
- Thalloloma patulum (A.W.Archer) A.W.Archer (2007)
- Thalloloma pedespulli Weerakoon, Lücking & Lumbsch (2014)
- Thalloloma pontalense Dal-Forno & Eliasaro (2010)
- Thalloloma rhodastrum (Redinger) Staiger (2002)
- Thalloloma rubromarginatum Merc.-Díaz, Lücking & Parnmen (2014)
- Thalloloma scribillans (Nyl.) Lücking (2021)
- Thalloloma subvelata (Stirt.) D.J.Galloway (2004)
- Thalloloma xanthohypoleptum Aptroot, Lücking & M.Cáceres (2024)
