= Hemithecium =

Scientific classification
- Domain: Eukaryota
- Kingdom: Fungi
- Division: Ascomycota
- Class: Lecanoromycetes
- Order: Graphidales
- Family: Graphidaceae
- Genus: Hemithecium; Trevis. (1853)

Genus of fungi

Hemithecium is a genus of lichen-forming fungi in the family Graphidaceae. These lichens form pale grey-white to yellow-olive crusts on tree bark and are characterized by straight to weakly curved fruiting bodies with charcoal-black walls that create sharp contrasts against the surface, along with distinctive spine-tipped filaments lining their interior chambers. The genus has a pantropical distribution, growing on shaded tree trunks and large branches in primary or lightly disturbed evergreen forests, where their marked sensitivity to canopy opening makes them practical indicators of intact, moisture-rich woodland habitat.

== Taxonomy ==
The genus was circumscribed by Vittore Benedetto Antonio Trevisan de Saint-Léon in 1853.

== Description ==
Hemithecium forms a pale grey-white to yellow-olive crust (thallus) that lacks a true cortex and is often dotted with minute crystals. Its lirellae are straight to weakly curved, frequently pruinose, and bordered by thick, charcoal-black walls—the excipulum is carbonised throughout, causing the script-like slits to contrast sharply with the thallus. The clear hymenium is non-inspersed and lined with short, spine-tipped periphysoids; these spinulose filaments are a hallmark of the genus. Eight hyaline ascospores develop in each Graphis-type ascus; they become transversely septate to strongly muriform, measure roughly 30–100 × 10–25 μm, remain iodine-negative (I–), and are enveloped by a thin halo that persists in potassium hydroxide solution. Most species contain norstictic acid or stictic acid, occasionally together with trace depsidones of the protocetraric series.

The coexistence of fully carbonised lirellae, spinulose periphysoids, a non-inspersed hymenium and large, I– muriform spores sets Hemithecium apart from superficially similar script lichens. In Acanthothecis the margins remain pale; Fissurina lacks spinulose filaments; and Carbacanthographis shares the black excipulum but possesses minute, often iodine-positive spores. Within Hemithecium itself two informal species groups are recognised: a "large-spored" complex (e.g., H. radicicola) with spores exceeding 60 μm long, and a "medium-spored" set (e.g., H. flabillense) with spores 30–50 ΜM long, yet both uphold the diagnostic character combination described above.

== Ecology ==
The genus is pantropical, extending from lowland Amazonian and West-African rainforests through Southeast Asian dipterocarp stands to montane cloud forests of New Guinea and north-eastern Australia. All known species are corticolous, occupying shaded trunks and large branches in primary or only lightly disturbed evergreen forest; their marked sensitivity to canopy opening means several taxa disappear rapidly after logging, making Hemithecium a practical indicator of intact, moisture-rich woodland habitat.

== Species ==
As of June 2025, Species Fungorum (in the Catalogue of Life) accepts 22 species of Hemithecium.

- Hemithecium alboglaucum (Vain.) A.W.Archer (2007)
- Hemithecium amboliense Makhija & Dube (2005)
- Hemithecium andamanicum (Makhija, Adaw. & Patw.) B.O.Sharma & Khadilkar (2012)
- Hemithecium argopholis (C.Knight ex Müll. Arg.) A.W.Archer (2005)
- Hemithecium canlaonense (Vain.) A.W.Archer (2007)
- Hemithecium duomurisporum Z.F.Jia (2011)
- Hemithecium endofuscum (M.Nakan.) M.Nakan. & Kashiw. (2003)
- Hemithecium flavoalbum (Makhija, Adaw. & Patw.) B.O.Sharma & Khadilkar (2012)
- Hemithecium flexile (Makhija, Adaw. & Patw.) B.O.Sharma & Khadilkar (2012)
- Hemithecium fulvescens Adaw. & Makhija (2005)
- Hemithecium himalayanum Jagad.Ram & G.P.Sinha (2009)
- Hemithecium kodayarense B.O.Sharma & Khadilkar (2012)
- Hemithecium lamii (Redinger) V.P.Tewari & Upreti (2007)
- Hemithecium nagalandicum (Kr.P.Singh & G.P.Sinha) Adaw. & Makhija (2005)
- Hemithecium nakanishianum (Patw. & C.R. Kulk.) Makhija & Dube (2005)
- Hemithecium oshioi (M.Nakan.) M.Nakan. & Kashiw. (2003)
- Hemithecium pulchellum Makhija & Adaw. (2005)
- Hemithecium radicicola (A.W.Archer) A.W.Archer (2005)
- Hemithecium rimulosum (Müll.Arg.) Mangold, Lumbsch & Kalb (2008)
- Hemithecium scariosum Makhija & Adaw. (2005)
- Hemithecium staigerae Adaw. & Makhija (2005)
- Hemithecium verrucosum B.O.Sharma & Khadilkar (2012)
