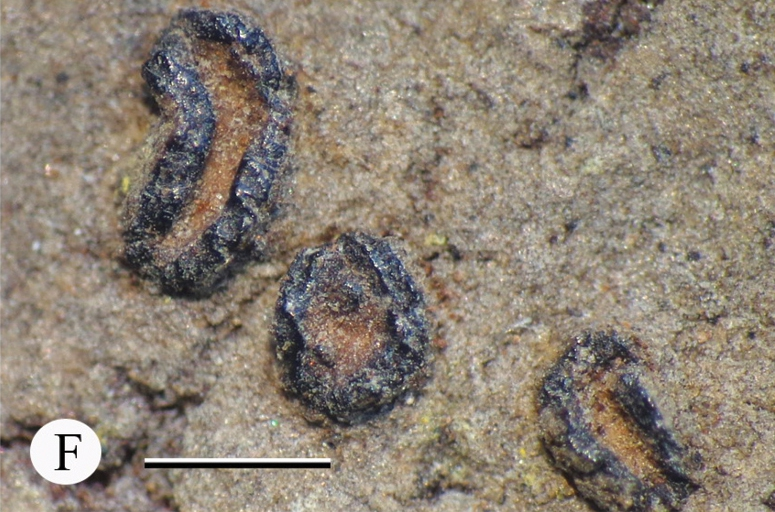
- Allographa lecanactiformis

Scientific classification
- Kingdom: Fungi
- Division: Ascomycota
- Class: Lecanoromycetes
- Order: Graphidales
- Family: Graphidaceae
- Genus: Allographa; Chevall. (1824)

Type species
- Allographa lutea Chevall. (1824)

Species
- About 205 species

= Allographa =

Genus of lichen-forming fungi

Allographa is a genus of script lichens in the family Graphidaceae. It has more than 200 species. Formally circumscribed in 1824 by François Fulgis Chevallier, Allographa was formerly included in Graphis, but was upgraded to generic status in 2018 by lichenologists Klaus Kalb and Robert Lücking, who used molecular phylogenetics analysis to show this group of species to constitute a distinct lineage in the Graphidaceae.

== Taxonomy ==
Allographa was introduced by François Fulgis Chevallier in 1824, with Allographa lutea as the type species (designated by Bettina Staiger in 2002). Modern phylogenetic work showed that Graphis in the broad sense of Staiger and subsequent authors comprises two distantly related lineages, one containing the type species Graphis scripta (treated as Graphis sensu stricto) and a second lineage for which the older name Allographa is available; this interpretation was formalized in a revision that reinstated Allographa as a genus separate from Graphis.

Although Allographa and Graphis can be very similar externally, their separation is supported by broad tendencies in anatomy and chemistry. Allographa usually has prominent, relatively massive lirellae with exciples that are mostly completely carbonized and often striate, sometimes with pigmented pruina, and it generally has larger ascospores with more numerous septa; when the hymenium is inspersed, the inspersion is typically "type B" (in the sense of Lücking 2009). In contrast, Graphis more frequently includes species with secondary thallus substances (for example norstictic, stictic, or salazinic acids) and shows a stronger tendency towards exposed discs; in the Thai treatment, "type A" hymenium inspersion is treated as confined to Graphis.

Because available sequence data cover only a minority of the species historically placed in the broader Graphis complex, Lücking and Kalb combined a molecular backbone with a large phenotype dataset to assign unsampled species using a morphology-based phylogenetic binning approach, enabling large-scale recombination into Allographa despite limited DNA sampling. Applying the same framework in a comprehensive Thai revision, Kalb and colleagues extended the phenotype matrix with newly described taxa and transferred additional species into Allographa while describing further diversity in both Allographa and Graphis.

== Description ==
Allographa is characterised by lirellate ascomata (fruiting bodies), which are elongated and groove-like in shape. One of its defining features is the generally carbonised excipulum, which gives a dark appearance to the fruiting bodies, although some species formerly placed in Hemithecium with uncarbonised (blackened) excipula are also included in this genus.

Allographa typically displays robust and strongly prominent lirellae, often with a massive structure. The ascospores are hyaline (colourless) and usually large to very large in size, turning violet-blue when treated with iodine. A key distinguishing feature from Graphis in the strict sense is the strongly gelatinous hamathecium with thin paraphyses.

While Allographa shares many morphological similarities with Graphis, making clear-cut distinctions challenging, molecular evidence supports its status as a separate genus. Allographa is part of a larger clade within Graphidaceae that includes other lirellate genera such as Diorygma, Glyphis, Pallidogramme, Phaeographis, Platygramme, Platythecium, Sarcographa, Thalloloma, and Thecaria. The genus encompasses species previously assigned to the Graphis carassensis group and some former Hemithecium species. Examples include A. acharii, A. chrysocarpa, A. rhizocola, A. ruiziana, and species related to A. chlorocarpa and A. rufopallida.

== See also ==
- List of Allographa species
