= Asteristion =

Scientific classification
- Domain: Eukaryota
- Kingdom: Fungi
- Division: Ascomycota
- Class: Lecanoromycetes
- Order: Graphidales
- Family: Graphidaceae
- Genus: Asteristion; Leight. (1870)

Type species
- Asteristion erumpens Leight. (1870)

Species
- A. alboannuliforme A. alboolivaceum A. australianum A. cupulare A. leucophthalmum A. platycarpoides A. platycarpum

Genus of lichens

Asteristion is a genus of lichen-forming fungi in the family Graphidaceae. It has seven species. Previously considered a synonym of either Phaeotrema or Thelotrema, molecular evidence led to its resurrection as a distinct genus. Asteristion lichens are corticolous (bark-dwelling), featuring a continuous thallus with a loose to hardened cortex and a photobiont layer containing calcium oxalate crystals. The ascomata, or fruiting bodies, are characterized by their large, often chroodiscoid appearance and the presence of distinct periphysoids. The secondary chemistry of these lichens includes major concentrations of stictic acid and minor to trace amounts of associated substances.

== Taxonomy ==
Asteristion belongs to the tribe Wirthiotremateae in the family Graphidaceae. This tribe, revised in 2017 to account for newly clarified phylogenetic relationships, contains the genera Wirthiotrema, Austrotrema, Asteristion, and Nadvornikia. These genera are characterized by having the substance stictic acid, in addition to minor or trace amounts of related substances. Originally considered a synonym of either Phaeotrema or Thelotrema, Asteristion was later recognized as a section of Thelotrema by Tatsuo Matsumoto in 2000. Molecular evidence and extended phylogenetic analysis reported in the 2017 study have since revealed that the type species, Asteristion erumpens, does not belong to Thelotrema or any other recognized genus. Consequently, Asteristion has been resurrected as a distinct genus, which currently comprises seven species that were formerly members of the Chapsa platycarpa species complex.

The genus name Asteristion derives from the star-like appearance of the recurved thalline margin commonly found in this genus, particularly evident in the type species.

== Description ==
Asteristion lichens are corticolous, featuring a continuous, epiperidermal thallus with a smooth to uneven surface and no prothallus. The thallus comprises a loose to prosoplectenchymatous cortex, a photobiont layer with calcium oxalate crystals, and a thin epi- to endoperidermal medulla. The photobiont in Asteristion lichens is Trentepohlia, a green algal genus.

The ascomata in these lichens are rounded to angular and immersed to erumpent. The disc, which ranges in colour from flesh to brown and is white-pruinose, can be covered or exposed. The proper margin is distinct, fissured to recurved, and separated from the thalline margin by a narrow split, forming a prominent rim around the disc. The thalline margin is white to pale brown and entire to recurved.

Asteristion lichens have an entire, hyaline to pale yellow, paraplectenchymatous excipulum, separated from the covering thalline layer by a split. A columella is absent, and the hypothecium is prosoplectenchymatous and hyaline. The hymenium is hyaline and clear, while the epithecium is grey and granular. The paraphyses are unbranched with smooth apices, and periphysoids are present. The asci are fusiform, with fusiform to ellipsoid ascospores that are transversely septate to muriform, somewhat distoseptate with lens-shaped lumina, and hyaline to brown. Ascospores may be non-amyloid or amyloid. Conidiomata have not been observed to occur in Asteristion lichens.

The secondary chemistry of these lichens includes major concentrations of stictic acid and minor to trace amounts of related substances.

== Comparison with related genera ==
Asteristion species can be distinguished from other genera in the Wirthiotremateae tribe by their large, often chroodiscoid ascomata and the presence of distinct periphysoids (lateral paraphyses). They may resemble Chapsa and its allies, such as Astrochapsa, but can be differentiated by the presence of a distinctly free excipulum forming a double margin, as opposed to a fused excipulum in Chapsa.

== Species ==
As of April 2023, Species Fungorum (in the Catalogue of Life) accept seven species of Asteristion.

- Asteristion alboannuliforme (Nagarkar, Sethy & Patw.) I.Medeiros, Lücking & Lumbsch (2017)
- Asteristion alboolivaceum (Vain.) I.Medeiros, Lücking & Lumbsch (2017)
- Asteristion australianum I.Medeiros, Lücking, Mangold & Lumbsch (2017)
- Asteristion cupulare (Müll.Arg.) I.Medeiros, Lücking & Lumbsch (2017)
- Asteristion leucophthalmum (Nyl.) I.Medeiros, Lücking & Lumbsch (2017)
- Asteristion platycarpoides (Tuck.) I.Medeiros, Lücking & Lumbsch (2017)
- Asteristion platycarpum (Tuck.) I.Medeiros, Lücking & Lumbsch (2017)

The taxon Asteristion erumpens Leight. (1870) is now named Phaeotrema erumpens.
