= Myriochapsa psoromica =

Scientific classification
- Kingdom: Fungi
- Division: Ascomycota
- Class: Lecanoromycetes
- Order: Graphidales
- Family: Graphidaceae
- Genus: Myriochapsa
- Species: M. psoromica

Binomial name
- Myriochapsa psoromica (M.Cáceres, L.S.de Jesus & T.S.Vieira) M.Cáceres, Lücking & Lumbsch (2013)

Synonyms
- Chapsa psoromica M.Cáceres, L.S.de Jesus & T.S.Vieira (2011)

Species of lichen

Myriochapsa psoromica is a rare species of lichen in the family Graphidaceae. It was originally described in 2011 by Brazilian scientists from specimens collected in the Amazon forest of Rondônia state, and was later moved to its own new genus in 2013 based on genetic studies. The lichen forms an olive-green crust with a glossy, varnished appearance on tree bark, with small angular pits containing flesh-colored fruiting bodies. It is known only from its original collection site in western Brazil's Amazon basin, where it grows on large canopy trees in shaded, humid rainforest understory.

== Taxonomy ==
Myriochapsa psoromica was first described scientifically in 2011 as Chapsa psoromica by the Brazilian lichenologists Marcela Cáceres, Luciana Santos de Jesus, and Teresa Santos Vieira, based on material collected in 2009 from the Cuniã Ecological Station in Rondônia, western Amazonia. Molecular work soon showed that the species falls outside Chapsa sensu stricto and is instead closely allied to Myriotrema within the Ocellularia clade of the Graphidaceae. To reflect that relationship—and its unique combination of a densely corticate thallus, psoromic acid chemistry, and wide, fissured apothecial pores—Cáceres, Robert Lücking, and H. Thorsten Lumbsch erected the genus Myriochapsa in 2013, transferring the taxon as the type species of the new genus.

== Description ==
The lichen forms an olive-green crust (thallus) up to about 5 cm across on tree bark. Its surface is smooth to slightly uneven, and a well-developed, tightly woven outer skin (a prosoplectenchymatous cortex) gives the thallus a varnished look. Beneath this cortex lies an irregular layer of green algal cells; no calcium oxalate crystals are present. Standard chemical spot tests show a strong response for psoromic acid, a secondary metabolite that is rare in related genera.

The fruiting bodies (apothecia) rupture through the cortex and appear as angular to round pits 0.4–0.6 mm wide. Each apothecium is roofed by a relatively wide pore whose rim (the thalline margin) splits into three to six small, upright lobules, giving a fissured appearance; the interior disk is flesh colored and translucent. There is no internal columella (a sterile pillar found in some relatives). Sectioning reveals a yellow wall built of tightly interlocked fungal hyphae, with indistinct periphysoids. The spore-bearing layer (hymenium) is 150–200 micrometres (μm) tall and densely filled (inspersed) with refractive granules; some dissolve in potassium hydroxide, leaving a clear hymenium, whereas others persist. Each ascus contains eight colorless ascospores that are oblong, 35–45 × 9–12 μm, divided by nine to eleven cross-walls. The spores stain deep violet-blue in iodine solution (an amyloid reaction).

== Habitat and distribution ==
The species is known to occur only at its type locality in Rondônia State, Brazil, within the western Amazon basin. It was collected at about 100 m elevation on the bark of large canopy trees in shaded, humid rainforest understory. No additional populations have been recorded.
