= Myriochapsa =

Scientific classification
- Domain: Eukaryota
- Kingdom: Fungi
- Division: Ascomycota
- Class: Lecanoromycetes
- Order: Graphidales
- Family: Graphidaceae
- Genus: Myriochapsa; M.Cáceres, Lücking & Lumbsch (2013)

Type species
- Myriochapsa psoromica (M.Cáceres, L.S.de Jesus & T.S.Vieira) M.Cáceres, Lücking & Lumbsch (2013)

Species
- M. annulata M. chocoensis M. psoromica

Genus of lichens

Myriochapsa is a genus of corticolous (bark-dwelling), crustose lichens in the subfamily Graphidoidae of the family Graphidaceae. It has three species. The genus was circumscribed in 2013 by Marcela Cáceres, Robert Lücking, and H. Thorsten Lumbsch, with the Brazilian Myriochapsa psoromica assigned as the type species. The generic name combines Myriotrema and Chapsa, referring to the two Graphidaceae genera that it resembles. The main distinguishing characteristics of the new genus are its densely corticate thallus, and the presence of the lichen product psoromic acid. Additionally, its apothecia have wider pores, with differently textured margins. Although originally created as a monotypic genus, Harrie Sipman added two South American species in 2014.

== Species ==
- Myriochapsa annulata Sipman (2014) – Venezuela
- Myriochapsa chocoensis Sipman (2014) – Colombia
- Myriochapsa psoromica (M.Cáceres, L.S.de Jesus & T.S.Vieira) M.Cáceres, Lücking & Lumbsch (2013) – Brazil
