= Pseudochapsa isidiifera =

Scientific classification
- Kingdom: Fungi
- Division: Ascomycota
- Class: Lecanoromycetes
- Order: Graphidales
- Family: Graphidaceae
- Genus: Pseudochapsa
- Species: P. isidiifera

Binomial name
- Pseudochapsa isidiifera (Frisch & Kalb) Parnmen, Lücking & Lumbsch (2012)

Synonyms
- Chapsa isidiifera Frisch & Kalb (2009)

Species of lichen

Pseudochapsa isidiifera is a species of corticolous (bark-dwelling), crustose lichen in the family Graphidaceae. Found in Brazil, it was first formally described as a new species in 2009 by the lichenologists Andreas Frisch and Klaus Kalb, as a member of the genus Chapsa. The type specimen was collected by Kalb in 1980 in a rainforest along the Rio Negro, between 100 and 200 km (62 and 124 mi) upstream from Manaus. The species epithet isidiifera refers to the presence of isidia on the thallus. Sittiporn Parnmen, Robert Lücking, and Helge Thorsten Lumbsch transferred the taxon to the genus Pseudochapsa in 2012.
