= Leucodecton coppinsii =

Scientific classification
- Domain: Eukaryota
- Kingdom: Fungi
- Division: Ascomycota
- Class: Lecanoromycetes
- Order: Graphidales
- Family: Graphidaceae
- Genus: Leucodecton
- Species: L. coppinsii

Binomial name
- Leucodecton coppinsii (Homchant.) Weerakoon, Lücking & Lumbsch (2014)

Synonyms
- Myriotrema coppinsii Homchant. (2002)

Species of lichen

Leucodecton coppinsii is a species of corticolous (bark-dwelling) lichen in the family Graphidaceae. It is found in lowland forests of Sarawak, Malaysia.

== Taxonomy ==
The lichen was formally described as a new species in 2002 by Thai lichenologist Natsurang Homchantara. The type specimen was collected from Gunung Mulu National Park (Miri Division), where it grows on riverside trees at low elevations. It is only known to occur at the type locality. The specific epithet honours Brian J. Coppins, who collected the type, and co-described several new species with her. The lichen was originally classified in the genus Myriotrema. Gothamie Weerakoon, Robert Lücking, and H. Thorsten Lumbsch proposed a transfer to Leucodecton in 2014.

== Description ==
The lichen has an olivaceous thallus with a somewhat minutely warted (verruculose) texture. The cortex is not well developed, and the algal layer (the photobiont) is scattered amongst the hyphae of the medulla. The apothecia are numerous throughout the thallus surface; they occur solitarily, and are 0.17–0.2 mm in diameter with a round pore. The ascospores are thin walled, shaped like narrow ellipsoids, colourless, and number eight per ascus. They measure 11–17 by 5.5–8.5 μm. Leucodecton coppinsii contains both stictic and constictic acids.
