= Wirthiotrema =

Scientific classification
- Kingdom: Fungi
- Division: Ascomycota
- Class: Lecanoromycetes
- Order: Graphidales
- Family: Graphidaceae
- Genus: Wirthiotrema; Rivas Plata, Kalb, Frisch & Lumbsch (2010)

Type species
- Wirthiotrema glaucopallens (Nyl.) Rivas Plata & Kalb (2010)

Species
- W. desquamans W. duplomarginatum W. glaucopallens W. santessonii W. trypaneoides W. xanthopustulatum

Genus of lichens

Wirthiotrema is a genus of lichen-forming fungi in the family Graphidaceae. These tropical bark-dwelling lichens form yellow-green to light olive crusts with small, disc-like fruiting bodies that open through tiny circular pores. The genus contains six species found in lowland to mountain forests across tropical regions worldwide.

== Taxonomy ==
The genus was circumscribed in 2010 by Eimy Rivas Plata, Klaus Kalb, Andreas Frisch, and H. Thorsten Lumbsch, with Wirthiotrema glaucopallens assigned as the type species. Wirthiotrema contains species that were formerly considered part of the Thelotrema glaucopallens species group. The genus name honours the German lichenologist Volkmar Wirth, "for his numerous outstanding contributions to lichenology".

Earlier morphological classification systems could not comfortably accommodate the "glaucopallens group". Molecular phylogenetics analyses showed that these species fall outside the main clades of Thelotrema, Myriotrema and Leucodecton, prompting their segregation. The new genus is set apart by a combination of features: a prosoplectenchymatous (brick-like) thallus cortex that often splits internally; non-amyloid, muriform (multi-partioned) spores; and apothecia that lack the carbonised margins or supporting paraphyses typical of close relatives. These traits, together with DNA evidence, place Wirthiotrema as a distinct lineage of the family Graphidaceae.

== Description ==
The thallus of Wirthiotrema grows on bark and is usually a yellow-green to light olive sheet that can look smooth or show fine cracks; it reaches about 0.25 mm in thickness. A compact "skin" (cortex) made of tightly packed, longitudinally aligned fungal cells—a prosoplectenchymatous cortex—often splits internally, giving the surface a slightly cracked (rimose) appearance. In one member of the genus, small wart-like outgrowths called dactyls (essentially miniature finger-like pustules) punctuate the thallus surface. These dactyls sometimes break open and may help the lichen spread tiny fragments of itself.

Apothecia—the disc-like fruiting bodies—are myriotremoid, meaning they sit flush with the thallus and open through a small circular pore. They begin immersed in the thallus and eventually push out (erumpent), remaining ≤ 0.6 mm across with a pore ≤ 0.2 mm wide. The visible rim is the same colour as the surrounding thallus, while the hidden disc is dark and often dusted with a thin white frost-like coating (pruina). Internally, the apothecial wall (excipulum) is built from isodiametric cells—a paraplectenchymatous texture—and is brownish towards the top; unlike many relatives it is fused into the surrounding tissue and lacks the slender supporting hyphae called lateral paraphyses. The transparent fertile layer (hymenium) stands 80–170 μm high and is free of the cloudy masses (inspersion) common in some other genera. Simple, straight paraphyses line the hymenium, and there is no central column (columella).

Each club-shaped ascus contains eight ascospores. These spores are ellipsoid, 20–50 μm long by 9–15 μm wide, and muriform—sub-divided like a brick wall by both cross-walls and lengthwise walls—and they do not stain blue in iodine (I-, i.e. non-amyloid). Asexual reproduction occurs in immersed to slightly emerging pycnidia that bear bottle-shaped conidiogenous cells producing tiny (roughly 3 × 1 μm) oblong conidia. All known species share a chemical profile dominated by stictic acid and related compounds. Other compounds present in minor amounts include acetylconstictic acid, constictic acid, and consalazinic acid; lichexanthone occurs in W. xanthopustulatum.

== Habitat and distribution ==
Wirthiotrema is a strictly corticolous (bark-dwelling) genus that favours shaded to semi-exposed bark on tree trunks in lowland to lower montane rainforests throughout the tropics. The original circumscription described its range as pantropical, with collections from humid forest belts between the coastal plain and roughly 1500 m elevation.

== Species ==
As of June 2025, Species Fungorum (in the Catalogue of Life) accept six species of Wirthiotrema:

- Wirthiotrema desquamans (Müll.Arg.) Lücking (2012)
- Wirthiotrema duplomarginatum Lücking, Mangold & Lumbsch (2012)
- Wirthiotrema glaucopallens (Nyl.) Rivas Plata & Kalb (2010)
- Wirthiotrema santessonii (Hale) Rivas Plata & Frisch (2010)
- Wirthiotrema trypaneoides (Nyl.) Rivas Plata & Lücking (2010)
- Wirthiotrema xanthopustulatum Aptroot & M.F.Souza (2021) – Brazil
