= Fibrillithecis sprucei =

Scientific classification
- Kingdom: Fungi
- Division: Ascomycota
- Class: Lecanoromycetes
- Order: Graphidales
- Family: Graphidaceae
- Genus: Fibrillithecis
- Species: F. sprucei

Binomial name
- Fibrillithecis sprucei Mangold, Lücking & Lumbsch (2011)

Species of lichen-forming fungus

Fibrillithecis sprucei is a rare species of lichen in the family Graphidaceae, known only from a single historic collection. It was discovered by re-examining a 19th-century plant collection made by the British botanist Richard Spruce along Brazil's Rio Negro river. The species is distinguished by its unusually large ascospores and contains psoromic acid, which produces a distinctive yellow reaction in chemical spot tests.

== Taxonomy ==
Fibrillithecis sprucei was described in 2011 by Mangold, Robert Lücking and H. Thorsten Lumbsch after re-examining a 19th-century collection made by the British botanist Richard Spruce on the Rio Negro in Amazonas State, Brazil. Spruce's bark sample actually held two similar lichens: the previously named Fibrillithecis dehiscens (originally Thelotrema dehiscens) and a second, overlooked form with much larger apothecia and spores. Although molecular data were not yet available, clear morphological differences warranted recognition of the larger-spored material as a new species, named in honour of its collector. F. sprucei is the first member of the genus known to produce large, richly muriform ascospores (120–180 × 25–35 μm); all other species have much smaller, simply septate or only weakly muriform spores no longer than about 60 μm.

A three-gene phylogeny that sampled most segregate genera of the Myriotrema–Ocellularia complex placed Fibrillithecis as sister to Myriotrema sensu stricto, but F. sprucei fell outside this core clade, indicating it may represent an independent lineage within the group.

== Description ==
The lichen forms a pale grey-green to olive crust up to 10 cm across and 0.2–0.5 mm thick on tree bark. The surface is uneven and often blistered, underlain by a thin (20–30 μm) cartilaginous cortex. A thick algal layer sits above a white medulla; calcium oxalate crystals are absent.

Rounded apothecia, 0.7–1.2 mm in diameter, push through the thallus and resemble tiny volcanoes with a narrow pore (0.05–0.1 mm wide) that hides the disc. The surrounding thalline margin is thick and coarsely scalloped, exposing the medulla's white edge. Internally the apothecial wall (excipulum) is pale yellow and 30–50 μm thick, laterally sheathed by algiferous thallus tissue; toward the surface, some of the fungal hyphae project outward as short, radially arranged fibrils. The clear hymenium is 180–250 μm tall and packed with oil droplets (an inspersion).

Each club-shaped (clavate) ascus contains a single, colourless ascospore that is divided by many transverse and longitudinal walls (muriform) and stains violet-blue with iodine (I+). The spore is 4–5 times longer than wide. Thin-layer chromatography shows psoromic acid, giving a yellow reaction with the chemical spot test P (para-phenylenediamine).

== Habitat and distribution ==
Fibrillithecis sprucei is known only from the type specimen collected in Amazonian rainforest. It grew on the bark of a mature tree along the Rio Negro near São Carlos, in humid lowland forest. No modern collections have yet been made, so its true range, ecological preferences and conservation status remain uncertain.
