= Austrotrema =

Scientific classification
- Domain: Eukaryota
- Kingdom: Fungi
- Division: Ascomycota
- Class: Lecanoromycetes
- Order: Graphidales
- Family: Graphidaceae
- Genus: Austrotrema; I.Medeiros, Lücking & Lumbsch (2017)

Type species
- Austrotrema bicinctulum (Nyl.) I.Medeiros, Lücking & Lumbsch (2017)

Species
- A. bicinctulum A. myriocarpum A. terebrans

Genus of lichens

Austrotrema is a genus of lichen-forming fungi in the family Graphidaceae. It is primarily found in the Australian-Southeast Asian region. The genus is characterized by small, pore-like apothecia with a double margin, faintly amyloid ascospores, and stictic acid chemistry. Austrotrema species grow on tree bark and have a continuous thallus with a cortex that is prosoplectenchymatous–featuring densely packed, filamentous fungal hyphae that run parallel to the surface of the lichen, creating a compact and firm texture. The genus is closely related to Thelotrema and Leucodecton, but can be distinguished from them based on molecular phylogenetic data, specific morphological traits, and its secondary chemistry. Currently, Austrotrema comprises three species.

== Taxonomy ==
Austrotrema was circumscribed by lichenologists Ian Medeiros, Robert Lücking, and H. Thorsten Lumbsch in 2017. The genus was created to accommodate the three species of the Thelotrema bicinctulum species complex, which molecular phylogenetic analysis showed to be sufficiently genetically distinct to warrant placement in a new genus. Austrotrema is characterized by its small, pore-like apothecia with a double margin, faintly amyloid ascospores, and stictic acid chemistry. The type species for this genus is Austrotrema bicinctulum, originally described as Thelotrema bicinctulum by William Nylander in 1861. The genus name Austrotrema is derived from the distribution of the type species in the Australian-Southeast Asian region.

== Description ==
Austrotrema lichens grow on the bark of trees and have a continuous thallus (body) with no prothallus. The cortex of these lichens is prosoplectenchymatous, featuring an irregular to thick layer of photobiont Trenepohlia green algal cells, interspersed with calcium oxalate crystal clusters. The medulla is indistinct and located between the upper and lower layers of the periderm. The minute ascomata are round and can be either immersed or barely erumpent. The disc is almost entirely covered by a narrow pore, with a light to dark grey colour and a white-pruinose appearance. The proper margin is distinct and may be slightly to deeply fissured, surrounded by a pale rim formed by the double margin. The thalline margin is thin, smooth, and ranges from yellow to olive-brown, with entire to slightly eroded or fissured edges.

The excipulum is paraplectenchymatous and separated from the covering thalline layer by a split. A columella is absent, while the hypothecium is prosoplectenchymatous and hyaline. The hymenium is hyaline and clear, while the epithecium is gray and granular. The unbranched paraphyses have smooth tips, and periphysoids are present to indistinct. The asci are fusiform, with eight ascospores per ascus. The ascospores are hyaline, ellipsoid, tapering at one end, and transversely septate to somewhat muriform with lens-shaped lumina. Conidiomata have not been observed to occur in this genus.

The secondary chemistry of Austrotrema lichens includes stictic acid as the major component, along with various related substances in minor or trace amounts.

== Comparison with related genera ==
Austrotrema bears resemblance to certain species of Thelotrema, and its distinction from Thelotrema at the genus level can only be made with molecular phylogenetic data. However, Austrotrema differs from similar Thelotrema species with transversely septate or small muriform ascospores and stictic acid due to its dense, prosoplectenchymatous cortex. Austrotrema can also be confused with Leucodecton species, but its close relationship with Nadvornikia hawaiiensis places it in the same tribe as Austrotrema. Within the Wirthiotremateae tribe, Austrotrema can be distinguished from Asteristion by its small ascomata with entire, pore-like thalline margin, and from Wirthiotrema by its less glossy thallus that does not split internally. The thalli of Wirthiotrema species tend to be more greenish, while those of Austrotrema are brownish.

== Species ==
- Austrotrema bicinctulum (Nyl.) I.Medeiros, Lücking & Lumbsch (2017) – Australasia
- Austrotrema myriocarpum (Fée) I.Medeiros, Lücking & Lumbsch (2017) – South America
- Austrotrema terebrans (Nyl.) I.Medeiros, Lücking & Lumbsch (2017) – Cameroon; India; Thailand
