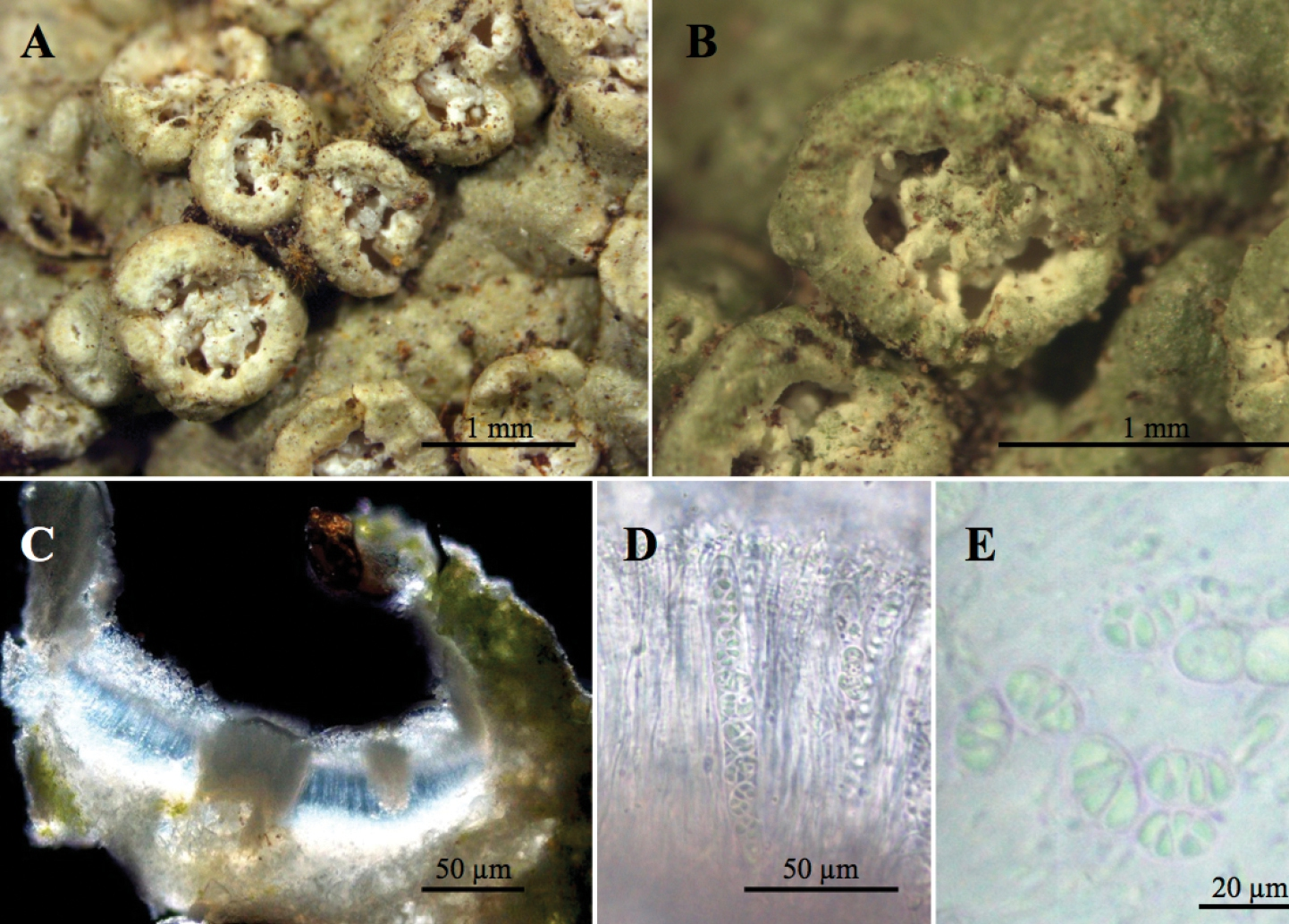
- Morphology and anatomy of Glaucotrema thailandicum A–B habit of ascoma, C cross-section of ascoma showing whitish and reticulate columella, D asci with spores, and E submuriform ascospores (holotype).

Scientific classification
- Kingdom: Fungi
- Division: Ascomycota
- Class: Lecanoromycetes
- Order: Graphidales
- Family: Graphidaceae
- Genus: Glaucotrema; Rivas Plata & Lumbsch (2012)

Type species
- Glaucotrema glaucophaenum (Kremp.) Rivas Plata & Lumbsch (2012)

= Glaucotrema =

Genus of lichens

Glaucotrema is a genus of lichen-forming fungi in the family Graphidaceae. It has five species.

== Taxonomy ==
The genus was circumscribed in 2012 by the lichenologists Eimy Rivas Plata and Helge Thorsten Lumbsch, with Glaucotrema glaucophaenum assigned as the type species. This lichen was originally described as a species of Thelotrema by August von Krempelhuber in 1875, and was later classified in the genus Myriotrema. The genus name merges the suffix -trema with a portion of the epithet from its type species, glaucophaenum.

Originally, Glaucotrema was proposed to contain the type and one other species, G. costaricense. Three additional newly described species were added to the genus in 2014–2016, from collections made in Brazil and Thailand.

== Description ==
The thallus of Glaucotrema is characterised by a pale green-grey to pale olive-green colour, with a surface that can range from smooth to slightly uneven. It features a densely packed outer layer (cortex) composed of tightly interwoven fungal cells (prosoplectenchymatous structure). Within this structure lies a layer of algae cells (the photobiont), interspersed with clusters of calcium oxalate crystals.

The reproductive structures of Glaucotrema, known as apothecia, are typically rounded to angular and can be either slightly emerging from the thallus or prominently displayed. The discs of these structures range in colour from flesh-colured to pale brown and are thinly covered with a white, powdery coating (pruinose). The edges of these discs are usually smooth, though they can occasionally be fissured. While a true central support column (columella) is absent, a pseudo-column (pseudocolumella) often appears, consisting of tissue strands that originate from the side of the cup-like structure (lateral excipulum). The excipulum (the tissue surrounding the reproductive disc) also has a tightly interwoven cellular structure (prosoplectenchymatous) and is typically colourless. It may either remain attached or become partially detached and perforated (fenestrate). There are no hair-like structures (periphysoids) around the edges of the disc. The spore-producing filaments (paraphyses) within the apothecia are simple and unbranched.

Spores produced by Glaucotrema are typically eight per sac (ascus), ellipsoid in shape, and divided into four parts by three cross-walls (3-septate), with thick dividers and lens-shaped internal spaces (lumina). These spores are colourless and turn violet-blue when stained with iodine (I+ violet-blue). Glaucotrema thailandicum is unique in the genus in having submuriform ascospores. Chemically, Glaucotrema contains psoromic acid, which reacts yellow when tested with paraphenylenediamine (P+ yellow), indicating its presence.

== Species ==
- Glaucotrema bahianum Lücking (2015) – Brazil
- Glaucotrema costaricense (Müll.Arg.) Rivas Plata & Lumbsch (2012) – Central America
- Glaucotrema glaucophaenum (Kremp.) Rivas Plata & Lumbsch (2012) – Asia; Australia
- Glaucotrema stegoboloides M.Cáceres, Aptroot & Lücking (2014) – Brazil
- Glaucotrema thailandicum Naksuwankul, Lücking & Lumbsch (2016) – Thailand
