= Chroodiscus =

Scientific classification
- Domain: Eukaryota
- Kingdom: Fungi
- Division: Ascomycota
- Class: Lecanoromycetes
- Order: Graphidales
- Family: Graphidaceae
- Genus: Chroodiscus (Müll.Arg.) Müll.Arg. (1890)

Type species
- Chroodiscus coccineus (Leight.) Müll.Arg. (1890)

Synonyms
- Ocellularia sect. Chroodiscus Müll.Arg. (1883); Phyllobrassia Vain. (1921)

Genus of lichens

Chroodiscus is a genus of leaf-dwelling lichens in the family Graphidaceae. These lichens form thin, smooth crusts directly on living leaves and are characterized by distinctive star-shaped fruiting bodies that split into triangular segments, with centres ranging from grey to bright scarlet-red depending on their chemical composition. The genus is found throughout tropical regions worldwide, growing in the shaded understory of rainforests from lowland areas to mountain cloud forests, where they serve as sensitive indicators of undisturbed forest conditions.

== Taxonomy ==
Chroodiscus was first introduced by the Swiss lichenologist Johannes Müller Argoviensis in 1883 as a section of the genus Ocellularia. In his original description, Müller characterized the section by its photobiont layer being phyllactideum (containing green algae arranged in a specific pattern) and its apothecia (fruiting bodies) being pale or variously coloured. He described the type species, Ocellularia argillacea, as having a clay-coloured to pale or greenish-clay coloured thallus that was very thin, smooth, and interrupted by small globular swellings. The apothecia were measured at 0.2 to 0.5 millimetres wide and described as having broad, prominent margins. In 1890 he promoted the section to generic status.

== Description ==
Chroodiscus forms a thin, smooth to slightly glossy crust (thallus) that grows directly on living leaves (foliicolous) and lacks a true cortex. Its ascomata are strikingly chroodiscoid: minute discs that split into several triangular lobules which then curl back to give a star-shaped outline; the exposed centre ranges from grey to scarlet-red, according to pigment chemistry. A pale, paraplectenchymatous excipulum borders each disc, while the clear hymenium contains lax, branched paraphyses and no periphysoids. The asci are Thelotrema-type (thin-walled, iodine-negative) and usually release eight hyaline ascospores that are transversely 3–7-septate, thin-walled and non-amyloid (about 12–30 × 4–7 μm). Many species synthesise orange-red anthraquinones or stictic acid-derivatives that tint the discs; others are chemically inert.

Species differ mainly in disc colour, spore size and chemistry: for example, C. argillaceus has grey discs and stictic acid, whereas C. mirificus develops vivid red discs rich in anthraquinones. The combination of star-shaped discs, absence of periphysoids and thin-walled, non-amyloid spores separates Chroodiscus from superficially similar genera such as Chapsa, Astrochapsa and Pseudochapsa, whose discs lack the recurved lobules or whose spores react differently with iodine.

== Ecology ==
The genus is strictly pantropical: records span Central and South America, West and Central Africa, Madagascar, India, Southeast Asia and north-east Australia. All known species are obligately foliicolous, colonising the shaded, humid understory of evergreen rainforests from lowland plains up to the montane cloud forest belt. A phenotype-based phylogeny indicates a South American origin in the mid-Cretaceous (roughly 120–100 Ma) followed by stepwise dispersal through Africa, India and Southeast Asia, with most present-day taxa now restricted to a single continent. Because they depend on intact, moist canopy microclimates, Chroodiscus species are considered sensitive indicators of undisturbed tropical forest and tend to disappear after forest clearance or prolonged drought.

== Species ==
As of June 2025, Species Fungorum (in the Catalogue of Life) accepts 19 species of Chroodiscus:

- Chroodiscus africanus R.Sant. & Lücking (1999)
- Chroodiscus anomalus Vězda (1975)
- Chroodiscus argillaceus (Müll.Arg.) Lücking & Papong (2009)
- Chroodiscus australiensis Vězda & Lumbsch (1990)
- Chroodiscus australis Kantvilas & Vězda (2000)
- Chroodiscus coccineus (Leight.) Müll.Arg. (1890)
- Chroodiscus defectus Papong & Lücking (2009)
- Chroodiscus graphideus Lücking & Kalb (2008)
- Chroodiscus homchantarae Papong & Lücking (2009)
- Chroodiscus khaolungensis Papong & Lücking (2009)
- Chroodiscus khaosokensis Papong & Lücking (2009)
- Chroodiscus mirificus (Kremp.) R.Sant. (1952)
- Chroodiscus neotropicus Kalb & Vězda (1992)
- Chroodiscus parvisporus Kalb & Lücking (2002)
- Chroodiscus subhimalayanus S.Joshi & Upreti (2010) – India
- Chroodiscus submuralis Lücking (1999)
- Chroodiscus verrucosus R.Sant., Lücking & Vězda (1999)
