= Pseudochapsa lueckingii =

Scientific classification
- Kingdom: Fungi
- Division: Ascomycota
- Class: Lecanoromycetes
- Order: Graphidales
- Family: Graphidaceae
- Genus: Pseudochapsa
- Species: P. lueckingii

Binomial name
- Pseudochapsa lueckingii (Kalb) Parnmen, Lücking & Lumbsch (2012)

Synonyms
- Chapsa lueckingii Kalb (2009)

Species of lichen

Pseudochapsa lueckingii is a species of corticolous (bark-dwelling), crustose lichen in the family Graphidaceae. It is known only from a single collection in São Paulo, Brazil.

== Taxonomy ==
The lichen was first formally described as a new species in 2009 by Klaus Kalb. He collected the type specimen from a dense and humid rainforest at an elevation of 800 m (2,600 ft), where it was found growing on the smooth bark of a deciduous tree. The species epithet honours his colleague Robert Lücking, "for his outstanding contributions to tropical lichenology". The taxon was transferred in 2012 to Pseudochapsa, a segregate genus of Chapsa, characterised by the brown colour of its excipulum.

== Description ==
Pseudochapsa lueckingii has a smooth, olive-green thallus with a 3–10 μm-thick, hyaline cortical layer. It has large, more-or-less round apothecia measuring 0.7–2 mm in diameter with a pale brown disc covered with white pruina. Ascospores typically have between 5 and 7 transverse septa, and measure 17–25 by 6–7 μm. The lichen contains stictic acid as a major metabolite and minor amounts of constictic acid. Kalb suggests that the Panamanian species Pseudochapsa pseudoschizostoma is closely related; this species differs from P. lueckingii in lacking a cortex and in its much smaller apothecia.
