= Myriotrema muluense =

Scientific classification
- Domain: Eukaryota
- Kingdom: Fungi
- Division: Ascomycota
- Class: Lecanoromycetes
- Order: Graphidales
- Family: Graphidaceae
- Genus: Myriotrema
- Species: M. muluense

Binomial name
- Myriotrema muluense Homchant. & Coppins (2002)

Species of lichen

Myriotrema muluense is a species of corticolous (bark-dwelling) lichen in the family Graphidaceae. Found in Malaysia, it was formally described as a new species in 2002 by lichenologists Natsurang Homchantara and Brian J. Coppins. The type specimen was collected by the second author from Gunung Mulu National Park (Sarawak) at an altitude of 150 m (490 ft). It specific epithet refers to the type locality, the only location the species is known to occur. The lichen has a smooth and shiny, grey olivaceous thallus with a thick cortex and a white medulla. It does not contain any lichen substances.
