= Wirthiotrema xanthopustulatum =

Scientific classification
- Kingdom: Fungi
- Division: Ascomycota
- Class: Lecanoromycetes
- Order: Graphidales
- Family: Graphidaceae
- Genus: Wirthiotrema
- Species: W. xanthopustulatum

Binomial name
- Wirthiotrema xanthopustulatum Aptroot & M.F.Souza (2021)

Species of lichen

Wirthiotrema xanthopustulatum is a species of corticolous (bark-dwelling) lichen in the family Graphidaceae. Found in Brazil, it was formally described as a new species in 2021 by lichenologists André Aptroot and Maria Fernanda de Souza. The type specimen was collected in Tagaçaba Porto da Linha (Guaraqueçaba, Paraná) on tree bark. It has a pale olivaceous, shiny metallic-green thallus that covers an area up to 10 cm (4 in) in diameter. It contains the secondary compounds protocetraric acid and lichexanthone. This latter compound causes the lichen thallus to fluoresce a yellow colour when shone with a long-wavelength UV light. Wirthiotrema santessonii is similar in appearance, but it contains stictic acid rather than protocetraric acid and lichexanthone.
