= Myriotrema thailandicum =

Scientific classification
- Domain: Eukaryota
- Kingdom: Fungi
- Division: Ascomycota
- Class: Lecanoromycetes
- Order: Graphidales
- Family: Graphidaceae
- Genus: Myriotrema
- Species: M. thailandicum

Binomial name
- Myriotrema thailandicum Homchant. & Coppins (2002)

Species of lichen

Myriotrema thailandicum is a species of lichen in the family Graphidaceae. Found in Thailand, it was formally described as a new species in 2002 by lichenologists Natsurang Homchantara and Brian J. Coppins. The type specimen was collected from Namtok Phlio National Park (Chanthaburi Province) at an elevation of 100 m (330 ft). Here, on a trail close to the Phlio waterfall, it was found in a lowland rainforest, growing on both rocks and tree trunks. The lichen has a smooth and shiny, greenish-grey thallus with a dense cortex and a white medulla. It contains fumarprotocetraric acid, and sometimes has trace amounts of protocetraric acid.
