= Leucodecton canescens =

Scientific classification
- Domain: Eukaryota
- Kingdom: Fungi
- Division: Ascomycota
- Class: Lecanoromycetes
- Order: Graphidales
- Family: Graphidaceae
- Genus: Leucodecton
- Species: L. canescens

Binomial name
- Leucodecton canescens Weerakoon, Lücking & Lumbsch (2014)

Species of lichen

Leucodecton canescens is a species of lichen in the family Graphidaceae. Found in Sri Lanka, it was formally described as a new species in 2014 by lichenologists Gothamie Weerakoon, Robert Lücking and Helge Thorsten Lumbsch. The type specimen was collected from the Maussakanda Tea Estate (Matale, Central Province) at an altitude of 1,074 m (3,524 ft). The lichen, which has been recorded from several locations in the Central Province, grows in semi-exposed, disturbed areas at high elevations. The specific epithet canescens refers to the grey-coloured cover of the thallus.

Leucodecton canescens has a smooth, grey thallus that is 70–100 μm thick with a thin (5–10 μm) cortex. The ascomata are rounded, immersed in the substrate, and measure 0.2–0.3 mm in diameter. The ascospores are muriform, with dimensions of 25–30 by 10–12 μm. Secondary chemicals present in the lichen include stictic acid, constictic acid, acetylconstictic acid, and hypostictic acid. Leucodecton fissurinum is somewhat similar in morphology, but it has a yellowish thallus and narrower ascomata pores that conceal the disc.
