= Leucodecton fuscomarginatum =

Scientific classification
- Domain: Eukaryota
- Kingdom: Fungi
- Division: Ascomycota
- Class: Lecanoromycetes
- Order: Graphidales
- Family: Graphidaceae
- Genus: Leucodecton
- Species: L. fuscomarginatum

Binomial name
- Leucodecton fuscomarginatum Weerakoon, Lücking & Lumbsch (2014)

Species of lichen

Leucodecton fuscomarginatum is a species of lichen in the family Graphidaceae. Found in Sri Lanka, it was formally described as a new species in 2014 by lichenologists Gothamie Weerakoon, Robert Lücking and Helge Thorsten Lumbsch. The type specimen was collected from the Kikiliyamana Tea Estate (Nuwara Eliya, Central Province) at an altitude of 1,280 m (4,200 ft). The lichen, which is known to occur only at the type locality, grows in disturbed vegetation. The specific epithet fuscomarginatum refers to the rims of the ascomata pores, which are typically brown in colour. Leucodecton fuscomarginatum has a shiny, smooth, light greenish to yellowish brown thallus measuring 50–100 μm thick with a thin cortex. The ascospores are muriform, ellipsoid in shape, and measure 30–40 by 10–12 μm. Secondary chemicals present in the lichen include stictic acid, constictic acid, acetylconstictic acid, and hypostictic acid.
