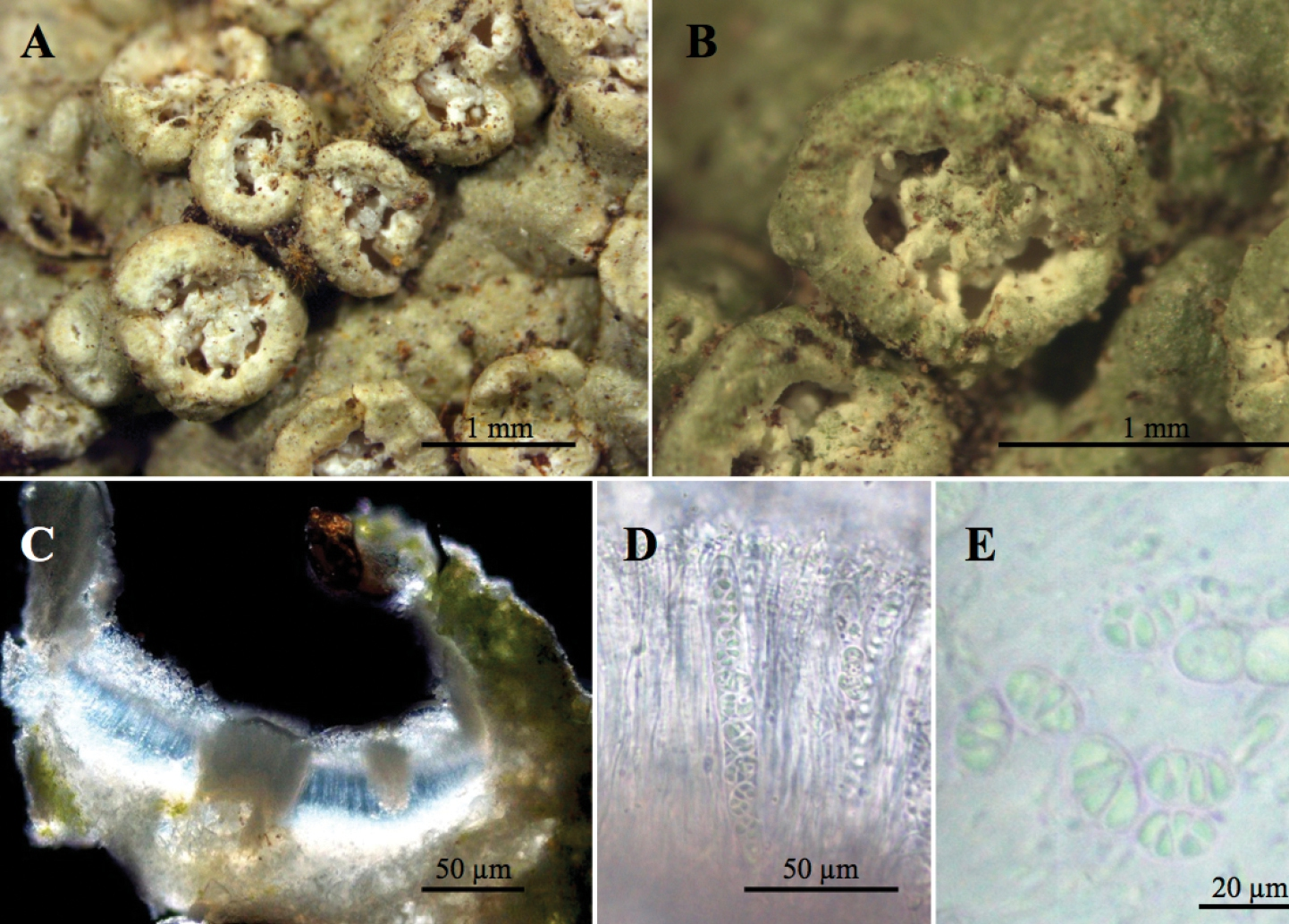
- Morphology and anatomy of Glaucotrema thailandicum. A–B: habit of ascoma, C: cross-section of ascoma showing whitish and reticulate columella, D: asci with spores, and E: submuriform ascospores (holotype). Scale bar A–B = 1 mm, C–D = 50 μm, E = 20 μm.

Scientific classification
- Kingdom: Fungi
- Division: Ascomycota
- Class: Lecanoromycetes
- Order: Graphidales
- Family: Graphidaceae
- Genus: Glaucotrema
- Species: G. thailandicum

Binomial name
- Glaucotrema thailandicum Naksuwankul, Lücking & Lumbsch (2016)
- Type locality: Pha Taem National Park, Thailand

= Glaucotrema thailandicum =

Species of lichen-forming fungus

Glaucotrema thailandicum is a species of lichen-forming fungus in the family Graphidaceae. It is a pale green to yellowish green, bark-dwelling lichen with conspicuous, urn-shaped fruiting bodies that are often partly merged, found in dry evergreen forest in Thailand. The species was described in 2016 and is distinguished within Glaucotrema by its ascospores, which are divided internally by both transverse and longitudinal cross-walls.

== Taxonomy ==
Glaucotrema thailandicum was described as a new species in 2016 by Khwanyuruan Naksuwankul, Robert Lücking, and H. Thorsten Lumbsch. It was published in a study reporting five new Graphidaceae species from Thailand, supported by both morphological characters and molecular evidence. The species was characterized as distinct within Glaucotrema by its submuriform (with a few transverse and longitudinal cross-walls) ascospores. The type specimen was collected in Pha Taem National Park, Ubon Ratchathani province, Thailand, and the epithet refers to the country where it was found.

== Description ==
The thallus is endophloeodal to epiphloeodal, pale green to yellowish green, smooth, and up to about 120 μm thick, with a more or less continuous true cortex up to about 25 μm thick. Calcium oxalate crystals are reported as sparse to abundant, and the medulla is usually distinct. Vegetative propagules were not observed.

The fruiting bodies (ascomata) are conspicuous, about 0.8–1.2 mm in diameter (sometimes larger when fused), and may occur singly but more often merge. They become slightly to distinctly raised above the thallus surface and are typically urn-shaped (urceolate). The disc is usually only partly visible from above and is pale yellowish to whitish green. The pore-like openings are broad to gaping, up to about 0.6–0.8 mm wide. The spore-bearing layer (hymenium) is clear and strongly glued together (conglutinated), with a whitish, net-patterned central column (columella). Each ascus contains eight colourless (hyaline), slightly iodine-staining (slightly amyloid) ascospores with a few transverse and longitudinal cross-walls (submuriform, with 3 × 0–1 septa); the spores measure 15–20 × 7.5 µm.

== Habitat and distribution ==
The species is known from Thailand, where the type was collected in dry evergreen forest in Pha Taem National Park (Ubon Ratchathani Province) at 124 m elevation, growing on bark. It is one of three Glaucotrema species that have been recorded in the country (including G. costaricense and G. glaucophaenum).
