= Myriotrema grandisporum =

Scientific classification
- Domain: Eukaryota
- Kingdom: Fungi
- Division: Ascomycota
- Class: Lecanoromycetes
- Order: Graphidales
- Family: Graphidaceae
- Genus: Myriotrema
- Species: M. grandisporum

Binomial name
- Myriotrema grandisporum Homchant. & Coppins (2002)

Species of lichen

Myriotrema grandisporum is a species of corticolous (bark-dwelling) lichen in the family Graphidaceae. Found in Eastern Thailand, it was formally described as a new species in 2002 by lichenologists Natsurang Homchantara and Brian J. Coppins. The type specimen was collected by the first author in Khao Yai National Park (Nakhon Ratchasima Province) at an elevation of 1,430 m (4,690 ft). It is only known to occur at the type locality.

The lichen has a shiny, finely warted (verruculose) thallus with a poorly developed cortex and a white medulla. Its ascospores are thin-walled, somewhat translucent to brown, and spindle-shaped (fusiform), typically measuring 204.5–252.5 long by 17.5–25.5 μm wide. They have a transverse septum and contains from 45 to 49 locules (internal spaces). The lichen contains norstictic acid, a secondary compound that is rare in the genus Myriotrema.
