= Chapsa subsorediata =

Scientific classification
- Kingdom: Fungi
- Division: Ascomycota
- Class: Lecanoromycetes
- Order: Graphidales
- Family: Graphidaceae
- Genus: Chapsa
- Species: C. subsorediata

Binomial name
- Chapsa subsorediata Rivas Plata & Lücking (2012)

Species of lichen-forming fungus

Chapsa subsorediata is a species of bark-dwelling, crustose lichen-forming fungus in the family Graphidaceae. It is a light gray-green lichen with a powdery (sorediate) surface, known only from lowland tropical rainforest in Madre de Dios, Peru. The species was described in 2012 and lacks any detectable lichen substances, which distinguishes it from the otherwise similar Chapsa sorediata.

== Taxonomy ==
Chapsa subsorediata was described as a new species by Eimy Rivas Plata and Robert Lücking in a study of Graphidaceae from the Los Amigos Biological Station area in Amazonian Peru. The species epithet subsorediata alludes to its resemblance to Chapsa sorediata, from which it differs in lacking detectable lichen substances.

== Description ==
This species is a bark-dwelling crustose lichen with a light gray-green thallus up to 5 cm (2 in) across and about 40–70 μm thick. The surface is smooth to uneven and is abundantly sorediate, with white, granular soralia about 0.2–0.5 mm wide. The photobiont is the green alga Trentepohlia. Calcium oxalate crystals are present in the photobiont layer and medulla, and the medulla is indistinct and white.

The fruiting bodies (apothecia) are angular to rounded, sunken in the thallus to partly protruding (immersed to erumpent), and about 0.5–1 mm in diameter. The disc is pale brown and heavily white-pruinose, and the margin is lobulate and also strongly white-pruinose; a columella is absent. Ascospores are produced eight per ascus and are ellipsoid, 5–9-septate, measuring 20–25 × 6–8 μm. No secondary metabolites were detected by thin-layer chromatography, and the thallus was unreactive to standard chemical spot tests (P–, K–).

== Habitat and distribution ==
The species is known from Peru (Madre de Dios), collected at the Los Amigos Research and Training Center (CICRA) in tropical lowland rainforest at about 270 m (890 ft) elevation. It was found growing on tree bark in secondary forest, with collections made in August 2008.
