= Myriotrema frondosolucens =

Scientific classification
- Domain: Eukaryota
- Kingdom: Fungi
- Division: Ascomycota
- Class: Lecanoromycetes
- Order: Graphidales
- Family: Graphidaceae
- Genus: Myriotrema
- Species: M. frondosolucens

Binomial name
- Myriotrema frondosolucens Lücking (2012)

Species of lichen

Myriotrema frondosolucens is a species of corticolous (bark-dwelling) script lichen in the family Graphidaceae. It is found in Costa Rica.

== Taxonomy ==
The lichen was formally described as a new species in 2012 by the German lichenologist Robert Lücking. The type specimen was collected in Costa Rica, within the Puntarenas region at Corcovado National Park, specifically the Los Patos Section and Los Patos Station in the Osa Conservation Area on the Osa Peninsula. This location lies 160 km SSE of San José and 40 km WSW of Golfito. The collection took place at elevations ranging from 100 and 300 m (330 and 980 ft). The specimen was gathered by the author from the bark of branches, both on trees and fallen, in the lowland rainforest zone characterised by closed primary forest, in April 2003. Lücking suggests that the species might not be a genuine member of Myriotrema based on the stictic acid chemistry, "but no convincing alternative placement is available".

== Description ==
Myriotrema frondosolucens lichen has a thallus that varies in colour from light grey-olive to pale yellow-white. Its surface texture ranges from smooth to uneven and it produces specialised structures known as schizidia, which are small, detached pieces of the thallus that help in the reproduction and dispersal of the lichen. These schizidia measure between 0.15 and 0.25 mm in diameter and are surrounded by a loosely arranged outer layer known as the cortex. Beneath the photobiont layer and within the medulla (the innermost layer of the thallus), clusters of calcium oxalate crystals are present. Reproductive structures called apothecia, which would typically contain the spore-producing parts, have not been observed in this species. The chemical composition of Myriotrema frondosolucens includes stictic acid and lichexanthone, substances that contribute to its secondary chemistry.
