= Chapsa granulifera =

Scientific classification
- Domain: Eukaryota
- Kingdom: Fungi
- Division: Ascomycota
- Class: Lecanoromycetes
- Order: Graphidales
- Family: Graphidaceae
- Genus: Chapsa
- Species: C. granulifera

Binomial name
- Chapsa granulifera Frisch & Kalb (2009)

Species of lichen

Chapsa granulifera is a species of corticolous (bark-dwelling), crustose lichen in the family Graphidaceae. Found in Brazil, it was formally described as a new species by Andreas Frisch and Klaus Kalb in 2009. The type specimen was collected by the second author between 100 and 200 km (62 and 124 mi) upstream from Manaus (Amazonas state), in a rainforest along the Rio Negro. It has a pale bluish-grey, velvety thallus measuring 0.02–0.05 mm thick, and a thin brown prothallus. The thallus is covered with yellow, soredia-like granules. It contains constictic acid and stictic acid as major and minor lichen products, respectively.
