= Myriotrema subanamaliense =

Scientific classification
- Domain: Eukaryota
- Kingdom: Fungi
- Division: Ascomycota
- Class: Lecanoromycetes
- Order: Graphidales
- Family: Graphidaceae
- Genus: Myriotrema
- Species: M. subanamaliense

Binomial name
- Myriotrema subanamaliense Homchant. & Coppins (2002)

Species of lichen

Myriotrema subanamaliense is a species of corticolous (bark-dwelling) lichen in the family Graphidaceae. Found in Thailand, it was formally described as a new species in 2002 by lichenologists Natsurang Homchantara and Brian J. Coppins. The type specimen was collected in Namtok Phlio National Park (Chanthaburi Province) on a trail beside Phlio fall. Its distribution in Thailand includes lowland rainforests at elevations between 50 and 80 m (160 and 260 ft), and dry dipterocarp forests at elevations around 600 m (2,000 ft).

Myriotrema subanamaliense has a shiny and smooth, greenish-grey thallus with a dense cortex and a white medulla. It has numerous individual round-pored apothecia, which are immersed in the medulla. The lichen contains constictic and stictic acids, which are secondary chemicals. The specific epithet refers to its resemblance to Myriotrema anamaliense, a lookalike with much larger ascospores.
