= Leucodecton inspersum =

Scientific classification
- Kingdom: Fungi
- Division: Ascomycota
- Class: Lecanoromycetes
- Order: Graphidales
- Family: Graphidaceae
- Genus: Leucodecton
- Species: L. inspersum

Binomial name
- Leucodecton inspersum Rivas Plata & Lücking (2012)
- Type locality: Los Amigos Biological Station Peru

Species of lichen-forming fungus

Leucodecton inspersum is a species of crustose lichen-forming fungus in the family Graphidaceae. It is a pale green-gray, bark-dwelling lichen with tiny, pore-like fruiting bodies, known only from lowland tropical rainforest in Madre de Dios, Peru. The species was described in 2012 and is distinguished from related species by its oil-droplet-filled spore-bearing layer and comparatively large ascospores.

== Taxonomy ==
Leucodecton inspersum was described as a new species by Eimy Rivas Plata and Robert Lücking in 2012, based on material collected at Los Amigos Research and Training Center (CICRA) in the Department of Madre de Dios, Peru. The authors distinguished it from Leucodecton expallescens by its inspersed (oil-droplet-filled) spore-bearing layer (hymenium) and larger ascospores. Its epithet inspersum refers to the characteristic inspersed hymenium.

== Description ==
The body (thallus) is bark-dwelling, pale green-gray, continuous, and up to 5 cm (2 in) across and 80–120 μm thick, with a finely warty (verrucose) surface and a dense outer skin (cortex) of interwoven, elongated cells (prosoplectenchyma). The photobiont is a member of the green algal genus Trentepohlia, with cells about 7–10 × 5–7 μm. The photobiont layer and medulla contain large clusters of calcium oxalate crystals, and the medulla is white.

The fruiting bodies (apothecia) are rounded and sunken to partly protruding from the thallus (immersed-erumpent), about 0.15–0.25 mm in diameter, with a pale brown to flesh-colored disc that is partly hidden beneath a small pore-like opening 0.1–0.2 mm wide. The margin is entire and white, and the proper exciple is distinctly free, forming a double margin. The hymenium is 100–130 μm high and inspersed. The asci are spindle-shaped (fusiform) and measure 100–120 × 15–22 μm. Ascospores number 4–8 per ascus, are colorless, ellipsoid and muriform (divided into multiple chambers by longitudinal and transverse septa), and measure 25–40 × 12–15 μm. They are reported as non-amyloid (I–). The species contains several structurally related lichen products: stictic, constictic, cryptostictic, and hypostictic acids.

== Habitat and distribution ==
The species is known from Amazonian Peru (Madre de Dios), where it was collected at Los Amigos Research and Training Center, about 90 km (56 mi) west of Puerto Maldonado, at 270 m (890 ft) elevation. It was found in tropical lowland rainforest, growing on tree bark in secondary forest.
