= Chapsa hypoconstictica =

Scientific classification
- Kingdom: Fungi
- Division: Ascomycota
- Class: Lecanoromycetes
- Order: Graphidales
- Family: Graphidaceae
- Genus: Chapsa
- Species: C. hypoconstictica

Binomial name
- Chapsa hypoconstictica Rivas Plata & Lücking (2012)
- Type locality:Los Amigos Biological Station, Peru

Species of lichen-forming fungus

Chapsa hypoconstictica is a species of corticolous (bark-dwelling), crustose lichen-forming fungus in the family Graphidaceae. It is a small, light gray-green lichen known only from lowland tropical rainforest in Madre de Dios, Peru, where it grows on tree bark. The species was described in 2012 and is distinguished from related species by containing hypostictic acid as its only lichen substance.

== Taxonomy ==
Chapsa hypoconstictica was described as a new species by Eimy Rivas Plata and Robert Lücking from collections made at Los Amigos Research and Training Center (CICRA) in Madre de Dios, Peru. The species epithet hypoconstictica alludes to the species' unusual chemistry. It is distinguished from Chapsa albomaculata by containing hypostictic acid as its sole lichen substance.

== Description ==
This species is a bark-dwelling crustose lichen with a light gray-green thallus up to 3 cm (1.2 in) across and 40–70 μm thick. The surface is smooth to uneven and may be loosely corticate or partly lacking a cortex. The photosynthetic partner (photobiont) is a member of the green algal genus Trentepohlia, and the photobiont layer and medulla contain clusters of calcium oxalate crystals.

The apothecia are angular-rounded, erumpent, and 0.3–0.6 mm wide, often occurring in clusters of 3–7. The disc is pale brown and white-pruinose, with a lobulate, fused margin; a columella is absent. Ascospores are produced eight per ascus. They are ellipsoid, 5–7-septate, and measure 15–20 × 5–6 μm, with an iodine reaction reported as I+ (violet-blue). The only secondary metabolite reported is hypoconstictic acid.

== Habitat and distribution ==
Chapsa hypoconstictica is known from the type locality in lowland tropical rainforest at about 270 m (890 ft) elevation in Madre de Dios, Peru, where it was collected on tree bark in secondary forest at the Los Amigos Research and Training Center.
