= Chapsa scabiocarpa =

Scientific classification
- Kingdom: Fungi
- Division: Ascomycota
- Class: Lecanoromycetes
- Order: Graphidales
- Family: Graphidaceae
- Genus: Chapsa
- Species: C. scabiocarpa

Binomial name
- Chapsa scabiocarpa Rivas Plata & Lücking (2012)
- Type locality: Los Amigos Biological Station, Peru

Species of lichen-forming fungus

Chapsa scabiocarpa is a species of bark-dwelling, crustose lichen-forming fungus in the family Graphidaceae. It is an olive-green lichen that grows mostly embedded within tree bark in lowland tropical rainforest, and is known only from Madre de Dios, Peru. The species was described in 2012 and is distinguished by the layered, fissured margin of its fruiting bodies.

== Taxonomy ==
Chapsa scabiocarpa was described as a new species by Eimy Rivas Plata and Robert Lücking from collections made in August 2008 at Los Amigos Biological Station in Madre de Dios, Peru. The species epithet refers to the distinctly layered margin of the apothecia.

== Description ==
The thallus of Chapsa scabiocarpa is bark-dwelling, olive-green, continuous, and mostly grows within the bark layers endoperidermal, reaching up to 3 cm across and about 30–50 μm thick. Its surface is smooth to uneven and has a loose, irregular cortex; the photobiont is Trentepohlia.

Apothecia are angular-rounded and immersed-erumpent, about 0.3–0.5 mm in diameter, and may occur singly or in small fused groups. The disc is pale gray-brown and white-pruinose, and the margin is fissured-lobulate and distinctly layered. A columella is absent. Ascospores are ellipsoid, colorless, and amyloid (I+ violet-blue), with 5–7 septa and dimensions of 20–25 × 7–8 μm; eight spores occur per ascus. No lichen substances were detected by thin-layer chromatography.

== Habitat and distribution ==
The species is known only from its type locality in lowland tropical rainforest at about 270 m (890 ft) elevation in Madre de Dios, Peru, where it was collected on tree bark in secondary forest at the Los Amigos Research and Training Center.
