= Myriotrema endoflavescens =

Scientific classification
- Kingdom: Fungi
- Division: Ascomycota
- Class: Lecanoromycetes
- Order: Graphidales
- Family: Graphidaceae
- Genus: Myriotrema
- Species: M. endoflavescens

Binomial name
- Myriotrema endoflavescens Hale ex Lücking (2011)

Species of lichen-forming fungus

Myriotrema endoflavescens is a rare species of lichen-forming fungus in the family Graphidaceae. The species was originally discovered by American lichenologist Mason Hale in 1975, but was not formally described until 2011 when Robert Lücking published Hale's work. It forms a light yellow-olive crust on tree bark with small, rounded fruiting bodies embedded in the surface, and is distinguished by its unusual pale-yellow inner tissue. The lichen is known only from a single location in Panama's primary rainforest at about 800 meters elevation.

== Taxonomy ==
Myriotrema endoflavescens was first recognized by the American lichenologist Mason Hale, who collected the type specimen in western Panama in 1975 and planned to describe it as new. Because his manuscript was never published, the name was validly established later by Robert Lücking, who retained Hale's unpublished epithet and diagnosis. Within Myriotrema—a diverse, bark‐dwelling genus of the Graphidaceae—this species is allied to the chemically non-reactive group that includes M. album, M. myrioporum, and M. subconforme. It differs from those relatives in having a pale-yellow medulla (the inner tissue of the thallus) and apothecia that lack even a rudimentary columella. All other known Myriotrema species have a white medulla; pigmented medullae are otherwise characteristic of the separate genus Ocellularia. Spore characters overlap with the allied taxa, so thallus pigmentation and the absence of a columella are the key field and microscopic traits that set the species apart.

== Description ==
The thallus forms a light yellow-olive crust on bark. Its surface is mostly smooth but can develop low, blister-like swellings that give parts of the crust a gall-forming aspect. A dense outer skin (prosoplectenchymatous cortex) sometimes splits internally, and both the photobiont layer and the pale-yellow medulla contain clusters of calcium oxalate crystals that sparkle under polarized light. Standard spot tests are negative, yet a potassium hydroxide droplet turns the medulla yellow, confirming the presence of an otherwise undetected yellow pigment.

Apothecia—small, rounded fruiting bodies—are immersed in the crust and measure 0.2–0.4 mm across. Each apothecium is roofed by a narrow pore 0.1–0.2 mm wide; its rim is light yellow and the interior surface is flesh-colored and dusted with a fine white frost (pruina). Unlike several others in the genus, the species has no columella, the sterile pillar that can rise from the apothecial floor in many Myriotrema. The wall of the apothecium (excipulum) is built of tightly interwoven fungal threads (hyphae) and is yellow-brown in section. The spore-bearing layer (hymenium) is 60–80 micrometres (μm) tall and contains unbranched paraphyses. Each club-shaped ascus holds eight ellipsoid ascospores that are 15–20 × 5–7 μm, divided by three to five internal cross-walls. The spores stain violet-blue in iodine (an amyloid reaction), a common diagnostic feature in this family.

== Habitat and distribution ==
Myriotrema endoflavescens is known only from the type locality in Veraguas Province, Panama, where it was collected on tree bark at roughly 800 m elevation in lower-montane primary rainforest.
