= Pseudochapsa aptrootiana =

Scientific classification
- Domain: Eukaryota
- Kingdom: Fungi
- Division: Ascomycota
- Class: Lecanoromycetes
- Order: Graphidales
- Family: Graphidaceae
- Genus: Pseudochapsa
- Species: P. aptrootiana

Binomial name
- Pseudochapsa aptrootiana M.Cáceres, T.A.Pereira & Lücking (2018)

Species of lichen

Pseudochapsa aptrootiana is a species of corticolous (bark-dwelling) in the family Graphidaceae. Found in Brazil, it was formally described as a new species in 2018 by Marcela Eugenia da Silva Cáceres, Thamires Almeida Pereira, and Robert Lücking. The type specimen was collected from Mata do Cipó (Capela e Siriri, Sergipe) at an elevation of 80–100 m (260–330 ft); here, in an Atlantic Rainforest remnant, it was found in the forest understory. It has a light grey thallus lacking a prothallus and a cortex. Its ascospores, which number eight per ascus, are oblong to spindle-shaped (fusiform) with between 11 and 15 septa and measure 30–35 by 7–8 μm. Lichen products that occur in Pseudochapsa aptrootiana include stictic and constictic acid as major or submajor metabolites, and minor to trace amounts of cryptostictic, hypostictic, and acetylhypoconstictic acids. The species epithet honours Dutch lichenologist André Aptroot, "for his invaluable contributions to tropical lichenology".
