= Fibrillithecis =

Scientific classification
- Domain: Eukaryota
- Kingdom: Fungi
- Division: Ascomycota
- Class: Lecanoromycetes
- Order: Graphidales
- Family: Graphidaceae
- Genus: Fibrillithecis; Frisch (2006)

Type species
- Fibrillithecis vernicosa (Zahlbr.) Frisch (2006)

Species
- See text

Genus of lichen-forming fungi

Fibrillithecis is a genus of lichen-forming fungi in the family Graphidaceae. The genus was circumscribed in 2006 by the German lichenologist Andreas Frisch, with Fibrillithecis vernicosa assigned as the type species.

== Species ==
As of July 2024, Species Fungorum (in the Catalogue of Life) accepts 15 species of Fibrillithecis:

- Fibrillithecis argentea (Müll.Arg.) Rivas Plata & Lücking (2010)
- Fibrillithecis carneodisca (Hale) Rivas Plata & Lücking (2010)
- Fibrillithecis confusa Lücking, Kalb & Rivas Plata (2010)
- Fibrillithecis dehiscens (Leight.) Mangold, Lücking & Lumbsch (2011)
- Fibrillithecis diminita (Hale) Rivas Plata & Lücking (2010)
- Fibrillithecis eximia (R.C.Harris) Rivas Plata & Lücking (2010)
- Fibrillithecis fissurata (Nagarkar & Hale) Rivas Plata & Lücking (2010)
- Fibrillithecis gibbosa (H.Magn.) Rivas Plata & Lücking (2010)
- Fibrillithecis halei (Tuck. & Mont.) Mangold (2009)
- Fibrillithecis insignis (Zahlbr.) Frisch (2006)
- Fibrillithecis inspersa Kalb (2009)
- Fibrillithecis pachystoma (Nyl.) Sipman (2012)
- Fibrillithecis platyspora (Harm.) Frisch (2006)
- Fibrillithecis sprucei Mangold, Lücking & Lumbsch (2011)
- Fibrillithecis vernicosa (Zahlbr.) Frisch (2006)
