= Pseudochapsa =

Scientific classification
- Kingdom: Fungi
- Division: Ascomycota
- Class: Lecanoromycetes
- Order: Graphidales
- Family: Graphidaceae
- Genus: Pseudochapsa; Parnmen, Lücking & Lumbsch (2012)

Type species
- Pseudochapsa dilatata (Müll.Arg.) Parnmen, Lücking & Lumbsch (2012)

Species
- See text

Genus of lichen-forming fungi

Pseudochapsa is a genus of lichen-forming fungi in the family Graphidaceae. It has 19 species. It was circumscribed in 2012 by Sittiporn Parnmen, Robert Lücking, and Helge Thorsten Lumbsch, with Pseudochapsa dilatata as the type species. Pseudochapsa differs from Chapsa (the genus from which it was segregated) it that its excipulum (the rim of tissue around the apothecia) is typically brown. Additionally, its ascospores are mostly discoseptate and amyloid. The generic name combines the Greek pseudo ("false") with the genus name Chapsa.

== Species ==
- Pseudochapsa albomaculata (Sipman) Parnmen, Lücking & Lumbsch (2012)
- Pseudochapsa amylospora M.Cáceres, Aptroot & Lücking (2014)
- Pseudochapsa aptrootiana M.Cáceres, T.A.Pereira & Lücking (2018)
- Pseudochapsa crispata (Müll.Arg.) Parnmen, Lücking & Lumbsch (2012)
- Pseudochapsa dilatata (Müll.Arg.) Parnmen, Lücking & Lumbsch (2012)
- Pseudochapsa esslingeri (Hale) Parnmen, Lücking & Lumbsch (2012)
- Pseudochapsa isidiifera (Frisch & Kalb) Parnmen, Lücking & Lumbsch (2012)
- Pseudochapsa kalbii (Frisch) Parnmen, Lücking & Lumbsch (2012)
- Pseudochapsa lueckingii (Kalb) Parnmen, Lücking & Lumbsch (2012)
- Pseudochapsa phlyctidea (Nyl.) Parnmen, Lücking & Lumbsch (2012)
- Pseudochapsa phlyctidioides (Müll.Arg.) Parnmen, Lücking & Lumbsch (2012)
- Pseudochapsa pseudoexanthismocarpa (Patw. & C.R.Kulk.) Parnmen, Lücking & Lumbsch (2012)
- Pseudochapsa pseudoschizostoma (Hale) Parnmen, Lücking & Lumbsch (2012)
- Pseudochapsa rhizophorae (Kalb) Parnmen, Lücking & Lumbsch (2012)
- Pseudochapsa rivas-platae (Kalb & Lücking) Parnmen, Lücking & Lumbsch (2012)
- Pseudochapsa sipmanii (Frisch & Kalb) Parnmen, Lücking & Lumbsch (2012)
- Pseudochapsa subdactylifera (Sipman) Lücking (2014)
- Pseudochapsa subpatens (Hale) Parnmen, Lücking & Lumbsch (2012)
