= Chapsa inconspicua =

Scientific classification
- Kingdom: Fungi
- Division: Ascomycota
- Class: Lecanoromycetes
- Order: Graphidales
- Family: Graphidaceae
- Genus: Chapsa
- Species: C. inconspicua

Binomial name
- Chapsa inconspicua Lücking, B.Moncada & Álvaro (2023)
- Type locality: Araracuara, Colombia

Species of lichen-forming fungus

Chapsa inconspicua is a species of crustose lichen-forming fungus in the family Graphidaceae. It is a whitish, bark-dwelling lichen with distinctive flesh-coloured fruiting bodies surrounded by small, triangular lobes of thallus tissue. The species was described in 2023 from the Colombian Amazon, where it was found in secondary vegetation near Araracuara.

== Taxonomy ==
Chapsa inconspicua was described as a new species in 2023 by Robert Lücking, Bibiana Moncada, and Wilson Ricardo Álvaro-Alba from material collected in Colombia (Araracuara, Caquetá Department). The original description compared it with Chapsa angustispora, from which it was separated by differences in thallus texture and ascospore size.

== Description ==
The lichen forms a crust-like body (thallus) on bark, up to 5 cm (2 in) across and about 20–30 μm thick. The surface is whitish and smooth to uneven; no visible border zone (prothallus) was observed. In cross-section, the thallus lacks an outer skin (cortex) and has a scattered algal layer embedded within the bark tissue (periderm). The algal partner (photobiont) is from the green algal genus Trentepohlia.

The fruiting bodies (ascomata) partly protrude from the thallus (erumpent) and are of the chroodiscoid type (with a broad, exposed disc surrounded by lobed thallus tissue), about 0.5–1 mm long and 0.15–0.2 mm high. The disc is exposed and flesh-colored, with a thin white frosting (pruina). The inner fungal rim (proper margin) is indistinct, while the outer thallus-derived rim (thalline margin) curves outward and is divided into 4–7 triangular to irregular lobelets (lobules).

== Habitat and distribution ==
The species is known from the type locality in Colombia, in Caquetá Department (Araracuara area), where it was collected at about 300 m (980 ft) elevation in secondary vegetation and gardens, growing on the bark of a small tree.
