= Chapsa thallotrema =

Scientific classification
- Kingdom: Fungi
- Division: Ascomycota
- Class: Lecanoromycetes
- Order: Graphidales
- Family: Graphidaceae
- Genus: Chapsa
- Species: C. thallotrema

Binomial name
- Chapsa thallotrema Lücking & N.Salazar (2011)

Species of lichen

Chapsa thallotrema is a species of lichen in the family Graphidaceae. The lichen forms grey-olive crusts on tree bark marked by distinctive white to bluish-white powdery patches that stand out against the darker background. It appears to be widespread across the Neotropics, with confirmed records from Panama, Costa Rica, Brazil, Venezuela, and Bolivia.

== Taxonomy ==
Chapsa thallotrema was described in 2011 by Robert Lücking and Noris Salazar from material collected in the shady understory of Altos de Campana National Park, Panamá. The species belongs to the Chapsa sublilacina complex, in which four morphs are recognised according to the presence or absence of stictic acid derivatives and by the size and appearance of the soralia (powdery reproductive patches). The form treated here bears large, compact, finely granular soralia and contains stictic acid, making it the sorediate counterpart of C. sublilacina, whereas the morph with small, coarse soralia lacks detectable secondary metabolites. The epithet thallotrema honours an unpublished provisional name, "Thallotrema antillarum", used by the American lichenologist Henry Andrew Imshaug and students for similar Caribbean specimens.

== Description ==
The lichen forms a grey-olive crust (thallus) that can exceed 7 cm across and is only 30–70 micrometre (μm) thick. Its surface is smooth to slightly uneven, underlain by a dense, tissue-like cortex whose layers have begun to split internally. Numerous discrete soralia, each 1–2 mm wide, erupt through the surface; they are cap-shaped, finely powdery and white to bluish-white or yellowish-white, standing out sharply against the darker background. Microscopic sections show clusters of calcium oxalate crystals scattered through the algal zone or medulla. The photobiont is a filamentous green alga of the genus Trentepohlia.

Fruiting bodies are rounded to angular apothecia that break through the thallus (erumpent) and reach up to 5 mm across, though most are 1–3 mm. Their discs are exposed, flesh-coloured to pink-purple, and surrounded by a lobed, sometimes layered margin that is pale beige when young. The supporting excipulum consists of colourless, brick-like cells, and short sterile filaments (periphysoids) line the ostiole. The hymenium is 150–200 μm tall; within it run simple, unbranched paraphyses. Each ascus contains two to four large ascospores that are cylindrical, colourless and divided by 15–19 internal cross-walls; they measure 60–120 × 10–15 μm and stain violet-blue with iodine, indicating an amyloid wall layer. Thin-layer chromatography detects stictic acid and related compounds, which produce a yellow reaction with potassium hydroxide solution (K+ yellow).

== Habitat and distribution ==
Chapsa thallotrema appears to be widespread across the Neotropical realm, with confirmed collections from Panamá, Costa Rica, Brazil, Venezuela, and Bolivia, and earlier, unpublished records from the wider Caribbean. Specimens come from the shaded trunks of large trees in lowland to lower-montane rainforest, between about 500 and 800 m elevation.
