= Myriotrema whalleyanum =

Scientific classification
- Domain: Eukaryota
- Kingdom: Fungi
- Division: Ascomycota
- Class: Lecanoromycetes
- Order: Graphidales
- Family: Graphidaceae
- Genus: Myriotrema
- Species: M. whalleyanum

Binomial name
- Myriotrema whalleyanum Homchant. & Coppins (2002)

Species of lichen

Myriotrema whalleyanum is a species of corticolous (bark-dwelling) lichen in the family Graphidaceae. Found in Thailand, it was formally described as a new species in 2002 by lichenologists Natsurang Homchantara and Brian J. Coppins. The type specimen was collected from Doi Suthep National Park (Chiang Mai Province) at an elevation of 1,550 m (5,090 ft); it prefers growing on foliose lichens or mats of moss. The lichen has a smooth and shiny, pale straw-coloured thallus with a dense cortex and a white medulla. It makes large, colourless and thick-walled muriform (chambered) ascospores typically measuring 84–105.5 by 22.5–30.5 μm. Myriotrema whalleyanum does not contain any lichen products. The specific epithet honours Anthony Whalley, emeritus professor at Liverpool John Moores University.
