= Chapsa microspora =

Scientific classification
- Kingdom: Fungi
- Division: Ascomycota
- Class: Lecanoromycetes
- Order: Graphidales
- Family: Graphidaceae
- Genus: Chapsa
- Species: C. microspora

Binomial name
- Chapsa microspora Kalb (2011)
- Holotype: along the Rio Negro (Amazon), Brazil

Species of lichen

Chapsa microspora is a species of corticolous (bark-dwelling), crustose lichen in the family Graphidaceae. Found in Brazil, it was described as new to science in 2011 by the German lichenologist Klaus Kalb. The species epithet microspora refers to its relatively small ascospores.

== Description ==
Chapsa microspora is a species of crustose lichen that grows on tree bark. Its thin thallus (the main body of the lichen) appears light grey to whitish and has a smooth, continuous surface roughly 20–50 μm thick. Unlike some lichens, it lacks a protective outer cortex layer, instead growing partially within the tree's outer bark tissue.

The reproductive structures (apothecia) are round and measure 0.6–1.2 mm across, typically appearing in clusters of 1–3. These apothecia have distinctive raised margins that are deeply split and usually curl backward, revealing a pale grey to white felty inner surface. The central disc is pale brown and covered with a white, powdery coating (pruina).

When viewed under a microscope, the spore-producing layer (hymenium) is clear and 50–60 μm tall. The thread-like structures (paraphyses) within are unbranched, straight, and 2–2.5 micrometers wide, with tips that may be slightly beaded or branched. Each spore sac (ascus) contains 6–8 colourless spores arranged in 2–3 rows. The individual spores are thick-walled with rounded ends and typically have 3 cross-walls, measuring 7–9 by 4 μm.

Chemical analysis reveals that C. microspora produces several lichen substances, primarily stictic and constictic acids, with trace amounts of hypostictic and hypoconstictic acids.
