= Chapsa rubropulveracea =

Scientific classification
- Kingdom: Fungi
- Division: Ascomycota
- Class: Lecanoromycetes
- Order: Graphidales
- Family: Graphidaceae
- Genus: Chapsa
- Species: C. rubropulveracea

Binomial name
- Chapsa rubropulveracea Hale ex Mangold, Lücking & Lumbsch (2011)

Species of lichen-forming fungus

Chapsa rubropulveracea is a species of corticolous (bark-dwelling) crustose lichen in the family Graphidaceae. This distinctive lichen is easily recognized by its flour-like white surface and bright red powdery coating on its small reproductive discs. It was originally collected in 1972 by the American lichenologist Mason Hale on the Caribbean island of Dominica, but was not formally described and named until 2011. The species is currently known only from its original discovery site in humid mountain forests at about 400 metres elevation, where it grows on the bark of hardwood trees.

== Taxonomy ==
Chapsa rubropulveracea was first collected in May 1972 on Dominica by the American lichenologist Mason E. Hale, who intended to describe it in the genus Thelotrema. Hale's draft name, however, never reached publication. Four decades later the species was formally validated in Chapsa by Armin Mangold, Robert Lücking and H. Thorsten Lumbsch, who kept Hale's epithet to mark the lichen's distinctive red "powder-dust" covering on its fruiting discs. The authors compared the new species with a handful of other Chapsa species that combine a pruina-dusted thallus, transversely septate, colourless spores and a pigmented apothecial disc. Within this group C. rubropulveracea is set apart by its dull crimson pruina, the absence of any metabolites detectable by thin-layer chromatography, and its relatively small ascospores (15–20 μm long). Its sister species appear to be C. farinosa from Costa Rica, which lacks a disc pigment and has larger spores, and C. waasii, whose apothecia are violet rather than red.

== Description ==
The lichen forms a thin, continuous crust on bark, rarely exceeding five centimetres across. Viewed from above the thallus surface is pale grey-white and distinctly farinose—rather like it has been dusted with flour—because the outermost fungal cells break up into minute grains. A vertical section reveals no protective upper cortex; instead the algal layer lies directly under the surface, interspersed with little clumps of calcium oxalate crystals that provide a granular feel.

Reproductive structures are plentiful. The apothecia begin beneath the thallus and push through so that their angular, one-millimetre discs sit flush with the surface. Each disc is blanketed by a crimson red powder (pruina), while the surrounding rim consists of fused, lobule-like projections that share the thallus colour and are themselves lightly frosted in white. Internally the rim is a compact weave of colourless fungal hyphae; tiny periphysoids fringe the opening. The clear hymenium stands 50–70 μm tall and is capped by a layer of the same red crystals, which dissolve to a violet-purple flush when touched with potassium hydroxide solution. Paraphyses are simple, and each club-shaped ascus contains eight ascospores. The spores are oblong, divided by five to seven cross-walls, 15–20 μm long by 5–6 μm wide, and remain colourless when stained with iodine.

Chapsa wolseleyana resembles C. rubropulveracea in having angular apothecia dusted with crimson-to-purple pruina, but the two diverge in several key characters: C. wolseleyana develops a loose but definite thallus cortex, whereas C. rubropulveracea has a cortex-less, floury surface; the former produces a single, very large muriform spore (120–150 × 30–35 μm, eventually olive-brown) per ascus, while the latter yields eight much smaller, 5–7-septate, permanently colourless spores only 15–20 × 5–6 μm; chemically both pigments turn violet in KOH, yet C. wolseleyana also releases a yellow-green efflux indicative of isohypocrelline; and biogeographically they are far apart, the Dominican C. rubropulveracea occurring on smooth low-montane bark, whereas C. wolseleyana is known solely from a single mossy-montane site in Sri Lanka, growing on exposed twigs.

== Habitat and distribution ==
Chapsa rubropulveracea is known only from its type locality on the leeward side of Dominica, where it grew on the trunks of hardwoods at about 400 metres elevation. Barber's Block, the hill from which the holotype was taken, supports lower-montane rain-forest vegetation and experiences frequent mist. The species is therefore assumed to favour humid, shaded bark in tropical mid-elevation forests. No additional records have yet come to light, but allied Chapsa species are often overlooked owing to their small size and cryptic habits.
