= Phaeotrema =

Scientific classification
- Domain: Eukaryota
- Kingdom: Fungi
- Division: Ascomycota
- Class: Lecanoromycetes
- Order: Graphidales
- Family: Graphidaceae
- Genus: Phaeotrema; Müll.Arg. (1887)

Type species
- Phaeotrema subfarinosum (Fée) Müll.Arg. (1887)

Synonyms
- Asteristion Leight. (1870); Eupropolis De Not. (1863); Janseella Henn. (1899); Thelotrema sect. Asteristion (Leight.) Tat.Matsumoto (2000)

Genus of lichen-forming fungi

Phaeotrema is a genus of lichen-forming fungi in the family Graphidaceae. The genus was circumscribed in 1887 by Johannes Müller Argoviensis, with P. subfarinosum assigned as the type species.

== Species ==
As of March 2023, Species Fungorum (in the Catalogue of Life) accepts 20 species of Phaeotrema.

- Phaeotrema apertum C.W.Dodge (1964)
- Phaeotrema chlorosporum Zahlbr. (1928)
- Phaeotrema disciforme (Leight.) Hale (1974)
- Phaeotrema discissum (Nyl.) Patw. & C.R.Kulk. (1981)
- Phaeotrema erumpens (Leight.) R.Sant. (1952)
- Phaeotrema feeanum (A.Massal.) Zahlbr. (1923)
- Phaeotrema foraminulosum (Kremp.) Zahlbr. (1923)
- Phaeotrema fuscescens (Kremp.) Zahlbr. (1923)
- Phaeotrema glyphidellum (Stirt.) Zahlbr. (1923)
- Phaeotrema leucastrum (Tuck.) Zahlbr. (1923)
- Phaeotrema limae (Vain.) Zahlbr. (1939)
- Phaeotrema microcarpa Szatala (1955)
- Phaeotrema pachysporum (Nyl.) Zahlbr. (1923)
- Phaeotrema palmense (Vain.) Zahlbr. (1939)
- Phaeotrema phaeospermoides (Vain.) Zahlbr. (1923)
- Phaeotrema pictetianum Müll.Arg. (1891)
- Phaeotrema sticticum Hale (1975)
- Phaeotrema subfarinosum (Fée) Müll.Arg. (1887)
- Phaeotrema subinalbescens (Nyl.) Zahlbr. (1923)
- Phaeotrema uber Hue (1916)
