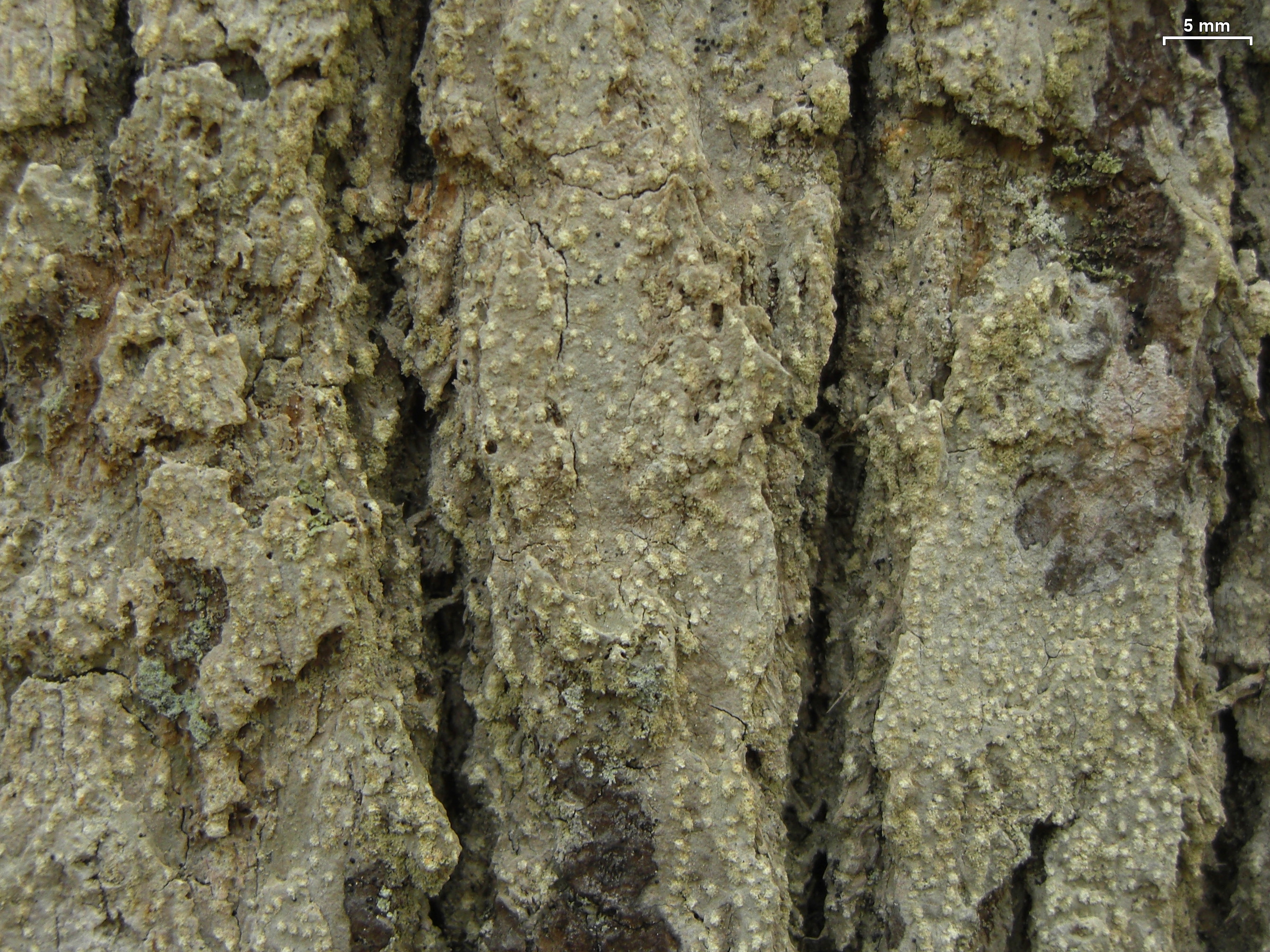
- Nadvornikiana sorediata in North Carolina

Scientific classification
- Domain: Eukaryota
- Kingdom: Fungi
- Division: Ascomycota
- Class: Lecanoromycetes
- Order: Graphidales
- Family: Graphidaceae
- Genus: Nadvornikia; Tibell (1984)

Type species
- Nadvornikia hawaiiensis (Tuck.) Tibell (1984)

Species
- N. diplotylia N. expallescens N. hawaiensis N. peninsulae N. sorediata

= Nadvornikia =

Genus of lichen-forming fungi

Nadvornikia is a genus of lichen-forming fungi in the family Graphidaceae. Species in the genus are corticolous (bark-dwelling) and crustose.

== Taxonomy ==
The genus was circumscribed in 1984 by lichenologist Leif Tibell, with N. hawaiensis assigned as the type species. Nadvornikia is a replacement name for Stephanophoron, which was published illegitimately by Czech lichenologist Josef Nádvorník in 1942 (because the fungal genus Stephanophorus already occupied that name). The genus name pays tribute to Nádvorník (1906–1977), the first to recognize the type species of this genus as representing a distinct evolutionary lineage, separate from other similar lichens.

== Description ==
Nadvornikia species have a continuous, epiperidermal thallus. The surface of the thallus can be smooth or uneven, and no prothallus is present. The cortex, which is absent or loosely arranged, features an irregular photobiont layer with Trentepohlia green algal cells and calcium oxalate crystals. The medulla is endoperidermal (located within the periderm. Vegetative propagules in Nadvornikia lichens may be absent or present as soredia. The ascomata are rounded and can be either immersed or sessile, with or without a mazaedium. The proper margin may be entire or fissured, while the thalline margin is always entire. The excipulum is prosoplectenchymatous and entire, while the columella is absent. The hypothecium is also prosoplectenchymatous and hyaline. The hymenium is hyaline and clear, while the epithecium can be thin or indistinct.

The paraphyses are unbranched and have smooth tips, with no periphysoids present. The asci are fusiform, and each contains eight ascospores. These ascospores can be either hyaline or dark brown, 1-septate to somewhat muriform, distoseptate, and non-amyloid. Conidiomata have not been observed in Nadvornikia lichens.

The secondary chemistry of Nadvornikia lichens includes stictic acid and various related lichen substances.

== Species ==
As of March 2023, Species Fungorum (in the Catalogue of Life) accepts three species of Nadvornikia; an additional two species have been formally described and published.

- Nadvornikia diplotylia (Nyl.) G.Pant & D.D.Awasthi (1989)
- Nadvornikia expallescens (Nyl.) I.Medeiros, Lücking & Lumbsch (2017)
- Nadvornikia hawaiensis (Tuck.) Tibell (1984)
- Nadvornikia peninsulae (R.C.Harris) I.Medeiros, Lücking & Lumbsch (2017)
- Nadvornikia sorediata R.C.Harris (1990)
