= Leucodecton =

Scientific classification
- Kingdom: Fungi
- Division: Ascomycota
- Class: Lecanoromycetes
- Order: Graphidales
- Family: Graphidaceae
- Genus: Leucodecton; A.Massal. (1860)

Type species
- Leucodecton compunctum (Ach.) A.Massal. (1860)

Genus of lichen-forming fungi

Leucodecton is a genus of lichen-forming fungi in the family Graphidaceae. These lichens form thin, cream to pale brown crusts on bark or rock surfaces and reproduce through flask-shaped fruiting bodies that often appear in small, wart-like clusters. The genus currently includes more than 30 species found worldwide, with many recently described from tropical regions such as Sri Lanka and Costa Rica.

== Taxonomy ==
The genus was circumscribed in 1860 by Swiss lichenologist Abramo Bartolommeo Massalongo, with Leucodecton compunctum assigned as the type species.

== Description ==
Leucodecton forms a thin, crust-like thallus that lies flat on the bark or rock surface. Its upper layer is usually cream to pale fawn; the outer "skin" (cortex) is only weakly developed, giving the surface a smooth to slightly knobbly look. Large, irregular crystals may be embedded in the interior, but the border (prothallus) that some lichens display is missing. Vegetative propagules used for asexual spread—powdery soredia or tiny finger-like isidia—occasionally occur. The photosynthetic partner is a filamentous green alga from the genus Trentepohlia, which lends an orange tint when exposed in damaged areas.

The reproductive bodies are flask- to urn-shaped apothecia that start out immersed in the thallus and often push up in small wart-like clusters. Their black discs are usually concave, sometimes dusted with a grey bloom (pruina), and are framed by a rim of thallus tissue (thalline exciple) that may split irregularly as the fruiting body matures. Beneath this rim lies a true exciple—an internal ring of densely intertwined fungal hyphae—seen in a view from above. Within the apothecium, the colourless hymenium houses slender asci, each with a single functional wall layer that thickens abruptly at the tip. The asci typically hold one to eight ascospores.

Spores are elongated to spindle-shaped, with several internal walls; they begin colourless and thin-walled but often darken and develop thick, laminated walls as they age. No conidiomata (structures that produce asexual spores) have been observed. Chemically, most species produce stictic or norstictic acid, secondary metabolites that are useful for species identification through thin-layer chromatography.

== Species ==
As of June 2025, Species Fungorum (in the Catalogue of Life) accepts 32 species of Leucodecton:

- Leucodecton albidulum (Nyl.) Mangold (2009)
- Leucodecton album Lücking & Sipman (2012)
- Leucodecton anamalaiense (Patw. & C.R.Kulk.) Rivas Plata & Lücking (2010)
- Leucodecton biokoense Frisch (2006)
- Leucodecton bisporum (Nyl.) Sipman & Lücking (2012)
- Leucodecton canescens Weerakoon, Lücking & Lumbsch (2014) – Sri Lanka
- Leucodecton compunctellum (Nyl.) Frisch (2006)
- Leucodecton compunctum (Ach.) A.Massal. (1860)
- Leucodecton confusum Paupong, Lumbsch & Lücking (2014)
- Leucodecton coppinsii (Homchant.) Weerakoon, Lücking & Lumbsch (2014)
- Leucodecton dactyliferum (Hale) Lücking (2012)
- Leucodecton desquamescens (Vain.) Lücking (2010)
- Leucodecton elachistoteron (Leight.) Frisch (2006)
- Leucodecton fissurinum (Hale) Frisch (2006)
- Leucodecton fuscomarginatum Weerakoon, Lücking & Lumbsch (2014) – Sri Lanka
- Leucodecton glaucescens (Nyl.) Frisch (2006)
- Leucodecton granulosum Sipman (2018)
- Leucodecton inspersum Rivas Plata & Lücking (2012)
- Leucodecton isidioides (Borrer) Lücking & Breuss (2012)
- Leucodecton minisporum Lücking (2015)
- Leucodecton nuwarense (Hale) Frisch (2006)
- Leucodecton occultum (Eschw.) Frisch (2006)
- Leucodecton oxysporum (Redinger) Lücking (2010)
- Leucodecton phaeosporum (Nyl.) Rivas Plata & Lücking (2010)
- Leucodecton pseudostromaticum Papong, Lücking & Lumbsch (2014)
- Leucodecton pustulatum L.I.Ferraro, Lücking, Aptroot & M.Cáceres (2014)
- Leucodecton sordidescens (Fée) Lücking & Sipman (2012)
- Leucodecton sorediiferum Frisch (2006)
- Leucodecton subcompunctum (Nyl.) Frisch (2006)
- Leucodecton tarmuguliense (Sethy, Nagarkar & Patw.) Frisch (2006)
- Leucodecton uatumense Lücking (2015)
- Leucodecton willeyi (Nyl.) R.C.Harris (2014)
