= Chapsa =

Scientific classification
- Domain: Eukaryota
- Kingdom: Fungi
- Division: Ascomycota
- Class: Lecanoromycetes
- Order: Graphidales
- Family: Graphidaceae
- Genus: Chapsa; A.Massal. (1860)

Type species
- Chapsa indicum A.Massal. (1860)

Genus of lichens

Chapsa is a genus of lichens in the family Graphidaceae. These lichens form thin, grey-whitish to pale olive crusts on tree bark and are characterized by fruiting bodies that start as slits but expand into round to angular discs level with the surface, each bordered by a pale rim. The genus has a pantropical to warm-temperate distribution, growing on shaded bark in humid lowland or foothill rainforests, with over 60 species that often serve as indicators of undisturbed forest habitats.

== Taxonomy ==
The genus was circumscribed by the Italian lichenologist Abramo Bartolommeo Massalongo in 1860. The genus was resurrected by Frisch and colleagues in 2006 to include species earlier classified in Chroodiscus, Myriotrema, Ocellularia, and Thelotrema.

== Description ==
Chapsa forms a thin, grey-whitish to pale olive crust (thallus) lacking a true cortex. Its ascomata are chroodiscoid: they start as slits but expand into round to angular discs level with the thallus, each bordered by a pale, partly free excipulum armed with tiny periphysoids. The clear hymenium has branched "Chapsa-type" paraphyses, is iodine-negative (I–), and houses eight hyaline ascospores that are transversely 3–15-septate; a few species develop longer, somewhat muriform spores. Most lack secondary metabolites, though some produce norstictic acid or stictic acid that tint the discs orange-brown.

Molecular work has split off allied genera (e.g., Astrochapsa, Pseudochapsa, Nitidochapsa) for lineages with divergent chemistries or spores, yet all share the chroodiscoid discs, periphysoids and branched paraphyses diagnostic for the group. Over 60 species remain in Chapsa, and discoveries such as C. murioelongata show that diversity is still being revealed.

== Ecology ==
Chapsa has a pantropical to warm-temperate distribution, growing on shaded bark below about 1000 m elevation in humid lowland or foothill rainforests; some species extend into montane cloud forests above 2000 m. Its preference for moist, mature forest canopies means several species serve as indicators of undisturbed habitat, and surveys in China, Brazil and India continue to uncover narrowly endemic taxa.

== Species ==
- Chapsa albida (Nyl.) Lücking & Sipman (2010)
- Chapsa alborosella (Nyl.) Frisch (2006)
- Chapsa alletii Diederich & Ertz (2020)
- Chapsa angustispora E.L.Lima, Lücking & M.Cáceres (2016)
- Chapsa boninensis (Tat.Matsumoto) Rivas Plata & Mangold (2010)
- CChapsa canaimae Kalb (2020)
- Chapsa chionostoma (Nyl.) Rivas Plata & Mangold (2010)
- Chapsa cinchonarum (Fée) Frisch (2006)
- Chapsa constrictospora Aptroot, Lücking & M.Cáceres (2023) – Brazil
- Chapsa defecta Lücking (2012)
- Chapsa defectosorediata Lücking (2012)
- Chapsa diorygmoides Aptroot, Lücking & M.Cáceres (2023) – Brazil
- Chapsa diploschistoides (Zahlbr.) Frisch (2006)
- Chapsa discoides (Stirt.) Lücking (2012)
- Chapsa dissuta (Hale) Mangold (2009)
- Chapsa eitenii (Hale) Frisch (2006)
- Chapsa elabens (Müll.Arg.) Rivas Plata & Mangold (2010)
- Chapsa farinosa Lücking & Sipman (2012)
- Chapsa francisci Sipman (2014)
- Chapsa granulifera Frisch & Kalb (2009)
- Chapsa halei Mangold (2009)
- Chapsa hiata (Hale) Sipman (2012)
- Chapsa hypoconstictica Rivas Plata & Lücking (2012)
- Chapsa imperfecta (Hale) Rivas Plata & Mangold (2010)
- Chapsa inconspicua Lücking, B.Moncada & Álvaro (2023) – Colombia
- Chapsa indica A.Massal. (1860)
- Chapsa inspersa E.L.Lima & Lücking (2019) – Brazil
- Chapsa isidiata Weerakoon, Lücking & Lumbsch (2014)
- Chapsa laemensis (Homchant. & Coppins) Lumbsch & Papong (2010)
- Chapsa leprocarpa (Nyl.) Frisch (2006)
- Chapsa lichexanthonica Aptroot, Lücking & M.Cáceres (2023) – Brazil
- Chapsa meghalayensis (Patw. & Nagarkar) Lumbsch & Divakar (2010)
- Chapsa microspora Kalb (2011)
- Chapsa multicarpa Lücking, Parnmen & Lumbsch (2015)
- Chapsa neei (Hale) Mangold & Lücking (2010)
- Chapsa niveocarpa Mangold (2009)
- Chapsa nubila Sipman (2014)
- Chapsa pallidella Kalb (2009)
- Chapsa paralbida (Riddle) Rivas Plata & Lücking (2010)
- Chapsa patens (Nyl.) Frisch (2006)
- Chapsa perdissuta Sipman & Lücking (2012)
- Chapsa pulchella Wijey., Lücking & Lumbsch (2012)
- Chapsa pulchra (Müll.Arg.) Mangold (2009)
- Chapsa referta (Hale) Lücking (2012)
- Chapsa rubropruinosa Messuti & Codesal (2010)
- Chapsa rubropulveracea Hale ex Mangold, Lücking & Lumbsch (2011)
- Chapsa scabiocarpa Rivas Plata & Lücking (2012) – Peru
- Chapsa scabiomarginata (Hale) Rivas Plata & Lücking (2010)
- Chapsa sorediata Kalb (2009)
- Chapsa sublilacina (Ellis & Everh.) M.Cáceres & Lücking (2007)
- Chapsa subsorediata Rivas Plata & Lücking (2012) – Peru
- Chapsa thallotrema Lücking & N.Salazar (2011)
- Chapsa thambapanni Weerakoon, Jayalal & Lücking (2015) – Sri Lanka
- Chapsa tibellii Mangold (2009)
- Chapsa wijeyaratniana Weerakoon, Lumbsch & Lücking (2012)
