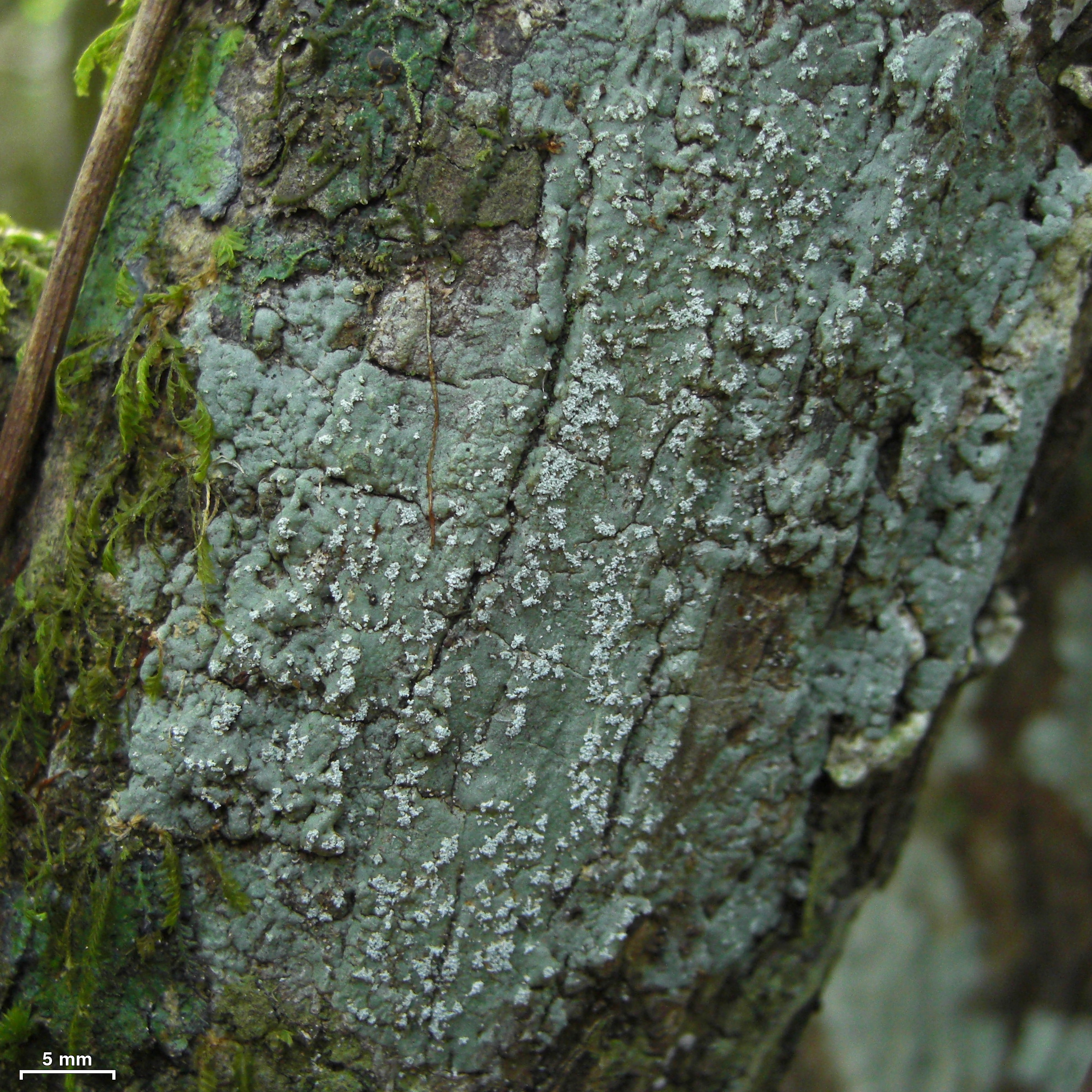
- Myriotrema erodens

Scientific classification
- Domain: Eukaryota
- Kingdom: Fungi
- Division: Ascomycota
- Class: Lecanoromycetes
- Order: Graphidales
- Family: Graphidaceae
- Genus: Myriotrema; Fée (1825)

Type species
- Myriotrema olivaceum Fée (1825)

= Myriotrema =

Genus of lichen-forming fungi

Myriotrema is a genus of lichen-forming fungi in the family Graphidaceae.

== Species ==
- Myriotrema aggregans Sipman & Lücking (2012)
- Myriotrema araracuarense Lücking, B.Moncada & Álvaro (2023) – Colombia
- Myriotrema arimense Lücking (2015)
- Myriotrema barroense (Hale) Hale (1980)
- Myriotrema calvescens (Fée) Hale (1980)
- Myriotrema cinereoglaucescens (Vain.) Hale (1980)
- Myriotrema clandestinoides Sipman & Lücking (2012)
- Myriotrema clandestinum (Fée) Hale (1980)
- Myriotrema classicum Lücking (2012)
- Myriotrema columellatum (Zahlbr.) Sipman (1992)
- Myriotrema compunctum (Ach.) Hale (1980)
- Myriotrema concretum (Fée) Hale (1980)
- Myriotrema congestum (Hale) Hale (1980)
- Myriotrema deceptum (Hale) Hale (1980)
- Myriotrema decorticatum Hale (1981)
- Myriotrema eminens (Hale) Hale (1980)
- Myriotrema endoflavescens Hale ex Lücking (2011)
- Myriotrema exile (Hale) Hale (1980)
- Myriotrema fluorescens Hale (1981)
- Myriotrema foliaceum M.Cáceres, Aptroot & Lücking (2014)
- Myriotrema foliicola (Hale) Hale (1980)
- Myriotrema fragile (Hale) Hale (1980)
- Myriotrema frondosolucens Lücking (2012)
- Myriotrema frondosum Hale (1981)
- Myriotrema frustillatum Mangold (2009)
- Myriotrema glauculum (Nyl.) Hale (1980)
- Myriotrema grandisporum Homchant. & Coppins (2002)
- Myriotrema granulosum (Leight.) Hale (1980)
- Myriotrema hartii (Müll.Arg.) Hale (1980)
- Myriotrema hypoconsticticum van den Boom & Sipman (2017)
- Myriotrema immersum (Eschw.) Hale (1980)
- Myriotrema inspersum M.Cáceres, Aptroot & Lücking (2014)
- Myriotrema leucohymenium (Zahlbr.) Lücking (2016)
- Myriotrema mammillare (Hale) Hale (1980)
- Myriotrema maroense Lücking (2015)
- Myriotrema microphthalmum (Müll.Arg.) Nagarkar & Hale (1989)
- Myriotrema microporum (Mont.) Hale (1980)
- Myriotrema minutulum (Hale) Hale (1980)
- Myriotrema minutum (Hale) Hale (1980)
- Myriotrema multicavum Hale (1981)
- Myriotrema muluense Homchant. & Coppins (2002)
- Myriotrema myrioporoides (Müll.Arg.) Hale (1980)
- Myriotrema myrioporum (Tuck.) Hale (1980)
- Myriotrema myriotremoides (Nyl.) Hale (1980)
- Myriotrema neofrondosum Sipman (1992)
- Myriotrema neoterebrans Frisch (2006)
- Myriotrema norsticticum (Hale) Hale (1980)
- Myriotrema norstictideum (Patw. & Nagarkar) D.D.Awasthi (1991)
- Myriotrema olivaceum Fée (1825)
- Myriotrema plurifarium (Nyl.) Frisch (2006)
- Myriotrema porinaceum (Müll.Arg.) Hale (1980)
- Myriotrema polytretum Hale (1981)
- Myriotrema protocetraricum (Hale) Hale (1980)
- Myriotrema protofrustillatum Sipman (2018)
- Myriotrema pulverulentum (Hale) Hale (1980)
- Myriotrema reclusum (Kremp.) Hale (1980)
- Myriotrema rugiferum (Harm.) Hale (1980)
- Myriotrema scabridum (Hale) Hale (1980)
- Myriotrema secernendum (Harm.) Hale (1980)
- Myriotrema sembilanense Nagarkar & Hale (1989)
- Myriotrema sphinctrinellum (Nyl.) Hale (1980)
- Myriotrema squamiferum Kalb (2020)
- Myriotrema steyermarkii (Hale) Hale (1980)
- Myriotrema subanamaliense Homchant. & Coppins (2002)
- Myriotrema subclandestinum M.Cáceres, Aptroot & Lücking (2014)
- Myriotrema subconforme (Nyl.) Hale (1980)
- Myriotrema subcostaricense Sipman (1994)
- Myriotrema subviride Rivas Plata, Sipman & Lücking (2014)
- Myriotrema temperatum Mangold (2009)
- Myriotrema terebratulum (Nyl.) Hale (1980)
- Myriotrema thailandicum Homchant. & Coppins (2002)
- Myriotrema thwaitesii Hale (1981)
- Myriotrema uniseptatum (Hale) Hale (1980)
- Myriotrema urceolare (Ach.) Hale (1980)
- Myriotrema viride Nagarkar & Hale (1989)
- Myriotrema viridialbum (Kremp.) Hale (1980)
- Myriotrema whalleyanum Homchant. & Coppins (2002)
- Myriotrema zollingeri (Mont. & Bosch) Lücking (2016)
