= Menegazzia bjerkeana =

Scientific classification
- Domain: Eukaryota
- Kingdom: Fungi
- Division: Ascomycota
- Class: Lecanoromycetes
- Order: Lecanorales
- Family: Parmeliaceae
- Genus: Menegazzia
- Species: M. bjerkeana

Binomial name
- Menegazzia bjerkeana Kantvilas (2012)

Species of lichen

Menegazzia bjerkeana is a rare species of foliose lichen in the family Parmeliaceae. It occurs in rainforests along the New South Wales-Queensland border, where it grows on the bark of southern beech trees.

== Taxonomy ==
Menegazzia bjerkeana was described as a new species by Gintaras Kantvilas in 2012. The type specimen was collected along Wiangaree Forest Drive in Tweed Range (New South Wales). Here the lichen was growing on the bark of Nothofagus moorei. The specific epithet honours Norwegian lichenologist Jarle Bjerke.

== Description ==
Menegazzia bjerkeana has a tightly attached thallus that is fragile and brittle. It forms rosettes measuring up to 10 cm (4 in) in diameter, comprising densely overlapping lobes. The pale olive-green to greyish green upper thallus surface is perforated–as is typical of genus Menegazzia. The perforations are abundant, scattered throughout the surface, roundish to oval in shape, and typically measure 0.1–0.5 mm wide. Numerous knob-like isidia cover the thallus surface; they are particularly dense near the centre. Neither apothecia nor pycnidia have been recorded on this species. Secondary chemicals found in the lichen are atranorin, stictic acid, and constictic acid. There are also trace amounts of menegazziaic acid, cryptostictic acid, peristictic acid, and 3-O-methylconsalazinic acid.

== Habitat and distribution ==
Menegazzia bjerkeana is only known to occur at the type locality. This area includes coastal range rainforests along the New South Wales-Queensland border, where Nothofagus predominates. Three other Menegazzia species are confined to this location: M. conica, M. enteroxantha, and M. grandis.

== See also ==
- List of Menegazzia species
