= Menegazzia petraea =

Scientific classification
- Domain: Eukaryota
- Kingdom: Fungi
- Division: Ascomycota
- Class: Lecanoromycetes
- Order: Lecanorales
- Family: Parmeliaceae
- Genus: Menegazzia
- Species: M. petraea

Binomial name
- Menegazzia petraea Kantvilas (2012)

Species of lichen

Menegazzia petraea is a rare species of foliose lichen in the family Parmeliaceae. Found in Australia, the species was described as new to science by Australian lichenologist Gintaras Kantvilas in 2012. The type specimen was collected at the summit of Gog Range, Tasmania at an altitude of 720 m (2,360 ft). Here it was found growing on conglomerate boulders in scrubby heath. The specific epithet petraea not only refers to its saxicolous habitat (the Ancient Greek petraeus means "living in rocky places"), but also indirectly hints at the first name of English botanist and lichenologist Peter Wilfred James, who, according to Kantvilas, "has made significant contributions to the study of Menegazzia and first noted the unusual chemical composition of this species".

Menegazzia petraea contains the secondary compounds atranorin, fumarprotocetraric acid, and traces of protocetraric acid and succinprotocetraric acid. Menegazzia aeneofusca is morphologically indistinguishable from this species; it can be distinguished by the presence of stictic acid rather than fumarprotocetraric acid. The two lichens often grow together. Menegazzia petraea is only known to occur at high elevations in Tasmania.

== See also ==
- List of Menegazzia species
