= Menegazzia confusa =

Scientific classification
- Domain: Eukaryota
- Kingdom: Fungi
- Division: Ascomycota
- Class: Lecanoromycetes
- Order: Lecanorales
- Family: Parmeliaceae
- Genus: Menegazzia
- Species: M. confusa

Binomial name
- Menegazzia confusa P.James (1987)

Species of lichen

Menegazzia confusa is a species of foliose lichen found in Australia. It was formally described as a new species in 1987 by lichenologist Peter James. The type specimen was collected by Gintaras Kantvilas near Lake Leake Road in Tasmania, where it was found growing on the bark of Exocarpos cupressiformis in a sclerophyll forest. It also occurs in Victoria. The lichen is quite similar to Menegazzia platytrema, but typically has more crowded apothecia, and lobes that are shorter and more congested. Menegazzia confusa contains caperatic acid as its primary lichen product, whereas M. platytrema contains stictic acid and related compounds.

The total content of carotenoids in Menegazzia confusa was measured in one study as 15.28 micrograms per gram (dry weight).

== See also ==
- List of Menegazzia species
