= Menegazzia williamsii =

Scientific classification
- Domain: Eukaryota
- Kingdom: Fungi
- Division: Ascomycota
- Class: Lecanoromycetes
- Order: Lecanorales
- Family: Parmeliaceae
- Genus: Menegazzia
- Species: M. williamsii

Binomial name
- Menegazzia williamsii Kantvilas (2019)

Species of lichen

Menegazzia williamsii is a species of foliose lichen in the family Parmeliaceae. Found in New South Wales, Australia, it was described as a new species in 2019 by lichenologist Gintaras Kantvilas.

== Taxonomy ==
The type specimen was collected from Point Lookout (New England), at an altitude of 1,500 m (4,900 ft). Here it was found growing in scrub on twigs of Banksia integrifolia subsp. compar. The lichen is only known to occur in this area, where it grows as an epiphyte on twigs, branches, and trunks in wet scrub and forest dominated by sclerophyll. It also occurs in rainforest dominated by Antarctic beech (Nothofagus moorei). The specific epithet honours Australian botanist John Beaumont Williams, "who co-collected some of the material on which the description is based and had an intimate knowledge of the botany of the New England region of northern New South Wales".

== Description ==
The main characteristics of Menegazzia williamsii are an inflated and fragile thallus lacking soredia; the presence of the secondary chemical stictic acid and the lack of isopigmentosin; asci with two spores; and a scattered (inspersed) epihymenium. Other Menegazzia species with which it shares some characteristics include M. elongata, M. platytrema, and M. pertransita.

== See also ==
- List of Menegazzia species
