= Menegazzia endocrocea =

Scientific classification
- Kingdom: Fungi
- Division: Ascomycota
- Class: Lecanoromycetes
- Order: Lecanorales
- Family: Parmeliaceae
- Genus: Menegazzia
- Species: M. endocrocea

Binomial name
- Menegazzia endocrocea Kantvilas (2011)
- Holotype site: Mount Cameron, Tasmania

Species of lichen

Menegazzia endocrocea is a species of foliose lichen in the family Parmeliaceae. It is found in Australia. The lichen forms irregular rosettes up to 10 cm wide with hollow, cylindrical lobes that branch dichotomously, featuring a pale grey to cream-grey upper surface with roundish holes and a wrinkled, black lower surface. It has scattered apothecia (fruiting bodies) with a reddish-brown disc, two-spored asci, and abundant pycnidia, identified chemically by compounds like atranorin and stictic acid.

== Taxonomy ==
The lichen was described as new to science in 2011 by the Australian lichenologist Gintaras Kantvilas. The type specimen was collected from Mount Cameron in Tasmania, at an elevation of 550 m (1,800 ft). The specimen was gathered from granite outcrops within heathland in July 1995 by Kantvilas and Peter Crittenden, and it is preserved as the holotype in the herbarium of the University of Tasmania with an isotype at the British Museum. The species epithet endocrocea alludes to the distinctive orange colouration found in the medullary cavity of the younger lobes.

== Description ==
Menegazzia endocrocea typically forms irregularly shaped rosettes up to 100 mm wide or smaller, scattered clumps of lobes. These lobes are hollow, cylindrical, and range from 1 to 4 mm in width, branching dichotomously and slightly constricted at the junctions. The central lobes are densely overlapping and generally free of secondary lobules, while the marginal lobes radiate outward, lying almost flat. The upper surface of the thallus is pale grey to cream-grey, sometimes discoloured black in older areas, and is perforated with many roundish holes ranging from 0.5 to 1.7 mm in width. The lower surface is wrinkled and black, turning brownish towards the tips of the lobes. The medullary cavity is black with a cobweb of whitish hyphae in older lobes and pale orange in younger ones.

Apothecia are scattered, measuring 1–4 mm wide, with a thalline margin that is initially thick and later becomes narrow. The reddish-brown disc of the apothecia is often undulate and eroded. The hymenium is colourless in the lower part and topped with a reddish-brown epithecial layer. Asci are two-spored and broad, often deeply nested within a network of paraphyses with brown capitate tips. Ascospores are hyaline, sometimes brownish when over-mature, and broadly ellipsoidal. Pycnidia are abundant, appearing as black specks on the upper surface, with fusiform conidia.

This species is identified by its chemical composition, including small amounts of atranorin and chloroatranorin, stictic acid, constictic acid, cryptostictic acid, peristictic acid, and the pigment isopigmentosin A. Its cortex reacts K+ (yellow), and its medulla reacts P+ (orange), and shows orange fluorescence under ultraviolet light. According to Kantvilas' classification of medullary chemosyndromes (i.e., sets of lichen products produced by a species found in Tasmanian Menegazzia, it fits in the stictic acid "1d" chemosyndrome, which includes M. elongata and M. subbullata.

== Habitat and distribution ==
Menegazzia endocrocea is found only along the eastern coast of Tasmania and the Bass Strait islands. This lichen prefers the sheltered, fire-protected crevices of Devonian granite located in heathy summits near the sea. It tends to occur in small, fragmented colonies, indicating a possible decline and a relict distribution. The species is vulnerable to fires, which are a significant threat in the heathy, sclerophyllous vegetation of its habitat. The granite areas along Tasmania's eastern coast are known for supporting a diverse range of flora, including numerous unique and endemic species of both lichens and vascular plants.

== See also ==
- List of Menegazzia species
