= Menegazzia tarkinea =

Scientific classification
- Domain: Eukaryota
- Kingdom: Fungi
- Division: Ascomycota
- Class: Lecanoromycetes
- Order: Lecanorales
- Family: Parmeliaceae
- Genus: Menegazzia
- Species: M. tarkinea

Binomial name
- Menegazzia tarkinea Kantvilas (2012)

Species of lichen

Menegazzia tarkinea is a rare species of foliose lichen in the family Parmeliaceae. It occurs in North West Tasmania (Australia).

== Taxonomy ==
The species was described as new to science by lichenologist Gintaras Kantvilas in 2012. The type specimen was collected along the Savage River Pipeline Road, where it was found at the edge of a rainforest growing on Nothofagus cunninghamii. The specific epithet refers to the Tarkine, an area containing the biodiverse Savage River National Park in northwest Tasmania.

== Description ==
The lichen has a foliose, pale grey-white thallus that is tightly attached to its twig substrate, extending to about 6 cm (2.4 in) in diameter. The thallus surface lacks isidia and soredia, and has only a few roundish perforations, which are about 0.2–0.5 mm wide. Apothecia are scattered on the surface; they are flat, measuring about 6 mm (0.24 in) in diameter, and have an orange-brown to brown disc. Ascospores are ovoid to ellipsoid with dimensions of 40–52 by 28–34 μm.

The secondary chemicals found in Menegazzia tarkinea are atranorin, lecanoric acid, norstictic acid, and connorstictic acid. The expected results of standard chemical spot tests on the medulla are K+ (yellow/red), P+ (orange), C−, and KC−.

Menegazzia tarkinea is a very rare Tasmanian endemic species. It is only known to occur at the type locality. A lookalike species is M. ramulicola, which has a similar compact growth form and similar substrate preference, but does not share the same unique chemistry as Menegazzia tarkinea.

== See also ==
- List of Menegazzia species
