= Menegazzia kantvillasii =

Scientific classification
- Domain: Eukaryota
- Kingdom: Fungi
- Division: Ascomycota
- Class: Lecanoromycetes
- Order: Lecanorales
- Family: Parmeliaceae
- Genus: Menegazzia
- Species: M. kantvillasii

Binomial name
- Menegazzia kantvillasii P.James (1992)

Species of lichen

Menegazzia kantvillasii is a species of foliose lichen found in Australia and South America. It was described as new to science in 1992. The specific epithet honours Australian lichenologist Gintaras Kantvilas.

== See also ==
- List of Menegazzia species
