= Menegazzia gallowayi =

Scientific classification
- Domain: Eukaryota
- Kingdom: Fungi
- Division: Ascomycota
- Class: Lecanoromycetes
- Order: Lecanorales
- Family: Parmeliaceae
- Genus: Menegazzia
- Species: M. gallowayi

Binomial name
- Menegazzia gallowayi Kantvilas (2012)

Species of lichen

Menegazzia gallowayi is a species of lichen in the family Parmeliaceae. Found in New Zealand, it was formally described as a new species in 2012 by Australian lichenologist Gintaras Kantvilas. The type specimen was collected near the Craigieburn stream (Craigieburn Range, South Island) at an altitude of 1,050 m (3,440 ft). Here it was found growing on a young mountain beech (Nothofagus solandri var. cliffortioides). The specific epithet honours New Zealand lichenologist David John Galloway. According to Kantvilas, his work Flora of New Zealand Lichens has "greatly advanced knowledge of the lichens of the Southern Hemisphere".

The lichen is only known from the type locality, where it grows in low, closed forest. The main characteristics that distinguish it from other members of Menegazzia are the eight-spored asci and the presence of fumarprotocetraric acid, a secondary chemical that is uncommon in the genus.

== See also ==
- List of Menegazzia species
