= Menegazzia subpertusa =

Scientific classification
- Domain: Eukaryota
- Kingdom: Fungi
- Division: Ascomycota
- Class: Lecanoromycetes
- Order: Lecanorales
- Family: Parmeliaceae
- Genus: Menegazzia
- Species: M. subpertusa

Binomial name
- Menegazzia subpertusa P.James & D.J.Galloway (1983)

Species of lichen

Menegazzia subpertusa is a species of foliose lichen found in New Zealand, Australia, and South America.

== Description ==
Menegazzia subpertusa forms small, leafy rosettes that are usually round but can become irregular, measuring up to about 10 cm across. The individual lobes are narrow—typically 1–2.5 mm wide—and their upper surface ranges from slightly wrinkled to rather rough. Minute, powder-like reproductive granules called soredia develop across the lobe surface; they are not confined to the species' characteristic perforations but instead appear in separate, shallow patches.

Sexual fruit-bodies (apothecia) are uncommon. When present they are mostly 2–4 mm wide (occasionally to 6 mm) and lack the grainy outer film seen in some related species. Each cylindrical ascus contains only two large, colourless ascospores, roughly 48–60 μm long and 25–30 μm wide. Chemical tests show a complex mixture of lichen products—chiefly stictic, constictic, norstictic and menegazziaic acids—along with several minor compounds.

== See also ==
- List of Menegazzia species
