= Menegazzia subtestacea =

Scientific classification
- Domain: Eukaryota
- Kingdom: Fungi
- Division: Ascomycota
- Class: Lecanoromycetes
- Order: Lecanorales
- Family: Parmeliaceae
- Genus: Menegazzia
- Species: M. subtestacea

Binomial name
- Menegazzia subtestacea Kantvilas (2012)

Species of lichen

Menegazzia subtestacea is a species of foliose lichen in the family Parmeliaceae. It is found in Tasmania (Australia), where it grows at high elevations on the twigs and young branches of alpine shrubs.

== Taxonomy ==
The species was described as new to science by Australian lichenologist Gintaras Kantvilas in 2012. The type specimen was collected from Crater Peak (Tasmania) at an altitude of 1,200 m (3,900 ft), where it was found growing on the bark of a narrow leaf orites plant (Orites revolutus) in alpine heath. The specific epithet refers to its similarity to and former confusion with Menegazzia testacea.

== Description ==
The lobes comprising the chestnut-brown thallus are mostly 1.5–3.5 mm (0.06–0.14 in) wide, and most are inflated, with a somewhat "puffy" appearance. The conical to hemispherical apothecia have a swollen base (pedicel). It usually tightly encircles twigs and young branches of alpine shrubs such as Orites, Nothofagus, Epacris, Tasmannia and Richea. Menegazzia subtestacea contains the compounds atranorin and stictic acid as the major secondary chemicals, as well as trace amounts of a suite of stictic-acid related chemicals. The expected results of standard chemical spot tests on the medulla are K+ (yellow), P+ (orange), C−, and KC−.

The name Menegazzia testacea refers to New Zealand populations; in addition to its distribution, this species differs from M. subtestacea in that it contains hypostictic, hyposalazinic and hypoconstictic acids.

Menegazzia subtestacea is mostly corticolous, although rarely, the lichen has been recorded forming rosettes on rock. It is widespread in Tasmania, occurring at high elevations.

== See also ==
- List of Menegazzia species
