= Menegazzia minuta =

Scientific classification
- Domain: Eukaryota
- Kingdom: Fungi
- Division: Ascomycota
- Class: Lecanoromycetes
- Order: Lecanorales
- Family: Parmeliaceae
- Genus: Menegazzia
- Species: M. minuta

Binomial name
- Menegazzia minuta P.James & Kantvilas (1987)

Species of lichen

Menegazzia minuta is a rare species of foliose lichen that is endemic to Tasmania, Australia. It was scientifically described as a new species in 1987 by lichenologists Peter James and Gintaras Kantvilas. The type specimen was collected by the second author south of Arthur River, where the lichen was found in a rainforest growing on twigs of leatherwood (Eucryphia lucida). The species epithet minuta refers to the small size of its thallus. Menegazzia minuta contains protolichesterinic acid, a lichen product that helps to distinguish it from the similar species Menegazzia eperforata, which instead contains stictic acid and related compounds. In a 2012 publication, Kantvilas called M. minuta "one of Tasmania's rarest lichens", characterised by a "glossy olive-brown thallus of minute, spidery lobes, densely beset with lobule-like isidia".

== See also ==
- List of Menegazzia species
