= Menegazzia wilsonii =

Scientific classification
- Domain: Eukaryota
- Kingdom: Fungi
- Division: Ascomycota
- Class: Lecanoromycetes
- Order: Lecanorales
- Family: Parmeliaceae
- Genus: Menegazzia
- Species: M. wilsonii

Binomial name
- Menegazzia wilsonii (Räsänen) Bjerke (2005)

Synonyms
- Anzia wilsonii Räsänen (1944); Pannoparmelia wilsonii (Räsänen) D.J.Galloway (1978)

Species of lichen

Menegazzia wilsonii is a species of lichen found in South America. It was first described to science as Anzia wilsonii by Veli Johannes Paavo Bartholomeus Räsänen in 1944, transferred to the genus Pannoparmelia in 1978, and finally transferred to Menegazzia in 2005.

== See also ==
- List of Menegazzia species
