= Menegazzia ultralucens =

Scientific classification
- Domain: Eukaryota
- Kingdom: Fungi
- Division: Ascomycota
- Class: Lecanoromycetes
- Order: Lecanorales
- Family: Parmeliaceae
- Genus: Menegazzia
- Species: M. ultralucens

Binomial name
- Menegazzia ultralucens P.James & D.J.Galloway (1983)

Species of fungus

Menegazzia ultralucens is a species of lichen found in New Zealand and Australia.

== See also ==
- List of Menegazzia species
