= Menegazzia lucens =

Scientific classification
- Domain: Eukaryota
- Kingdom: Fungi
- Division: Ascomycota
- Class: Lecanoromycetes
- Order: Lecanorales
- Family: Parmeliaceae
- Genus: Menegazzia
- Species: M. lucens

Binomial name
- Menegazzia lucens P.James & D.J.Galloway (1983)

Species of lichen

Menegazzia lucens is a species of foliose lichen from New Zealand.

== See also ==
- List of Menegazzia species
