= Menegazzia aucklandica =

Scientific classification
- Domain: Eukaryota
- Kingdom: Fungi
- Division: Ascomycota
- Class: Lecanoromycetes
- Order: Lecanorales
- Family: Parmeliaceae
- Genus: Menegazzia
- Species: M. aucklandica

Binomial name
- Menegazzia aucklandica P.James & D.J.Galloway (1983)

Species of lichen

Menegazzia aucklandica is a species of foliose lichen from New Zealand. It was described as new to science by David Galloway and Peter James in 1983.

== See also ==
- List of Menegazzia species
