= Menegazzia brattii =

Scientific classification
- Domain: Eukaryota
- Kingdom: Fungi
- Division: Ascomycota
- Class: Lecanoromycetes
- Order: Lecanorales
- Family: Parmeliaceae
- Genus: Menegazzia
- Species: M. brattii

Binomial name
- Menegazzia brattii Kantvilas (2012)

Species of lichen

Menegazzia brattii is a rare species of foliose lichen in the family Parmeliaceae. It was described as a new species by Gintaras Kantvilas in 2012. The type specimen was collected from the Bras de la Fonderie in the Kerguelen Islands. Here it was found at the summit of coastal cliffs west of Col Demi-Lune. The lichen was growing on the bark of an unidentified tree or shrub. The specific epithet brattii honours Tasmanian lichenologist Geoffrey Charles Bratt, who collected the type specimen in 1971 when he was on a botanical expedition in Kerguelen with Henry Imshaug.

Characteristics of Menegazzia brattii include its eight-spored asci, the presence of orange and yellow pigments, and the presence of the compound lecanoric acid.

Menegazzia castanea is the only other Menegazzia species known to occur on the Kergulen Islands.

== See also ==
- List of Menegazzia species
