= Menegazzia corrugata =

Scientific classification
- Domain: Eukaryota
- Kingdom: Fungi
- Division: Ascomycota
- Class: Lecanoromycetes
- Order: Lecanorales
- Family: Parmeliaceae
- Genus: Menegazzia
- Species: M. corrugata

Binomial name
- Menegazzia corrugata P.James (1992)

Species of fungus

Menegazzia corrugata is a species of foliose lichen from Australia. It was described as new to science in 1992.

== See also ==
- List of Menegazzia species
