= Menegazzia sanguinascens =

Scientific classification
- Domain: Eukaryota
- Kingdom: Fungi
- Division: Ascomycota
- Class: Lecanoromycetes
- Order: Lecanorales
- Family: Parmeliaceae
- Genus: Menegazzia
- Species: M. sanguinascens

Binomial name
- Menegazzia sanguinascens (Räsänen) R.Sant. (1942)

Synonyms
- Parmelia sanguinascens Räsänen (1932)

Species of lichen

Menegazzia sanguinascens is a species of foliose lichen found in southern South America. It was first formally described as a new species in 1932 by Finnish lichenologist Veli Räsänen, who included it in genus Parmelia. The type specimen was collected from Agostini Fjord (Chiloé Island, Chile). Rolf Santesson transferred the taxon to Menegazzia in 1942. The species contains atranorin, hypothamnolic acid, and thamnolic acid as lichen products.

== See also ==
- List of Menegazzia species
