= Menegazzia caviisidia =

Scientific classification
- Domain: Eukaryota
- Kingdom: Fungi
- Division: Ascomycota
- Class: Lecanoromycetes
- Order: Lecanorales
- Family: Parmeliaceae
- Genus: Menegazzia
- Species: M. caviisidia

Binomial name
- Menegazzia caviisidia Bjerke & P.James (2004)

Species of lichen

Menegazzia caviisidia (ツブクダチイ) is a rare species of foliose lichen found in Japan. It was formally described as a new species in 2004 by Jarle Bjerke and Peter James. Characteristics of the lichen include its numerous spherical to finger-like (dactyliform) to narrowly obovate, hollow isidia, and small conical perforations in the thallus. It contains thamnolic acid as the major lichen product in the medulla.

== See also ==
- List of Menegazzia species
