= Menegazzia hollermayeri =

Scientific classification
- Domain: Eukaryota
- Kingdom: Fungi
- Division: Ascomycota
- Class: Lecanoromycetes
- Order: Lecanorales
- Family: Parmeliaceae
- Genus: Menegazzia
- Species: M. hollermayeri

Binomial name
- Menegazzia hollermayeri (Räsänen) R.Sant. (1942)

Synonyms
- Parmelia hollermayeri Räsänen (1937)

Species of lichen

Menegazzia hollermayeri is a species of foliose lichen found in southern South America. It was first formally described as a new species in 1937 by Finnish lichenologist Veli Räsänen, who included it in genus Parmelia. The type specimen was collected from Chile by R. P. Atanasio Hollermayer, after whom the lichen is named. Rolf Santesson transferred the taxon to Menegazzia in 1942.

== See also ==
- List of Menegazzia species
