= Menegazzia inflata =

Scientific classification
- Domain: Eukaryota
- Kingdom: Fungi
- Division: Ascomycota
- Class: Lecanoromycetes
- Order: Lecanorales
- Family: Parmeliaceae
- Genus: Menegazzia
- Species: M. inflata

Binomial name
- Menegazzia inflata (Hillmann) P.James & D.J.Galloway (1983)

Synonyms
- Parmelia inflata Hillmann (1940)

Species of lichen

Menegazzia inflata is a species of foliose lichen found in New Zealand. Originally described as a species of Parmelia in 1940, it was transferred to the genus Menegazzia in 1983.

== See also ==
- List of Menegazzia species
