= Menegazzia hypogymnioides =

Scientific classification
- Domain: Eukaryota
- Kingdom: Fungi
- Division: Ascomycota
- Class: Lecanoromycetes
- Order: Lecanorales
- Family: Parmeliaceae
- Genus: Menegazzia
- Species: M. hypogymnioides

Binomial name
- Menegazzia hypogymnioides Kantvilas (2012)

Species of lichen

Menegazzia hypogymnioides is a species of foliose lichen in the family Parmeliaceae. Found in Australia, the species was described as new to science by Australian lichenologist Gintaras Kantvilas in 2012. The type specimen was collected from Clear Hill, Tasmania, at an altitude of 1,190 m (3,900 ft), where it was growing on conglomerate boulders in alpine heath. The specific epithet refers to its similarity to a small species of Hypogymnia. It is a very rare species that occurs only at high elevations in southwestern Tasmania, typically in sheltered habitats.

== See also ==
- List of Menegazzia species
