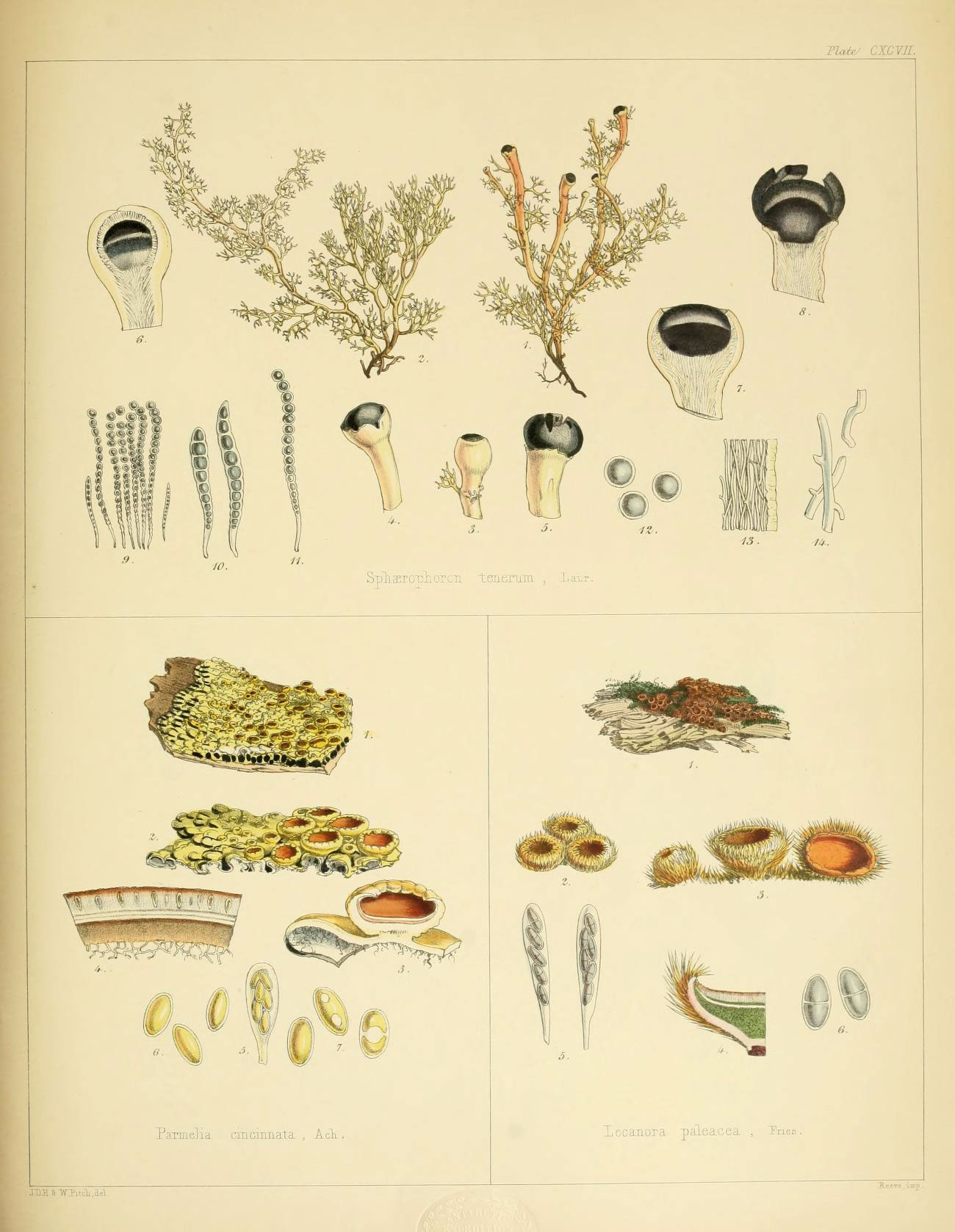
- Illustration of Parmelia cincinnata now known as M. cincinnata.

Scientific classification
- Kingdom: Fungi
- Division: Ascomycota
- Class: Lecanoromycetes
- Order: Lecanorales
- Family: Parmeliaceae
- Genus: Menegazzia
- Species: M. cincinnata

Binomial name
- Menegazzia cincinnata (Ach.) Bitter (1901)

Synonyms
- Parmelia cincinnata Ach. (1803)

= Menegazzia cincinnata =

Species of lichen

Menegazzia cincinnata is a species of foliose lichen from southern South America. It was first scientifically described by Swedish lichenologist Erik Acharius as Parmelia cincinnata. Friedrich August Georg Bitter transferred it to the genus Menegazzia in 1901.

Menegazzia cincinnata is quite similar in morphology to Menegazzia valdiviensis, but the two species can be distinguished from each other by a combination of ascospore length and the presence or absence of thamnolic acid in the medulla.

== See also ==
- List of Menegazzia species
