= Menegazzia megalospora =

Scientific classification
- Domain: Eukaryota
- Kingdom: Fungi
- Division: Ascomycota
- Class: Lecanoromycetes
- Order: Lecanorales
- Family: Parmeliaceae
- Genus: Menegazzia
- Species: M. megalospora

Binomial name
- Menegazzia megalospora (Räsänen) R.Sant. (1942)

Synonyms
- Parmelia megalospora Räsänen (1932)

Species of lichen

Menegazzia megalospora is a species of foliose lichen from South America. It was formally described as a new species in 1942 by Finnish lichenologist Veli Räsänen, as a member of Parmelia. Rolf Santesson transferred it to the genus Menegazzia in 1942.

== See also ==
- List of Menegazzia species
