= Menegazzia neozelandica =

Scientific classification
- Domain: Eukaryota
- Kingdom: Fungi
- Division: Ascomycota
- Class: Lecanoromycetes
- Order: Lecanorales
- Family: Parmeliaceae
- Genus: Menegazzia
- Species: M. neozelandica

Binomial name
- Menegazzia neozelandica (Zahlbr.) P.James (1992)

Synonyms
- Parmelia neozelandica Zahlbr. (1929)

Species of lichen

Menegazzia neozelandica is a species of foliose lichen from New Zealand, Australia, and South America. It was first described by Austrian botanist Alexander Zahlbruckner in 1929 as Parmelia neozelandica. Peter James transferred it to the genus Menegazzia in 1992.

== See also ==
- List of Menegazzia species
