= Menegazzia fortuita =

Scientific classification
- Kingdom: Fungi
- Division: Ascomycota
- Class: Lecanoromycetes
- Order: Lecanorales
- Family: Parmeliaceae
- Genus: Menegazzia
- Species: M. fortuita

Binomial name
- Menegazzia fortuita Elix & P.M.McCarthy (2017)

Species of lichen

Menegazzia fortuita is a species of foliose lichen in the family Parmeliaceae. Found in Australia, it was described as a new species in 2017 by lichenologists John Elix and Patrick McCarthy, it is known only from a few locations in Morton National Park in New South Wales, where it grows on sandstone in open Eucalyptus woodland. The species epithet fortuita refers to its fortuitous discovery during an unplanned field stop that helped resolve the identity of several previously unidentified specimens. The lichen contains stictic acid as its major secondary metabolite, along with minor amounts of atranorin and constictic acid.

== Taxonomy ==
Menegazzia fortuita was formally described in 2017 by John Elix and Patrick McCarthy after they discovered several unnamed herbarium specimens matched material collected during an unplanned stop in Morton National Park, New South Wales – hence the epithet fortuita ('by chance'). The species belongs to the foliose-lichen genus Menegazzia within the family Parmeliaceae.

Within the genus, M. fortuita is set apart by a suite of characters: very fragile, narrowly linear lobes, the absence of any vegetative propagules, asci that contain only two spores rather than eight, and exceptionally large ascospores (62–98 × 37–65 μm) with thick walls (up to 13 μm). Chemically it carries the stictic acid suite in the medulla, whereas superficially similar saxicolous congeners show different chemistry or much smaller spores – for example M. aeneofusca has spores around half the size, and the widespread M. platytrema has broader, paler lobes and thinner-walled spores.

== Description ==
The lichen forms an irregular rosette or spreading patch up to about 3 cm across. It is foliose, meaning the thallus resembles tiny, leafy lobes rather than a crust. Those lobes are hollow, extremely fragile and measure 0.5–1.5 mm wide, branching in a rather untidy, forked fashion. Their upper surface ranges from off-white through grey-brown to almost black, often becoming glossy with age, and lacks any powdery soredia or finger-like isidia. Scattered oval to round perforations (0.1–0.6 mm) pierce the surface; their rims show flecks of the white inner tissue (medulla). Because the species is saxicolous (rock-dwelling), the entire thallus lies close against or slightly lifted from its substrate.

Rounded fruit-bodies (apothecia) are frequent. They sit flush with, or a little above, the lobe surface and mature into discs up to about 0.7 mm across, with a dull brown-black interior ringed by a similar-coloured margin. Microscopic examination shows clavate asci that hold just two colourless, ellipsoid spores – each longer than 60 micrometres (μm) and often packed with tiny oil droplets. Chemical spot tests yield cortex K+ (yellow) and medulla K+ (yellow), confirming atranorin in the outer layer and a stictic acid complex in the medulla; reactions with C and KC are negative. Immersed flask-shaped pycnidia produce slender, rod-shaped conidia (4.5–7.5 × 0.7–1 μm) that provide a second means of asexual dispersal.

== Habitat and distribution ==
Menegazzia fortuita is known to occur only in four sandstone outcrops in Morton National Park, south-eastern New South Wales. It grows on Hawkesbury sandstone blocks and ledges within open Eucalyptus woodland, conditions that provide intermittent shade, regular moisture from run-off, and a generally nutrient-poor, siliceous substrate. Associated lichens include rock-dwelling species of Buellia, Lecanora, Pertusaria, Ramboldia and Xanthoparmelia, indicating a community adapted to the exposed but not fully coastal sandstone environments of the Southern Tablelands. All collections lie within a relatively small area of the park, suggesting the species may be a local endemic.
