= Menegazzia jamesii =

Scientific classification
- Domain: Eukaryota
- Kingdom: Fungi
- Division: Ascomycota
- Class: Lecanoromycetes
- Order: Lecanorales
- Family: Parmeliaceae
- Genus: Menegazzia
- Species: M. jamesii

Binomial name
- Menegazzia jamesii Louwhoff & Kantvilas (2004)

Species of lichen

Menegazzia jamesii is a species of lichen found in Australia.

== See also ==
- List of Menegazzia species
