= Menegazzia fertilis =

Scientific classification
- Kingdom: Fungi
- Division: Ascomycota
- Class: Lecanoromycetes
- Order: Lecanorales
- Family: Parmeliaceae
- Genus: Menegazzia
- Species: M. fertilis

Binomial name
- Menegazzia fertilis P.James (1992)

Species of fungus

Menegazzia fertilis is a species of foliose lichen in the family Parmeliaceae. Found in Australia, it was described as new to science in 1992.

== See also ==
- List of Menegazzia species
