= Menegazzia stirtonii =

Scientific classification
- Kingdom: Fungi
- Division: Ascomycota
- Class: Lecanoromycetes
- Order: Lecanorales
- Family: Parmeliaceae
- Genus: Menegazzia
- Species: M. stirtonii

Binomial name
- Menegazzia stirtonii (Zahlbr.) Kantvilas & Louwhoff (2004)

Species of lichen

Menegazzia stirtonii is a species of foliose lichen found in New Zealand, and Tasmania, Australia.

It was first described as Parmelia stirtonii in 1929 by Alexander Zahlbruckner. In 2004 Gintaras Kantvilas and Simone Louwhoff transferred it to the genus Menegazzia.

== See also ==
- List of Menegazzia species
