= Menegazzia caesiopruinosa =

Scientific classification
- Domain: Eukaryota
- Kingdom: Fungi
- Division: Ascomycota
- Class: Lecanoromycetes
- Order: Lecanorales
- Family: Parmeliaceae
- Genus: Menegazzia
- Species: M. caesiopruinosa

Binomial name
- Menegazzia caesiopruinosa P.James (1987)

Species of fungus

Menegazzia caesiopruinosa is a species of lichen from Australia. It was described as new to science in 1987.

== See also ==
- List of Menegazzia species
