= Menegazzia dissoluta =

Scientific classification
- Kingdom: Fungi
- Division: Ascomycota
- Class: Lecanoromycetes
- Order: Lecanorales
- Family: Parmeliaceae
- Genus: Menegazzia
- Species: M. dissoluta

Binomial name
- Menegazzia dissoluta P.James, Aptroot, Sérus. & Diederich (2001)

Species of lichen

Menegazzia dissoluta is a species of corticolous (bark-dwelling), foliose lichen found in Papua New Guinea. It was formally described as a new species in 2001 by lichenologists Peter Wilfred James, André Aptroot, Emmanuël Sérusiaux, and Paul Diederich. The type specimen was collected by Harrie Sipman in Mount Gahavisuka Provincial Park (Goroka) at an altitude of 2,300 m (7,500 ft); there it was found growing as an epiphyte on a fallen Castanopsis tree in a mossy, mountainous forest. The species epithet dissoluta refers to the "irregularly finely wrinkled upper surface that dissolves into soredia".

== See also ==
- List of Menegazzia species
