= Menegazzia efflorescens =

Scientific classification
- Kingdom: Fungi
- Division: Ascomycota
- Class: Lecanoromycetes
- Order: Lecanorales
- Family: Parmeliaceae
- Genus: Menegazzia
- Species: M. efflorescens

Binomial name
- Menegazzia efflorescens P.James, Aptroot, Sérus. & Diederich (2001)

Species of lichen

Menegazzia efflorescens is a species of foliose lichen in the family Parmeliaceae. Described as new to science in 2001, it is found in Papua New Guinea.

== See also ==
- List of Menegazzia species
