= List of Menegazzia species =

This is a list of species in the lichenised ascomycete genus Menegazzia. As of November 2025, Species Fungorum accepts 83 species of Menegazzia.

- Menegazzia abscondita G.Kantvilas (2012)
- Menegazzia aeneofusca (Müll.Arg.) R.Sant. (1942)
- Menegazzia albida (Zahlbr.) R.Sant. (1942)
- Menegazzia anteforata Aptroot, M.-J.Lai, & Sparrius (2003)
- Menegazzia asahinae (Yasuda ex Asahina) R.Sant. (1942)
- Menegazzia asekiensis Elix (2007)
- Menegazzia athrotaxidis G.Kantvilas (2012)
- Menegazzia aucklandica (Zahlbr.) P.James & D.J.Galloway (1983)
- Menegazzia bjerkeana Kantvilas (2012)
- Menegazzia brattii Kantvilas (2012)
- Menegazzia caesiopruinosa P.James (1987)
- Menegazzia caliginosa P.James & D.J.Galloway (1983)
- Menegazzia capitata Sipman & Bjerke (2007)
- Menegazzia castanea P.James & D.J.Galloway (1983)
- Menegazzia caviisidia Bjerke & P.James (2004)
- Menegazzia chrysogaster Bjerke & Elvebakk (2001)
- Menegazzia cincinnata (Kremp.) Bitter (1901)
- Menegazzia confusa P.James (1987)
- Menegazzia conica P.James (1992)
- Menegazzia corrugata P.James (1992)
- Menegazzia dielsii (Hillmann) R.Sant. (1942)
- Menegazzia digitiformis P.James, Aptroot, Sérus. & Diederich (2001)
- Menegazzia dispora (Nyl.) R.Sant. (1942)
- Menegazzia dissoluta P.James, Aptroot, Sérus. & Diederich (2001)
- Menegazzia efflorescens P.James, Aptroot, Sérus. & Diederich (2001)
- Menegazzia elongata P.James (1992)
- Menegazzia endocrocea Kantvilas (2011)
- Menegazzia enteroxantha (Müll.Arg.) R.Sant. (1942)
- Menegazzia eperforata P.James & D.J.Galloway (1983)
- Menegazzia faminensis Elix (2007)
- Menegazzia fertilis P.James (1992)
- Menegazzia fissicarpa P.James (1992)
- Menegazzia foraminulosa (Kremp.) Bitter (1901)
- Menegazzia fortuita Elix & P.M.McCarthy (2017)
- Menegazzia fumarprotocetrarica Calvelo & Adler (1996)
- Menegazzia gallowayi Kantvilas (2012)
- Menegazzia globoisidiata Elix (2007)
- Menegazzia globulifera R. Sant. (1942)
- Menegazzia grandis P.James (1992)
- Menegazzia hollermayeri (Räsänen) R.Sant. (1942)
- Menegazzia hypernota Bjerke (2004)
- Menegazzia hypogymnioides G.Kantvilas (2012)
- Menegazzia inactiva P.James & Kantvilas (1987)
- Menegazzia inflata (Hillmann) P.James & D.J.Galloway (1983)
- Menegazzia isidiata P.James, Aptroot, Sérus. & Diederich (2001)
- Menegazzia jamesii Louwhoff & Kantvilas (2004)
- Menegazzia kantvillasii P.James (1992)
- Menegazzia kawesqarica Bjerke & Elvebakk (2001)
- Menegazzia lordhowensis Elix (2007)
- Menegazzia lucens P.James & D.J.Galloway (1983)
- Menegazzia magellanica R.Sant (1942)
- Menegazzia malesiana Elix, Bawingan & Schumm (2005)
- Menegazzia megalospora (Räsänen) R.Sant. (1942)
- Menegazzia megathallina P.James, Aptroot, Sérus. & Diederich (2001)
- Menegazzia menyamyaensis Elix (2008)
- Menegazzia minuta P.James & Kantvilas (1987)
- Menegazzia monospora Bjerke & Sipman (2007)
- Menegazzia myriotrema (Müll.Arg.) R.Sant. (1942)
- Menegazzia neotropica Bjerke (2002)
- Menegazzia neozelandica (Zahlbr.) P.James (1992)
- Menegazzia nipponica K.H.Moon, Kurok. & Kashiw. (2006)
- Menegazzia norsorediata Adler & Calvelo (1996)
- Menegazzia norstictica P.James (1992)
- Menegazzia nothofagi (Zahlbr.) P.James & D.J.Galloway (1983)
- Menegazzia opuntioides (Müll. Arg.) R.Sant. (1942)
- Menegazzia pedicellata Bjerke (2004)
- Menegazzia pendula P.James, Aptroot, Sérus. & Diederich (2001)
- Menegazzia pertransita (Stirt.) R.Sant. (1942)
- Menegazzia petraea G.Kantvilas (2012)
- Menegazzia platytrema (Müll. Arg.) R.Sant. (1942)
- Menegazzia primaria Aptroot, M.-J.Lai, & Sparrius (2003)
- Menegazzia prototypica P.James (1992)
- Menegazzia pseudocyphellata Aptroot, M.-J.Lai, & Sparrius (2003)
- Menegazzia pulchra P.James & D.J.Galloway (1983)
- Menegazzia ramulicola G.Kantvilas (2012)
- Menegazzia sabahensis Bjerke & Sipman (2007)
- Menegazzia sanguinascens (Räsänen) R.Sant. (1942)
- Menegazzia saxicola P.James & Aptroot (2001)
- Menegazzia sipeana Gyeln. (1934)
- Menegazzia squamatica K.H.Moon, Kurok. & Kashiw. (2006)
- Menegazzia stellata P.James, Aptroot, Sérus. & Diederich (2001)
- Menegazzia stirtonii (Zahlbr.) Kantvilas & Louwhoff (2004)
- Menegazzia subbullata P.James & Kantvilas (1987)
- Menegazzia subpertusa P.James & D.J.Galloway (1983)
- Menegazzia subsimilis (H.Magn.) R.Sant. (1942)
- Menegazzia subtestacea G.Kantvilas (2012)
- Menegazzia tarkinea G.Kantvilas (2012)
- Menegazzia tenuis R.Sant. (1942)
- Menegazzia terebrata (Hoffm.) A.Massal (1854)
- Menegazzia testacea P.James & D.J.Galloway (1983)
- Menegazzia ultralucens P.James & D.J.Galloway (1983)
- Menegazzia valdiviensis (Räsänen) R.Sant. (1942)
- Menegazzia violascens (Räsänen) Bjerke (2005)
- Menegazzia wandae Bjerke (2001)
- Menegazzia weindorferi (Zahlbr.) R.Sant. (1942)
- Menegazzia williamsii Kantvilas (2019)
- Menegazzia wilsonii (Räsänen) Bjerke (2005)
