= Menegazzia athrotaxidis =

Scientific classification
- Domain: Eukaryota
- Kingdom: Fungi
- Division: Ascomycota
- Class: Lecanoromycetes
- Order: Lecanorales
- Family: Parmeliaceae
- Genus: Menegazzia
- Species: M. athrotaxidis

Binomial name
- Menegazzia athrotaxidis Kantvilas (2012)

Species of lichen

Menegazzia athrotaxidis is a species of foliose lichen in the family Parmeliaceae. Found in Australia, the species was described as new to science by Australian lichenologist Gintaras Kantvilas in 2012. The type specimen was collected in Mount Field National Park, southeast of Lake Emmett. Here it was found at an altitude of 980 m (3,220 ft), where it was growing on the bark of pencil pine (Athrotaxis cupressoides) in a mountainous rainforest. The specific epithet refers to the genus of its host. The lichen is only known to occur in the highlands of Tasmania, where it mostly grows on conifers.

== See also ==
- List of Menegazzia species
