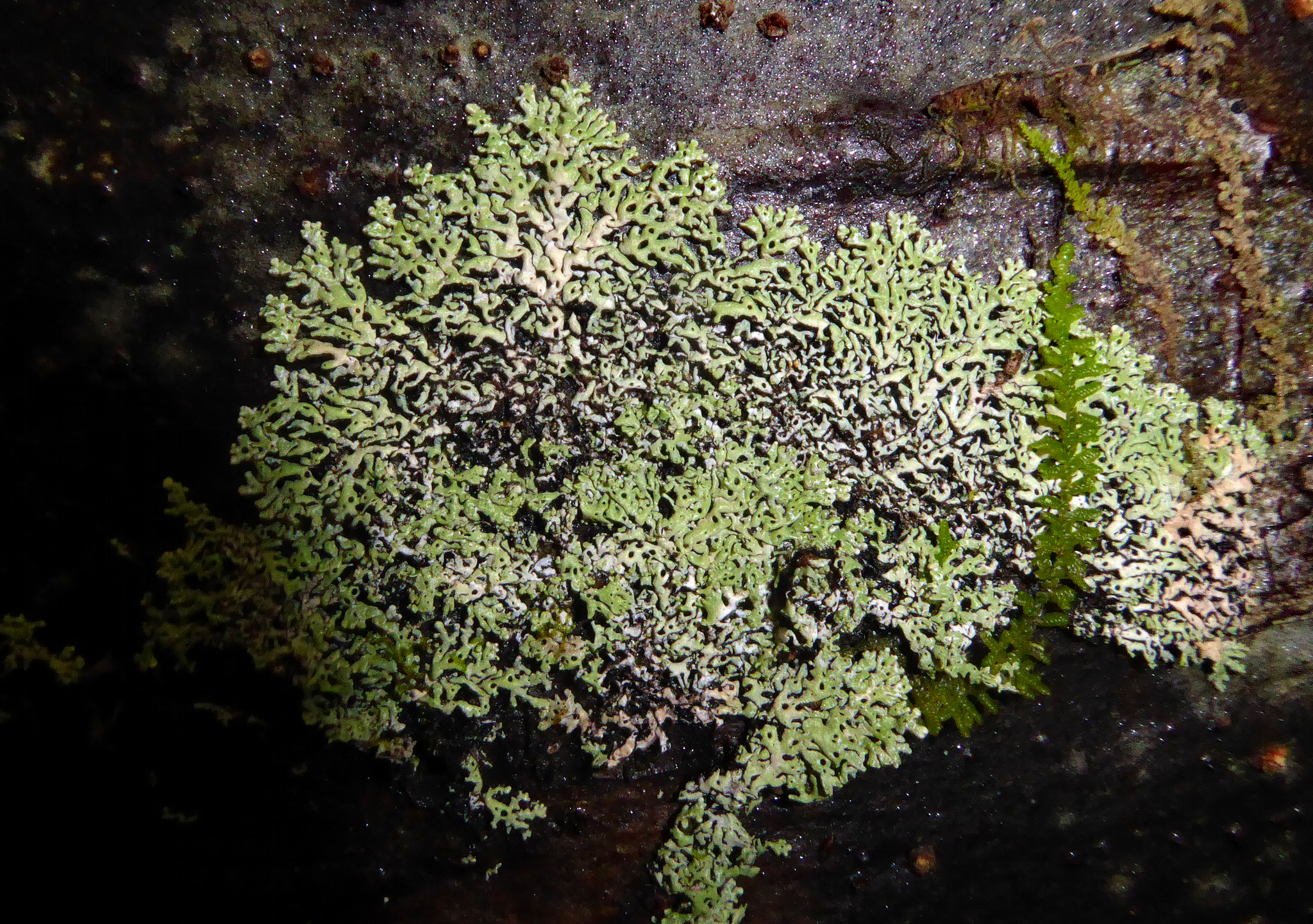

Scientific classification
- Domain: Eukaryota
- Kingdom: Fungi
- Division: Ascomycota
- Class: Lecanoromycetes
- Order: Lecanorales
- Family: Parmeliaceae
- Genus: Menegazzia
- Species: M. nothofagi

Binomial name
- Menegazzia nothofagi (Zahlbr.) P.James & D.J.Galloway (1983)

Synonyms
- Parmelia nothofagi Zahlbr. (1940)

= Menegazzia nothofagi =

Species of lichen

Menegazzia nothofagi is a species of lichen from New Zealand and Australia. It was originally named as a species of Parmelia by Austrian botanist Alexander Zahlbruckner in 1940.

== See also ==
- List of Menegazzia species
