= Menegazzia subbullata =

Scientific classification
- Domain: Eukaryota
- Kingdom: Fungi
- Division: Ascomycota
- Class: Lecanoromycetes
- Order: Lecanorales
- Family: Parmeliaceae
- Genus: Menegazzia
- Species: M. subbullata

Binomial name
- Menegazzia subbullata P.James & Kantvilas (1987)

Species of lichen

Menegazzia subbullata is a species of foliose lichen found in Australia and southern South America. It was formally described as a species new to science in 1987 by lichenologists Peter James and Gintaras Kantvilas. The type specimen was collected in Tasmania, where it was found in a coniferous heath growing on Mount Mawson pine. It has also been found in mainland Australia. Its first report outside of Australasia was in 2002, when it was recorded in Patagonia, Argentina. The lichen has been found to grow both on bark and on rocks.

== See also ==
- List of Menegazzia species
