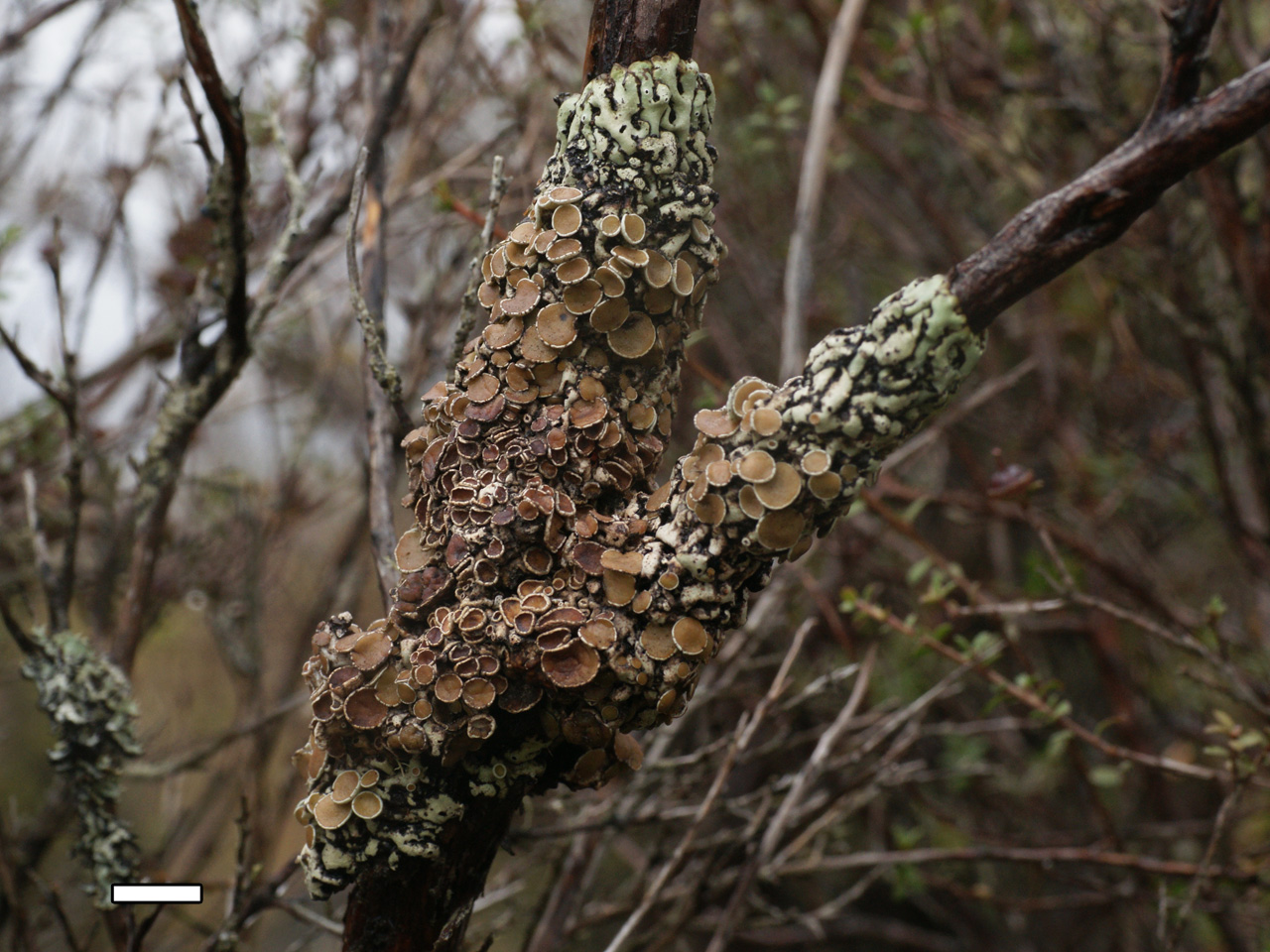
- Menegazzia testacea, on a small tree in the Rangipo Desert, New Zealand. Scale bar = 1 cm

Scientific classification
- Domain: Eukaryota
- Kingdom: Fungi
- Division: Ascomycota
- Class: Lecanoromycetes
- Order: Lecanorales
- Family: Parmeliaceae
- Genus: Menegazzia
- Species: M. testacea

Binomial name
- Menegazzia testacea P.James & D.J.Galloway (1983)

= Menegazzia testacea =

Species of fungus

Menegazzia testacea is a species of lichen found in New Zealand and Australia.

== See also ==
- List of Menegazzia species
