= Menegazzia asekiensis =

Scientific classification
- Domain: Eukaryota
- Kingdom: Fungi
- Division: Ascomycota
- Class: Lecanoromycetes
- Order: Lecanorales
- Family: Parmeliaceae
- Genus: Menegazzia
- Species: M. asekiensis

Binomial name
- Menegazzia asekiensis Elix (2007)

Species of lichen

Menegazzia asekiensis is a species of foliose lichen in the family Parmeliaceae. It was first described in 2007 by John Elix, based on specimens found in Australia.

== See also ==
- List of Menegazzia species
