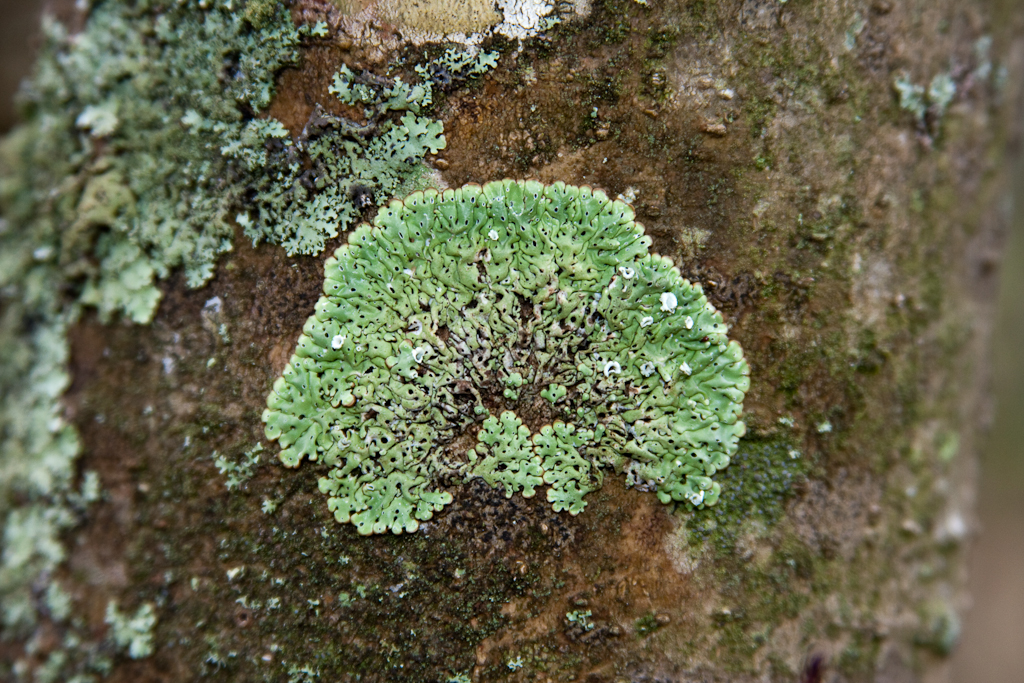
- Found in Great Smoky Mountains National Park, Tennessee

Conservation status
- Secure (NatureServe)

Scientific classification
- Kingdom: Fungi
- Division: Ascomycota
- Class: Lecanoromycetes
- Order: Lecanorales
- Family: Parmeliaceae
- Genus: Menegazzia
- Species: M. subsimilis

Binomial name
- Menegazzia subsimilis (H.Magn.) R.Sant. (1942)

Synonyms
- Parmelia subsimilis H.Magn.; Menegazzia dissecta (Rass.) Hafellner

= Menegazzia subsimilis =

Species of lichen in the family Parmeliaceae

Menegazzia subsimilis is a species of lichen in the family Parmeliaceae It is found scattered across the world, including Oceania (Hawaii, Solomon Islands), Asia (Japan, Papua New Guinea, Russia), Europe (Austria, Germany, Portugal), South America (Ecuador, Peru), the Caribbean (Dominican Republic, Jamaica) and North America (Canada, USA). It has recently been recorded for the first times in Tibet (2005), in the British Isles, and in Malaysia and Indonesia (2007).

The lichen was originally described as Parmelia subsimilis by Swedish lichenologist Adolf Hugo Magnusson in 1941, based on specimens found in Hawaii. A year later, Rolf Santesson transferred the species to the genus Menegazzia. The species was not reported outside of Hawaii until a 1993 collection from southeast Asia.

== See also ==
- List of Menegazzia species
