= Menegazzia magellanica =

Scientific classification
- Domain: Eukaryota
- Kingdom: Fungi
- Division: Ascomycota
- Class: Lecanoromycetes
- Order: Lecanorales
- Family: Parmeliaceae
- Genus: Menegazzia
- Species: M. magellanica

Binomial name
- Menegazzia magellanica R.Sant. (1942)

Species of lichen in the family Parmeliaceae

Menegazzia magellanica is a species of foliose lichen from South America. It was described as a new species in 1942 by Swedish lichenologist Rolf Santesson.

== See also ==
- List of Menegazzia species
