= Menegazzia pseudocyphellata =

Scientific classification
- Domain: Eukaryota
- Kingdom: Fungi
- Division: Ascomycota
- Class: Lecanoromycetes
- Order: Lecanorales
- Family: Parmeliaceae
- Genus: Menegazzia
- Species: M. pseudocyphellata

Binomial name
- Menegazzia pseudocyphellata Aptroot, M.-J.Lai, & Sparrius (2003)

Species of fungus

Menegazzia pseudocyphellata is a species of lichen found in Taiwan. It was identified in 2003 in Taroko National Park on Hehuanshan at an elevation of 3,200 meters.

== See also ==
- List of Menegazzia species
