= Menegazzia pedicellata =

Scientific classification
- Domain: Eukaryota
- Kingdom: Fungi
- Division: Ascomycota
- Class: Lecanoromycetes
- Order: Lecanorales
- Family: Parmeliaceae
- Genus: Menegazzia
- Species: M. pedicellata

Binomial name
- Menegazzia pedicellata Bjerke (2004)

Species of lichen

Menegazzia pedicellata is a species of lichen found in Japan that was described as new to science in 2004 by Norwegian lichenologist Jarle Bjerke. It contains caperatic acid.

== See also ==
- List of Menegazzia species
