= Menegazzia chrysogaster =

Scientific classification
- Domain: Eukaryota
- Kingdom: Fungi
- Division: Ascomycota
- Class: Lecanoromycetes
- Order: Lecanorales
- Family: Parmeliaceae
- Genus: Menegazzia
- Species: M. chrysogaster

Binomial name
- Menegazzia chrysogaster Bjerke & Elvebakk (2001)

Species of lichen in the family Parmeliaceae

Menegazzia chrysogaster is a species of foliose lichen from South America. It was described as new to science in 2001.

== See also ==
- List of Menegazzia species
