= Menegazzia monospora =

Scientific classification
- Domain: Eukaryota
- Kingdom: Fungi
- Division: Ascomycota
- Class: Lecanoromycetes
- Order: Lecanorales
- Family: Parmeliaceae
- Genus: Menegazzia
- Species: M. monospora

Binomial name
- Menegazzia monospora Bjerke & Sipman (2007)

Species of lichen

Menegazzia monospora is a species of foliose lichen from Southeast Asia.

== See also ==
- List of Menegazzia species
