= Menegazzia anteforata =

Scientific classification
- Domain: Eukaryota
- Kingdom: Fungi
- Division: Ascomycota
- Class: Lecanoromycetes
- Order: Lecanorales
- Family: Parmeliaceae
- Genus: Menegazzia
- Species: M. anteforata

Binomial name
- Menegazzia anteforata Aptroot, M.-J.Lai, & Sparrius (2003)

Species of lichen

Menegazzia anteforata is a species of foliose lichen from Taiwan. It was described as new to science in 2003.

== See also ==
- List of Menegazzia species
