= Menegazzia sabahensis =

Scientific classification
- Kingdom: Fungi
- Division: Ascomycota
- Class: Lecanoromycetes
- Order: Lecanorales
- Family: Parmeliaceae
- Genus: Menegazzia
- Species: M. sabahensis

Binomial name
- Menegazzia sabahensis Bjerke & Sipman (2007)

Species of lichen

Menegazzia sabahensis is a species of foliose lichen found in Southeast Asia.

== See also ==
- List of Menegazzia species
