= Menegazzia grandis =

Scientific classification
- Domain: Eukaryota
- Kingdom: Fungi
- Division: Ascomycota
- Class: Lecanoromycetes
- Order: Lecanorales
- Family: Parmeliaceae
- Genus: Menegazzia
- Species: M. grandis

Binomial name
- Menegazzia grandis P.James (1992)

Species of lichen

Menegazzia grandis is a species of foliose lichen found in Australia. It was described as new to science in 1992.

== See also ==
- List of Menegazzia species
