= Menegazzia opuntioides =

Scientific classification
- Domain: Eukaryota
- Kingdom: Fungi
- Division: Ascomycota
- Class: Lecanoromycetes
- Order: Lecanorales
- Family: Parmeliaceae
- Genus: Menegazzia
- Species: M. opuntioides

Binomial name
- Menegazzia opuntioides (Müll.Arg.) R.Sant. (1942)

Synonyms
- Parmelia opuntioides Müll.Arg. (1889)

Species of lichen

Menegazzia opuntioides is a species of foliose lichen from southern South America. It was first formally described as a new species in 1889 by Swiss botanist Johannes Müller Argoviensis, as a species of Parmelia. The type specimen was collected in the Strait of Magellan in southern Chile. Rolf Santesson transferred the taxon to the genus Menegazzia in 1942. Menegazzia opuntioides has also been recorded from Argentina.

== See also ==
- List of Menegazzia species
