= Menegazzia ramulicola =

Scientific classification
- Domain: Eukaryota
- Kingdom: Fungi
- Division: Ascomycota
- Class: Lecanoromycetes
- Order: Lecanorales
- Family: Parmeliaceae
- Genus: Menegazzia
- Species: M. ramulicola

Binomial name
- Menegazzia ramulicola Kantvilas (2012)

Species of lichen

Menegazzia ramulicola is a rare species of foliose lichen in the family Parmeliaceae. Found in Australia, the species was described as new to science by Australian lichenologist Gintaras Kantvilas in 2012. The type specimen was collected in Mount Field National Park (Tasmania) at an altitude of 1,030 m (3,380 ft), where it was growing on the Tasmanian endemic plant narrow leaf orites (Orites revolutus) in a woodland. The specific epithet ramulicola refers to its usual habitat, young twigs.

The medulla of Menegazzia ramulicola contains stictic acid and lecanoric acid. It has a compact thallus that envelops twigs, and has few perforations (these perforations are typically a characteristic feature of genus Menegazzia).

== See also ==
- List of Menegazzia species
