= Menegazzia valdiviensis =

Scientific classification
- Domain: Eukaryota
- Kingdom: Fungi
- Division: Ascomycota
- Class: Lecanoromycetes
- Order: Lecanorales
- Family: Parmeliaceae
- Genus: Menegazzia
- Species: M. valdiviensis

Binomial name
- Menegazzia valdiviensis (Räsänen) R.Sant. (1942)

Synonyms
- Parmelia valdiviensis Räsänen (1937)

Species of lichen in the family Parmeliaceae

Menegazzia valdiviensis is a species of lichen found in South America. It was first described in 1932 as Parmelia valdiviensis by Finnish lichenologist Veli Räsänen. Rolf Santesson transferred it to the genus Menegazzia in 1942.

== See also ==
- List of Menegazzia species
