= Menegazzia myriotrema =

Scientific classification
- Domain: Eukaryota
- Kingdom: Fungi
- Division: Ascomycota
- Class: Lecanoromycetes
- Order: Lecanorales
- Family: Parmeliaceae
- Genus: Menegazzia
- Species: M. myriotrema

Binomial name
- Menegazzia myriotrema (Müll.Arg.) R.Sant. (1942)

Synonyms
- Parmelia myriotrema Müll.Arg. (1896)

Species of lichen

Menegazzia myriotrema is a species of foliose lichen found in Australia.

== See also ==
- List of Menegazzia species
