= Menegazzia capitata =

Scientific classification
- Domain: Eukaryota
- Kingdom: Fungi
- Division: Ascomycota
- Class: Lecanoromycetes
- Order: Lecanorales
- Family: Parmeliaceae
- Genus: Menegazzia
- Species: M. capitata

Binomial name
- Menegazzia capitata Sipman & Bjerke (2007)

Species of lichen

Menegazzia capitata is a species of foliose lichen from Southeast Asia.

== See also ==
- List of Menegazzia species
