= Menegazzia albida =

Scientific classification
- Domain: Eukaryota
- Kingdom: Fungi
- Division: Ascomycota
- Class: Lecanoromycetes
- Order: Lecanorales
- Family: Parmeliaceae
- Genus: Menegazzia
- Species: M. albida

Binomial name
- Menegazzia albida (Zahlbr.) R.Sant. (1942)

Synonyms
- Parmelia cincinnata var. albida Zahlbr. (1917)

Species of lichen

Menegazzia albida is a species of foliose lichen from South America. It was originally described as Parmelia cincinnata var. albida by Austrian botanist Alexander Zahlbruckner in 1917.

== See also ==
- List of Menegazzia species
