= Menegazzia norsorediata =

Scientific classification
- Domain: Eukaryota
- Kingdom: Fungi
- Division: Ascomycota
- Class: Lecanoromycetes
- Order: Lecanorales
- Family: Parmeliaceae
- Genus: Menegazzia
- Species: M. norsorediata

Binomial name
- Menegazzia norsorediata Adler & Calvelo (1996)

Species of lichen in the family Parmeliaceae

Menegazzia norsorediata is a species of lichen from South America. It was described as new to science in 1996.

== See also ==
- List of Menegazzia species
