= Menegazzia weindorferi =

Scientific classification
- Domain: Eukaryota
- Kingdom: Fungi
- Division: Ascomycota
- Class: Lecanoromycetes
- Order: Lecanorales
- Family: Parmeliaceae
- Genus: Menegazzia
- Species: M. weindorferi

Binomial name
- Menegazzia weindorferi (Zahlbr.) R.Sant. (1942)

Synonyms
- Parmelia weindorferi Zahlbr. (1907)

Species of lichen

Menegazzia weindorferi is a species of foliose lichen found in Australia. It was originally described by Austrian botanist Alexander Zahlbruckner as a species of Parmelia in 1907. Rolf Santesson transferred it to Menegazzia in 1942.

== Distribution ==
Menegazzia weindorferi is a southern Australian species with records of occurrence in Victoria and Tasmania

== See also ==
- List of Menegazzia species
