= Menegazzia tenuis =

Scientific classification
- Domain: Eukaryota
- Kingdom: Fungi
- Division: Ascomycota
- Class: Lecanoromycetes
- Order: Lecanorales
- Family: Parmeliaceae
- Genus: Menegazzia
- Species: M. tenuis

Binomial name
- Menegazzia tenuis R.Sant. (1942)

Species of lichen

Menegazzia tenuis is a species of foliose lichen found in southern South America. It was formally described as a new species in 1942 by Swedish lichenologist Rolf Santesson. The type specimen was collected from Puerto Angosto (Desolación Island, Chile) The lichen contains atranorin, lichesterinic acid, and protolichesterinic acid as major lichen products.

== See also ==
- List of Menegazzia species
