= Menegazzia fumarprotocetrarica =

Scientific classification
- Domain: Eukaryota
- Kingdom: Fungi
- Division: Ascomycota
- Class: Lecanoromycetes
- Order: Lecanorales
- Family: Parmeliaceae
- Genus: Menegazzia
- Species: M. fumarprotocetrarica

Binomial name
- Menegazzia fumarprotocetrarica Calvelo & Adler (1996)

Species of lichen

Menegazzia fumarprotocetrarica is a species of corticolous (bark-dwelling), foliose lichen found in South America. It was formally described as a new species in 1996 by Mónica Adler and Susana Calvelo. The type specimen was collected by the second author from Bariloche (Río Negro Province, Argentina). The species epithet refers to the presence of protocetraric acid, a lichen product that is rare in the genus Menegazzia. The lichen grows on the hard bark of Nothofagus alpina, N. dombeyi, and Araucaria araucana.

== See also ==
- List of Menegazzia species
