= Menegazzia dispora =

Scientific classification
- Domain: Eukaryota
- Kingdom: Fungi
- Division: Ascomycota
- Class: Lecanoromycetes
- Order: Lecanorales
- Family: Parmeliaceae
- Genus: Menegazzia
- Species: M. dispora

Binomial name
- Menegazzia dispora (Nyl.) R.Sant. (1942)

Synonyms
- Parmelia dispora Nyl. (1876)

Species of lichen

Menegazzia dispora is a species of corticolous (bark-dwelling), foliose lichen from South America. It was first formally described in an 1876 publication of James Crombie, with authorship attributed to Finnish lichenologist William Nylander. The type specimen was collected as part of a scientific expedition to South America conducted on the Royal Navy survey vessel HMS Nassau. Rolf Santesson transferred it to the genus Menegazzia in 1942.

Lichen products that occur in Menegazzia dispora include atranorin, chloroatranorin, hypostictic acid, hypoconstictic acid, and α-acetylhypoconstictic acid.

== See also ==
- List of Menegazzia species
