= Menegazzia hypernota =

Scientific classification
- Domain: Eukaryota
- Kingdom: Fungi
- Division: Ascomycota
- Class: Lecanoromycetes
- Order: Lecanorales
- Family: Parmeliaceae
- Genus: Menegazzia
- Species: M. hypernota

Binomial name
- Menegazzia hypernota Bjerke (2004)

Species of lichen

Menegazzia hypernota is a species of foliose lichen found in Australasia. It was formally described as a new species in 2004 by Jarle Bjerke from specimens collected in New Zealand. The lichen contains fumarprotocetraric acid as the major lichen product in the medulla. Menegazzia hypernota was reported from Tasmania in 2019.

== See also ==
- List of Menegazzia species
