= Menegazzia primaria =

Scientific classification
- Domain: Eukaryota
- Kingdom: Fungi
- Division: Ascomycota
- Class: Lecanoromycetes
- Order: Lecanorales
- Family: Parmeliaceae
- Genus: Menegazzia
- Species: M. primaria

Binomial name
- Menegazzia primaria Aptroot, M.-J.Lai, & Sparrius (2003)

Species of lichen

Menegazzia primaria is a species of foliose lichen found in Taiwan. It is closely related to Menegazzia terebrata.

== See also ==
- List of Menegazzia species
