= Menegazzia globoisidiata =

Scientific classification
- Domain: Eukaryota
- Kingdom: Fungi
- Division: Ascomycota
- Class: Lecanoromycetes
- Order: Lecanorales
- Family: Parmeliaceae
- Genus: Menegazzia
- Species: M. globoisidiata

Binomial name
- Menegazzia globoisidiata Elix (2007)

Species of fungus

Menegazzia globoisidiata is a species of foliose lichen in the family Parmeliaceae. It was formally described in 2007 by John Elix, based on specimens found in Australia.

== See also ==
- List of Menegazzia species
