= Menegazzia kawesqarica =

Scientific classification
- Domain: Eukaryota
- Kingdom: Fungi
- Division: Ascomycota
- Class: Lecanoromycetes
- Order: Lecanorales
- Family: Parmeliaceae
- Genus: Menegazzia
- Species: M. kawesqarica

Binomial name
- Menegazzia kawesqarica Bjerke & Elvebakk (2001)

Species of lichen

Menegazzia kawesqarica is a species of foliose lichen found in southern South America. It was formally described as a new species in 2001 by lichenologists Jarle Bjerke and Arve Elvebakk. The type specimen was collected by the second author in a depression of a volcanic rock outcrop in Morro Chico (Magallanes Province, Chile). The lichen contains atranorin, stictic acid, cryptostictic acid, menegazziaic acid, and constictic acid as lichen products.

== See also ==
- List of Menegazzia species
