= Menegazzia asahinae =

Scientific classification
- Domain: Eukaryota
- Kingdom: Fungi
- Division: Ascomycota
- Class: Lecanoromycetes
- Order: Lecanorales
- Family: Parmeliaceae
- Genus: Menegazzia
- Species: M. asahinae

Binomial name
- Menegazzia asahinae (Yasuda ex Asahina) R.Sant. (1943)

Synonyms
- Parmelia asahinae Yasuda ex Asahina (1950)

Species of lichen

Menegazzia asahinae is a species of foliose lichen from Japan.

== See also ==
- List of Menegazzia species
