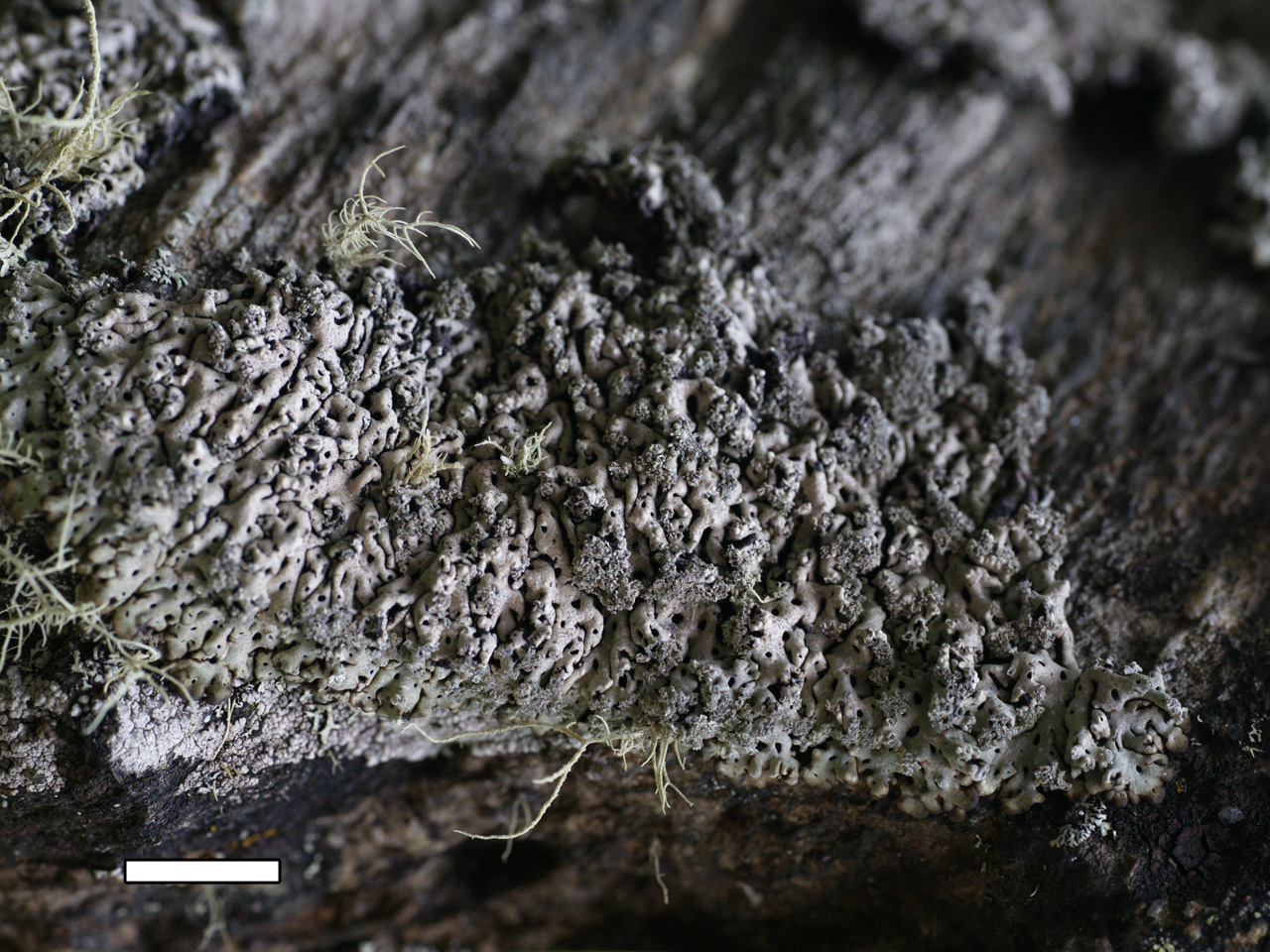
- Menegazzia castanea on a rock outcrop. Rock & Pillar Range, New Zealand. Scale bar = 1 cm.

Scientific classification
- Domain: Eukaryota
- Kingdom: Fungi
- Division: Ascomycota
- Class: Lecanoromycetes
- Order: Lecanorales
- Family: Parmeliaceae
- Genus: Menegazzia
- Species: M. castanea

Binomial name
- Menegazzia castanea P.James & D.J.Galloway (1983)

= Menegazzia castanea =

Species of lichen

Menegazzia castanea is a species of foliose lichen from New Zealand and Australia.

== See also ==
- List of Menegazzia species
