= Menegazzia neotropica =

Scientific classification
- Domain: Eukaryota
- Kingdom: Fungi
- Division: Ascomycota
- Class: Lecanoromycetes
- Order: Lecanorales
- Family: Parmeliaceae
- Genus: Menegazzia
- Species: M. neotropica

Binomial name
- Menegazzia neotropica Bjerke (2002)

Species of lichen in the family Parmeliaceae

Menegazzia neotropica is a species of lichen from the Neotropics. It was described as new to science in 2002 by Norwegian lichenologist Jarle Bjerke.

== See also ==
- List of Menegazzia species
