= Menegazzia foraminulosa =

Scientific classification
- Domain: Eukaryota
- Kingdom: Fungi
- Division: Ascomycota
- Class: Lecanoromycetes
- Order: Lecanorales
- Family: Parmeliaceae
- Genus: Menegazzia
- Species: M. foraminulosa

Binomial name
- Menegazzia foraminulosa (Kremp.) Bitter (1901)

Synonyms
- Parmelia foraminulosa Kremp. (1876)

Species of lichen

Menegazzia foraminulosa is a species of corticolous (bark-dwelling), foliose lichen that is endemic to New Zealand. The lichen was first formally described as a new species in 1876 by August von Krempelhuber. Friedrich Bitter transferred it to the genus Menegazzia in 1901. The species contains several lichen products, including depsides (atranorin and chloroatranorin), depsidones (stictic acid, constictic acid, norstictic acid, and menegazziaic acids), as well as fatty acids and pigments.

== See also ==
- List of Menegazzia species
