= Menegazzia dielsii =

Scientific classification
- Domain: Eukaryota
- Kingdom: Fungi
- Division: Ascomycota
- Class: Lecanoromycetes
- Order: Lecanorales
- Family: Parmeliaceae
- Genus: Menegazzia
- Species: M. dielsii

Binomial name
- Menegazzia dielsii (Hillmann) R.Sant. (1943)

Synonyms
- Parmelia dielsii Hillmann (1940)

Species of lichen

Menegazzia dielsii is a species of foliose lichen from New Zealand. It was first formally described by German lichenologist Johannes Hillmann in 1940. Rolf Santesson transferred it to the genus Menegazzia in 1943. It contains several lichen products: atranorin, conpsoromic acid, echinocarpic acid, and psoromic acid.

== See also ==
- List of Menegazzia species
