= Davidgallowaya =

Scientific classification
- Domain: Eukaryota
- Kingdom: Fungi
- Division: Ascomycota
- Class: Lecanoromycetes
- Order: Lecanorales
- Family: Parmeliaceae
- Genus: Davidgallowaya; Aptroot (2007)

Type species
- Davidgallowaya cornutispora Aptroot (2007)

Genus of fungi

Davidgallowaya is a genus of lichenized fungi in the family Parmeliaceae. The genus is monotypic, containing the single corticolous species Davidgallowaya cornutispora, found in Papua New Guinea. Davidgallowaya was circumscribed by Dutch lichenologist André Aptroot in 2007. The genus name honours David Galloway (1942–2014).

== See also ==
- List of Parmeliaceae genera
