= Menegazzia elongata =

Scientific classification
- Domain: Eukaryota
- Kingdom: Fungi
- Division: Ascomycota
- Class: Lecanoromycetes
- Order: Lecanorales
- Family: Parmeliaceae
- Genus: Menegazzia
- Species: M. elongata

Binomial name
- Menegazzia elongata P.James (1992)

Species of lichen

Menegazzia elongata is a species of corticolous (bark-dwelling), foliose lichen found in Australia. It was formally described as a new species by lichenologist Peter J. James in 1992. The type specimen was collected by Leif Tibell in Tasmania.

== See also ==
- List of Menegazzia species
