= Menegazzia enteroxantha =

Scientific classification
- Domain: Eukaryota
- Kingdom: Fungi
- Division: Ascomycota
- Class: Lecanoromycetes
- Order: Lecanorales
- Family: Parmeliaceae
- Genus: Menegazzia
- Species: M. enteroxantha

Binomial name
- Menegazzia enteroxantha (Müll.Arg.) R.Sant. (1942)

Species of lichen

Menegazzia enteroxantha is a species of foliose lichen found in Australia. It was first formally described as a new to science by Swiss botanist Johannes Müller Argoviensis in 1896, as a species of Parmelia. Rolf Santesson transferred the taxon to genus Menegazzia in 1942.

== See also ==
- List of Menegazzia species
