= Menegazzia globulifera =

Scientific classification
- Domain: Eukaryota
- Kingdom: Fungi
- Division: Ascomycota
- Class: Lecanoromycetes
- Order: Lecanorales
- Family: Parmeliaceae
- Genus: Menegazzia
- Species: M. globulifera

Binomial name
- Menegazzia globulifera R.Sant. (1942)

Species of lichen

Menegazzia globulifera is a species of foliose lichen found in New Zealand, Australia, and southern South America. It was formally described as a species new to science in 1942 by Swedish lichenologist Rolf Santesson. The type specimen was collected north of Lago Fagnano (Tierra del Fuego, Argentina). The lichen is typically encountered as an epiphyte, but occasionally it has been recorded growing on rocks. Menegazzia globulifera contains usnic acid and lecanoric acid as major lichen products.

== See also ==
- List of Menegazzia species
