= Amphorothecium =

Scientific classification
- Kingdom: Fungi
- Division: Ascomycota
- Class: Lecanoromycetes
- Subclass: Ostropomycetidae
- Genus: Amphorothecium; P.M.McCarthy, Kantvilas & Elix

Type species
- Amphorothecium occultum P.M.McCarthy, Kantvilas & Elix (2001)

Genus of fungi

Amphorothecium is a genus of fungi belonging to the family Myeloconidiaceae.

The genus was first described by Patrick McCarthy, Gintaras Kantvilas & Jack Elix in 2001. There are no synonyms.
