= Menegazzia aeneofusca =

Scientific classification
- Domain: Eukaryota
- Kingdom: Fungi
- Division: Ascomycota
- Class: Lecanoromycetes
- Order: Lecanorales
- Family: Parmeliaceae
- Genus: Menegazzia
- Species: M. aeneofusca

Binomial name
- Menegazzia aeneofusca (Müll.Arg.) R.Sant. (1942)

Synonyms
- Parmelia aeneofusca Müll.Arg. (1883)

Species of fungus

Menegazzia aeneofusca is a species of lichen from South America, New Zealand, and Australia.

== See also ==
- List of Menegazzia species
