= Menegazzia platytrema =

Scientific classification
- Domain: Eukaryota
- Kingdom: Fungi
- Division: Ascomycota
- Class: Lecanoromycetes
- Order: Lecanorales
- Family: Parmeliaceae
- Genus: Menegazzia
- Species: M. platytrema

Binomial name
- Menegazzia platytrema (Müll.Arg.) R.Sant. (1942)

Synonyms
- Parmelia platytrema Müll.Arg. (1887)

Species of lichen

Menegazzia platytrema is a species of lichen found in Australia.

== See also ==
- List of Menegazzia species
