= Veli Räsänen =

Finnish lichenologist (1888–1953)

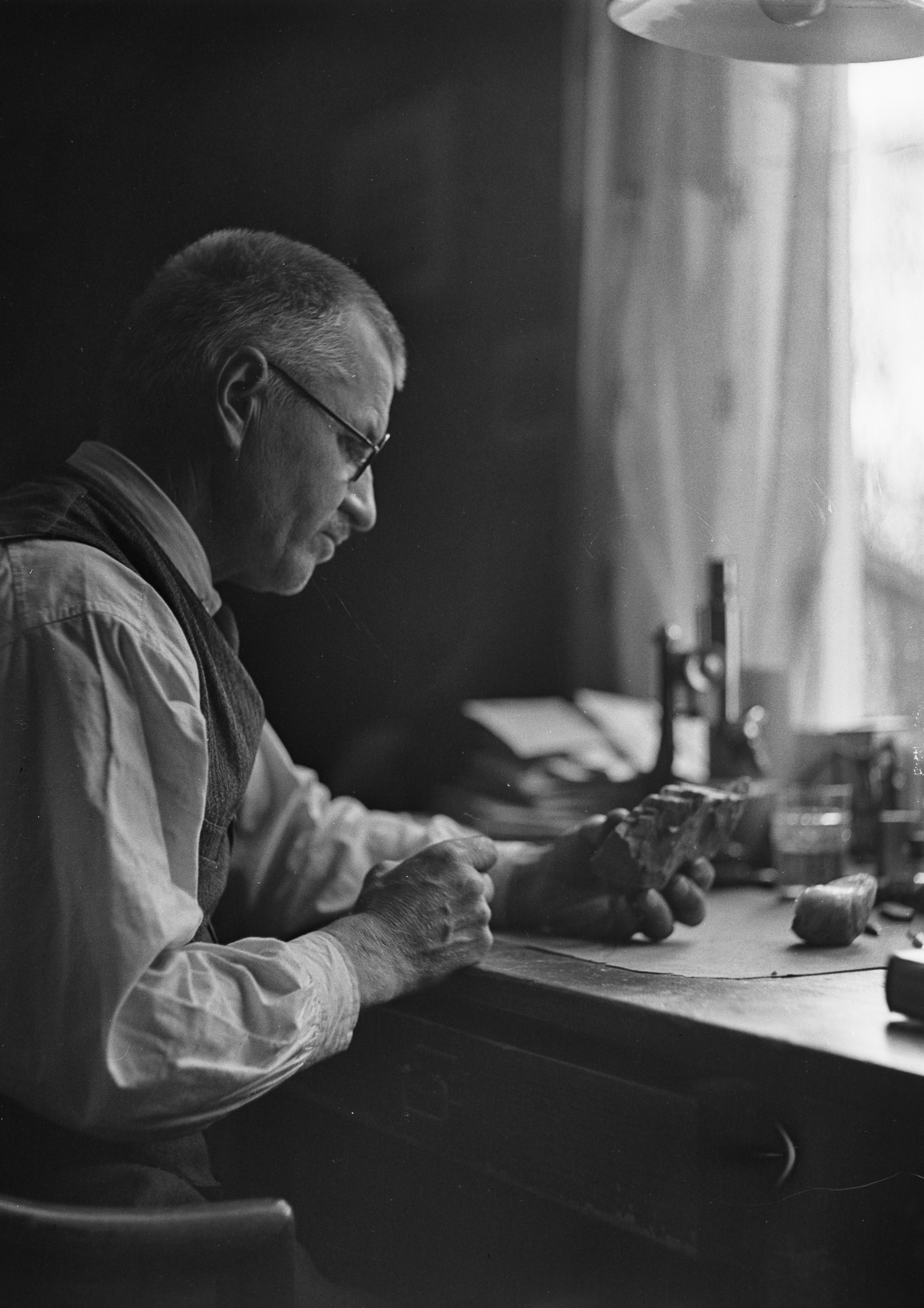
- Veli Räsänen in 1951
- Born: 24 August 1888; Simo, Finland
- Died: 16 July 1953 (aged 64); Simo, Finland
- Education: University of Helsinki
- Scientific career
- Fields: Lichenology
- Author abbrev. (botany): Räsänen

Veli Johannes Paavo Bartholomeus Räsänen (24 August 1888 – 16 July 1953) was a Finnish lichenologist who made contributions to the study and documentation of Nordic and Baltic lichen funga. As a lecturer at various agricultural institutions and the University of Kuopio, he published extensive systematic and floristic works on lichens in Finland, Estonia, and the Petsamo region, including his comprehensive 1951 guide Suomen jäkäläkasvio (Finnish Lichens). Räsänen curated two major lichen exsiccatae collections, compiling over 1,750 specimens between 1935 and 1952, and described numerous previously unknown lichen taxa. His influence on the field is reflected in several lichen species and two genera named in his honour, and his work with mentor Edvard Vainio helped establish Finland's strong tradition in lichenology.

== Early life and education ==
Veli Räsänen was born on 24 August 1888 in Simo, Finland. Räsänen's brother was the linguist Martti Räsänen. His parents were primary school teachers Antti Räsänen, and Kaisa Sofia Vuolevi. He took his matriculation examination in 1909 in Oulu, and graduated with a Bachelor of Arts in 1913, a master's degree in 1914 and a licentiate and doctorate in 1927 from the University of Helsinki. Räsänen worked at the Lapua agricultural lyceum for teachers from 1918 to 1921 teaching natural sciences and animal husbandry. He was an instructor in the Agricultural School (Kurkijoen maamiesopisto), as a lecturer from 1921 to 1940. Räsänen became a college lecturer from 1940 to 1953 in Kuopio. He published literature on lichens, including the book Suomen jäkäläkasvio ("Finnish Lichens") (1951). With Viktor Jalmari Kivenheimo he curated and distributed an exsiccata-like series of dried herbarium specimens of lichens, namely Suomen Jäkäliä toimittaneet J. Kivenheimo ja V. Räsänen (1915).

Räsänen apprenticed with Edvard Vainio at the University of Turku, and eagerly collected lichens during his student years. His first publications were about beard lichens and other interesting lichen finds. His first major dissertation, published in 1926, concerned the lichen flora in North Ostrobothnia. His dissertation for the licentiate degree was titled Über Flechtenstandorte und Flechtenvegetation im westlichen Nordfinnland ("About lichen locations and lichen vegetation in western northern Finland"). This work was followed by several extensive works of mainly systematic and floristic content: about Estonian lichens (1931), about the lichen flora of Eidslandet (1932); about the lichens in the coastal areas of northern Lake Ladoga (1939), and on the lichens of the Petsamo Province (1943). In a study of lichens in the Pechenga area, he catalogued more than 520 taxa. He also described several species of lichenicolous fungi.

Räsänen was a devoted researcher and worked quickly. He was happy to be sent lichen collections, e.g. from the University of Helsinki Botanical Garden. He also received and completed collections from abroad, defining numerous lichen taxa previously unknown to science. In Kuopio, he became one of the central personalities of the natural history association.

Räsänen made extensive collections of lichens and used a large part of this material for the compilation of two exsiccatae. Thus, under his auspices, the exsiccata work Lichenes Fenniae Exsiccati, previously published by Johan Petter Norrlin and William Nylander, and later Vainio, was continued by the Botanical Museum in Helsinki. Räsänen curated and compiled 20 fascicles on a total of 1,000 issues during the years 1935–1946. In Kuopio he compiled the exsiccata Lichenotheca Fennica a Museo Kuopioensi edita, 30 fascicles during the years 1946–1952, comprising a total of 750 issues (25 issues in each fascicle, in the Helsinki exsiccata 50 numbers per fascicle).

Räsänen tried to arouse interest in studying and collecting lichens among younger people. In this respect, mention should be made of his novice book Suomen jäkäläkasvio ("Finnish lichens") (1951), comprising 158 pages and 16 paintings.

Räsänen died on 16 July 1953 in Simo.

== Eponymy ==
Several lichen species have been named in honour of Veli Räsänen. These include: Caloplaca raesaenenii Bredkina (1986); Lecanora raesaenenii Gyeln. (1933); Pertusaria raesaenenii Erichsen (1934); Usnea raesaenenii Bystrek (1994); and Verrucaria raesaenenii Pykälä & Myllys (2019). The genera Raesaenenia D.Hawksw., Boluda & H.Lindgr. (2015) and Raesaeneniana S.Y.Kondr., Kärnefelt, A.Thell, Elix & Hur (2015) are also named after him.

== Selected publications ==
- Räsänen, V.J.P.B. (1933). "Contribution to the Lichen Flora of North America". Annals of the Missouri Botanical Garden. 20 (1): 7–21. doi:10.2307/2394419. JSTOR 2394419.
- Räsänen, V. (1943). "Das System der Flechten. Übersicht mit Bestimmungstabellen der natürlichen Flechtenfamilien, ihrher Gattungen, Untergattungen, Sektionen un Untersektionen". Acta Botanica Fennica (in German). 33: 3–82.

== See also ==
- Category:Taxa named by Veli Räsänen
