= David Galloway (botanist) =

New Zealand botanist and lichenologist

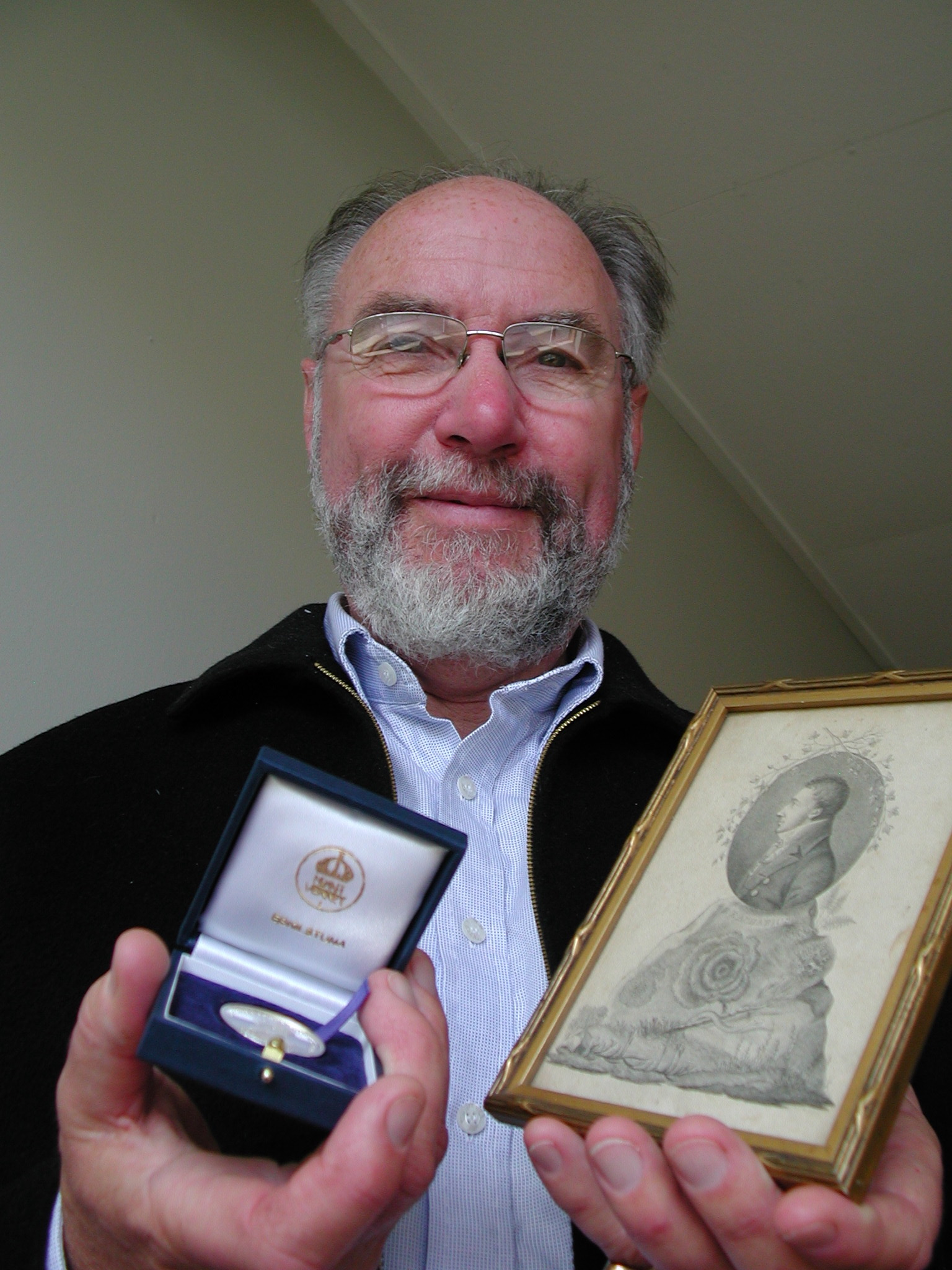
- Galloway in 2008
- Born: 7 May 1942; Invercargill, New Zealand
- Died: 6 December 2014 (aged 72); Dunedin, New Zealand
- Education: University of Otago
- Known for: Flora of New Zealand: Lichens; 1st edition, 1988; 2nd edition, 2007
- Spouse: Patricia Payne (m. 1974)
- Awards: Acharius Medal (2008); Hutton Medal (2010)
- Scientific career
- Fields: Lichenology
- Workplaces: Natural History Museum, London; Landcare Research
- Author abbrev. (botany): D.J.Galloway

David John Galloway FRGS, FLS, FRSNZ (7 May 1942 – 6 December 2014) was a biochemist, botanist, and lichenologist.

== Biography ==
Galloway grew up in Invercargill. After graduation from Southland Boys' High School, he studied at the University of Otago. As an undergraduate he assisted James Murray, the first New Zealand lichenologist of the twentieth century, and this experience influenced the direction of his scientific career. There he graduated in 1963 with B.Sc., in 1965 with M.Sc., and in 1972 with Ph.D. — all three degrees in biochemistry. At the University of Otago, he was from 1963 to 1965 a fellow and tutor at Knox College and from 1965 to 1968 an assistant lecturer in biochemistry. He became in 1969 a scientific officer in the Applied Biochemistry Division of New Zealand's Department of Scientific and Industrial Research (DSIR) in Palmerston North. He participated in the 1970 Three Kings Islands expedition as a botanist. He transferred in 1973 to the Botany Division DSIR in Lincoln. His superiors in the Botany Division DSIR helped him gain secondment to the Department of Botany at the British Museum (Natural History) (now called the Natural History Museum, London). There he worked from 1973 to 1982 with Peter W. James on what eventually became the book Flora of New Zealand: Lichens. In the same department, Galloway was from 1982 to 1987 a senior research fellow. His 662-page book Flora of New Zealand: Lichens was published in 1985. The book was the first comprehensive account of New Zealand's lichens, although it covered only about 60% of the existing lichen flora.

In the Lichen/Bryophyte Division, Environmental Quality Programme, Department of Botany, Natural History Museum, London, David Galloway was from 1987 to 1990 the principal scientific officer and from 1990 to 1994 the head of the Programme. In 1974 in Westminster, London, he married the opera singer Patricia Payne (who was born in Dunedin, New Zealand). In late 1994 David and his wife returned to New Zealand. From 1995 until his retirement in 2008, he was a member of Biosystematics of New Zealand Plants Programme of New Zealand's Landcare Research (which is one of New Zealand's Crown Research Institutes).

He was the author or coauthor of over 300 scientific publications. He collected lichens with Brian Coppins, Gerardo Guzmán, and Peter W. James.

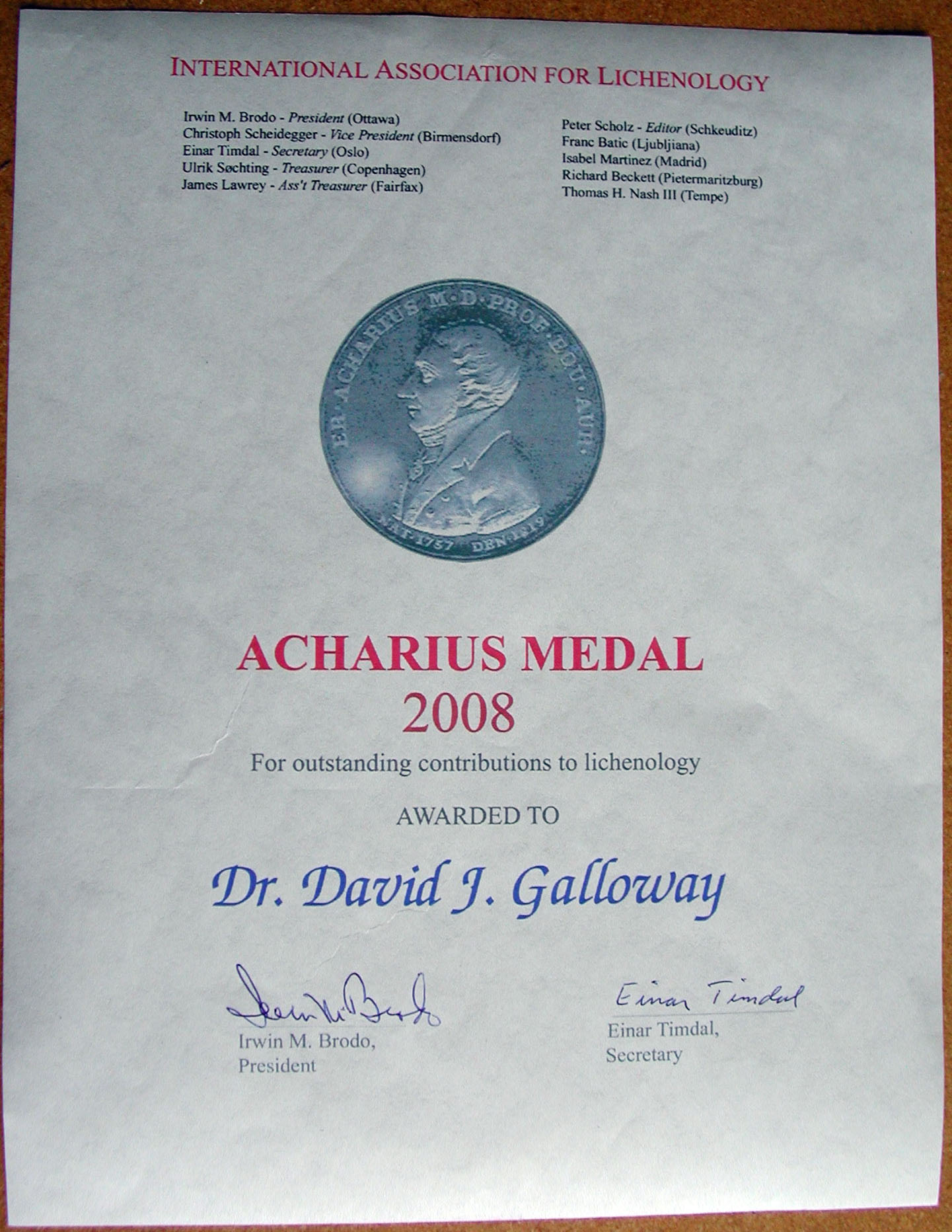
Certificate accompanying the Acharius Medal 2008 awarded to Dr. David J. Galloway for outstanding contributions to lichenology.

Galloway was president from 1987 to 1992 of the International Association for Lichenology (IAL). In 1988 the University of Otago awarded him an honorary D.Sc. in botany. He was elected a Fellow of the Linnean Society of London (FLS) in 1991 and a Fellow of the Royal Society of New Zealand (FRSNZ) in 1998. Knox College, Otago appointed him Quinquennial Fellow in 2006. In 2007 a festschrift was published in his honour. Galloway was awarded the Acharius Medal 2008 for outstanding contributions to lichenology.

In 2007, a genus of fungi in the Ascomycota phylum was named Gallaicolichen, and also Davidgallowaya, which is a genus of lichenized fungi in the family Parmeliaceae, both genera were named in his honour.

In 2011 Galloway was elected a Foreign Member of Sweden's Royal Society of Arts and Sciences in Gothenburg.

== Selected publications ==
- Galloway, David J. (1980). The Lichen Genera Argopsis and Stereocaulon in New Zealand.
- Galloway, D. J. (1983). "New taxa in the New Zealand lichen flora". New Zealand Journal of Botany. 21 (2): 191–199. Bibcode:1983NZJB...21..191G. doi:10.1080/0028825x.1983.10428544.
- Galloway, D. J. (1985). "Lichenology in the South Pacific, 1790–1840". Archives of Natural History. 1 (1): 205–214. doi:10.3366/anh.1985.017.
- Hayward, Bruce W.; Hayward, Glenys C.; Galloway, David J. (1986). "Lichens of Great Barrier and adjacent islands, northern New Zealand". Journal of the Royal Society of New Zealand. 16 (2): 121–137. Bibcode:1986JRSNZ..16..121H. doi:10.1080/03036758.1986.10418173.
- Galloway, David J. (1992). Checklist of New Zealand Lichens. DSIR Land Resources. ISBN 9780477026468.
- Galloway, D. J. (1992). "Biodiversity: A lichenological perspective". Biodiversity and Conservation. 1 (4): 312–323. Bibcode:1992BiCon...1..312G. doi:10.1007/BF00693767. S2CID 10028665.
- Galloway, D. J. (1994). "Studies on the Lichen Genus Sticta (Schreber) Ach.: I. Southern South American Species". The Lichenologist. 26 (3): 223–282. Bibcode:1994ThLic..26..223G. doi:10.1006/lich.1994.1019. S2CID 83972318.
- Galloway, D. J. (1997). "Studies on the Lichen Genus Sticta (Schreber) Ach. IV. New Zealand Species". The Lichenologist. 29 (2): 105–168. Bibcode:1997ThLic..29..105G. doi:10.1006/lich.1996.0066. S2CID 83703903.
- Perry, Nigel B.; Benn, Michael H.; Brennan, Nerida J.; Burgess, Elaine J.; Ellis, Gill; Galloway, David J.; Lorimer, Stephen D.; Tangney, Raymond S. (1999). "Antimicrobial, Antiviral and Cytotoxic Activity of New Zealand Lichens". The Lichenologist. 31 (6): 627–636. Bibcode:1999ThLic..31..627P. doi:10.1006/lich.1999.0241. S2CID 86005089.
- Galloway, D. J. (2008). "Lichen biogeography". In Nash, Thomas H (ed.). Lichen Biology. pp. 315–335. doi:10.1017/CBO9780511790478.017. ISBN 9780511790478.
- De Lange, PJ; Galloway, DJ; Blanchon, DJ; Knight, A.; Rolfe, JR; Crowcroft, GM; Hitchmough, R. (2012). "Conservation status of New Zealand lichens". New Zealand Journal of Botany. 50 (3): 303–363. Bibcode:2012NZJB...50..303D. doi:10.1080/0028825X.2012.691426. S2CID 85254285.

== See also ==
- Category:Taxa named by David Galloway (botanist)
