= Gintaras Kantvilas =

Australian lichenologist

- Born: 1956
- Education: University of Tasmania
- Occupations: Lichenologist; botanist; botanical collector
- Academic career
- Institutions: Tasmanian Herbarium
- Thesis: Studies on Tasmanian rainforest lichens
- Author abbrev. (botany): Kantvilas

Gintaras Kantvilas (born 1956) is an Australian lichenologist, who earned his Ph.D. in 1985 from the University of Tasmania with the thesis Studies on Tasmanian rainforest lichens. He has authored over 432 species names, and 167 genera in the field of mycology.

Kanvilas completed his secondary education at St Virgil's College in Hobart in 1973.

In 1985, he was working for the Tasmanian National Parks and Wildlife Service. In 1987 he was listing his affiliation as Department of Botany, University of Tasmania, in addition to the Tasmanian National Parks and Wildlife Service. By 2001 his affiliation was listed as the Tasmanian Herbarium, and this has continued until at least 2018.

The lichen genera Gintarasia and Kantvilasia are named in his honour.

The standard author abbreviation Kantvilas is used to indicate this person as the author when citing a botanical name.

== Some genera authored ==
- Ramboldia Kantvilas & Elix
- Amphorothecium P.M.McCarthy, Kantvilas & Elix

== See also ==
- Category:Taxa named by Gintaras Kantvilas
