= Peter Wilfred James =

English botanist and lichenologist

- Born: 28 April 1930; St Just in Roseland, Cornwall
- Died: 13 February 2014 (aged 83); Birmingham, UK
- Citizenship: UK
- Education: University of Liverpool
- Awards: Acharius Medal (1992)
- Scientific career
- Fields: Lichenology
- Workplaces: Natural History Museum, London
- Doctoral students: David Hawksworth; Gintaras Kantvilas
- Author abbrev. (botany): P.James

Peter Wilfred James (1930–2014) was an English botanist and lichenologist. He was a pioneer in the study of lichens as environmental indicators, especially of atmospheric pollution.

== Early life and education ==
Peter W. James grew up in Sutton Coldfield, which was then a rural suburb of Birmingham and his interests in natural history and exploring the countryside were encouraged by his older sister. His father was a headteacher. James attended Bishop Vesey's Grammar School in Warwickshire from 1943 until 1949. He was awarded a state scholarship that supported his university study. He graduated with a First class B.Sc. in botany from the University of Liverpool in 1952 with a minor in zoology (1951). There he enrolled as a Ph.D. student with the intention of studying lichenology, having been inspired after a visit to Bala in North Wales. However his supervisor, S. Burfield, died. At this time very few scientists specialised in the study of lichens. His new supervisor advised James to take up a vacation studentship in London. The result was that James discontinued his PhD and became employed by the Natural History Museum, London. He was called up for 2 years of National Service in 1955 - 1957. He was placed within signals regiments. At one point he was sent to Bavaria, and managed to meet up with the lichenologist Josef Poelt.

== Career ==
In 1955 he was employed by London's Natural History Museum initially as a summer student and then as a lichen specialist. After his National Service James spent his career there and became a deputy Keeper of Botany. He became a central figure in British lichenology, nurturing and developing the field for approximately thirty years. One of his early ambitions was to produce an updated lichen checklist to align British nomenclature with Continental standards, a task he approached with considerable dedication. During his career he had a central role in the development of lichenology in the UK. He built up the lichen collections to be a major international resource as well as expanding the expertise and collaborations within the museum. He collaborated with Dougal Swinscow, who had a key role in developing lichenology in the UK in the late 1950s. Their collaboration extended beyond formal work, with regular lunchtime meetings in London and joint field excursions to remote areas including Inchnadamph, Assynt, Connemara and south-west Ireland, where they documented rare Atlantic lichen species. As well as mentoring and collaborating with new lichenologists, he published extensively and was active in forming an academic community. His influence was felt by the lichenologists Oliver Gilbert, David Hawksworth, Mark Seaward, Pat Wolseley and Brian Fox.

At the Natural History Museum, James created what many considered the spiritual home of lichenology in Britain. He welcomed visitors to the herbarium with characteristic courtesy, often greeting them with "Now, is there anything I can get for you?" before providing desk space where they could examine specimens or receive assistance with identification. He was known for his accessibility and genuine interest in the work of others, providing encouragement to newcomers and experienced lichenologists alike. He acknowledged significant support in his early career from Ursula Duncan, who lent him reference materials and with whom he later collaborated extensively.

James was also important in the founding of several scientific organisations and journals about lichenology. James was one of those involved in founding the British Lichen Society and was the first editor of The Lichenologist (1958–1977). He was a founder member, acting treasurer and first president of the International Association for Lichenology and co-ordinated its first field meeting in the Austrian Alps in 1971.

James was primarily a field scientist personally surveying many sites in the British Isles and he considered that he had seen over 90% of the lichens found in the British Isles in their natural habitats. He organised private field trips to climatically favoured islands such as Lundy, the Isles of Scilly and islands off the Pembrokeshire coast. His inability to drive meant he required companions for fieldwork, creating opportunities for other lichenologists to benefit from his expertise. He surveyed many areas that were, or became, protected because of their biological inhabitants. Throughout his career he acted as a tutor at Field Studies Council thus training future lichenologists. He also led visits and expeditions in the UK and abroad including to temperate South America as well as Australia, New Zealand, North Greenland and the Atlantic islands. However he also had a very substantial role in the organisation and publication of works about lichen taxonomy. In 1962 James was seconded to the University of Otago, New Zealand for 6 months to curate the specimens collected by James Murray. While there, James also collected more specimens. He made a second visit to New Zealand in 1981.

Lichenology in the UK was improved by his own and collaborative books about lichen identification, especially his New Checklist of British Lichens (1965) and his contributions to Ursula Duncan's Introduction to British Lichens (1970) and Lichen Flora of Great Britain and Ireland (1992) edited by Ole William Purvis. His retirement from the Natural History Museum in 1990, along with Jack Laundon's departure, marked a significant transition in British lichenology, with the centre of activity gradually shifting to Scotland. Although he retired in 1990 he continued to be active in lichenology. He was one of the founders of the charity Plantlife in 1990 and acted as its vice-president and as a trustee for a time.

His interest in the effects of air quality on lichens began in the 1970, particularly after a visit to an aluminium smelter on Anglesey. He was involved in many field surveys as well as publishing and providing training about lichens and air quality.

James was the author or co-author of several scientific publications that made advances to the knowledge of lichen morphology, taxonomy and community ecology. These included on the nature of cephalodia, the genus of foliose lichens Nephroma and the first overview of lichen communities in the British Isles.

== Personal life ==
James was also a collector of UK stamps, specialising in those from the Edwardian period to King George V and of cacti. His collection of cacti comprised about 600 species, with his main collection housed at his sister's home in the Midlands which he visited at weekends. His other notable characteristics included never learning to drive or use a computer, and having an apprehension of mobile phones. He retired in 1990 and died in 2014. He was never married.

James was known for his formal yet approachable demeanour and his skill as a cook who took pride in planning unusual menus. His home contained extensive collections of books and music, with a particular appreciation for Bach and Berlioz. Though dedicated to his professional work, he maintained a healthy work-life balance, treating lichenology as both his occupation and recreation.

== Selected publications ==
James was the author or co-author of scientific publications including:

- James, P. W. (2007). "A New Check-List of British Lichens". The Lichenologist. 3 (1): 95–153. doi:10.1017/S0024282965000130. ISSN 0024-2829.
- James, P. W. (1970). "The Lichen Flora of Shaded Acid Rock Crevices and Overhangs in Britain". The Lichenologist. 4 (4): 309–322. doi:10.1017/S0024282970000403.
- James, P. W.; Vězda, A. (1971). "Melanophloea P. James & Vězda, A New Lichen Genus". The Lichenologist. 5 (1–2): 89–91. doi:10.1017/S0024282971000112.
- Rose, F.; James, P. W. (1974). "Regional Studies on the British Lichen Flora I. The Corticolous and Lignicolous Species of the New Forest, Hampshire". The Lichenologist. 6: 1–72. doi:10.1017/S002428297400003X.
- James, P. W.; Henssen, Aino (1976). "Morphological and taxonomic significance of cephalodia". In Brown, D. H.; Hawksworth, D. L.; Bailey, R. H. (eds.). Lichenology: Progress and Problems; Proceedings of an International Symposium held at the University of Bristol in April 1974. Systematics Association special volume, no. 8. London; New York: Published for the Systematics Association and the British Lichen Society by Academic Press. ISBN 978012136750320 symposium papers; xii+551 pages, 33 unnumbered leaves of plates : illustrations; 24 cm. (over 175 citations)
- James, P. W.; Hawksworth, David L.; Rose, Francis (1977). "Lichen communities in the British Isles: a preliminary conspectus". In Seaward, M.R.D. (ed.). Lichen Ecology. Academic Press. pp. 295–413.
- Bailey, R. H.; James, P. W. (1979). "Birds and the Dispersal of Lichen Propagules". The Lichenologist. 11: 105–106. doi:10.1017/S0024282979000141. (over 60 citations)
- Hawksworth, D. L.; James, P. W.; Coppins, B. J. (1980). "Checklist of British Lichen-Forming, Lichenicolous and Allied Fungi". The Lichenologist. 12: 1–115. doi:10.1017/S0024282980000035. (over 250 citations)
- Jørgensen, P. M.; James, P. W. (1983). "Studies on Some Leptogium Species of Western Europe". The Lichenologist. 15 (2): 109–125. doi:10.1017/S0024282983000183.
- Elix, JA; Jones, AJ; Lajide, LCBJ; James, PW (1984). "Two new diphenyl ethers and a new depside from the lichen Micarea prasina Fr". Australian Journal of Chemistry. 37 (11): 2349. doi:10.1071/CH9842349.
- Galloway, D. J.; James, P. W. (1985). "The Lichen Genus Psoromidium Stirton". The Lichenologist. 17 (2): 173–188. doi:10.1017/S0024282985000226.
- Purvis, O. W.; James, P. W. (1985). "Lichens of the Coniston Copper Mines". The Lichenologist. 17 (3): 221–237. doi:10.1017/S0024282985000299.
- Elix, JA; Gaul, KL; James, PW (1985). "α-Acetylhypoconstictic Acid, a New Depsidone from the Lichen Menegazzia dispora". Australian Journal of Chemistry. 38 (11): 1735. doi:10.1071/CH9851735.
- Elix, JA; Jenie, UA; Arvidsson, L.; Jorgensen, PM; James, PW (1986). "New Depsidones from the Lichen Genus Erioderma". Australian Journal of Chemistry. 39 (4): 719. doi:10.1071/CH9860719.
- James, P. W.; White, F. Joy (1987). "Studies on the Genus Nephroma I. The European and Macaronesian Species". The Lichenologist. 19 (3): 215–268. doi:10.1017/S0024282987000239.
- Elix, JA; Gaul, KL; James, PW; Purvis, OW (1987). "Three New Lichen Depsidones". Australian Journal of Chemistry. 40 (2): 417. doi:10.1071/CH9870417.
- White, F. Joy; James, P. W. (1988). "Studies on the Genus Nephroma II. The Southern Temperate Species". The Lichenologist. 20 (2): 103–166. doi:10.1017/S0024282988000167.
- Purvis, O. William; Tittley, I.; Chimonides, P. D. Jim; Bamber, Roger; Hayes, Peta A.; James, Peter W.; Rumsey, Fred J.; Read, Helen (2010). "Long-term biomonitoring of lichen and bryophyte biodiversity at Burnham Beeches SAC and global environmental change". Systematics and Biodiversity. 8 (2): 193–208. doi:10.1080/14772001003782088.
- Kantvilas, Gintaras; Elix, John A.; James, Peter W. (1992). "Siphulella, a New Lichen Genus from Southwest Tasmania". The Bryologist. 95 (2): 186–191. doi:10.2307/3243434. JSTOR 3243434.
- Jørgensen, Per M.; James, Peter W.; Jarvis, Charles E. (1994). "Linnaean lichen names and their typification". Botanical Journal of the Linnean Society. 115 (4): 261–405. doi:10.1111/j.1095-8339.1994.tb01784.x. (over 75 citations)
- Orange, Alan; James, P. W.; White, F. J. (2001). Microchemical Methods for the Identification of Lichens. British Lichen Society. ISBN 9780954041809. (over 1790 citations)
- Wolseley, Patricia A.; James, Peter W.; Theobald, Mark R.; Sutton, Mark A. (2006). "Detecting changes in epiphytic lichen communities at sites affected by atmospheric ammonia from agricultural sources". The Lichenologist. 38 (2): 161–176. doi:10.1017/S0024282905005487. (over 125 citations)
- Davies, L.; Bates, J.W.; Bell, J.N.B.; James, P.W.; Purvis, O.W. (2007). "Diversity and sensitivity of epiphytes to oxides of nitrogen in London". Environmental Pollution. 146 (2): 299–310. doi:10.1016/j.envpol.2006.03.023. PMID 16777294.
- Larsen, R.S.; Bell, J.N.B.; James, P.W.; Chimonides, P.J.; Rumsey, F.J.; Tremper, A.; Purvis, O.W. (2007). "Lichen and bryophyte distribution on oak in London in relation to air pollution and bark acidity". Environmental Pollution. 146 (2): 332–340. doi:10.1016/j.envpol.2006.03.033. PMID 16777299. (over 160 citations)

== Awards and honours ==
Several general and species have been named after James. These include the genus Japewia (James, Peter Wilfrid) in 1990, Jamesiella in 2005 and Peterjamesia in 2006 for his 75th birthday.

== See also ==
- Category:Taxa named by Peter Wilfred James
