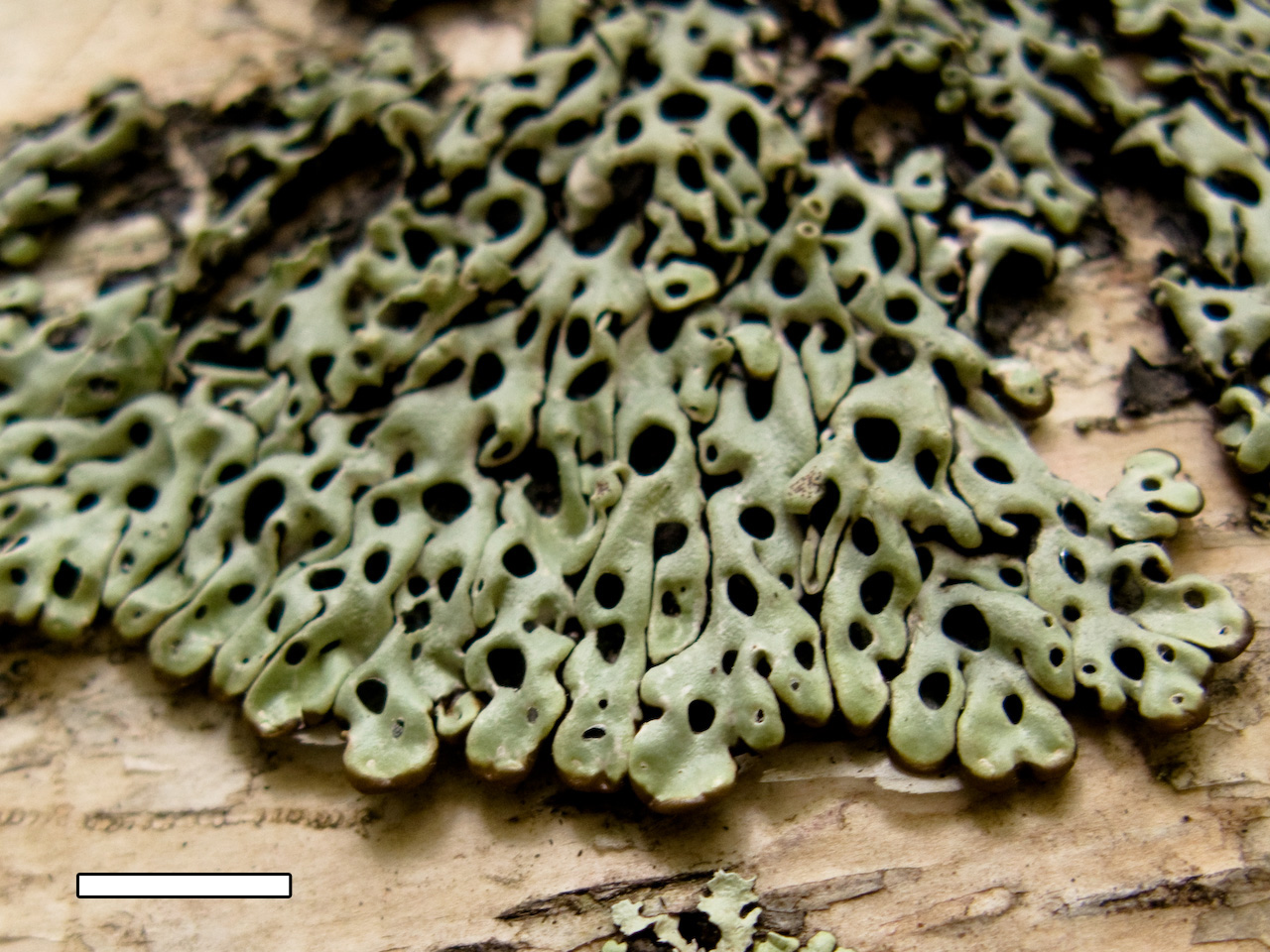
- Menegazzia pertransita growing on a tree near Arthur's Pass, New Zealand. Scale bar = 1 cm.

Scientific classification
- Kingdom: Fungi
- Division: Ascomycota
- Class: Lecanoromycetes
- Order: Lecanorales
- Family: Parmeliaceae
- Genus: Menegazzia; A.Massal. (1854)

Type species
- Menegazzia terebrata A.Massal. (1854)

Subgenera
- Dispora R.Sant. (1942); Octospora R.Sant. (1942); Megamenegazzia Bjerke & Sipman (2007)

= Menegazzia =

Genus of fungi

Menegazzia is a genus of lichenized fungi containing roughly 70 accepted species. The group is sometimes referred to as the tree flutes, honeycombed lichens, or hole-punch lichens. The most obvious morphological feature of the genus is the distinctive perforations spread across the upper side of the thallus. This makes the group easy to recognise, even for those not particularly familiar with lichen identification.

The genus has a sub-cosmopolitan distribution (excluding Antarctica), but is concentrated in Australasia, Melanesia, and southern South America. Most species grow exclusively on trees, but some grow on rocks, moss, and/or soil.

== Etymology ==
Menegazzia was described by the Veronese lichenologist Abramo Massalongo in 1854. He named it after his friend Luigi Menegazzi (1795-1854), who was a naturalist.

== Taxonomy ==
Placement of Menegazzia within the Parmeliaceae has now been confirmed by several molecular studies. However, the exact position of the genus within the Parmeliaceae remains uncertain. It is unplaced within the Parmeliaceae. Previously, the morphologically similar genus Hypogymnia was thought to be the sister genus to Menegazzia, with some authors even separating these two genera into a family of their own, the Hypogymniaceae. However, no molecular phylogenies to date have supported this grouping.

There are three accepted subgenera within Menegazzia: Dispora, Octospora, and Megamenegazzia. However, the monophyletic nature of these three groups remains unknown.

== Characteristics ==
=== Thallus ===
The thallus of Menegazzia is its most distinctive feature. It is foliose, dorsiventral, lobate, and often rosette-forming, though many species can also be irregularly spreading. It is heteromerous, that is, it contains an upper cortex, medulla, green algal layer (occupied by Trebouxia spp.), and lower cortex. The thallus can be loosely or closely attached to the substrate, depending on the species. Lobes are generally hollow and inflated, with perforations throughout the corticate upper surface. Only two species of Menegazzia are known which do not contain perforations (M. eperforata, and an as yet undescribed taxon from Papua New Guinea). Many species can be sorediate, but only a few isidiate. Maculae are often present, especially at the lobe tips. The lower surface is also corticate, naked, and often uniformly attached to the substrate (except in M. inflata). This surface is always blackened, and without rhizines. Internal cavities have walls which are most often white, but in some species they can be pigmented or blackened.

=== Apothecia ===
Rounded apothecia are produced along the lamina of most of the known Menegazzia species, while the others are thought to be entirely asexual (like M. nothofagi and M. globulifera). In the taxa that do produce apothecia, they are always lecanorine, and often cupuliform. They can be sessile, but more frequently are subpedicellate to pedicellate. The apothecial disc is concave to plane, matt to shining, or even pruinose in some taxa (like with M. dielsii), with a well-developed thalline exciple. Epithecium is pigmented, and occasionally has granular inclusions. The hymenium is always colourless. Hypothecium is chondroid, and made-up of thick-walled, conglutinated cells. Paraphyses are netted, with apical cells that are sometimes capitate, and often pigmented to some extent. Asci are 2 or 8-spored.

=== Spores ===
The ascospores are simple, colourless, ellipsoid, thick walled, with a broad range of dimensions: 20-120 × 10-50 μm. Pycnidia, if present, are produced along the lamina, and minute, immersed, and punctiform with a dark apex. Conidia, if present, are short and bacilliform.

=== Chemistry ===
Members of the genus have a diverse chemistry, including fatty acids, depsides, depsidones, and pigments.

== Ecology ==
Menegazzia species are most often corticolous, but several species are saxicolous, muscicolous, and/or terricolous. This group tends to be most abundant and diverse in Australasia and South America, commonly found in forests where southern beech (Nothofagus) dominates. They favour higher-elevation, moist, cool habitats. Most species appear to be very slow growing, especially in dryer habitats, but more study is needed here.

== Evolution ==
Ascus evolution in Menegazzia is of particular interest, because many species have 2-spores per ascus, while nearly all other genera in the Parmeliaceae have 8-spores (making the character likely plesiomorphic for the family).

== Uses ==
Menegazzia does not produce any economically important products, nor is it known to have had any uses by indigenous peoples. However, the genus is important for some small insects, which use the hollow lobes for shelter and the upper cortex for food.

== Image gallery ==
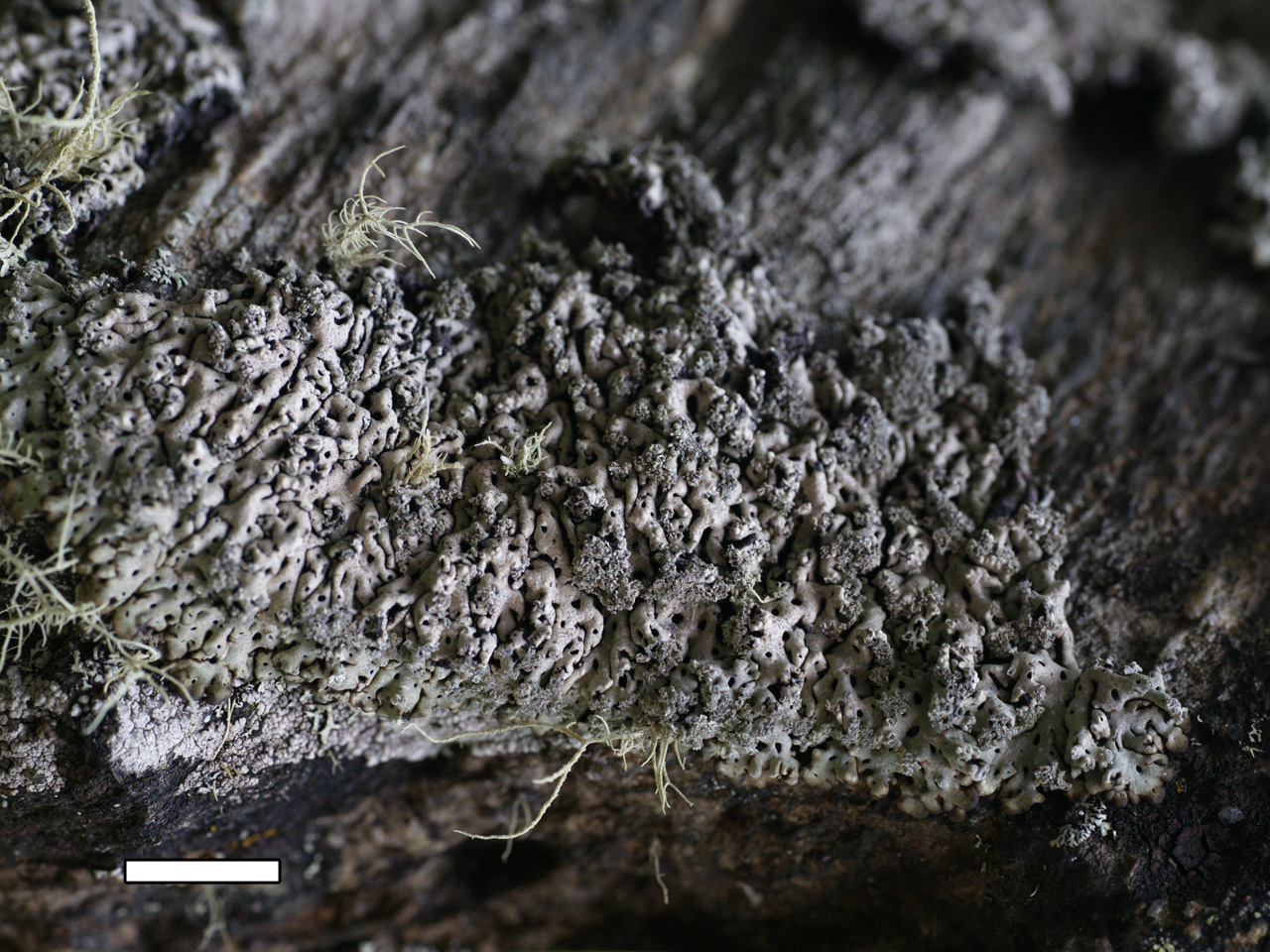
Menegazzia castanea on a rock outcrop. Rock and Pillar Range, New Zealand. Scale bar = 1 cm.

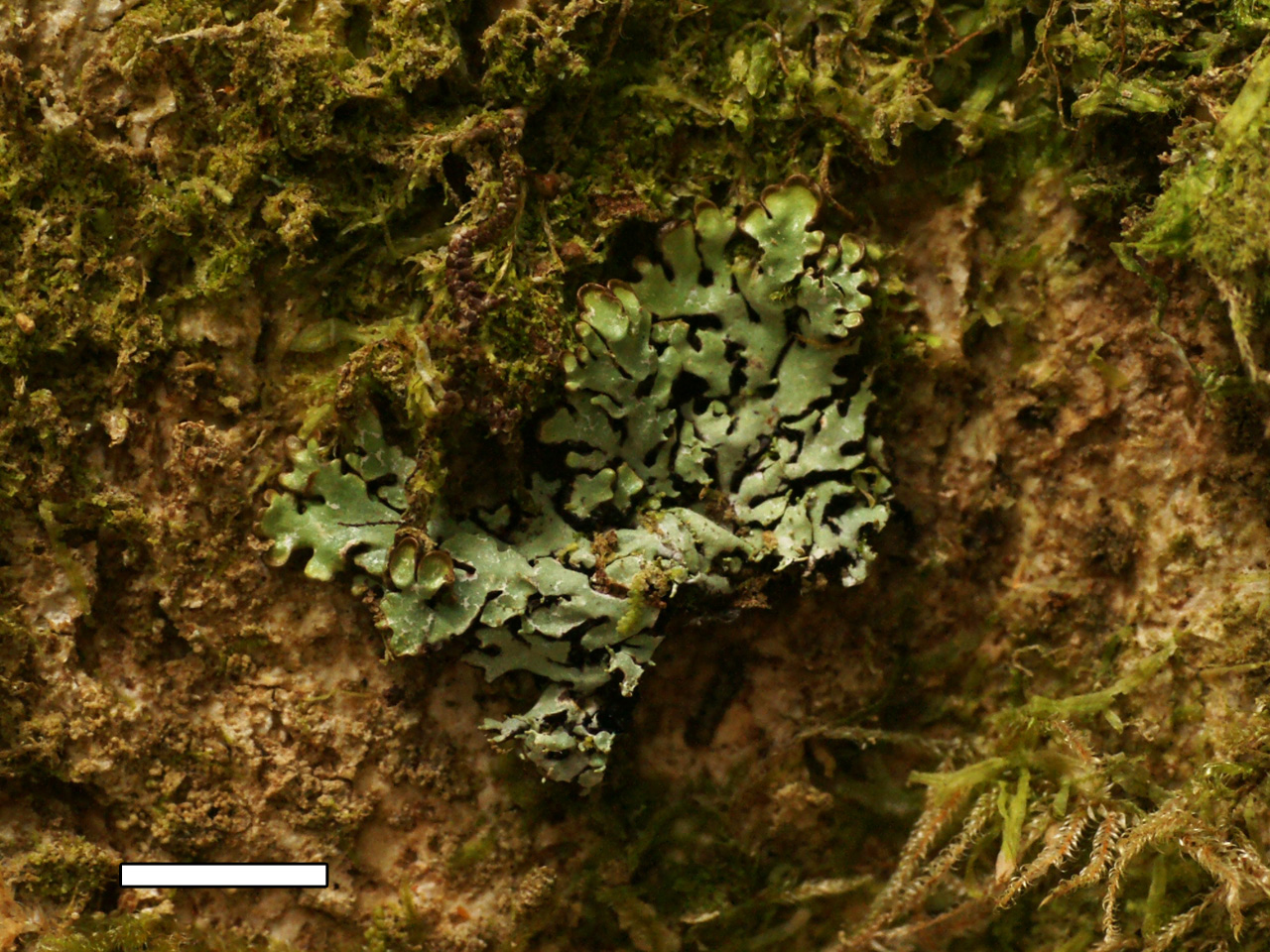
Menegazzia eperforata, on a tree in Mt. Bruce, New Zealand. Scale bar = 1 cm.

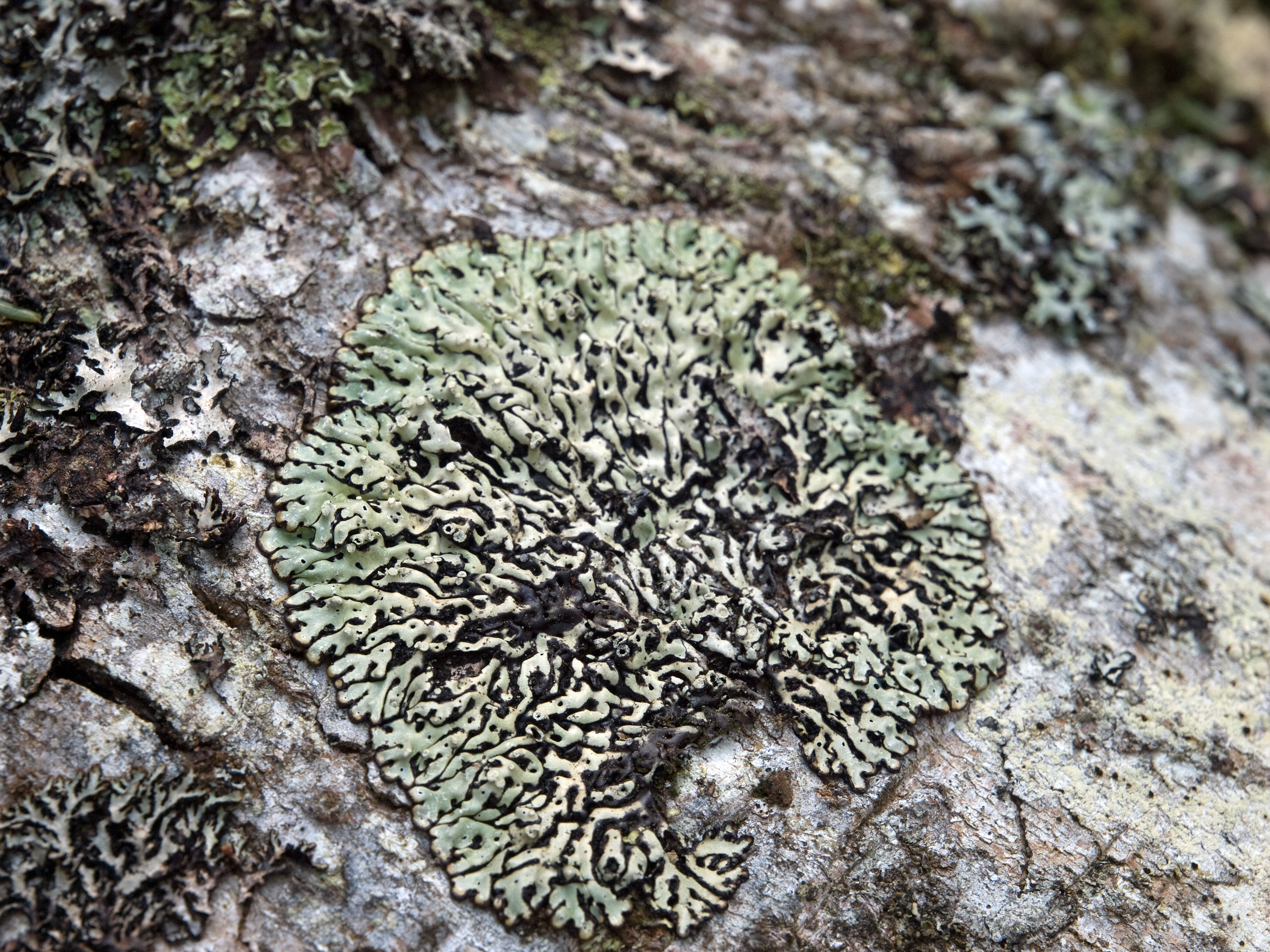
Menegazzia terebrata, photographed in Bavaria.

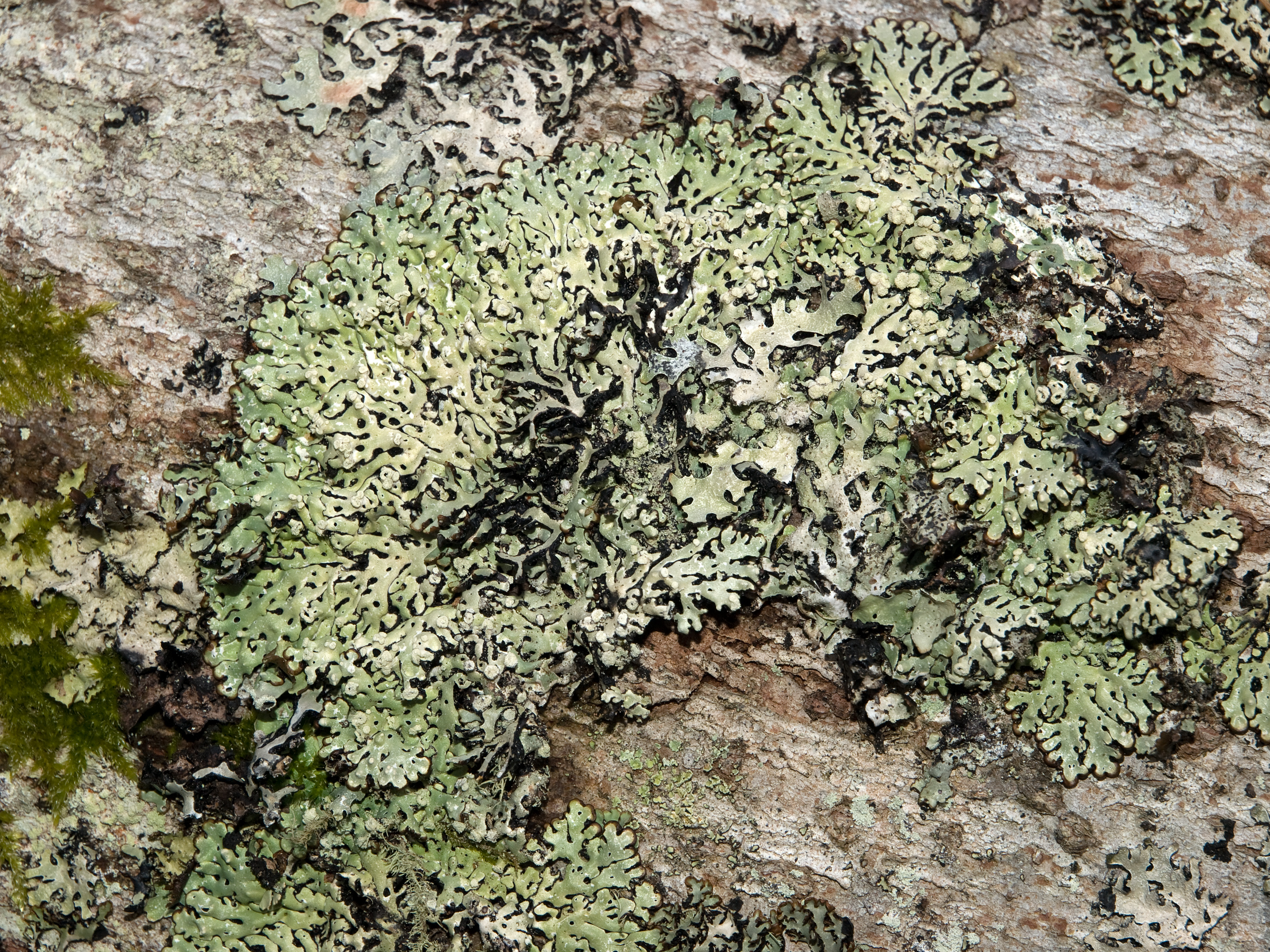
Menegazzia terebrata, photographed in Bavaria.

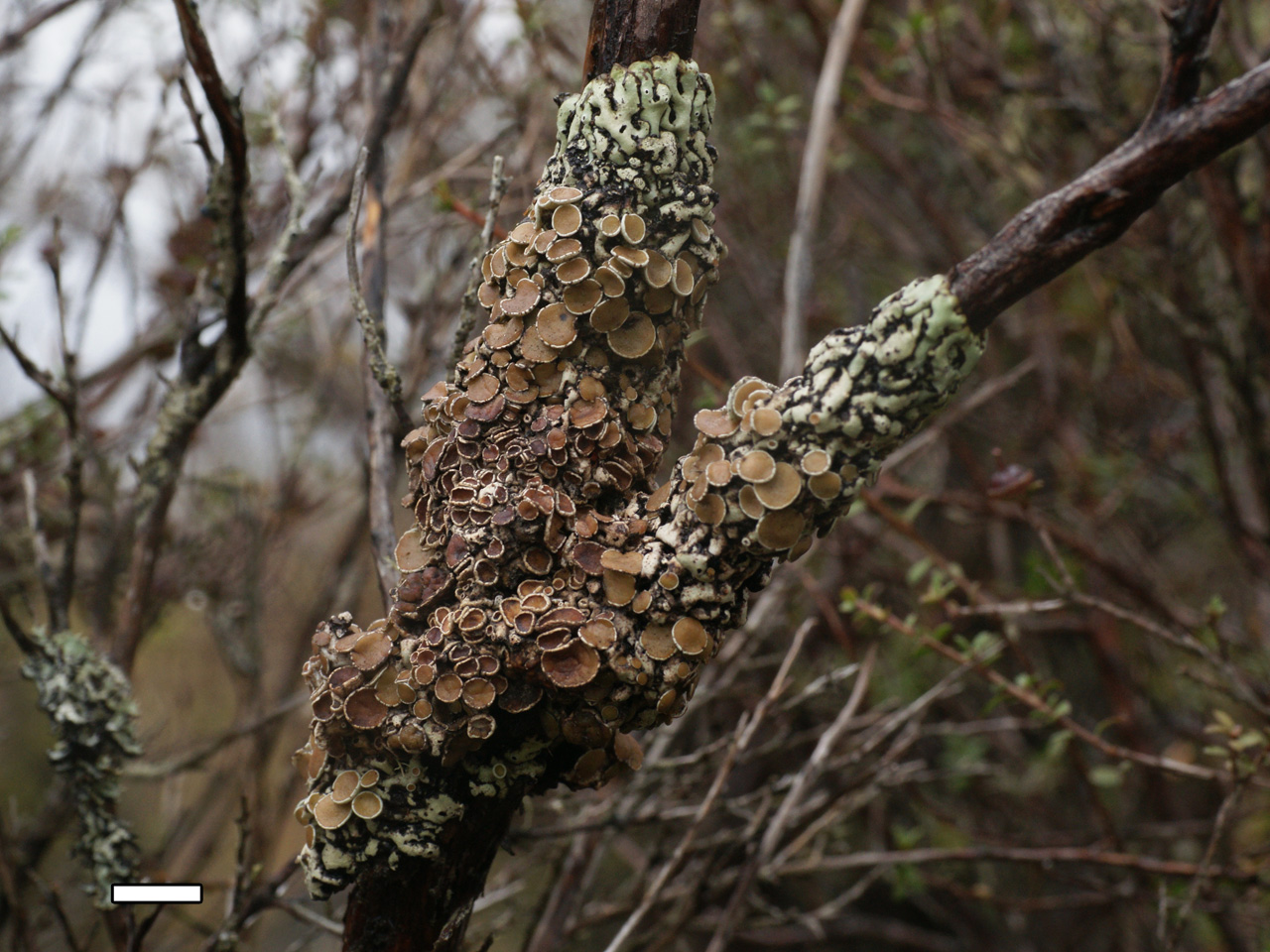
Menegazzia testacea, on a small tree in the Rangipo Desert, New Zealand. Scale bar = 1 cm.
