= Robin's plantain =

Robin's plantain or poor Robin's plantain is a common name for several plants native to eastern North America and may refer to:

- Erigeron pulchellus in the family Asteraceae. E. pulchellus has white or pink flowers.
- Erigeron philadelphicus, also in the family Asteraceae.
- Hieracium venosum in the family Asteraceae. H. venosum has yellow flowers.
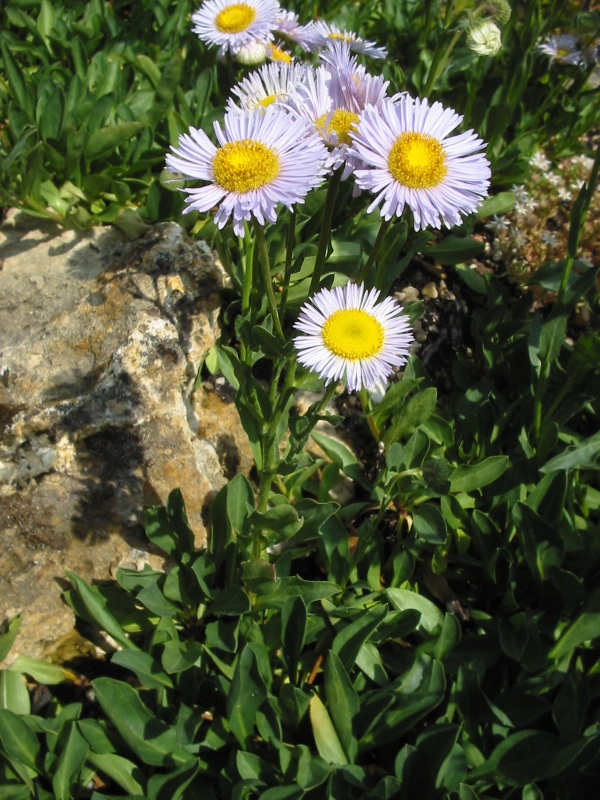
Erigeron pulchellus

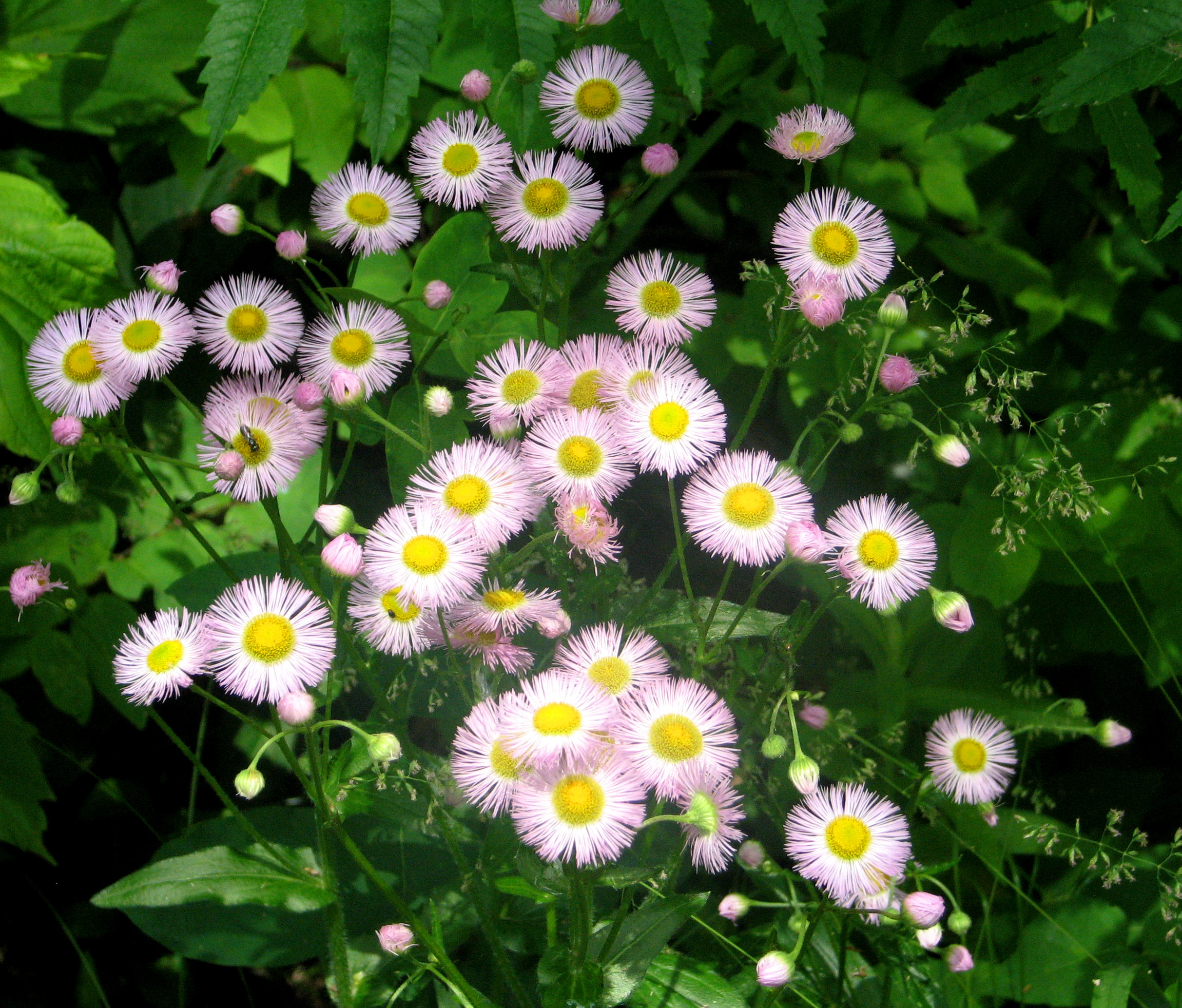
Erigeron philadelphicus

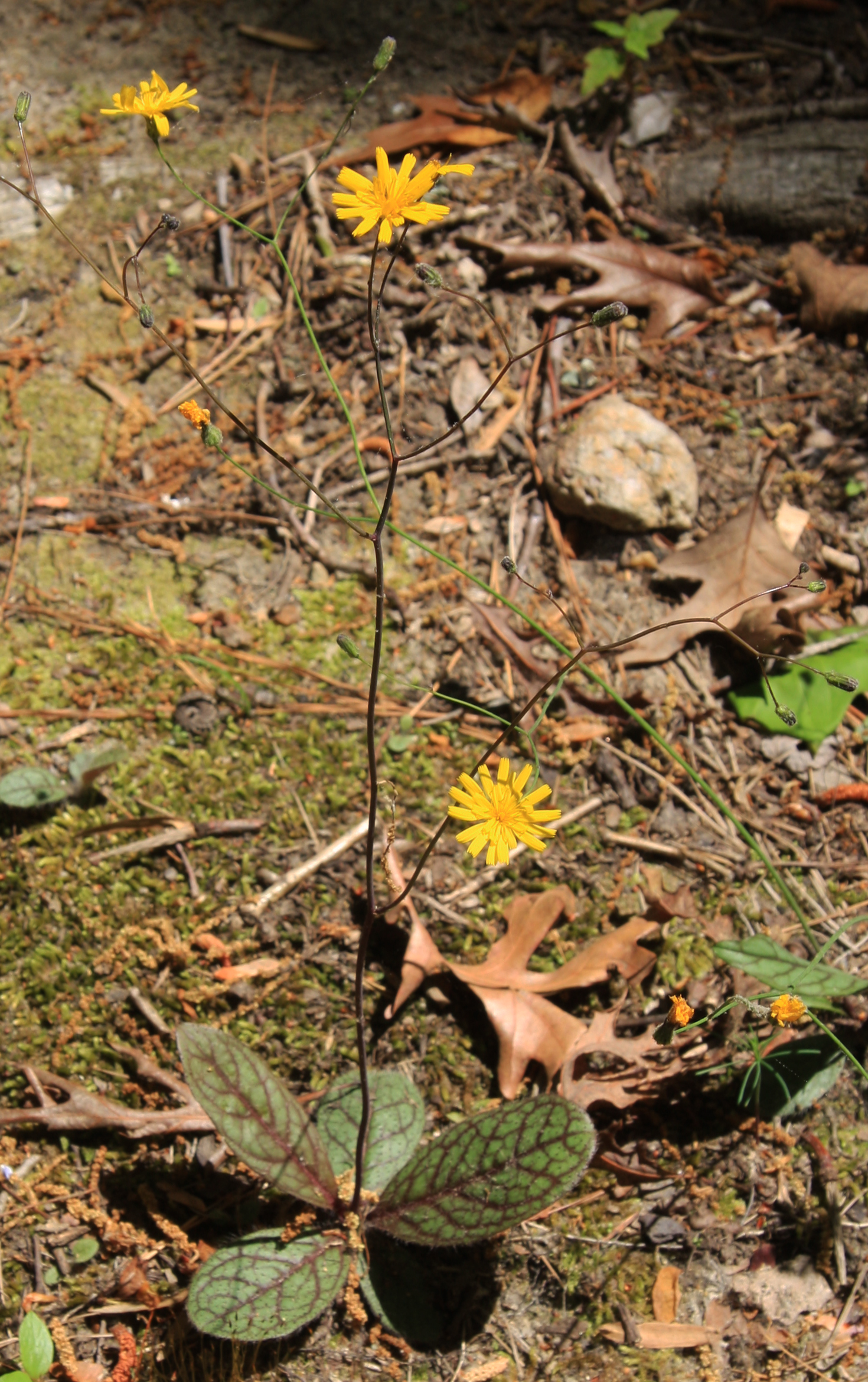
Hieracium venosum
