= Caloplaca haematites =

Scientific classification
- Kingdom: Fungi
- Division: Ascomycota
- Class: Lecanoromycetes
- Order: Teloschistales
- Family: Teloschistaceae
- Genus: Caloplaca
- Species: C. haematites

Binomial name
- Caloplaca haematites (Chaub. ex St.-Amans) Zwackh (1862)

Synonyms
- List: Blastenia haematites (Chaub. ex St.-Amans) B.de Lesd.; Callopisma haematites (Chaub. ex St.-Amans) A.Massal.; Callopisma haematites (Chaub.); Caloplaca cerina var. haematites (Chaub. ex St.-Amans) H.Olivier; Lecanora haematites Chaub.; Lecanora haematites Chaub. ex St.-Amans; Lecidea cerina f. haematites (Chaub. ex St.-Amans) Hue; Lecidea cerina var. haematites (Chaub. ex St.-Amans) Schaer.; Parmelia cerina var. haematites (Chaub. ex St.-Amans) Fr.; Placodium haematites (Chaub. ex St.-Amans) A.L.Sm.; Placodium haematites (Chaub. ex St.-Amans) Anzi

Species of lichen

Caloplaca haematites is a species of lichen belonging to the family Teloschistaceae. It has mainly been reported from Europe but is also found in other parts of the world. It was reported in the UK media in 2011 because it was thought to have been extinct in Britain, but was rediscovered after 122 years.

Caloplaca haematites grows as an epiphyte on trees. A study on Kos Island reported Caloplaca haematites from the trunks of Melia azedarach and Robinia pseudacacia trees where it grows along other the other lichens Catillaria nigroclavata, Rinodina colobina and Rinodina exigua.

== Description ==
Caloplaca haematites is a crustose lichen characterised by its distinctive ash-grey to dark blue-grey thallus (the main body of the lichen). The thallus appears as a continuous layer that may be smooth, wrinkled, or divided into small, convex sections called areolae. A distinct feature is its indigo-blue hypothallus, which is the underlying layer of fungal tissue. When tested with potassium hydroxide solution (the K spot test), the thallus shows a faint purple reaction, which helps in chemical identification.

The reproductive structures, called apothecia, are typically abundant and clustered toward the centre of the thallus. These apothecia can reach up to 0.75 mm in diameter and develop from a concave shape to a flat surface. They are distinctively deep blood-red or rust-red in colour. Each apothecium has a proper margin (inner edge) that matches the colour of the disc, and a persistent blue-grey thalline margin (outer edge) with a smooth, entire border.

The internal reproductive layer (hymenium) measures 80 micrometre (μm) in height. Within this layer are paraphyses—sterile filaments that rarely branch and are barely club-shaped but have cap-like ends, with the terminal cell measuring 3–4 μm thick. The spore-producing sacs (asci) are oblong and club-shaped, measuring 70–75 by 10–12 μm. The spores themselves are broadly ellipsoid, measuring 11–18 by 6–11 μm, with a dividing wall (septum) that spans between one-third to one-half of the spore's length.

== See also ==
- List of Caloplaca species
