= List of Rinodina species =

Rinodina is a large genus of lichens in the family Physciaceae. As of July 2022, Index Fungorum lists 132 species in the genus but the Global Biodiversity Information Facility lists 275 species. This list is based on the 132 found in the Index Fungorum. So many potential species are omitted.

== A ==
- Rinodina aequata (Ach.) Flagey
- Rinodina alba Metzler ex Arnold
- Rinodina albertana Sheard
- Rinodina almbornii H.Mayrhofer (1984)
- Rinodina argopsina Elix & P.M.McCarthy
- Rinodina arnoldii H.Mayrhofer & Poelt
- Rinodina arthomelina U.Grube, H.Mayrhofer & Elix
- Rinodina ascociscana (Tuck.) Tuck. (1872)
- Rinodina asperata (Shirley) Kantvilas
- Rinodina aspersa (Borrer) J.R.Laundon
- Rinodina atrocinerea (Fr.) Körb.
- Rinodina atrofuscata (Vain.) Aptroot
- Rinodina aurantiaca Sheard
- Rinodina australiensis Müll.Arg.
- Rinodina austroborealis Sheard
- Rinodina austroleprosa Elix

== B ==
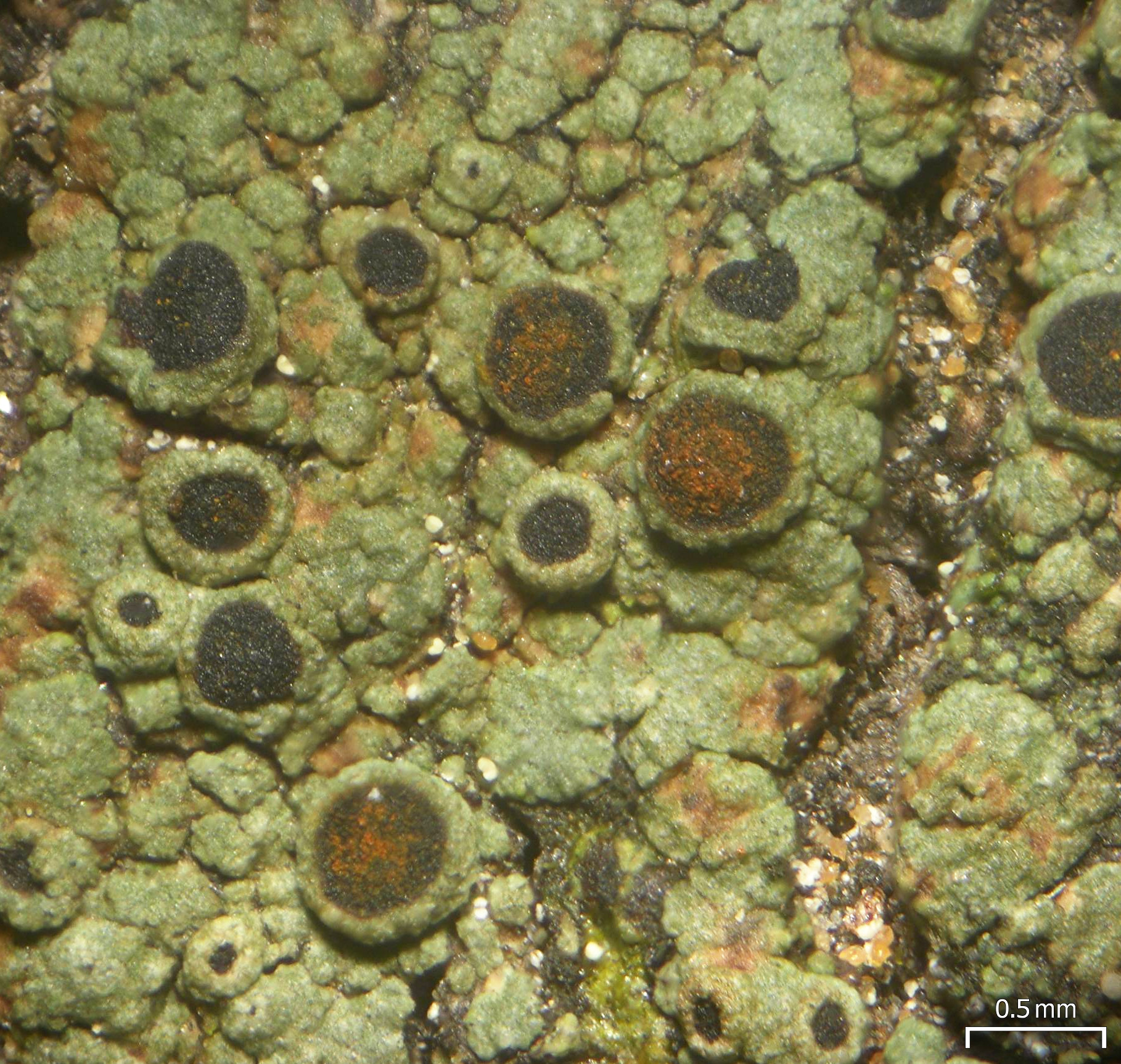
Rinodina badiexcipula

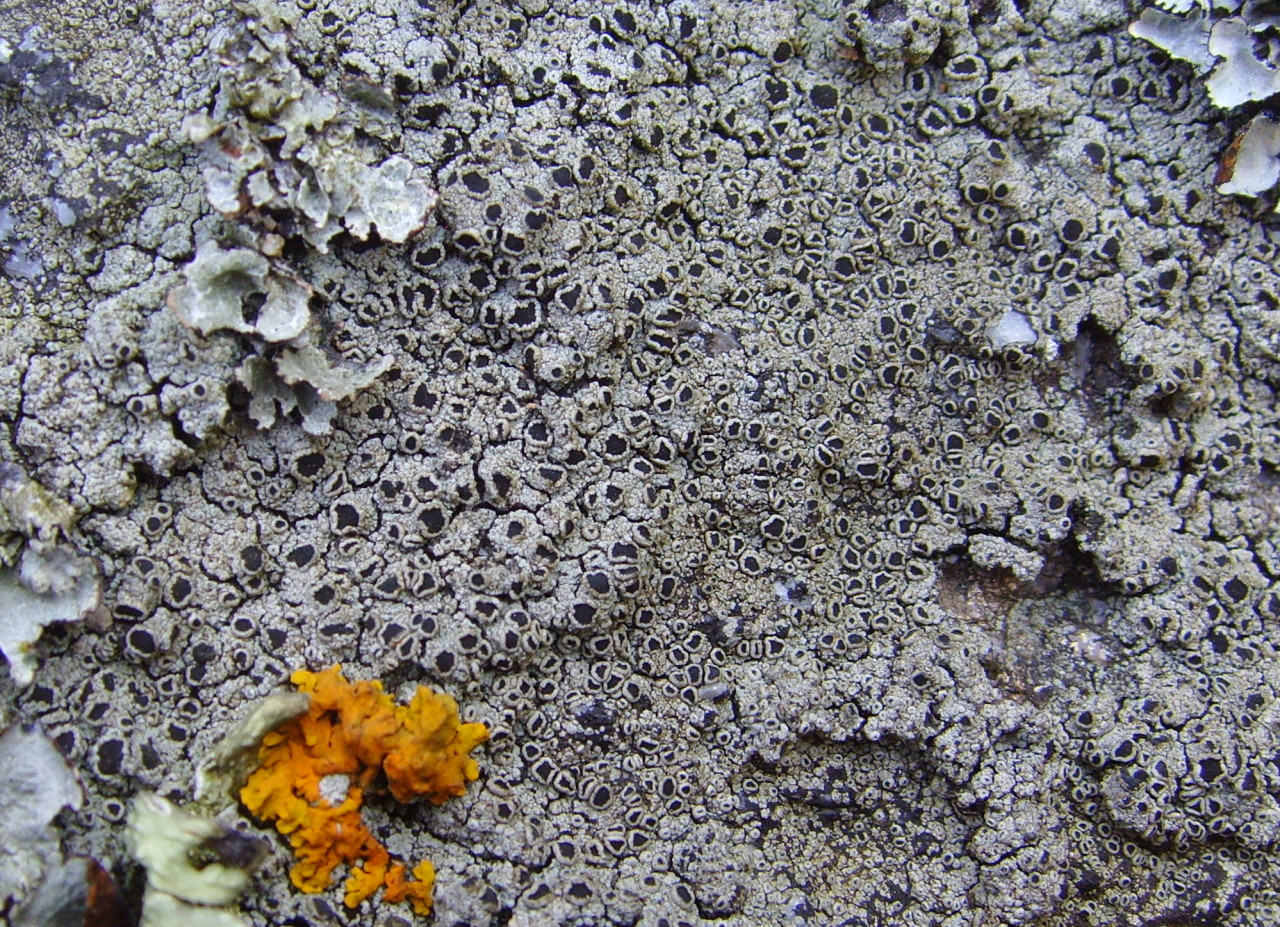
Rinodina beccariana

- Rinodina badiexcipula Sheard
- Rinodina beccariana Bagl.
- Rinodina biloculata (Nyl.) Sheard
- Rinodina bischoffii (Hepp) A. Massal.
- Rinodina blastidiata Matzer & H. Mayrhofer
- Rinodina boulderensis Sheard
- Rinodina brasiliensis Giralt, Kalb & H. Mayrhofer
- Rinodina brattii H. Mayrhofer
- Rinodina brauniana Lendemer & Sheard
- Rinodina brodoana Sheard, Lendemer & E.A. Tripp
- Rinodina buckii Sheard
- Rinodina bullata Sheard & Lendemer

== C ==
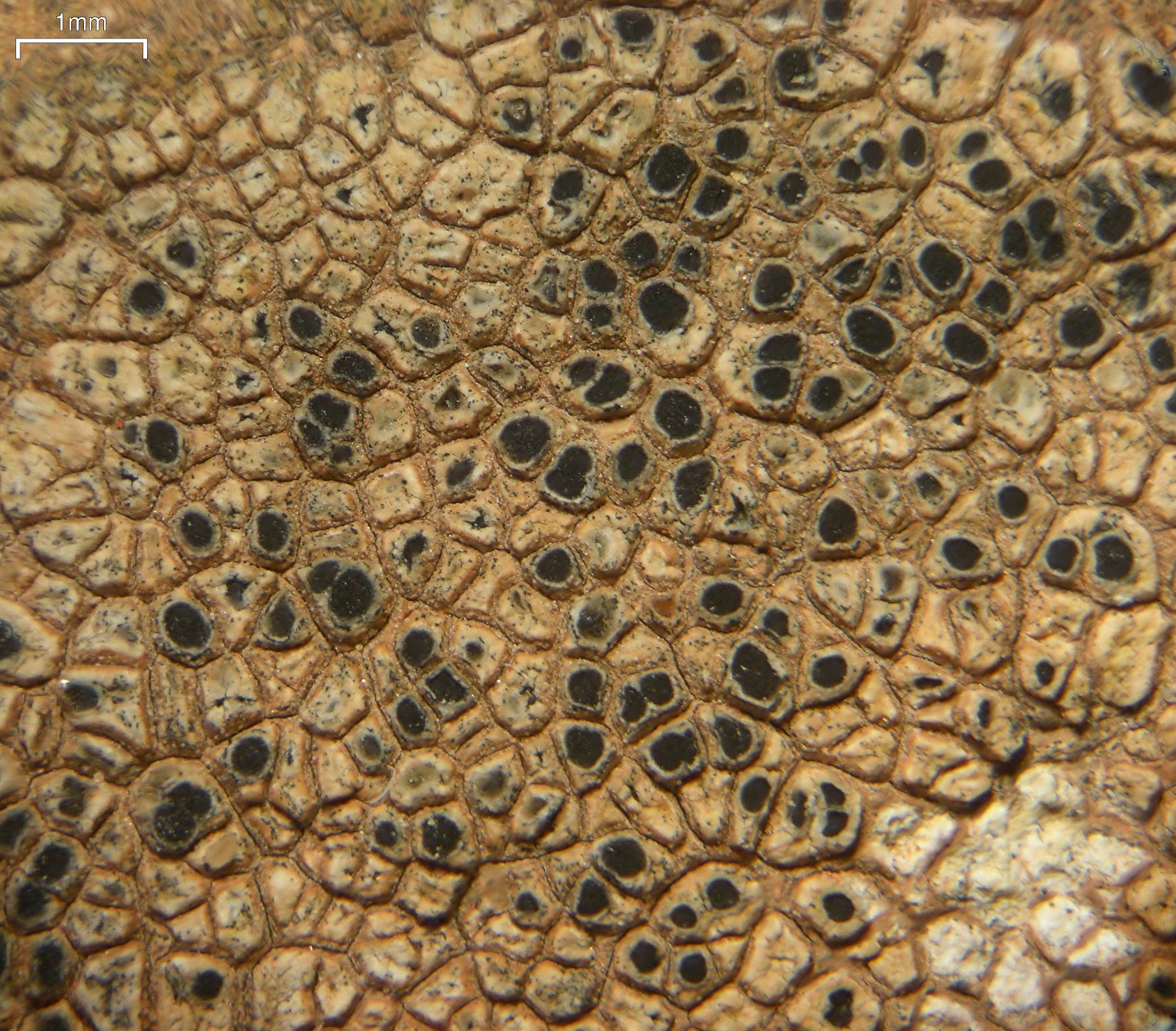
Rinodina castanomela

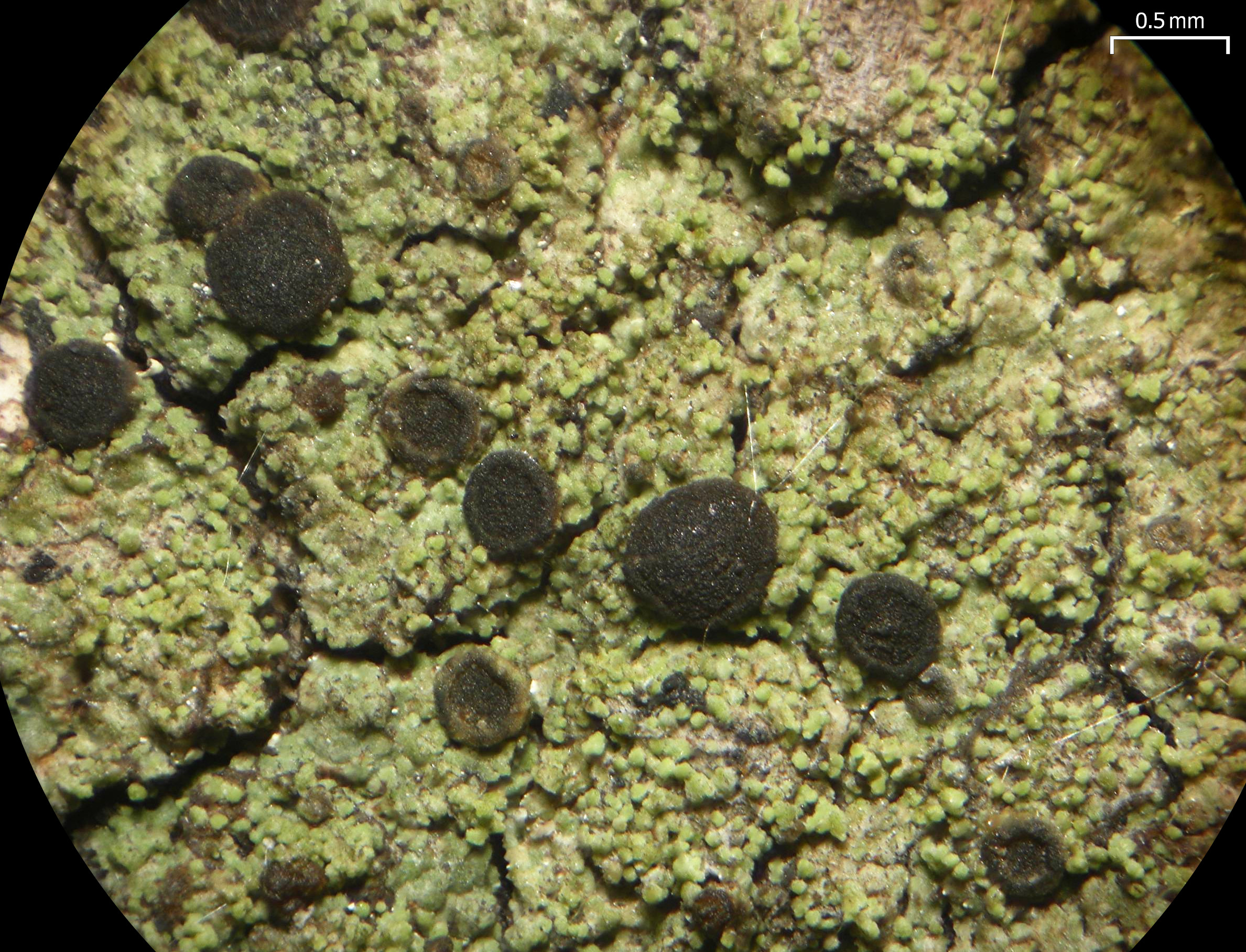
Rinodina colobinoides

- Rinodina calcarea (Hepp ex Arnold) Arnold
- Rinodina californiensis Sheard
- Rinodina campestris Sheard & C.A. Morse
- Rinodina candidogrisea Hafellner, Muggia & Obermayer
- Rinodina capeverdeana Giralt & van den Boom
- Rinodina chrysidiata Sheard
- Rinodina citrinisidiata Aptroot & Wolseley
- Rinodina colobina (Ach.) Th.Fr.
- Rinodina colobinoides (Nyl.) Müll. Arg.
- Rinodina compensata (Nyl.) Zahlbr.
- Rinodina confragosa (Ach.) Körb.
- Rinodina confragosula (Nyl.) Müll. Arg.
- Rinodina confusa H. Mayrhofer & Kantvilas
- Rinodina conradii Körb.
- Rinodina cryptolecanorina Bungartz & Giralt

== D ==
- Rinodina degeliana Coppins
- Rinodina densisidiata Kalb & Aptroot
- Rinodina diminutiva Giralt & Elix
- Rinodina dolichospora Malme

== E ==
- Rinodina efflorescens Malme
- Rinodina elixii H. Mayrhofer, Kantvilas & Ropin
- Rinodina endospora Sheard
- Rinodina ericina (Nyl.) Giralt
- Rinodina etayoi Giralt & van den Boom
- Rinodina evae Fos & Giralt
- Rinodina exigua (Ach.) Gray

== F ==
- Rinodina fijiensis Elix & Giralt
- Rinodina filsonii H. Mayrhofer
- Rinodina fimbriata Körb.
- Rinodina flavosoralifera Tønsberg
- Rinodina freyi H.Magn. (1947)
- Rinodina fuscoisidiata Giralt, Kalb & Elix

== G ==
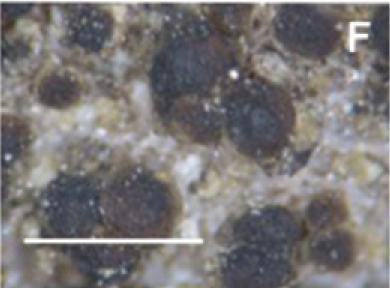
Rinodina gennarii

- Rinodina galapagoensis Giralt & Bungartz
- Rinodina gennarii Bagl.
- Rinodina graciliforminica Giralt & Elix
- Rinodina grandilocularis Sheard
- Rinodina griseosoralifera Coppins
- Rinodina gustafmalmei Giralt & Sheard
- Rinodina gyrophorica Kaschik

== H ==
- Rinodina herteliana Kaschik
- Rinodina hypobadia Sheard

== I ==
- Rinodina immersa (Körb.) J. Steiner
- Rinodina imshaugii Sheard
- Rinodina incurva Sheard & J. Walton
- Rinodina innata Sheard
- Rinodina inspersoparietata Giralt & van den Boom
- Rinodina interpolata (Stirt.) Sheard
- Rinodina isabelina Giralt & Bungartz
- Rinodina isidioides (Borrer) H. Olivier

== J ==
- Rinodina juniperina Sheard

== K ==
- Rinodina kozukensins (Vain.) Zahlbr.

== L ==
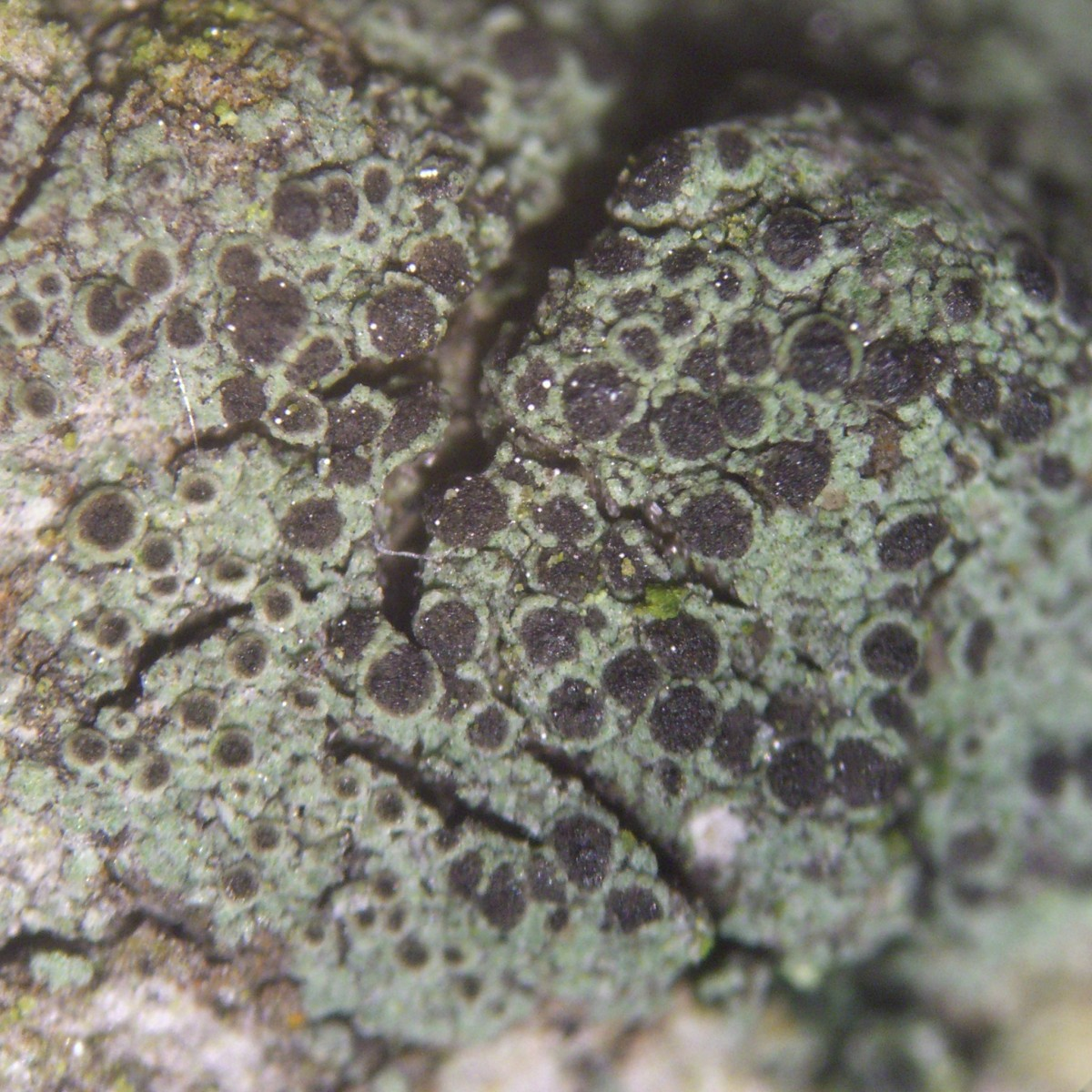
Rinodina laevigata

- Rinodina laevigata (Ach.) Malme
- Rinodina lignicola Sheard
- Rinodina lindingeri (Erichsen) Giralt & van den Boom
- Rinodina lobulata Sheard
- Rinodina luridata Körb.) H. Mayrhofer, Scheid. & Sheard
- Rinodina luridescens (Anzi) Arnold

== M ==
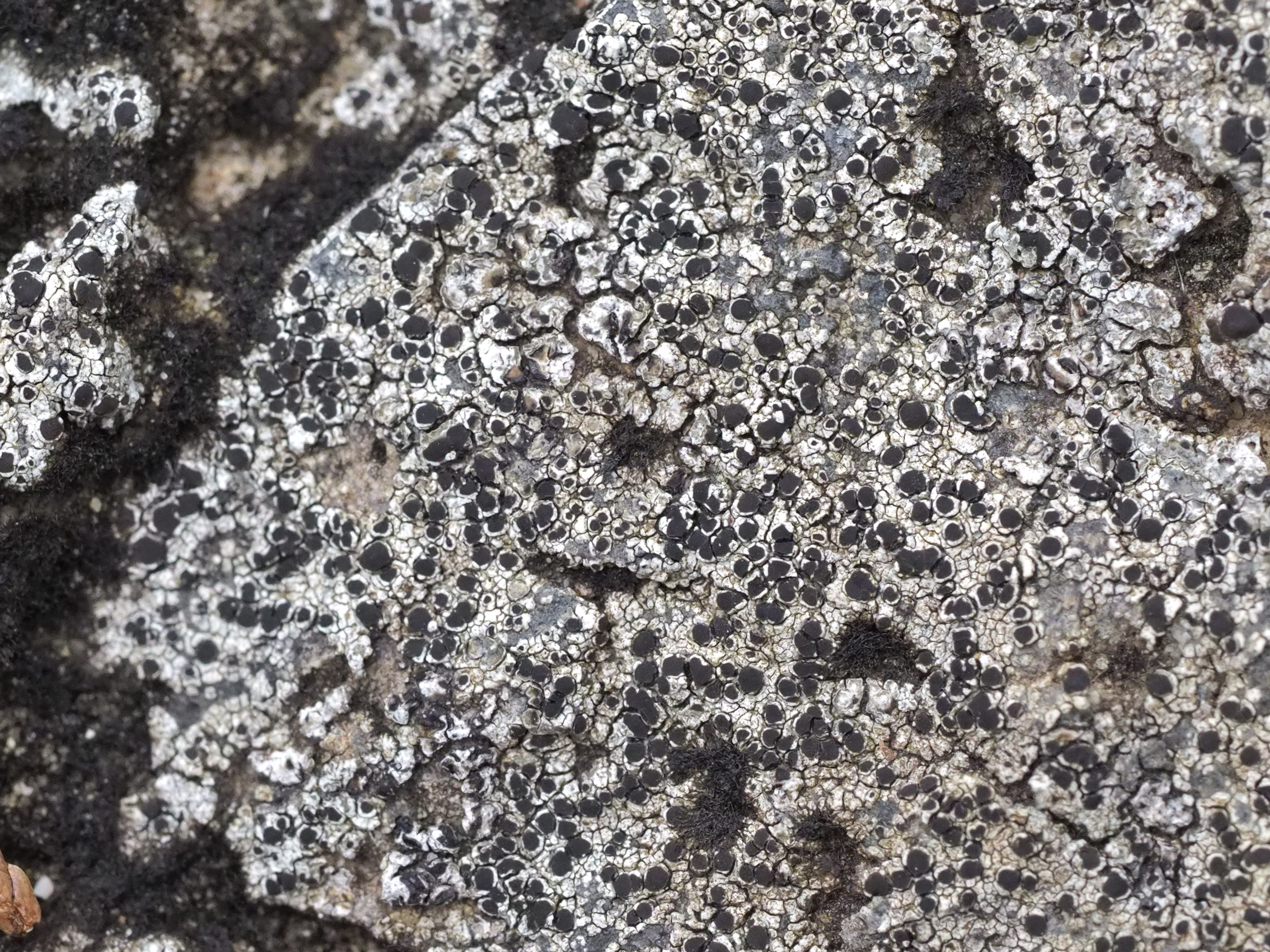
Rinodina moziana

- Rinodina macrospora Sheard
- Rinodina maronisidiata Kalb & Aptroot
- Rinodina megistospora Sheard & H. Mayrhofer
- Rinodina michaelae H. Mayrhofer & Elix
- Rinodina milvina (Wahlenb.) Th. Fr.
- Rinodina milvinodes H. Mayrhofer
- Rinodina mniaroea
- Rinodina moziana (Nyl.) Zahlbr.
- Rinodina murrayi H. Mayrhofer

== N ==
- Rinodina notabilis (Lynge) Sheard
- Rinodina nugrae Giralt & Bungartz

== O ==
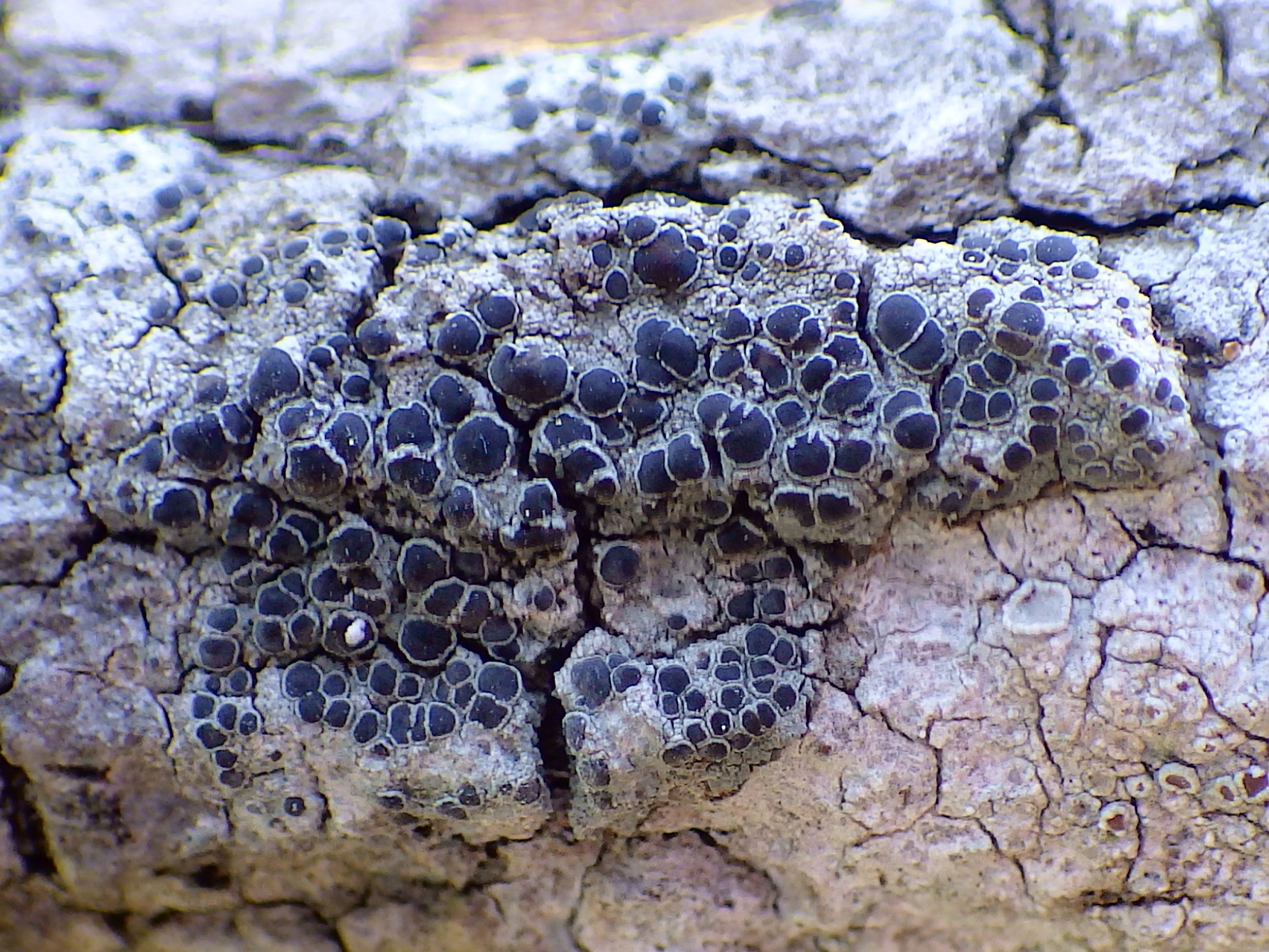
Rinodina olae

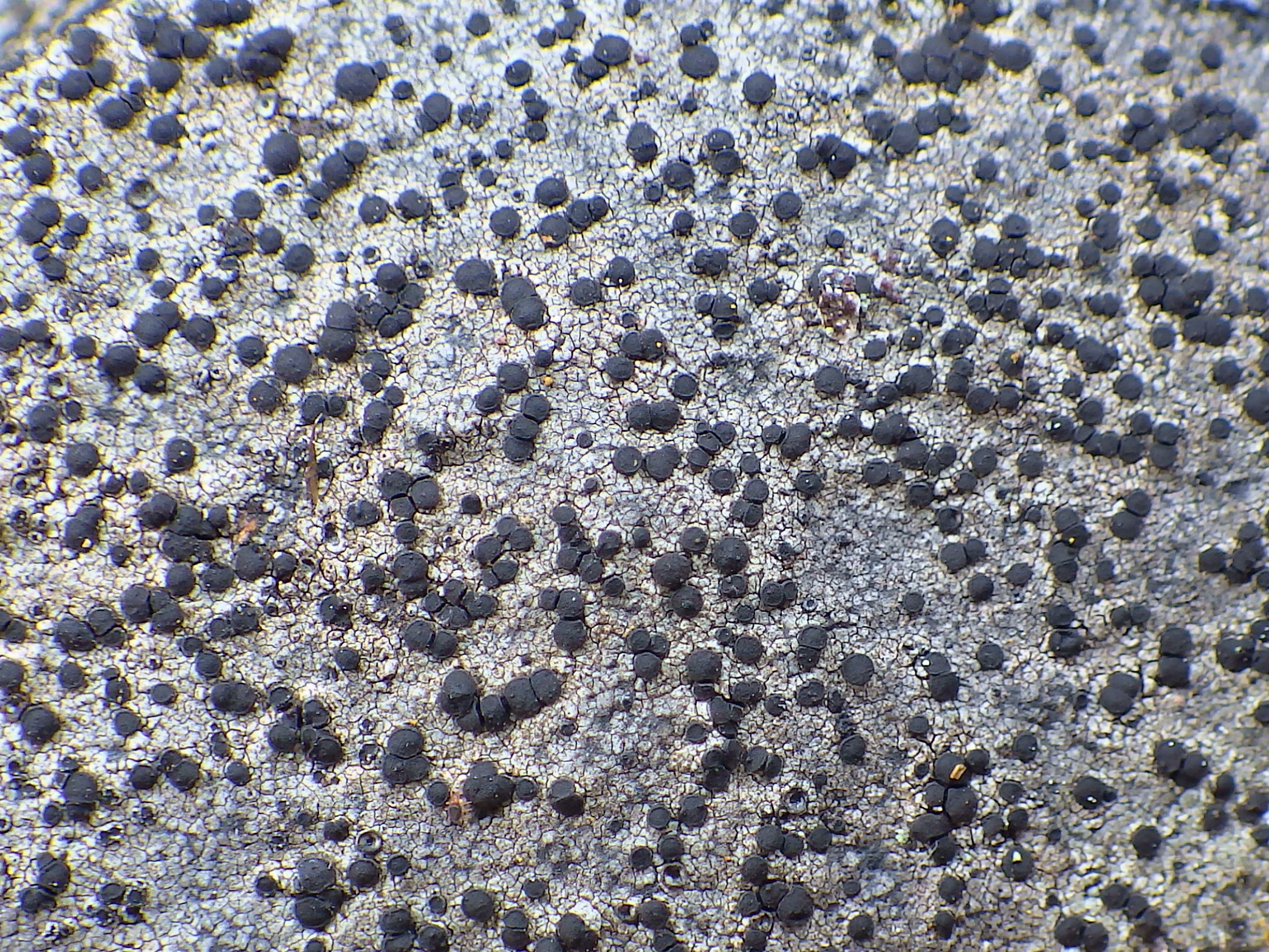
Rinodina oxydata

- Rinodina obscura Müll. Arg.
- Rinodina occulta (Körb.) Sheard
- Rinodina oleae Bagl.
- Rinodina orientalis Sheard
- Rinodina oxneriana S.Y. Kondr., Lőkös & Hur
- Rinodina oxydatella Elix & Giralt

== P ==
- Rinodina pacifica Sheard
- Rinodina pallidescens Sheard & Tønsberg
- Rinodina parasitica H. Mayrhofer & Poelt
- Rinodina peloleuca (Nyl.) Müll. Arg.
- Rinodina perreagens Sheard
- Rinodina pityrea Ropin & H. Mayrhofer
- Rinodina placynthielloides Aptroot
- Rinodina pluriloculata Aptroot & Sparrius
- Rinodina polymorphospora Giralt & van den Boom
- Rinodina polyspora Th. Fr.
- Rinodina punctosorediata Aptroot & Sparrius
- Rinodina pyrina (Ach.) Arnold

== R ==
- Rinodina ramboldii Kaschik
- Rinodina roboris

== S ==
- Rinodina sicula H. Mayrhofer & Poelt
- Rinodina siouxiana Sheard
- Rinodina sophodes (Ach.) A. Massal.
- Rinodina striatitunicata Matzer & H. Mayrhofer
- Rinodina subbadioatra (Müll. Arg.) C.W. Dodge
- Rinodina subcrustacea Müll. Arg.) Zahlbr.
- Rinodina substellulata Müll. Arg.

== T ==
- Rinodina tasmanica H. Mayrhofer
- Rinodina teichophila (Nyl.) Arnold
- Rinodina teniswoodiorum Elix & Kantvilas
- Rinodina terricola Sheard & K. Knudsen
- Rinodina thiomela (Nyl.) Müll. Arg.
- Rinodina tibellii H. Mayrhofer
- Rinodina turfacea (Wahlenb.) Körb.
- Rinodina turfaceoides van den Boom, H. Mayrhofer, Elix & Giralt

== U ==
- Rinodina unica Giralt & Sheard

== V ==
- Rinodina verruciformis Sheard

== W ==
- Rinodina wetmorei Sheard
- Rinodina williamsii H. Mayrhofer

== X ==
- Rinodina xanthomelana Müll. Arg.
