= Emma Lucy Braun =

American botanist and ecologist (1889–1971)

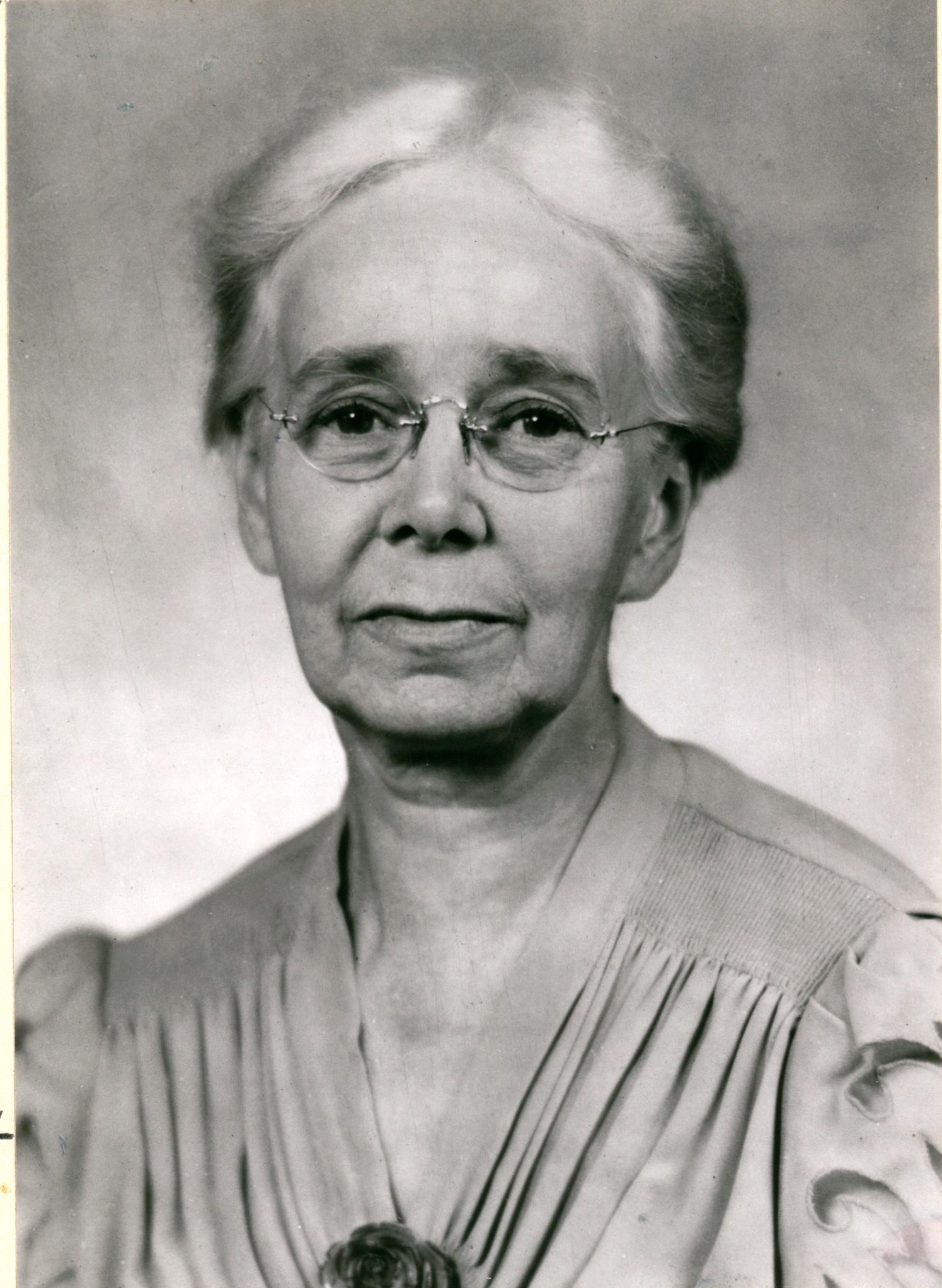
- Born: April 19, 1889; Cincinnati, Ohio
- Died: March 5, 1971 (aged 81); Cincinnati, Ohio
- Resting place: Spring Grove Cemetery
- Education: University of Cincinnati
- Known for: expert on Eastern US forests
- Awards: Mary Soper Pope Memorial Award in Botany; Certificate of Merit of the Botanical Society of America; Ohio Conservation Hall of Fame
- Scientific career
- Fields: botany, ecology
- Workplaces: University of Cincinnati
- Thesis: The Physiographic Ecology of the Cincinnati Region
- Doctoral advisor: Harris M. Benedict
- Other academic advisors: Henry C. Cowles, Nevin M. Fenneman
- Author abbrev. (botany): E.L.Braun

Notes
- Sister: Annette Frances Braun

Emma Lucy Braun (April 19, 1889 – March 5, 1971) was a prominent botanist, ecologist, and expert on the forests of the eastern United States who was a professor of the University of Cincinnati. She was the first woman to be elected President of the Ecological Society of America, in 1950. She was an environmentalist before the term was popularized, and a pioneering woman in her field, winning many awards for her work.

== Life and career ==
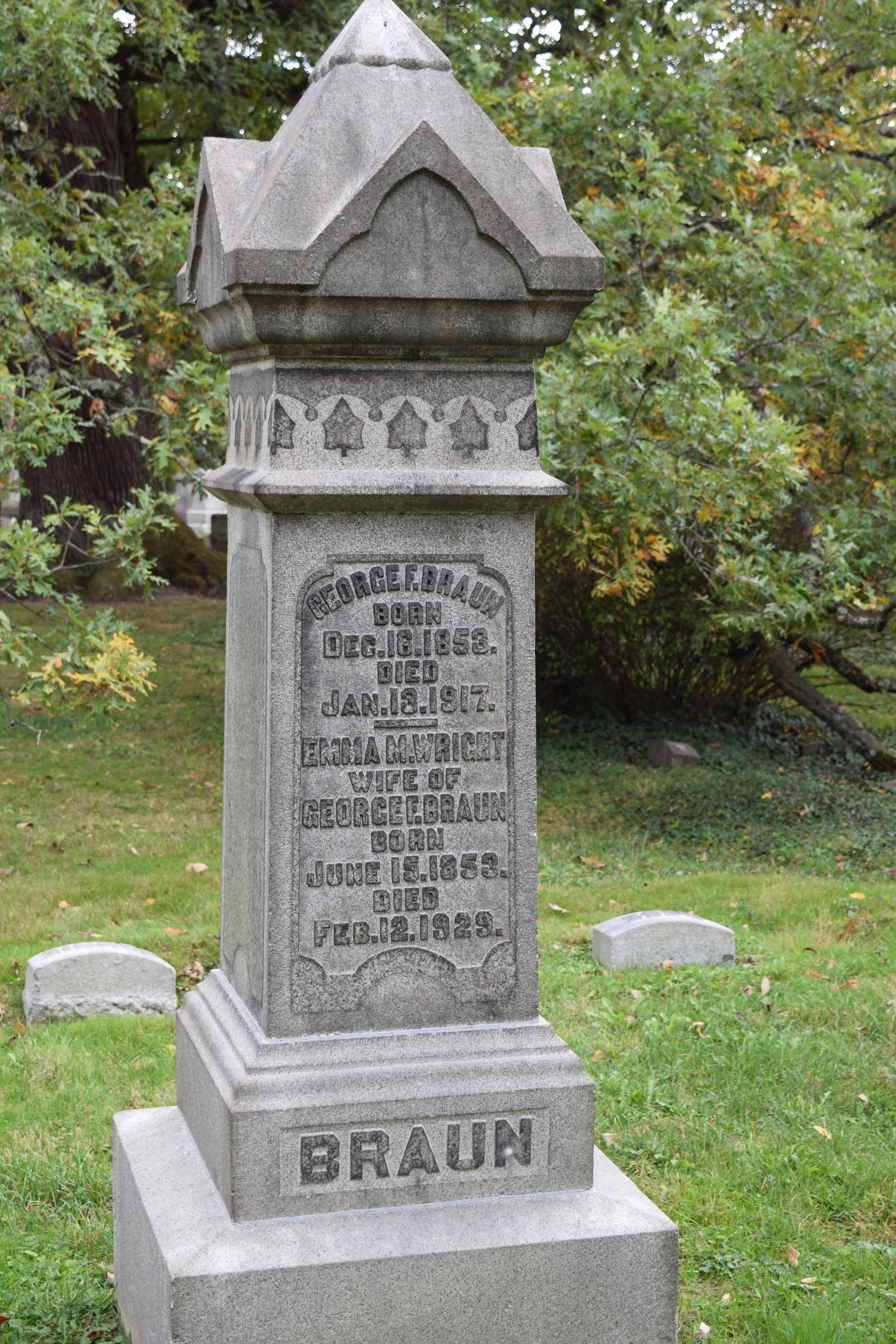
Wright-Braun family monument, Spring Grove Cemetery, Cincinnati, Ohio

Emma Lucy Braun was born on April 19, 1889, in Cincinnati; she lived in Ohio for the remainder of her life. The daughter of George Frederick and Emma Moriah (Wright) Braun, her early interest in the natural world was encouraged by her parents, who took her and her older sister Annette Frances Braun into the woods to identify wildflowers. Braun's mother even had a small herbarium. In high school, Braun herself began collecting plants for study, the beginning of a huge personal herbarium that she assembled over her lifetime, composed of 11,891 specimens. Her collection became a part of the herbarium at the Smithsonian National Museum of Natural History in Washington D.C.

Braun studied botany and geology at the University of Cincinnati. She earned a bachelor's degree in 1910, a master's degree in geology in 1912, and a PhD in botany in 1914. In 1912, she studied with Henry C. Cowles; Harris M. Benedict was her dissertation adviser, with additional advice from Nevin M. Fenneman. She became the sixth woman to earn a PhD from that institution; her sister was the first. Braun's teaching and research career at the University of Cincinnati began as an assistant in geology (1910–1913). She taught as an assistant in botany from 1914 to 1917, then advanced through the titles of instructor, assistant professor, and associate professor. She achieved full professorship as a professor of plant ecology in 1946, two years before her retirement. She held the title of professor emeritus of plant ecology from 1948 until her death in 1971.

Braun was especially active in fieldwork, both during her active professorship as well as in retirement. She traveled over 65,000 miles in 25 years of investigations, most of it driving her own car. In addition to research nearby in Adams County, Ohio, and more widely in the east, Braun made 13 trips to the western United States. She was assisted in her work by her sister Annette, an entomologist and authority on Microlepidoptera. Braun took numerous color photographs of the flora she encountered in her fieldwork, and displayed them as slides to illustrate her very popular lectures, both to university classes and the general public. In the hills of Kentucky during the period of Prohibition, Braun and her sister sometimes explored areas where moonshining was active; however, they maintained the trust of the local inhabitants, honoring local customs and not reporting illegal stills to authorities.

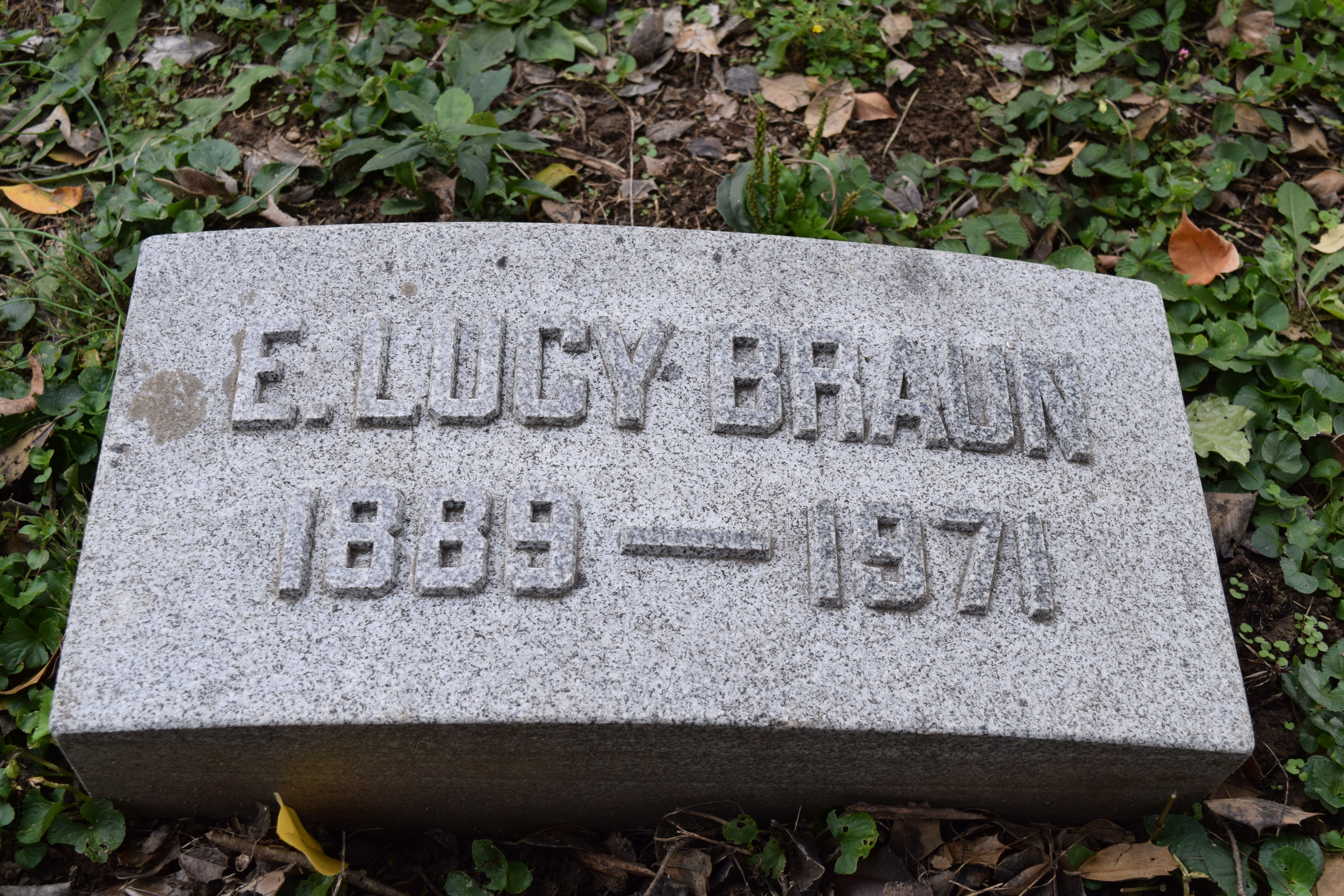
E. Lucy Braun grave marker, Spring Grove Cemetery, Cincinnati, Ohio

Braun set up a laboratory and experimental garden at the home she shared with her sister; she was never married. She died in her home at age 81 of congestive heart failure, and is buried in Cincinnati with her parents and sister in Spring Grove Cemetery.

== Research and advocacy ==
Over her career, Lucy Braun wrote four books and 180 articles published in over twenty journals. Her most remembered and lasting scholarly achievement was Deciduous Forests of Eastern North America (1950). Francis Fosberg said of her book "one can only say that it is a definitive work, and that it has reached a level of excellence seldom or never before attained in American ecology or vegetation science, at least in any work of comparable importance." The book was the culmination of her researches into vascular plant floristics and the composition of various deciduous forest plant communities, which had begun with her investigations of glaciated and unglaciated regions of southern Ohio. In the 1920s and 1930s, Braun's taxonomy work included a new catalog of the flora of the Cincinnati area, with a comparison to the flora of 100 years prior. Her study, one of the first of its kind for the United States, provided a model for analyzing changes to a flora over time. Building from the understanding that the southern Appalachian mountains were a refugium for communities of forest plants during intervals of glaciation, Braun proposed two migrations of prairie flora from the western grasslands during warming periods: a pre-Illinoian movement and a post-Wisconsinan one. She summarized her thinking in "The Phytogeography of Unglaciated Eastern United States and Its Interpretation". In the 1940s, Braun described as new to science four species and four varieties of vascular plants, all from localities in Kentucky, as well as a hybrid fern. On the whole, Lucy Braun is considered one of the most original thinkers in North American plant ecology from the first half of the twentieth century.

As a professor, she had thirteen MA students and one PhD student, nine of which were women; the mentorship of graduate students was uncommon for female professors at the time.

Lucy Braun also fought to conserve natural areas and set up nature reserves, particularly in Adams County. She founded the Cincinnati chapter of the Wild Flower Preservation Society in 1924, contributed to its journal Wild Flower, and served as the journal's editor from 1928 to 1933. Her efforts to protect a 22-acre xeric limestone prairie (Lynx Prairie) led to the establishment of the Richard & Lucile Durrell Edge of Appalachia Preserve System, a 20,000 acre reserve, and ultimately to the creation of The Nature Conservancy.

== Awards, honors, and distinctions ==
Lucy Braun received Guggenheim Fellowships in the field of plant sciences in 1943 and 1944. She was elected President of the Ecological Society of America in 1950, a first for a woman. The E. Lucy Braun Award for Excellence in Ecology is awarded to a student for an outstanding poster presentation at the Society's annual meeting. She was the president of the Ohio Academy of Science from 1933 to 1934, and was inducted into the Ohio Conservation Hall of Fame in 1971, again the first woman in both cases. In 1952, the Cranbrook Institute of Science awarded her the Mary Soper Pope Memorial Award in botany. In 1956, she was awarded a Certificate of Merit by the Botanical Society of America, and she was declared one of 69 distinguished American botanists by the Society in 1961. In 1966, Braun received the Eloise Payne Luquer Medal for special achievement in botany from the Garden Club of America.

She is remembered in the names of four plants, Ageratina luciae-brauniae, Erigeron pulchellus var. brauniae, Silphium terebinthinaceum var. luciae-brauniae, and Viola x brauniae, and one lichen, Rinodina brauniana.

== Selected publications ==
- Braun, E. Lucy (1916). "The Physiographic Ecology of the Cincinnati Region". Ohio Biological Survey Bulletin. II (3). Bulletin No. 7.
- Braun, E. Lucy; Jones, Lynds (1926). "Ohio". In Shelford, Victor E. (ed.). Naturalist's Guide to the Americas. Baltimore, MD: The Williams & Wilkins Company. pp. 354–372. Braun also is an associate editor.
- Braun, E. Lucy (January 1934). "The Lea Herbarium and the Flora of Cincinnati". The American Midland Naturalist. XV (1): 1–75. doi:10.2307/2420211. JSTOR 2420211.
- Braun, E. Lucy (1943). An Annotated Catalog of Spermatophytes of Kentucky. Cincinnati, OH: John Swift Co. ISBN 9781930665309. OCLC 3189946.
- Braun, E. Lucy (1950). Deciduous Forests of Eastern North America. Philadelphia, PA: Blakiston. ISBN 9781930665309. OCLC 814026.
- Braun, E. Lucy (June 1955). "The Phytogeography of Unglaciated Eastern United States and Its Interpretation". The Botanical Review. XXI (6): 297–375. doi:10.1007/bf02872433. JSTOR 4353534. S2CID 41495662.
- Braun, E. Lucy (1967). The Monocotyledoneae: Cat-tails to Orchids. Vascular flora of Ohio; v. 1. Columbus, OH: Ohio State University Press. OCLC 1367040. With Gramineae by Clara G. Weishaupt. Original drawings by Elizabeth Dalvé and Elizabeth King.
- Braun, E. Lucy (1969). The Woody Plants of Ohio: Trees, Shrubs, and Woody Climbers, Native, Naturalized, and Escaped. New York, NY: Hafner Pub. Co. ISBN 9781930665309. OCLC 86890.

== Bibliography ==
- Stuckey, Ronald L. (1997). "Emma Lucy Braun (1889–1971)". In Grinstein, Louise S.; Biermann, Carol A.; Rose, Rose K. (eds.). Women in the Biological Sciences: A Biobibliographic Sourcebook. Westport, CT: Greenwood Press. pp. 44–50. ISBN 978-0-313-29180-7.
- Stuckey, Ronald L. (1980). "Braun, Emma Lucy". In Sicherman, Barbara; Green, Carol Hurd (eds.). Notable American Women: The Modern Period: A Biographical Dictionary. Vol. 4. Cambridge, MA: Belknap Press of Harvard University Press. pp. 102–103. ISBN 9781930665309. OCLC 643624664.
