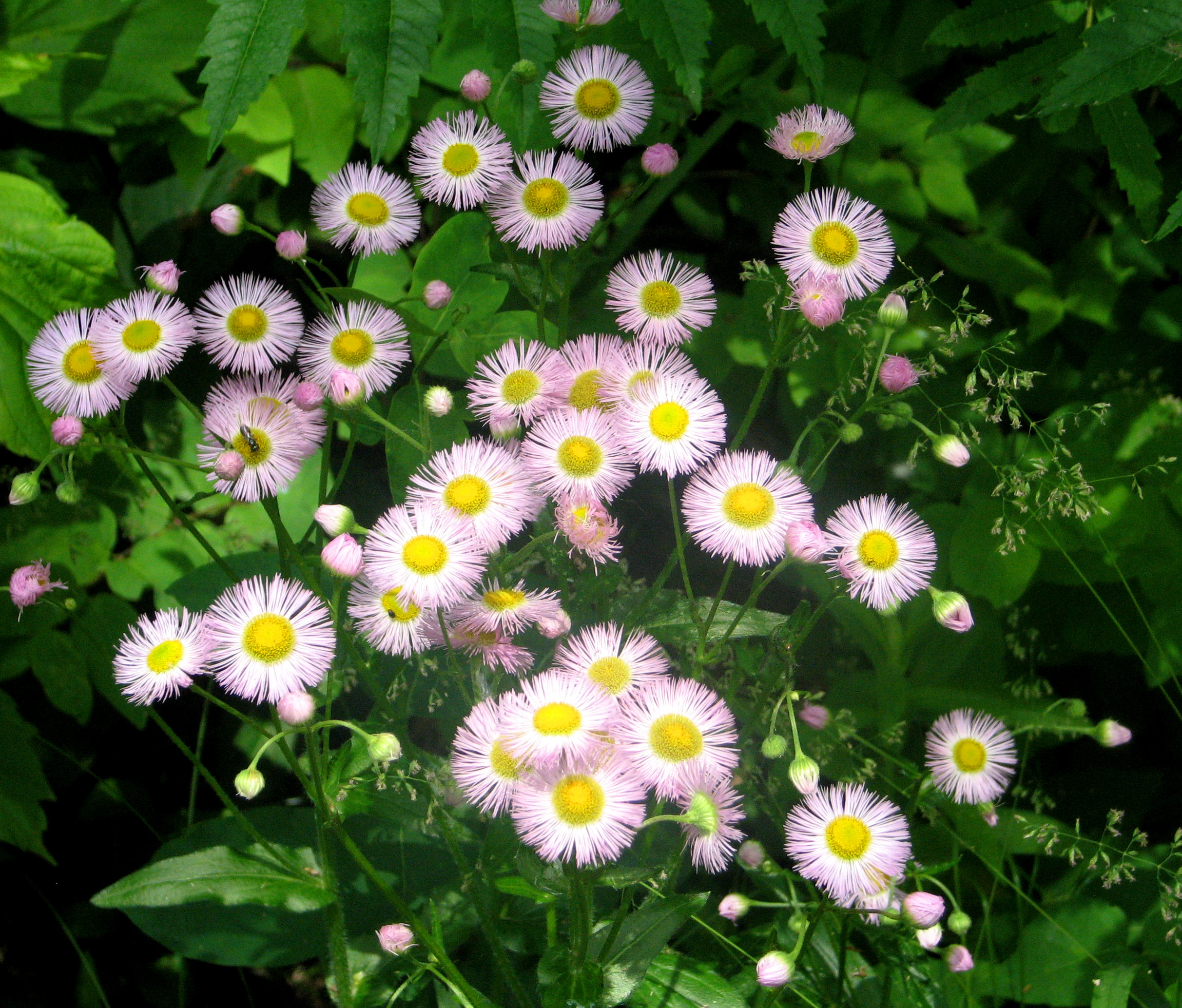
- Ottawa, Ontario, Canada

Conservation status
- Secure (NatureServe)

Scientific classification
- Kingdom: Plantae
- Clade: Embryophytes
- Clade: Tracheophytes
- Clade: Spermatophytes
- Clade: Angiosperms
- Clade: Eudicots
- Clade: Asterids
- Order: Asterales
- Family: Asteraceae
- Genus: Erigeron
- Species: E. philadelphicus

Binomial name
- Erigeron philadelphicus L.

Synonyms
- Erigeron purpureus Aiton; Tessenia philadelphica (L.) Lunell; Erigeron provancheri Vict. & J.Rousseau, syn of var. provancheri

= Erigeron philadelphicus =

Philadelphia fleabane

Species of flowering plant

Erigeron philadelphicus, the Philadelphia fleabane, is a species of flowering plant in the composite family (Asteraceae). Other common names include philadelphia daisy, common fleabane, daisy fleabane, frost-root, marsh fleabane, poor robin's plantain, skevish or skervish, and, in the British Isles, robin's-plantain, but all of these names are shared with other species of fleabanes (Erigeron). It is native to North America and has been introduced to Eurasia.

== Taxonomy ==
=== Varieties ===
Three varieties of Philadelphia fleabane are recognized:

- Common Philadelphia fleabane (Erigeron philadelphicus Linnaeus var. philadelphicus) - Canada, United States, introduced to Eurasia
- Provancher's fleabane (Erigeron philadelphicus var. provancheri (Victorin & J. Rousseau) B. Boivin) - Ontario, Québec, New York, Vermont, Ohio
- Vancouver Island fleabane (Erigeron philadelphicus var. glaber J.K.Henry) - British Columbia

=== Etymology ===
The common name fleabane refers to the antiquated belief that the plants were repellent to fleas.

== Description ==
Philadelphia fleabane is a herbaceous plant growing to about 15–76 centimetres (1/2–2 1/2 feet) tall. The leaves are alternate, simple and up to 15 centimetres (6 inches) long, on hairy stems. The middle to lower leaves are heart shaped. The flower heads are borne in spring in arrays of as many as 35 heads. Each head may sometimes contain as many as 100 to 150 pink or white ray florets surrounding numerous yellow disc florets. The blooms are less than 2.5 cm (1 in) in diameter. The stem is hairy with rough hairs. Its active growth period is from spring to summer (April to July), with flowers until September.

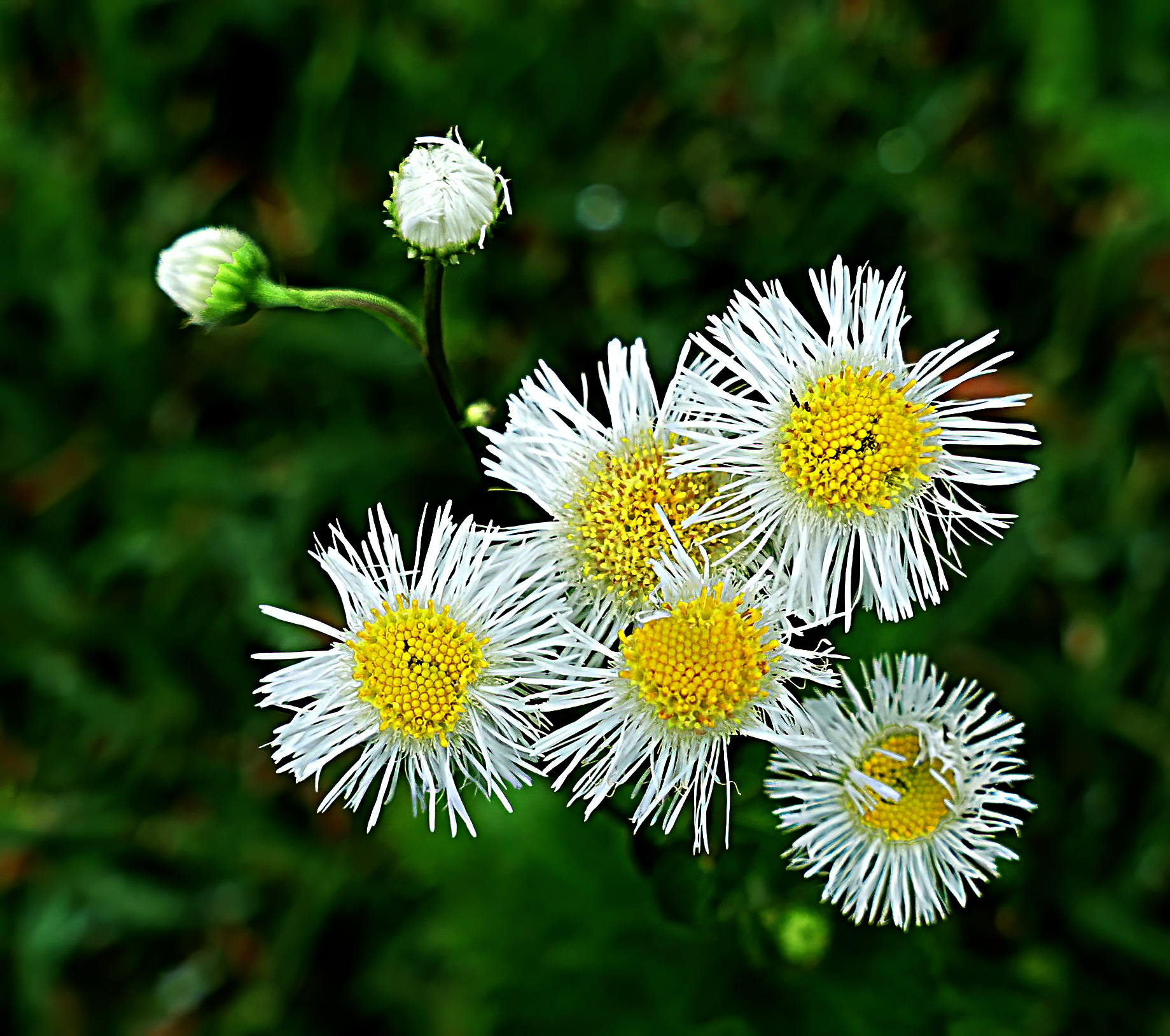
Flower heads and buds

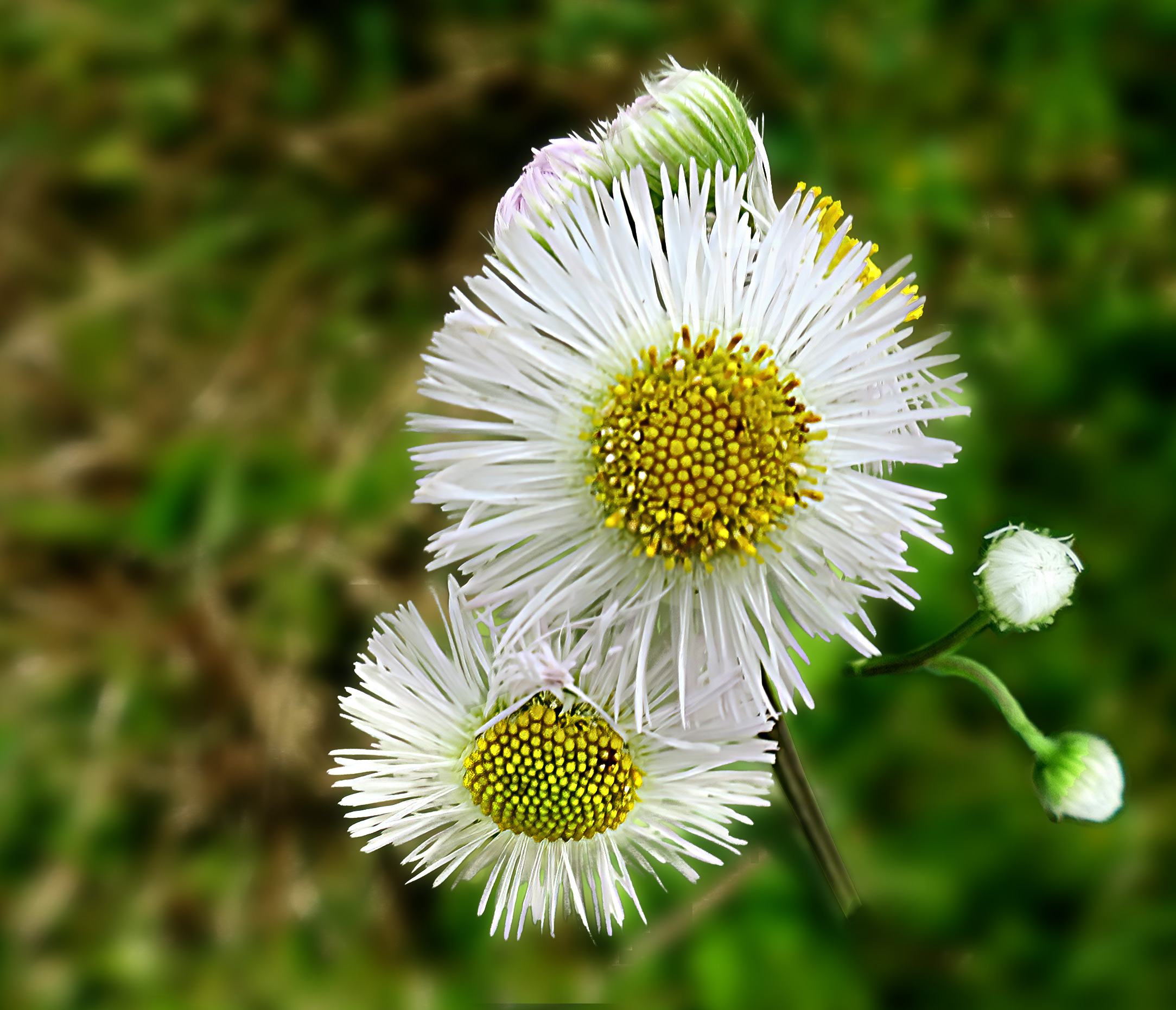
Close-up of flower heads & buds

== Similar species ==
There are several other fleabanes in North America that are similar to common fleabane. Hairy fleabane has fewer ray flowers, usually 40 to 60, and its range is limited to the eastern half of the United States and Canada, while common fleabane has 150 or more ray flowers and a much broader range across North America. Prairie fleabane is an annual, rather than a perennial, from 30–90 centimetres (1–3 feet) tall, and it lacks clasping leaves surrounding the stem. Low Erigeron is shorter, only 5–30 centimetres (0–1 foot) tall, and it can have white, pink, or bluish rays. Its range is the western half of North America.

== Distribution and habitat ==
Philadelphia fleabane is native to North America and found in nearly all of the United States and Canada. It has also been introduced into Europe and Asia, where it is considered an invasive weed in some places. It grows on roadsides, in fields, in thickets, and in open woods. It benefits from moisture and some shade, as well as disturbances.

Provancher's fleabane is restricted to calcareous rocky shorelines in the Great Lakes-St. Lawrence lowlands.

Vancouver Island fleabane is restricted to salt marshes and beaches on Vancouver Island in British Columbia.

== Ecology ==
Common fleabane is a larval host for the obscure schinia moth, and butterflies, bees, and moths pollinate the flowers.

== Conservation ==
Philadelphia fleabane is considered globally secure (G5) and nationally secure (N5) in both Canada and the United States. At the subnational level, it is considered vulnerable (S3) in Montana and North Carolina, imperiled (S2) in Nova Scotia, Wyoming, and Yukon, and critically imperiled (S1) in Colorado.

=== Varieties ===
Because of their distinct phytogeography and habitat affinities, the three accepted varieties of Philadelphia fleabane have been assessed independently by conservation scientists.

==== Common Philadelphia fleabane ====
Common Philadelphia fleabane is common and widespread across most of North America and is also the variety introduced to Eurasia. It is considered globally secure (T5) and nationally secure (N5) in both Canada and the United States. At the subnational level, it is considered secure (S5) or apparently secure (S4) in most of the states and provinces where it occurs, but it is considered imperiled (S2) in Nova Scotia, Wyoming and Yukon, and critically imperiled (S1) in Colorado.

==== Provancher's fleabane ====
Provancher's fleabane is considered globally vulnerable (T3), nationally vulnerable (N3) in Canada, and imperiled (N1N2) in the United States. At the subnational level, it is considered vulnerable (S3) in Ontario and New York, imperiled (S2) in Quebec, and critically imperiled (S1) in Vermont. It is listed as Special Concern under Canada's Species at Risk Act, 2002.

Provancher's fleabane was recently discovered in Ohio, where its conservation status has not been assessed.

==== Vancouver Island fleabane ====
The variety known as Vancouver Island fleabane is endemic to Vancouver Island in British Columbia and is considered globally imperilled (T2) and nationally imperilled (N2) in Canada. It is considered provincially imperilled (S2) in British Columbia, the only province in which it occurs.
