= Rinodina maronisidiata =

Scientific classification
- Domain: Eukaryota
- Kingdom: Fungi
- Division: Ascomycota
- Class: Lecanoromycetes
- Order: Caliciales
- Family: Physciaceae
- Genus: Rinodina
- Species: R. maronisidiata

Binomial name
- Rinodina maronisidiata Kalb & Aptroot (2018)

Species of lichen

Rinodina maronisidiata is a species of corticolous (bark-dwelling), crustose lichen in the family Physciaceae, first described in 2018. Found at high altitudes in the Venezuelan Andes, it is characterised by its unique isidia-covered thallus and specific ascospore morphology.

== Taxonomy ==
Rinodina maronisidiata was formally described as a new species by the lichenologists Klaus Kalb and André Aptroot in 2018. The type specimen was collected in Libertador, Pico Espejo, Mérida, Venezuela, on tree bark in a mountain forest at an elevation of 4,200 m (13,800 ft). The specific epithet maronisidiata refers to the similarity of this species to an isidiate species of Maronina (family Lecanoraceae).

== Description ==
The thallus of Rinodina maronisidiata originates as ochraceous to brown corticated granules, soon covered by a thick layer of isidia and subsequently coalescing. Isidia are cylindrical, corticate (i.e., covered with a cortex), and irregularly densely and repeatedly branched. They are ochraceous to brown, often mottled, dull to partly glossy, and measure approximately 50–80 μm thick and up to 0.4 mm long. The photobiont is chlorococcoid (spherical green algae), about 5–8 μm in diameter. Apothecia are stipitate, 0.4–1.2 mm in diameter, with a medium to dark brown, mostly flat, dull disc. The margin, ochraceous with a yellowish tinge, is usually much higher than the disc. The hymenium is hyaline (translucent), measuring 200–250 μm high. The epithecium is brown, and the hypothecium is hyaline. Ascospores number four to eight per ascus, and are dark brown with a single septum. They measure 31–36 by 13–16 μm and have rounded ends, thick walls, and angular lumina. Pycnidia were not observed to occur in this species.

Chemical analysis of the thallus medulla (in the form of standard chemical spot tests) shows it to be UV+ (greenish white), C+ (orange), and K−. Thin-layer chromatography reveals the presence of arthothelin as the major lichen product.

== Habitat and distribution ==
Rinodina maronisidiata is found on tree bark in mountain forests and at the time of its initial publication was known only to occur in Venezuela.

== See also ==
- List of Rinodina species
