= Ageratina luciae-brauniae =

Conservation status
- Vulnerable (NatureServe)

Scientific classification
- Kingdom: Plantae
- Clade: Tracheophytes
- Clade: Angiosperms
- Clade: Eudicots
- Clade: Asterids
- Order: Asterales
- Family: Asteraceae
- Genus: Ageratina
- Species: A. luciae-brauniae

Binomial name
- Ageratina luciae-brauniae (Fernald) R.M.King & H.Rob.

Synonyms
- Eupatorium luciae-brauniae Fernald; Eupatorium deltoides E.L.Braun 1940 not Jacq. 1798 nor Poepp. & Spreng. 1826 nor Steud. 1840

Species of flowering plant

Ageratina luciae-brauniae is a species of flowering plant in the family Asteraceae known by the common names Lucy Braun's snakeroot and rockhouse white snakeroot. It is native to the eastern United States, where it is endemic to sandstone rockhouses in the Cumberland Plateau of Kentucky and Tennessee. It may also occur in South Carolina but these reports are unconfirmed.

This perennial herb grows 30 to 60 centimeters tall. It has oppositely arranged leaves with thin oval or somewhat triangular blades up to 8 centimeters long by 9 wide. The inflorescence is a cluster of flower heads containing white disc florets and no ray florets.

This plant grows in rockhouses, sandy spaces under overhangs of sandstone rock. It grows in moist places where water drips off the rock above.

There are about 40 to 50 occurrences of the plant. Some populations in Kentucky are large but many are composed of just a few plants.

== Etymology ==
Ageratina is derived from Greek meaning 'un-aging', in reference to the flowers keeping their color for a long time. This name was used by Dioscorides for a number of different plants.

This species was initially described in 1940 by American botanist Dr. Emma Lucy Braun, using the name Eupatorium deltoides. This name turned out to have been used three times before, so it needed to be replaced with a new name. Merritt Lyndon Fernald dubbed it Eupatorium luciae-brauniae after Dr. Braun (1889-1971).

== See also ==
- Emma Lucy Braun
