= Rinodina densisidiata =

Scientific classification
- Domain: Eukaryota
- Kingdom: Fungi
- Division: Ascomycota
- Class: Lecanoromycetes
- Order: Caliciales
- Family: Physciaceae
- Genus: Rinodina
- Species: R. densisidiata

Binomial name
- Rinodina densisidiata Kalb & Aptroot (2018)

Species of lichen

Rinodina densisidiata is a little-known species of corticolous (bark-dwelling), crustose lichen in the family Physciaceae, first described in 2018. Found in Brazil, it is characterised its dense layer of cylindrical isidia and unique ascospore characteristics.

== Taxonomy ==
Rinodina densisidiata was formally described by lichenologists Klaus Kalb and André Aptroot in 2018. The type specimen was collected between Jaciara and Serra de São Vicente, Mato Grosso, Brazil, on tree bark in Cerrado at an altitude of 750 m (2,460 ft). The specimen was collected on 2 July 1980 by the first author. The specific epithet densisidiata refers to the thick layer of isidia that covers the thallus.

== Description ==
The thallus of Rinodina densisidiata originates as glossy brown, thin areoles that coalesce and become densely covered by a 0.4–0.9 mm thick-layer of isidia. Isidia are cylindrical, corticate, irregularly sparingly branched, completely dark brown, glossy, approximately 30–50 μm thick and up to 0.9 mm long. The photobiont is chlorococcoid (i.e., spherical green algae), about 5–8 μm in diameter. Apothecia (fruiting bodies) are stipitate, 0.4–0.7 mm in diameter, with a dark brown, flat to convex, dull disc. The disc margin is dark brown at the inner rim and pale brown outside, usually somewhat higher than the disc, and measures about 0.1 mm wide. The hymenium is hyaline (translucent) and measures 100–120 μm high. The epithecium is brown, and the hypothecium is hyaline. Ascospores number eight per ascus, and are dark brown with a single septum. They measure 15–17 by 6.5–7.5 μm, and have rounded ends, thick walls, and angular lumina. Pycnidia were not observed to occur in this species.

Chemical spot tests on the thallus show it to be UV−, C−, and K−. No thin-layer chromatography was performed.

== Habitat and distribution ==
Rinodina densisidiata is found on tree bark in the Cerrado biome, and at the time of its original publication was known to occur only in Brazil.

== See also ==
- List of Rinodina species
