= Rinodina colobina =

Scientific classification
- Kingdom: Fungi
- Division: Ascomycota
- Class: Lecanoromycetes
- Order: Caliciales
- Family: Physciaceae
- Genus: Rinodina
- Species: R. colobina

Binomial name
- Rinodina colobina (Ach.) Th.Fr. (1810)

Synonyms
- Lecanora colobina Ach. (1810); Rinodina leprosa A.Massal. (1856)

Species of lichen

Rinodina colobina is a species of corticolous (bark-dwelling) crustose lichen in the family Physciaceae. It has a dark grey, granular appearance and typically grows on nutrient-rich bark of deciduous trees, including elm, maple, and oak. The lichen is characterised by small black reproductive structures (apothecia) surrounded by a grey margin. It is widely distributed across Europe and North America, favouring areas with consistently high humidity levels.

== Description ==
Rinodina colobina is a crustose lichen characterised by its thin, dark grey thallus (the main body of the lichen) that typically appears granular or with small cracks. The thallus lacks a visible hypothallus (the underlying fungal layer).

The apothecia (reproductive structures) are sessile, meaning they sit on top of the thallus rather than being immersed, and measure 0.35–0.45 mm in diameter. They are relatively sparse and rarely touch each other. The disc of the apothecium is black and becomes slightly convex as it matures. The margin around the disc matches the colour of the thallus or appears somewhat lighter, measuring approximately 0.05 mm in width. This margin is smooth-edged and persists as the lichen develops.

One of the most distinctive features of Rinodina colobina is its blue-black epithecium (the uppermost layer of the apothecium), which reacts positively with potassium hydroxide solution (K+) and nitric acid (N+) to produce a violet colour. This characteristic helps distinguish it from other similar Rinodina species.

The spores are polarilocular (with thickened walls and two chambers) and thick-walled, measuring 12.5–23.5 μm long by 5.0–11.5 μm wide. The outer wall of the spore is thick, and the septum (dividing partition) develops late in the spore's maturation.

== Habitat and distribution ==
Rinodina colobina typically grows as an epiphyte, primarily on the bark of trees (corticolous). It prefers nutrient-rich or eutrophic bark, particularly that of deciduous trees, although it occasionally colonises wood or lignin substrates. Its most common host trees include species of elm (Ulmus), poplar (Populus), maple (Acer), ash (Fraxinus), and oak (Quercus). In Greece, it can use Melia azedarach as a host tree.

The distribution of R. colobina covers extensive regions across Europe and North America. Within Europe, it is found widely throughout central and southern areas, although it becomes somewhat rarer towards northern regions. In North America, its distribution extends through eastern and midwestern United States as well as southeastern parts of Canada. The species favours humid climates and can frequently be encountered in areas where air humidity levels are consistently elevated.

In the Nordic countries, R. colobina tends to be found on sunny, nutrient-rich trees, typically growing on solitary trees, park and churchyard trees, or roadside trees, particularly on the south or southwest-facing side. The species has been documented on hosts such as Fraxinus excelsior, Populus tremula, and Ulmus glabra across Sweden and Norway.

== See also ==
- List of Rinodina species
