= Rinodina brauniana =

Scientific classification
- Domain: Eukaryota
- Kingdom: Fungi
- Division: Ascomycota
- Class: Lecanoromycetes
- Order: Caliciales
- Family: Physciaceae
- Genus: Rinodina
- Species: R. brauniana

Binomial name
- Rinodina brauniana Lendemer & Sheard (2019)

Species of lichen

Rinodina brauniana is a species of lichen in the family Physciaceae. It was described as new to science in 2019 and grows in North America in the Southern Appalachian Mountains in North Carolina, Tennessee and Alabama. It lives on the bark of deciduous trees, shrubs, and conifers. It was named in honor of Emma Lucy Braun.
