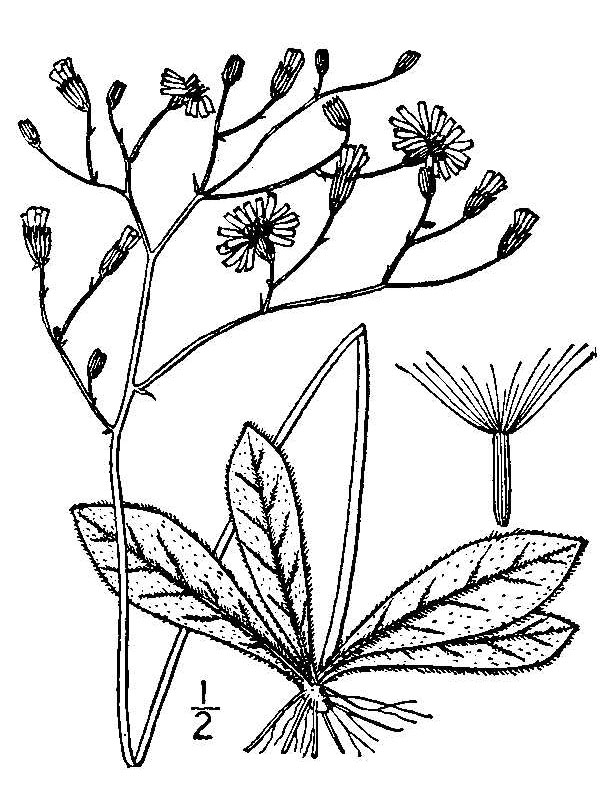
- 1913 illustration

Scientific classification
- Kingdom: Plantae
- Clade: Tracheophytes
- Clade: Angiosperms
- Clade: Eudicots
- Clade: Asterids
- Order: Asterales
- Family: Asteraceae
- Genus: Hieracium
- Species: H. venosum

Binomial name
- Hieracium venosum L. 1753

Synonyms
- Hieracium gronovii var. nudicaule Michx.; Hieracium venosum var. nudicaule (Michx.) Farw.

= Hieracium venosum =

Species of flowering plant

Hieracium venosum (Robin's plantain, rattlesnakeweed, or rattlesnake hawkweed) is a species of hawkweed in the tribe Cichorieae within the family Asteraceae. It is widespread and common in south-central Canada (Ontario) and the eastern United States (from Michigan east to Maine and south as far as Florida and Mississippi). Its common name comes from the fact that environments it is found in are typically also a home to rattlesnakes.

Hieracium venosum is a hairy herb up to 45 cm (18 inches) tall, with most of the leaves crowded around the base of the stem. One plant can produce as many as 20 flower heads, each with 30–45 yellow ray flowers but no disc flowers. It is a perennial that blooms from May to September, and prefers shady conditions with dry, sandy soil.

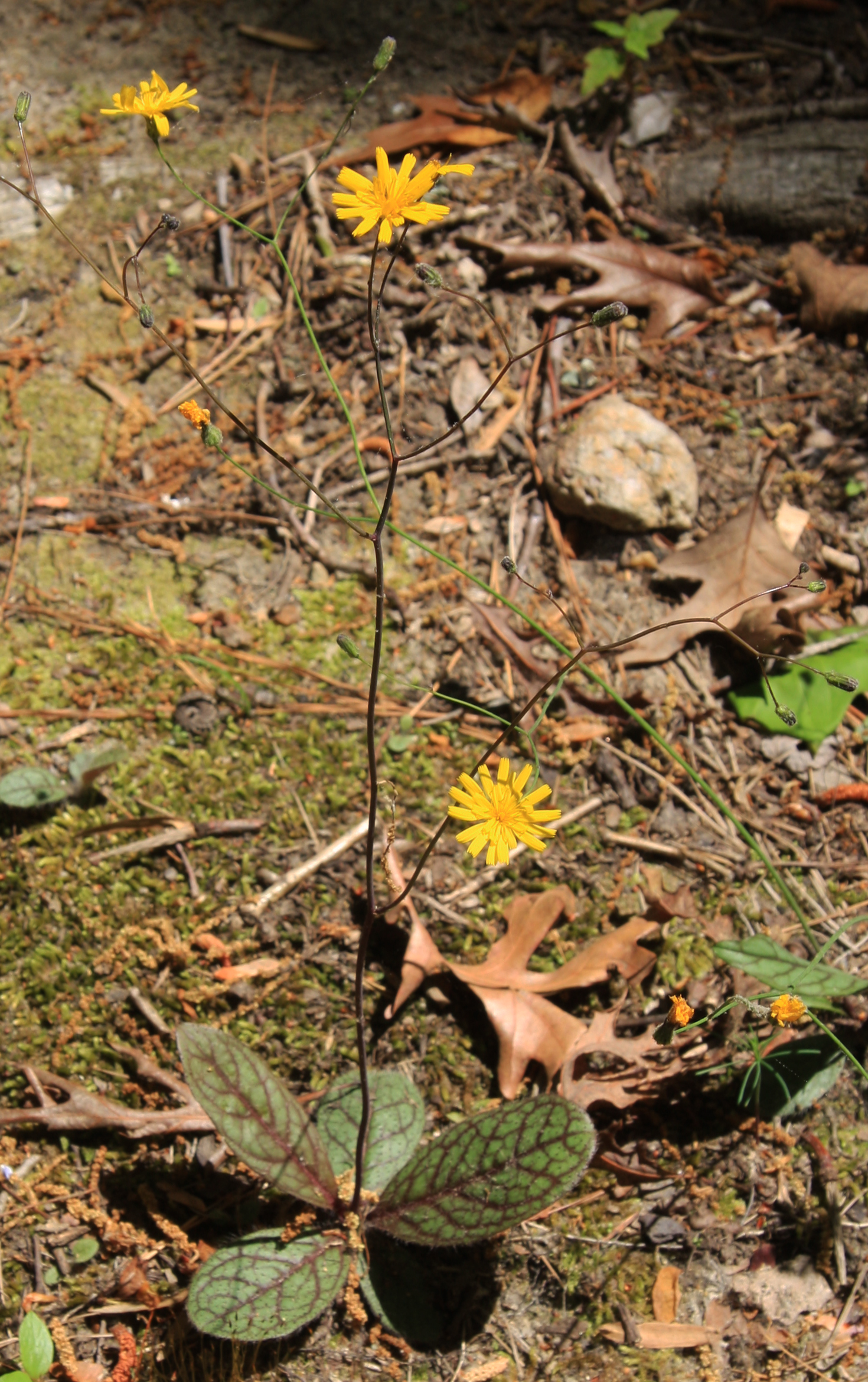
Hieracium venosum flowering, with leaves crowded around the base.

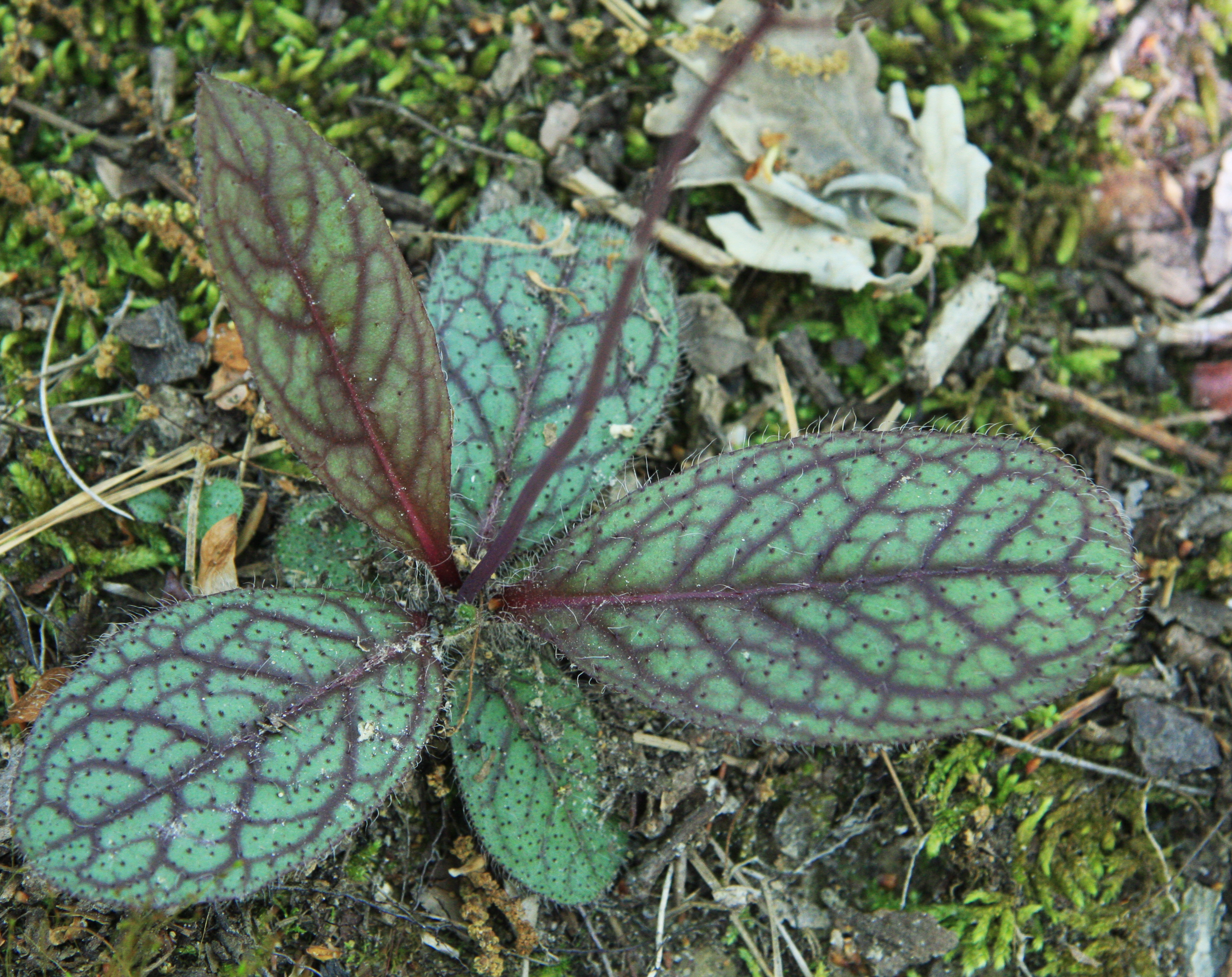
Leaves detail.

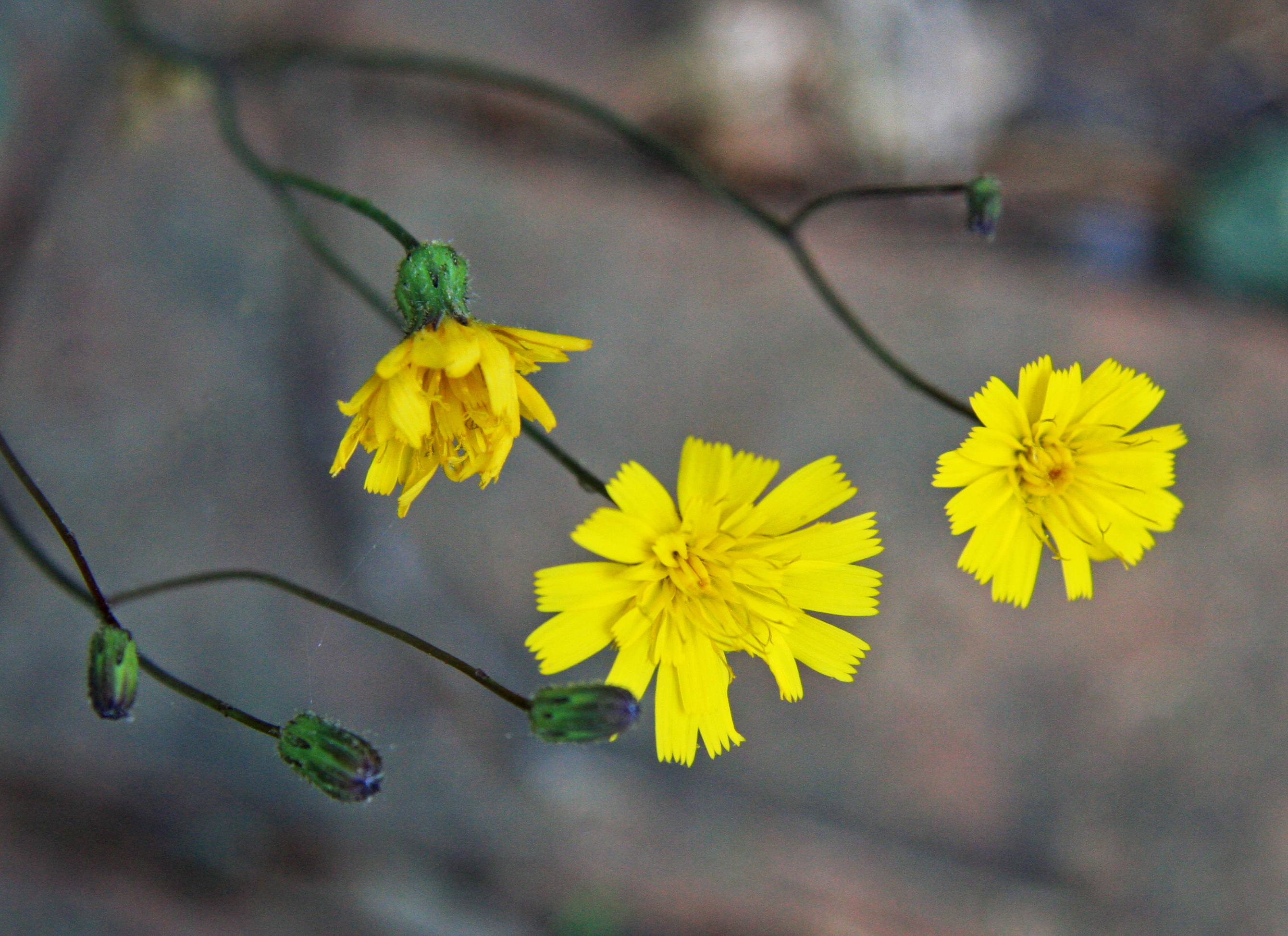
Flower detail.

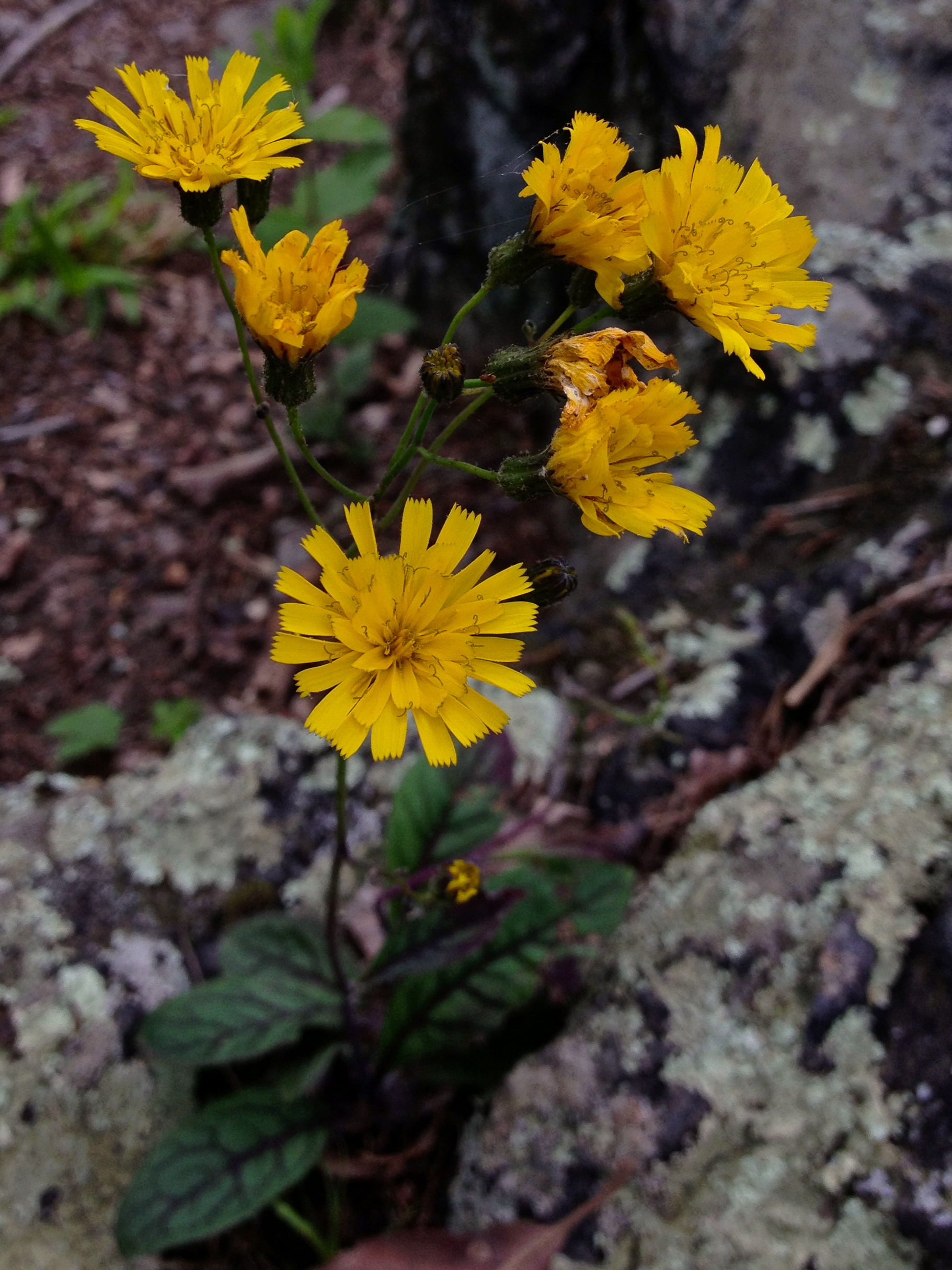
6 yellow ray flowers.
