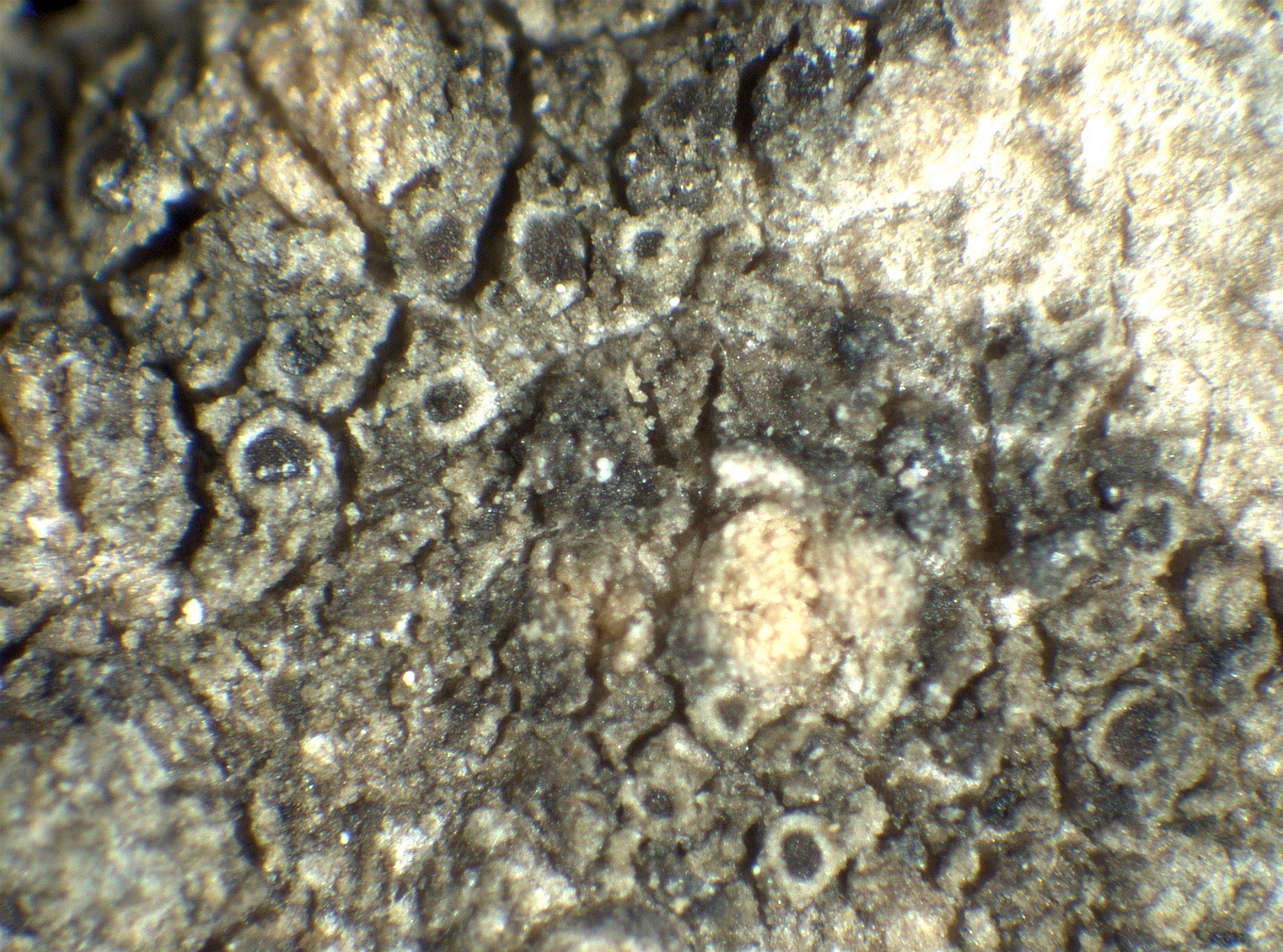

Scientific classification
- Kingdom: Fungi
- Division: Ascomycota
- Class: Lecanoromycetes
- Order: Caliciales
- Family: Physciaceae
- Genus: Rinodina
- Species: R. exigua

Binomial name
- Rinodina exigua (Ach.) Gray (1821)

Synonyms
- List: Lichen exiguus Ach. (1799); Parmelia exigua (Ach.) Ach. (1803); Patellaria exigua (Ach.) DC. (1805); Lecanora periclea var. exigua (Ach.) Ach. (1810); Lecanora exigua (Ach.) Röhl. (1813); Parmelia periclea var. exigua (Ach.) J.Becker (1828); Courtoisia exigua (Ach.) L.Marchand (1830); Parmelia sophodes f. exigua (Ach.) Fr. (1831); Parmelia sophodes var. exigua (Ach.) Fr. (1831); Lecanora sophodes var. exigua (Ach.) Link (1833); Lecanora atra var. exigua (Ach.) Schaer. (1850); Berengeria exigua (Ach.) Trevis. (1852); Psora exigua (Ach.) Nägeli (1853); Rinodina metabolica var. exigua (Ach.) Körb. (1855); Lecanora sophodes f. exigua (Ach.) Leight. (1871); Rinodina sophodes f. exigua (Ach.) Arnold (1871); Lecanora sophodes subsp. exigua (Ach.) Nyl. (1876); Rinodina sophodes var. exigua (Ach.) Tuck. (1882); Rinodina sophodes subsp. exigua (Ach.) Fink (1910)

= Rinodina exigua =

Species of lichen

Rinodina exigua is a species of lichen belonging to the family Physciaceae, characterised by its thin, pale grey-green thallus (body) with an irregular, cracked surface. First described by Erik Acharius in 1798, it features distinctive black reproductive structures (apothecia) that measure 300–460 micrometres in diameter. The lichen grows primarily on tree bark, particularly on ash and oak trees in the United Kingdom, while in continental Europe it shows an altitudinal distribution pattern, occurring mainly in mountains in southern regions but across various elevations in Central Europe. It typically grows alongside other nitrogen-tolerant lichen species and can be identified by its response to specific chemical spot tests.

== Taxonomy ==
Rinodina exigua was first described as Lichen exiguus by Erik Acharius in his 1798 work Lichenographiae Suecicae Prodromus. Samuel Frederick Gray later transferred it to the genus Rinodina in his A Natural Arrangement of British Plants (1821).

Rinodina exigua belongs to the section Rinodina (formerly known as Eurinodina), characterised by polarilocular spores with a well-developed septum at maturity. Within this section, it is placed in series Exiguina, distinguished by thick-walled spores with unequally thickened walls and irregular lumina.

== Description ==
Rinodina exigua is characterised by its relatively thin thallus (main body) that appears pale grey-green in colour. The thallus has an irregular, cracked structure with an uneven, granular surface that sometimes develops small scale-like formations (squamules), and lacks distinct boundaries, spreading diffusely across its substrate. No clearly defined border (prothallus) is visible between the lichen and surrounding surfaces.

The reproductive structures (apothecia) are quite noticeable, measuring 300–460 μm in diameter. These dark fruiting bodies are either attached to the surface (sessile) or partially embedded within the thallus (semi-immersed). They often occur abundantly and may grow so closely together that they touch. Each apothecium is surrounded by a rim (thalline margin) that matches the colour of the main thallus, measuring 20–30 μm wide. This rim remains intact throughout the lichen's development, though it may develop slight scalloping (crenulation) with age. The central disc of the apothecium is black, initially flat but becoming convex as it matures.

The spore-producing layer (hymenium) measures 160–200 μm in height and turns blue when stained with iodine solution (I+). Beneath this lies a pale yellow layer (hypothecium) measuring 120–140 μm that does not react with iodine (I−). The spore sacs (asci) measure 130–160 by 15–19 μm with uniformly thick inner walls.

The dark brown spores (ascospores) measure (12.5–) 14–17.5 by (7–) 8–10 μm, featuring thick walls with rounded to conical compartments. They have a structure typical of the Physcia-type, with the central dividing wall (septum) being thickened and darkly pigmented in the middle. The spores lack a gelatinous outer coating. Asexual reproductive structures (pycnidia) have not been observed in this species.

Chemical spot test analysis shows that the thallus is K+ (yellow to orange) and Pd+ (yellowish). These chemical reactions are important diagnostic features for species identification.

== Habitat and distribution ==
Rinodina exigua is an epiphyte that grows on the bark of trees. In Greece, it can use Robinia as a host tree. In the United Kingdom, R. exigua grows on the bark of old Fraxinus and Quercus trees. Within Ukraine, R. exigua has been documented in both the Crimean Peninsula and the Carpathian mountain range. Its European distribution shows a distinct pattern: in the southern regions of Europe, it primarily inhabits mountainous areas, whereas in Central Europe, the species can be found across a broader altitudinal range, from lowlands to mid-elevation sites. The lichen typically grows alongside other nitrogen-tolerant species, including Rinodina pyrina, Lecanora hagenii, Caloplaca alnetorum, and Caloplaca holocarpa. It does not occur in South Africa; historical records of taxa labelled under this named were later determined to be Rinodina ficta.

== See also ==
- List of Rinodina species
