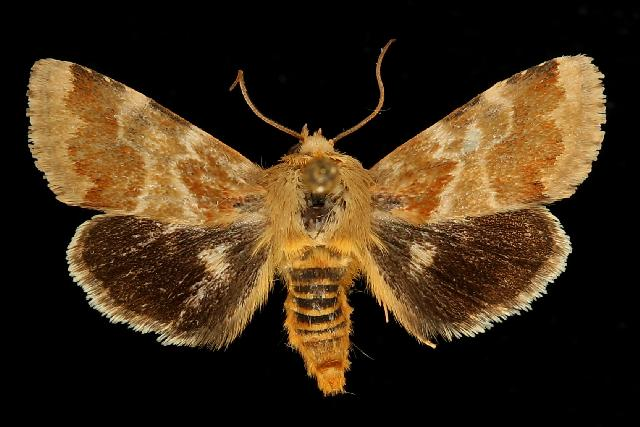

Scientific classification
- Domain: Eukaryota
- Kingdom: Animalia
- Phylum: Arthropoda
- Class: Insecta
- Order: Lepidoptera
- Superfamily: Noctuoidea
- Family: Noctuidae
- Genus: Schinia
- Species: S. obscurata

Binomial name
- Schinia obscurata Strecker, 1898

Synonyms
- Schinia tanena Strecker, 1898

= Schinia obscurata =

Species of moth

Schinia obscurata, the obscure schinia moth, is a moth of the family Noctuidae. It is found from Ontario and Quebec south into the United States, where it has been recorded from Illinois, New Jersey, South Carolina, Wisconsin, Kansas, Montana, Nebraska, North Dakota, Oklahoma and Texas.

The larvae feed on Erigeron species.

== Subspecies ==
- Schinia obscurata obscurata
- Schinia obscurata tanena Strecker, 1898
