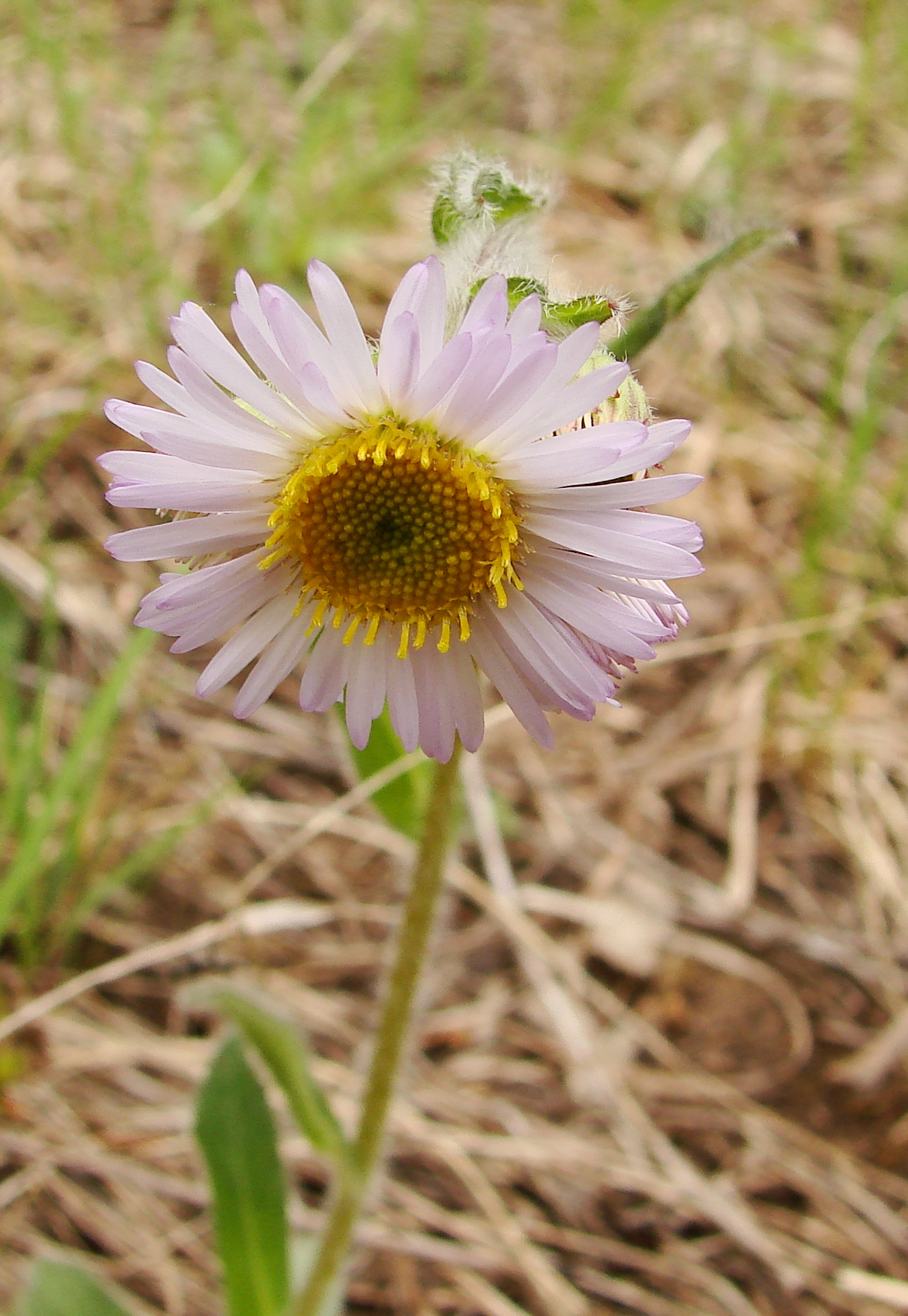
- Cross Plains, Wisconsin

Conservation status
- Secure (NatureServe)

Scientific classification
- Kingdom: Plantae
- Clade: Tracheophytes
- Clade: Angiosperms
- Clade: Eudicots
- Clade: Asterids
- Order: Asterales
- Family: Asteraceae
- Genus: Erigeron
- Species: E. pulchellus

Binomial name
- Erigeron pulchellus Michx. (1803) not (Willd.) DC. (1836) not Hook. 1834 nor Turcz. 1838

Synonyms
- Synonymy: Aster alwartensis Lodd. ex Sims.; Aster rupestris E.H.L.Krause; Diplopappus bellidioides Hook. & Arn.; Erigeron acris C.B.Clarke; Erigeron alpestris Hoppe ex Nyman; Erigeron alpinus Pursh 1813 not L. 1753; Erigeron alpinus Less. 1831 not L. 1753; Erigeron apenninianus Georgi; Erigeron armenus Boiss. & Huet ex Boiss.; Erigeron bellidifolium Muhl. ex Willd.; Erigeron bellidifolius Muhl. ex Willd.; Erigeron bethlehemi Schoepf; Erigeron bithynicus Vierh.; Erigeron frigidus Boiss. & Buhse ex Boiss.; Erigeron funkii Sch.Bip. ex Nyman; Erigeron glaber Hoppe ex Nyman; Erigeron glacialis Fisch. ex Herder 1904 not Fisch. ex Herder 1865; Erigeron grandiflorus Willd. ex Spreng.; Erigeron grandiflorus Hoppe ex DC.; Erigeron leschenaultii DC.; Erigeron monocephalus Schur; Erigeron patentisquama Jeffrey; Erigeron pulchellus Turcz. 1838 not Michx. 1803; Erigeron pycnotrichus Schott & Kotschy ex Tchich.; Erigeron rupestris Hoppe ex DC.; Erigeron serpentarius Banks ex Steud.; Erigeron unifloroides Vierh.; Erigeron uniflorus Sm. 1826 not L. 1753; Fragmosa alpina (L.) Raf. ex B.D.Jacks.; Fragmosa uniflora (L.) Raf.

= Erigeron pulchellus =

Species of flowering plant

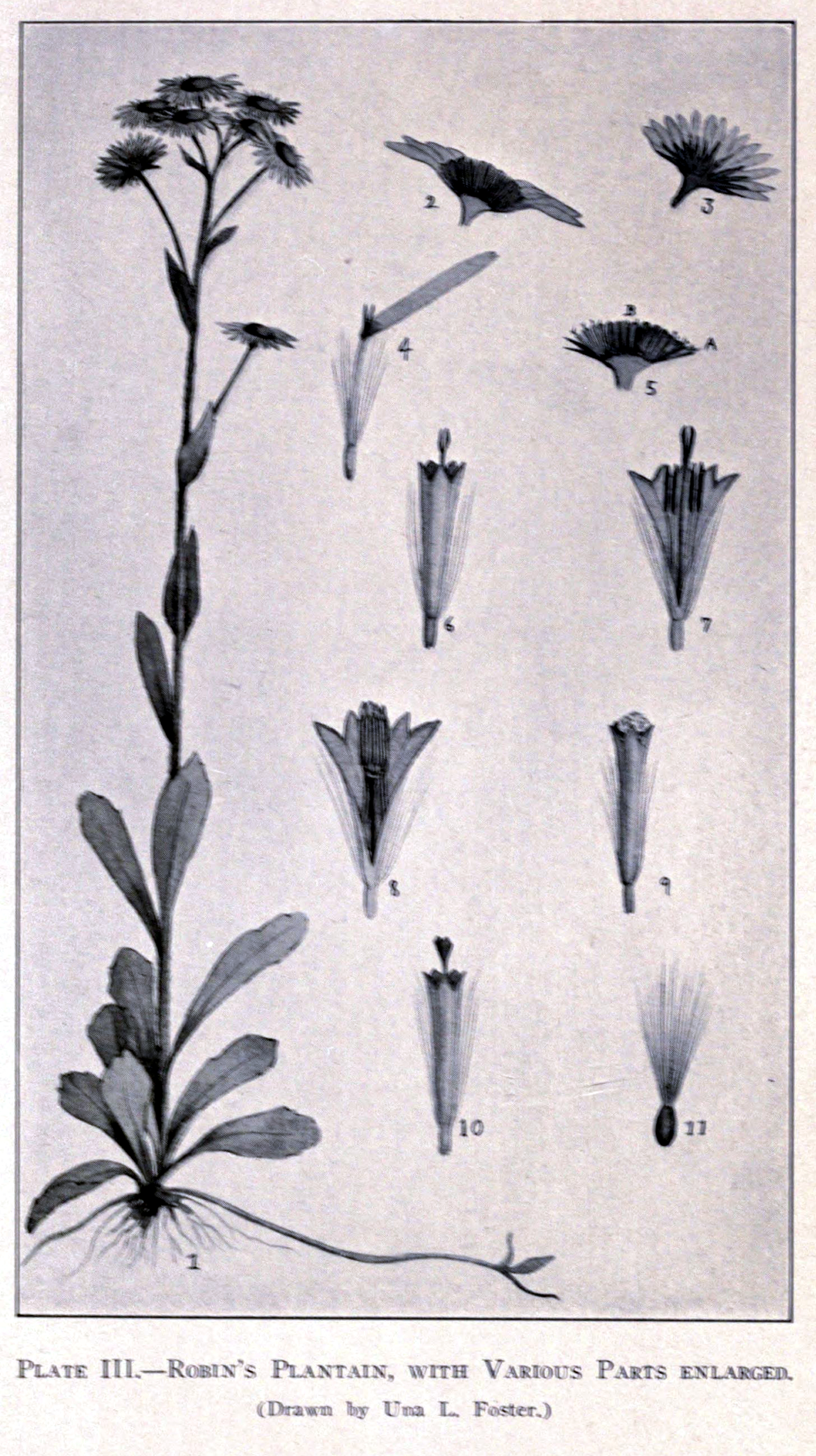
Botanical illustration of Erigeron pulchellus], showing the various parts of the plant including the structure of its flowers, by Una Weatherby.

Erigeron pulchellus, the Robin's plantain, poor Robin's plantain, blue spring daisy or hairy fleabane, is a North American species of plants in the family Asteraceae. It is widespread across much of the United States and Canada from Québec and Ontario south as far as eastern Texas and the Florida Panhandle.

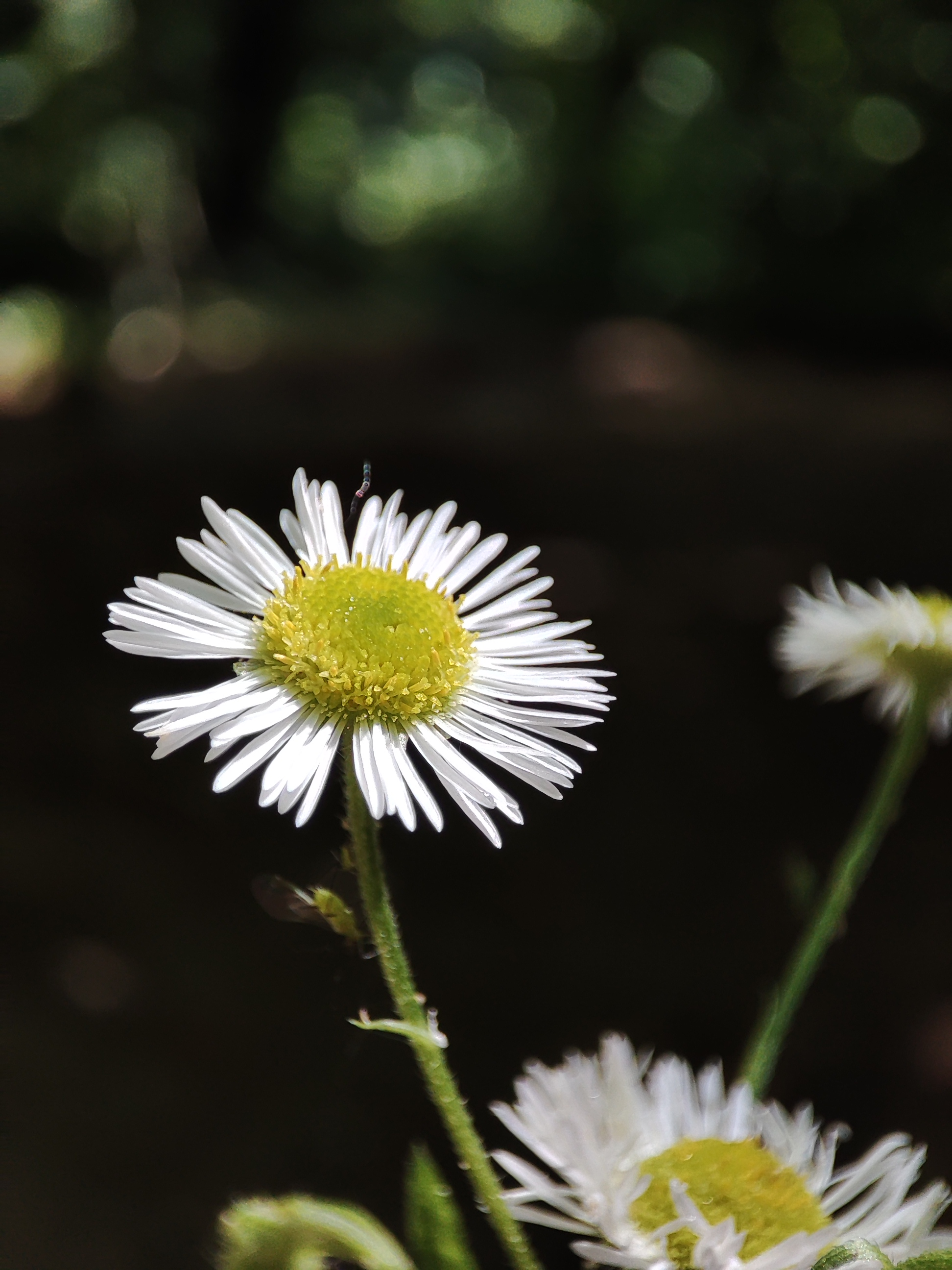
Erigeron pulchellus flower

E. pulchellus is a perennial herb up to 60 cm (2 feet) tall, spreading by means of underground rhizomes. It produces 1-9 flower heads per stem, each head containing sometimes as many as 100 white, pink, pale blue, or pale purple ray florets surrounding many yellow disc florets. The species grows in forests, roadsides, and the banks of bodies of water.

Varieties

- Erigeron pulchellus var. brauniae Fernald - Kentucky, Ohio, West Virginia
- Erigeron pulchellus var. pulchellus - most of species range
- Erigeron pulchellus var. tolsteadii Cronquist - Minnesota
