= Maronina =

Scientific classification
- Kingdom: Fungi
- Division: Ascomycota
- Class: Lecanoromycetes
- Order: Lecanorales
- Family: Lecanoraceae
- Genus: Maronina; Hafellner & R.W.Rogers (1990)

Type species
- Maronina australiensis Hafellner & R.W.Rogers (1990)

Species
- M. australiensis M. badiola M. microspora

Genus of lichen-forming fungi

Maronina is a genus of crustose, lichen-forming fungi in the family Parmeliaceae (order Lecanorales). It currently comprises three species, with the type species, Maronina australiensis, restricted to mangrove habitats in subtropical eastern Australia. The genus was established in 1990 for species with unusually many-spored asci, but its circumscription has undergone several revisions based on DNA evidence, leading to the removal of most tropical bark-dwelling species to other genera, particularly Neoprotoparmelia. In the strict circumscription proposed from DNA evidence, Maronina is distinguished by its crustose thallus, lecanorine fruiting bodies (apothecia) with brown discs, many-spored asci, and chemistry dominated by depsides rather than depsidones.

== Taxonomy ==
The genus Maronina was described in 1990 by Josef Hafellner and Roger W. Rogers to accommodate two species with multispored asci, M. australiensis (the type species) from Australia and M. multifera from tropical South America. In the original circumscription, Maronina was separated from the superficially similar genus Maronea chiefly by ascus and spore characters, and was regarded as more closely related to Protoparmelia than to Maronea.

Gintaras Kantvilas and John Elix re-examined the group in 2007, described M. hesperia from Western Australia, and argued that the genus as then understood was heterogeneous, with M. multifera likely belonging elsewhere. In 2010, Kantvilas and co-authors described a further species from Thailand, M. orientalis, including an isidiate variety (var. corallifera), and reassessed Maronina as a variable genus defined by a crustose thallus, lecanorine apothecia, and polysporous asci of a modified Lecanora-type.

Khwanruan Papong and colleagues (2011) combined phenotypic comparisons with DNA sequence data and concluded that the sampled Maronina species were nested within Protoparmelia, so they reduced Maronina to synonymy with Protoparmelia and published new combinations accordingly. Divakar and co-authors (2017) later applied a divergence-time ("temporal banding") approach to higher classification in Parmeliaceae and resurrected Maronina as a genus separate from Protoparmelia within a newly recognised subfamily, Protoparmelioideae. Under that time-calibrated framework, Protoparmelia and Maronina were treated as the two main lineages of Protoparmelioideae, with Protoparmelia largely temperate and saxicolous (rock-dwelling) and Maronina largely tropical and corticolous (bark-dwelling). Singh and co-authors (2018) obtained the first internal transcribed spacer (ITS) barcode sequence from the type species M. australiensis and showed that it is not closely related to the mainly tropical group that had been treated as Maronina; they proposed restricting Maronina to M. australiensis and M. hesperia and placing the remaining species in the new genus Neoprotoparmelia.

== Description ==
Maronina species form a crustose (crust-like) thallus that contains a green algal photobiont described as chlorococcoid and trebouxioid. The apothecia are lecanorine, meaning the fruiting bodies have a rim formed from thallus tissue, with discs typically brown to dark brown. The asci are variations of the Lecanora-type and contain many spores, with an intensely amyloid outer wall and a well-developed amyloid tholus, while the ocular chamber is poorly developed.

The ascospores are hyaline, single-celled (non-septate), narrow ellipsoid to bacilliform, and non-halonate (lacking a distinct halo). Pycnidia are immersed in the thallus and produce straight, bacilliform conidia. In the Australian species treated as Maronina in the strict sense (sensu stricto), the paraphyses are described as rather robust and mainly simple, with only occasional anastomoses. Chemically, Maronina sensu stricto is characterised by depsides rather than the depsidones that dominate in the tropical–subtropical lineage now treated as Neoprotoparmelia. In Maronina australiensis, thin-layer chromatography has revealed two unidentified depsides together with additional trace compounds.

== Habitat and distribution ==
In their original account, Hafellner and Rogers described Maronina (as then circumscribed) as a tropical to subtropical genus, most often found on bark, with an approximate latitudinal range from about 30°S to 20°N. Subsequent authors noted that this broad concept grouped together anatomically and chemically divergent elements, suggesting that the genus was heterogeneous.

Maronina australiensis appears restricted to mangroves in subtropical eastern Australia (southern Queensland), where it grows on the bark of mangrove trees such as Rhizophora stylosa and Ceriops tagal. Maronina microspora (described as Protoparmelia microspora) has been recorded from the La Cortadura mountain cloud forest in Veracruz, Mexico, where it occurs on bark of Quercus laurina. Maronina badiola was transferred to Maronina as part of the mostly tropical, bark-dwelling lineage treated as Maronina under a temporal-band classification. The broader set of tropical and subtropical species previously placed in Maronina by some authors is now treated as a separate, pantropical genus (Neoprotoparmelia), largely occurring in open habitats and mostly on bark.

== Species ==
Species concepts in Maronina differ between sources; the list below follows the broader usage that retains the type species and includes the combinations made by Divakar and colleagues (2017), while Singh and co-authors (2018) proposed restricting Maronina to the Australian lineage.

- Maronina australiensis Hafellner & R.W.Rogers (1990) – (type species), described from Queensland mangroves and known from coastal southern Queensland on mangrove bark.
- Maronina badiola (Müll.Arg.) Divakar, A.Crespo & Lumbsch (2017) – transferred to Maronina by Divakar and colleagues (2017)
- Maronina microspora (Córd.-Cháv., Aptroot & M.Cáceres) Divakar, A.Crespo & Lumbsch (2017) – transferred to Maronina by Divakar and colleagues (2017)

Former species:

- Maronina capitata (Lendemer) Divakar, A.Crespo & Lumbsch (2017) is now Neoprotoparmelia capitata
- Maronina corallifera (Kantvilas & Papong) Divakar, A.Crespo & Lumbsch (2017) is now Neoprotoparmelia corallifera
- Maronina hesperia Kantvilas & Elix (2007) is now Protoparmelia hesperia
- Maronina isidiata (Diederich, Aptroot & Sérus.) Divakar, A.Crespo & Lumbsch (2017) is now Neoprotoparmelia isidiata
- Maronina multifera (Nyl.) Hafellner & R.W.Rogers (1990) is now Neoprotoparmelia multifera
- Maronina orientalis Kantvilas & Papong (2010) is now Neoprotoparmelia orientalis
- Maronina orientalis var. corallifera Kantvilas & Papong (2010) is now Neoprotoparmelia corallifera
- Maronina pulchra (Diederich, Aptroot & Sérus.) Divakar, A.Crespo & Lumbsch (2017) is now Neoprotoparmelia pulchra
- Maronina saxicola Aptroot & M.Cáceres (2018) is now Neoprotoparmelia saxicola
