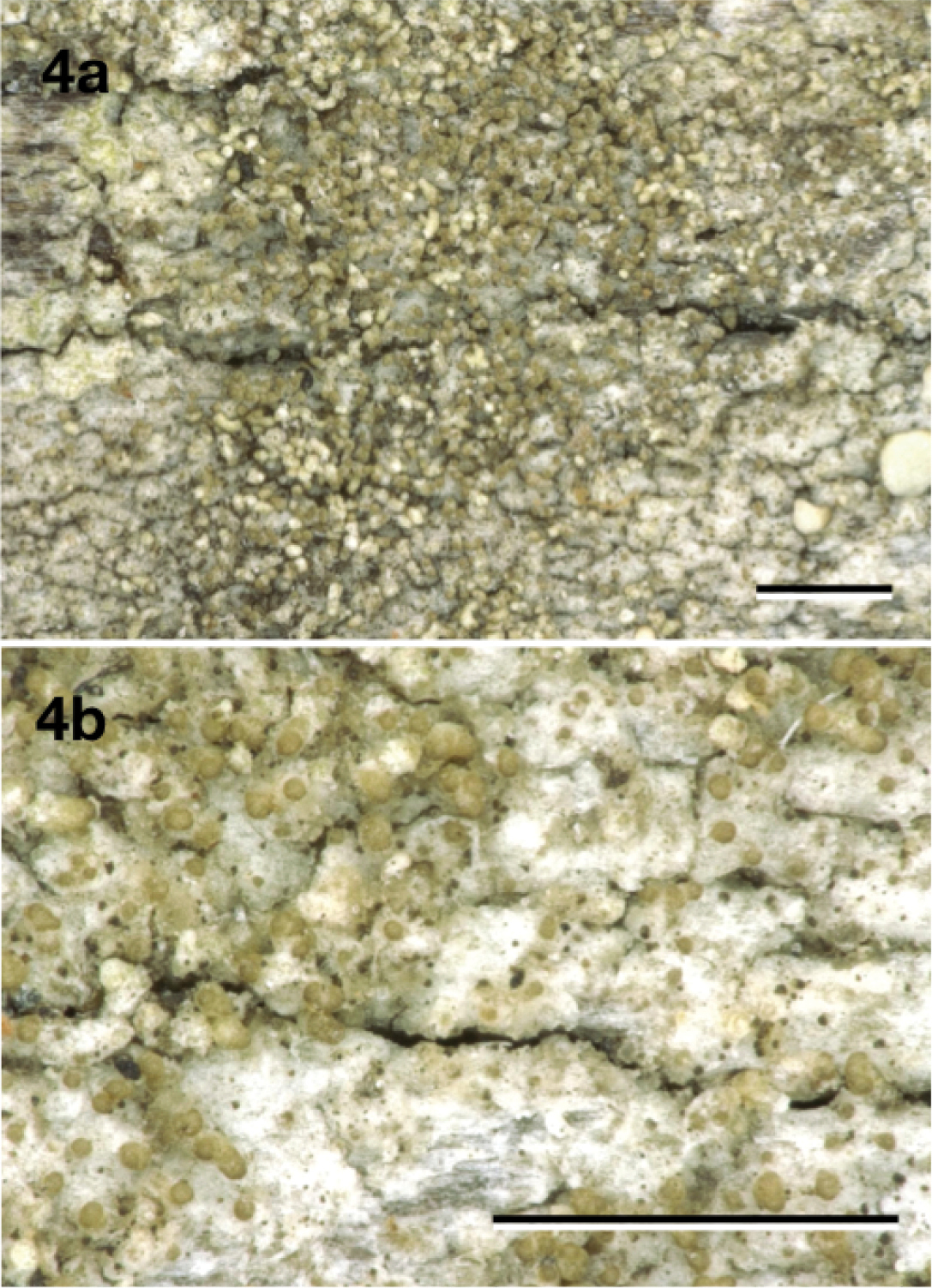
- Image of holotype specimen; scale bar = 1 mm

Scientific classification
- Domain: Eukaryota
- Kingdom: Fungi
- Division: Ascomycota
- Class: Lecanoromycetes
- Order: Lecanorales
- Family: Parmeliaceae
- Genus: Neoprotoparmelia
- Species: N. amerisidiata

Binomial name
- Neoprotoparmelia amerisidiata Garima Singh & Aptroot 2018

= Neoprotoparmelia amerisidiata =

Species of lichen

Neoprotoparmelia amerisidiata is a species of corticolous (bark dwelling) and crustose lichen in the family Parmeliaceae. Found in the southeastern United States, it was formally described as a new species in 2018 by Garima Singh and André Aptroot. The type specimen was collected by James Lendemer in the Sapelo Island Wildlife Management Area (Sapelo Island, Georgia); here the lichen was found growing on oak bark. It has a thin, shiny, pale olive-green to olive-grey thallus with numerous isidia. Secondary chemicals in the lichen that are detectable with thin-layer chromatography include alectoronic acid (major), and lesser to trace amounts of dehydroalectoronic acid and β-alectoronic acid. The specific epithet amerisidiata refers to both its North American distribution and the presence of isidia. It is known from North Carolina, Alabama, Georgia, Mississippi, and Florida.

== Taxonomy ==
Neoprotoparmelia amerisidiata was formally described in 2018, when molecular data showed that several North-American specimens long treated as part of the tropical species Protoparmelia isidiata represented a genetically distinct lineage. Because the group clusters with other tropical-subtropical members of the recently erected genus Neoprotoparmelia, Garima Singh and André Aptroot transferred the taxon to that genus and published it as a new species. The holotype was collected on live oak (Quercus) bark on Sapelo Island, Georgia; the specific epithet combines 'America' with 'isidiata', referring to the continent where it occurs and to the abundance of isidia on its surface. Phylogenetically the species belongs to the subfamily Protoparmelioideae of the large lichen family Parmeliaceae, but it differs from the arctic-temperate genus Protoparmelia by its tropical affinity, branched paraphyses and production of alectoronic acid-type compounds.

Morphologically, N. amerisidiata is most similar to the neotropical N. brasilisidiata. It is distinguished by having stouter isidia (0.07–0.11 mm wide versus mostly ≤0.08 mm) and by its restricted distribution in the southeastern United States. No apothecia have been seen, so the description rests on vegetative characters, chemistry and DNA barcodes (ITS and mtSSU). The absence of apothecia is typical of several isidiate species in the genus and does not affect placement because ascus characters are known from related taxa.

== Description ==
The lichen forms a thin (<0.05 mm), smooth crust (thallus) that ranges from pale olive-green to gray-olive. Across the thallus rise countless isidia—tiny, finger-like outgrowths that function as ready-made propagules containing both fungal and algal partners. These isidia are initially scattered but soon carpet most of the surface; they are cylindrical, slightly knobbly, 0.07–0.11 mm in diameter and can reach 1.5 mm long. Their tips turn a dull brown with age, giving the colony a peppered look. A narrow brown prothallus (the colonizing hyphal fringe) may be visible at the margins, but otherwise the lichen adheres closely to the bark and lacks any leafy lobes. No spore-producing cups (apothecia) or slime-bearing pycnidia have been observed in this species.

In spot tests the inner layer (medulla) glows bright green-white under ultraviolet light and gives a pink flash when potassium hydroxide is followed by calcium hypochlorite (the KC test). These reactions signal the presence of alectoronic acid, the principal secondary metabolite confirmed by thin-layer chromatography; minor traces of dehydro- and β-alectoronic acids are also detected. Such chemical fingerprints, together with the coarse isidia and the absence of apothecia, allow field workers to separate N. amerisidiata from superficially similar gray crusts.

== Habitat and distribution ==
Neoprotoparmelia amerisidiata is so far known only from the humid, warm-temperate coastal plain of the southeastern United States, with records from North Carolina southward to Florida and west to Mississippi and Alabama. It colonizes the bark of hardwoods in mixed forests and maritime hammocks, often sharing trunks with mosses and other bark-dwelling (corticolous) lichens. Field observations suggest it favors lightly shaded, well-ventilated sites where the bark remains periodically moist but not continuously wet—conditions typical of mature live oaks and other broad-leaved trees near the coast.

Although considered endemic to the region, the species may be under-recorded because its minute size and lack of fruiting bodies make it easy to overlook. Continued survey work in similar habitats across the Caribbean and Gulf Coastal Plain will help clarify its true range and conservation status.
