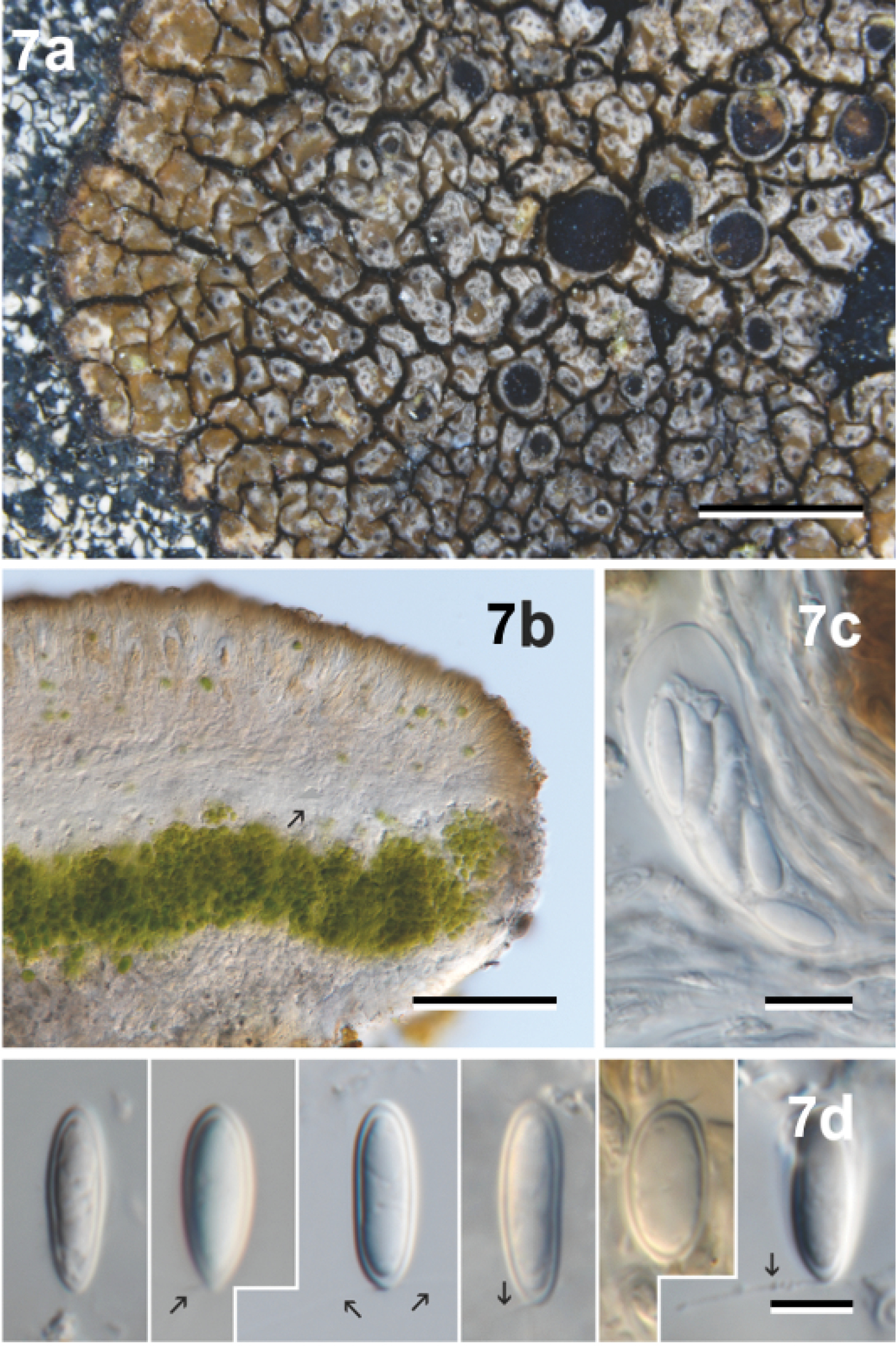
- Image of holotype specimen, showing a) habit b) section through centre of apothecium, showing cup-shaped proper exciple (arrow) c) ascus d) spores, showing setae (arrow). Scale bars: 2 mm (a), 100 μm (b), 10 μm (c), 5 μm (d).

Scientific classification
- Kingdom: Fungi
- Division: Ascomycota
- Class: Lecanoromycetes
- Order: Lecanorales
- Family: Parmeliaceae
- Genus: Neoprotoparmelia
- Species: N. capensis

Binomial name
- Neoprotoparmelia capensis V.J.Rico, A.Crespo & Garima Singh (2018)
- Holotype: Western Cape, South Africa

= Neoprotoparmelia capensis =

Species of lichen

Neoprotoparmelia capensis is a species of saxicolous (rock-dwelling), crustose lichen in the family Parmeliaceae. Found in South Africa, it was formally described as a new species in 2018 by Víctor Jiménez Rico, Ana Crespo, and Garima Singh. The type specimen was collected between Papendorp and Strandfontein (Western Cape Province); the specific epithet refers to the province in which it was discovered. The lichen is only known from the type locality, a karoo biome with many succulent plants; it grows on exposed sandstone, forming thin, light grey to pale to strong brown and areolate crusts up to 8 cm (3 in) in diameter.

== Taxonomy ==
Neoprotoparmelia capensis was one of eight new species introduced in 2018 during a DNA barcode–driven revision of the tropical and subtropical members of the Parmeliaceae subfamily Protoparmelioideae. Garima Singh, Ana Crespo and colleagues recognised that several South-African collections, long referred to informally as "Protoparmelia sp. ZA", formed a well-supported lineage separate from all other described taxa and therefore warranted formal recognition. The holotype was gathered on 4 February 2005 from sandstone outcrops between Papendorp and Strandfontein in the Western Cape and is housed in the Madrid herbarium. The specific epithet, capensis, refers to its occurrence in the Cape Region.

Although the species looks rather like the Northern-Hemisphere Protoparmelia montagnei complex, multilocus phylogenies place it firmly within Neoprotoparmelia and far from Protoparmelia. Chemically it is also distinct: N. capensis contains alectoronic-acid–type depsidones, whereas P. montagnei produces lobaric, gyrophoric or fatty acids. These morphological, chemical and molecular characters together confirm N. capensis as an independent evolutionary lineage.

== Description ==
The lichen is saxicolous (rock-dwelling) and forms a grey to pale- or dark-brown crust up to about 8 cm across. Young parts are thin and neatly areolate—broken into tiny polygonal patches—while older areas become warted or partly squamulose and may reach 2.2 mm thick. A locally gelatinised outer layer often gives the surface a whitish mottled, fissured aspect. The thallus may be bordered by a narrow black hypothallus line, but this is sometimes absent.

Apothecia (the spore-producing cups) are frequent, one to several per areole. When young they are immersed and urn-shaped; with age they expand to more or less sessile discs up to 2 mm wide whose brown to almost black centre is surrounded by a persistent, thallus-coloured rim. Internally, the proper exciple is cup-shaped and richly gelatinised; the hymenium is 60–75 μm tall, with branched paraphyses whose tips are sheathed in brown mucilage. Eight-spored asci measure 42–70 × 12–20 μm and are of the Lecanora-type. Colourless, single-celled ascospores are fusiform to narrowly ellipsoid, 9–14 × 3.5–6 μm, a few bearing a tiny hyaline hair at one end. Immersed pycnidia are common; they release straight, rod-shaped conidia 7–17 × 1–1.5 μm. Spot tests give KC+ (dirty rose-red) and UV+ (green-white) reactions, and thin-layer chromatography shows alectoronic acid as the major secondary metabolite with traces of its derivatives; atranorin is present only in vestigial amounts.

== Habitat and distribution ==
Neoprotoparmelia capensis is known solely from its type locality in the arid north-western Cape Region of South Africa, within the succulent Karoo biome. It grows on exposed coastal sandstones only a few metres above sea level, where fog and salt-laden winds alternate with intense sunshine. The lichen shares its habitat with a diversity of drought-adapted succulents, but no other populations have yet been discovered despite targeted searches, suggesting that the species may be a Cape endemic with an extremely restricted range.
