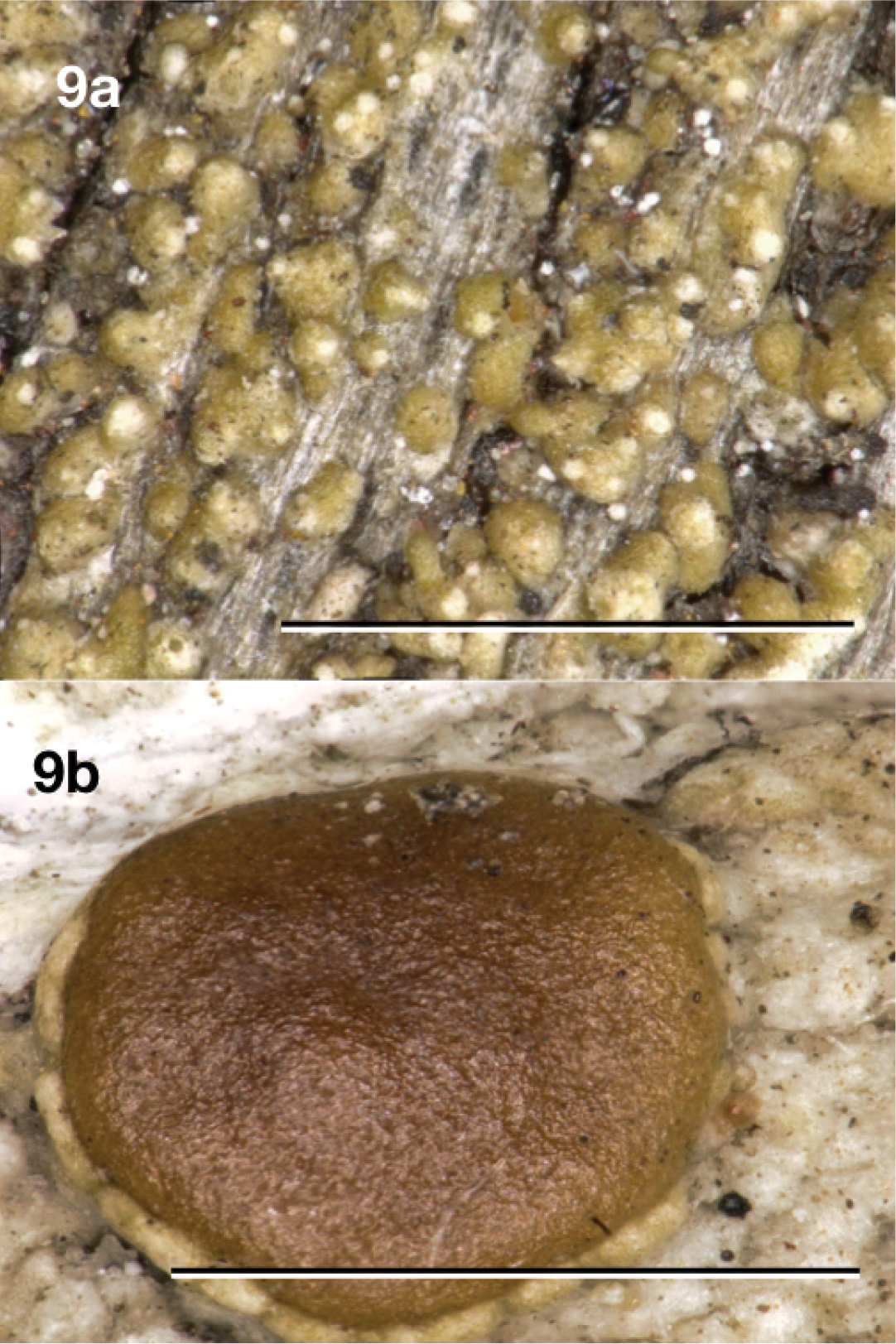
- Scale bar = 1 mm

Scientific classification
- Domain: Eukaryota
- Kingdom: Fungi
- Division: Ascomycota
- Class: Lecanoromycetes
- Order: Lecanorales
- Family: Parmeliaceae
- Genus: Neoprotoparmelia
- Species: N. crassa

Binomial name
- Neoprotoparmelia crassa Garima Singh & Aptroot (2018)

= Neoprotoparmelia crassa =

Species of lichen

Neoprotoparmelia crassa is a species of crustose lichen in the family Parmeliaceae. Found in Australia, it was formally described as a new species in 2018 by Garima Singh and André Aptroot. The type specimen was collected by John Elix in Solar Village (Australian Capital Territory). It is only known to occur here and in Northern Territory, where it grows on the bark and wood of trees in open and closed forests. It contains alectoronic acid, a secondary chemical. The specific epithet crassa, derived from the Latin crassus ("fat") refers to the thickness of its thallus (measuring up to 0.1 mm), which is greater than the other isidiate members of genus Neoprotoparmelia.
