= Neoprotoparmelia capitata =

Scientific classification
- Kingdom: Fungi
- Division: Ascomycota
- Class: Lecanoromycetes
- Order: Lecanorales
- Family: Parmeliaceae
- Genus: Neoprotoparmelia
- Species: N. capitata

Binomial name
- Neoprotoparmelia capitata (Lendemer) Garima Singh, Lumbsch & I.Schmitt (2018)

Synonyms
- Protoparmelia capitata Lendemer (2008); Maronina capitata (Lendemer) Divakar, A.Crespo & Lumbsch (2017)

Species of lichen

Neoprotoparmelia capitata is a species of corticolous (bark-dwelling) and crustose lichen in the family Parmeliaceae. It is found in eastern North America.

== Taxonomy ==
The lichen was first formally described by lichenologist James Lendemer in 2008, as a species of Protoparmelia. The type specimen was collected by Richard C. Harris near Archbold Biological Station in Florida, where it was found growing on Carya floridana in scrubland. The specific epithet capitata refers to the characteristic large convex hemispherical soralia. The species was moved to genus Maronina in 2017. In 2018, the taxon was transferred to Neoprotoparmelia, a genus newly circumscribed to contain a group of former Maronina species that had been previously recognized as an independent lineage.

== Description ==
Neoprotoparmelia capitata has a grey to greyish-brown, shiny and smooth to cracked crustose thallus. It often has a dark prothallus (visible as a line around the thallus margin). Soredia typically measure between 16 and 29 μm in diameter; they tend to clump together to form larger head-like ("capitate") soralia that are 0.8–1.25 mm in diameter, and 0.5–0.8 mm tall. Apothecia are rare, and pycnidia are not present. In its medulla, the lichen contains the secondary compounds alectoronic acid and traces of α-collatolic acid

== Habitat and distribution ==
Neoprotoparmelia capitata grows on the bark of hardwood trees in regions of the coastal plain of eastern North America. It tends to grows in subtropical areas, and at the time of its original publication, had been recorded from Alabama, Georgia, and Florida.
