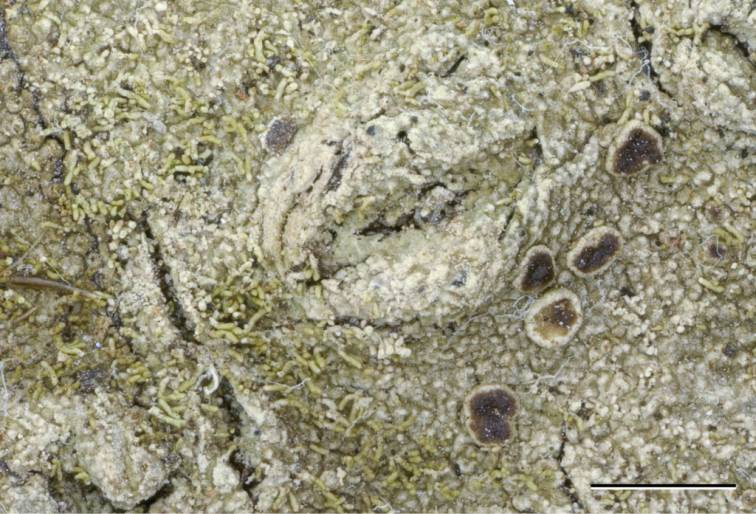
- Neoprotoparmelia corallifera; scale bar is 1 mm

Scientific classification
- Kingdom: Fungi
- Division: Ascomycota
- Class: Lecanoromycetes
- Order: Lecanorales
- Family: Parmeliaceae
- Genus: Neoprotoparmelia; Garima Singh, Lumbsch & I.Schmitt (2018)

Type species
- Neoprotoparmelia corallifera (Kantvilas & Papong) Garima Singh, Lumbsch & I.Schmitt (2018)

= Neoprotoparmelia =

Genus of fungi

Neoprotoparmelia is a genus of crustose lichens that was created in 2018. It contains 24 tropical and subtropical species that mostly grow on bark. Neoprotoparmelia is in the subfamily Protoparmelioideae of the family Parmeliaceae, along with the morphologically similar genera Protoparmelia and Maronina.

== Taxonomy ==
Neoprotoparmelia was circumscribed in 2018 by lichenologists Garima Singh, H. Thorsten Lumbsch, and Imke Schmitt. Its species were formerly placed in Maronina, a genus with a somewhat controversial taxonomic status prior to the advent of modern molecular phylogenetics. Maronina was created in 1990 to contain two species with multispored asci: M. multifera, and the type species, Maronina australiensis. Based on a similarity of ascus characters in Maronina and Protoparmelia, the authors suggested a close relationship between the two, considering Maronina a multispored derivative of Protoparmelia. Later, molecular data confirmed the close phylogenetic relationship between Maronina with Protoparmelia and the former was subsumed into the latter.

In 2017, Kraichak and colleagues proposed the use of a temporal banding approach for a consistent classification of taxa at higher taxonomic levels (at family and genus level) for lichen-forming fungi. This approach identifies a divergence time of about 102–112 Ma for families and 29–33 Ma for genera. Because the divergence between Maronina and Protoparmelia is estimated to have occurred about 70 Ma, the genus Maronina was resurrected for use.

Molecular analysis revealed that the type species of Maronina, M. australiensis, is sister to a clade containing Protoparmelia and Maronina, demonstrating the circumscription of Maronina to be polyphyletic. To resolve this, Singh and colleagues proposed restricting Maronina to two Australian species (M. australiensis and M. hesperia), and created Neoprotoparmelia to contain the former Maronina species. These species had been previously recognized as an independent lineage, and termed the "tropical Protoparmelia clade" in a prior phylogenetic analysis. Neoprotoparmelia originally contained 14 species – eight newly described and six new combinations, including the type species, N. corallifera. Two new combinations and six new species (mostly from Brazil) were added to the genus in 2019. Neoprotoparmelia, Protoparmelia, and Maronina are all part of the subfamily Protoparmelioideae in the family Parmeliaceae.

The genus name combines the Greek νέος (néos, meaning "new") with Protoparmelia, alluding to its close relationship with that genus.

== Description ==
Neoprotoparmelia has a crustose thallus. Its apothecia are lecanorine, and are broadly adnate to sessile, with a distinct thalline margin. The proper margin (referring to an apothecial margin lacking algae and derived from apothecial tissue) is cup-shaped (cupulate), and translucent (hyaline). The asci are eight-spored to multispored, club-shaped (clavate), and variations of the Lecanora-type. The paraphyses are sparingly branched and anastomosing with tips that are clavate and brown-pigmented. Ascospores range in shape from ellipsoid to fusiform (spindle-shaped) to elongated, and are not surrounded by a transparent coat (non-halonate). Pycnidia are immersed and spherical. The conidia have a bacilliform shape.

Neoprotoparmelia species mainly produce depsidones of the alectoronic acid chemosyndrome, including dehydroalectoronic acid and β-alectoronic acid .

Neoprotoparmelia is morphologically similar to Maronina but can be distinguished by containing depsidones instead of depsides as found in Maronina; additionally Maronina has branched paraphyses. Neoprotoparmelia is also morphologically similar to Protoparmelia.

== Habitat and distribution ==
Neoprotoparmelia lichens occur in open habitats. Mostly species grow on bark, although a few species are saxicolous on siliceous rock. The genus has a pantropical distribution and has been recorded from Australia, Brazil, Kenya, Papua New Guinea, South Africa, Thailand, and south-eastern USA.

== Species ==
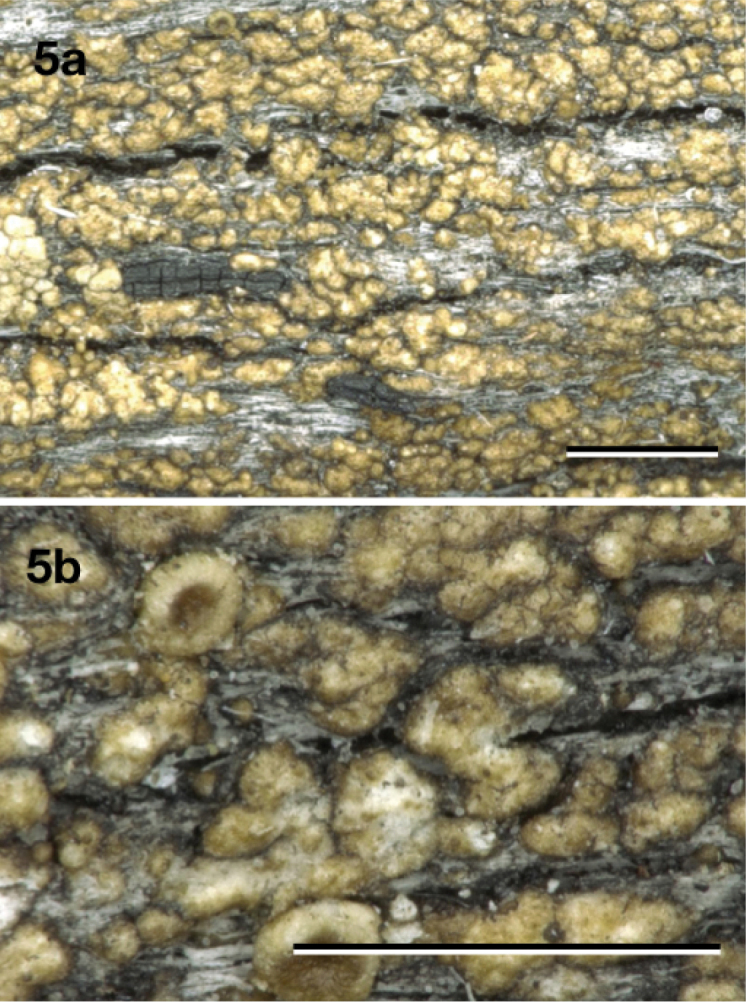
Neoprotoparmelia australisidiata; scale bar=1 mm

As of September 2022, Index Fungorum accepts 24 species of Neoprotoparmelia.

- Neoprotoparmelia amerisidiata Garima Singh & Aptroot (2018) – southeastern USA
- Neoprotoparmelia australisidiata Garima Singh & Aptroot (2018) – Australia
- Neoprotoparmelia brasilisidiata Garima Singh, M.Cáceres & Aptroot (2018) – South and Central tropical America
- Neoprotoparmelia camptotheca (Fée) L.A.Santos & Lücking (2019) – Brazil
- Neoprotoparmelia capensis V.J.Rico, A. Crespo & Garima Singh (2018) – South Africa
- Neoprotoparmelia capitata (Lendemer) Garima Singh, Lumbsch & I.Schmitt (2018) – Brazil; USA
- Neoprotoparmelia corallifera (Kantvilas & Papong) Garima Singh, Lumbsch & I.Schmitt (2018) – Thailand
- Neoprotoparmelia crassa Garima Singh & Aptroot (2018) – Australia
- Neoprotoparmelia fuscosorediata Kalb & Aptroot (2021) – Kenya
- Neoprotoparmelia isidiata (Diederich, Aptroot & Sérus.) Garima Singh, Lumbsch & I.Schmitt (2018) – Papua New Guinea
- Neoprotoparmelia multifera (Nyl.) Garima Singh, Lumbsch & I.Schmitt (2018) – South America
- Neoprotoparmelia nigra L.A.Santos, Lücking & Aptroot (2019) – Brazil
- Neoprotoparmelia orientalis (Kantvilas & Papong) Garima Singh, Lumbsch & I.Schmitt (2018) – Thailand
- Neoprotoparmelia paramultifera L.A.Santos, M.Cáceres & Aptroot (2019) – Brazil
- Neoprotoparmelia paulii V.J.Rico, Lumbsch & Garima Singh (2018) – Kenya
- Neoprotoparmelia plurisporibadia Garima Singh, M.Cáceres & Aptroot (2018) – Brazil
- Neoprotoparmelia pseudomultifera L.A.Santos, Lücking & Aptroot (2019) – Brazil
- Neoprotoparmelia pulchra (Diederich, Aptroot & Sérus.) Garima Singh, Lumbsch & I.Schmitt (2018) – Papua New Guinea
- Neoprotoparmelia purpurea L.A.Santos, Lücking & Aptroot (2019) – Brazil
- Neoprotoparmelia rogersii (Elix) Sipman (2019) – Australia
- Neoprotoparmelia rubrofusca Lücking & L.A.Santos (2019) – Colombia
- Neoprotoparmelia saxicola (Aptroot & M.Cáceres) L.A.Santos, M.Cáceres & Aptroot (2019) – Brazil
- Neoprotoparmelia sexdecimspora L.A.Santos, M.Cáceres & Aptroot (2019) – Brazil
- Neoprotoparmelia siamisidiata Garima Singh & Aptroot (2018) – Thailand
