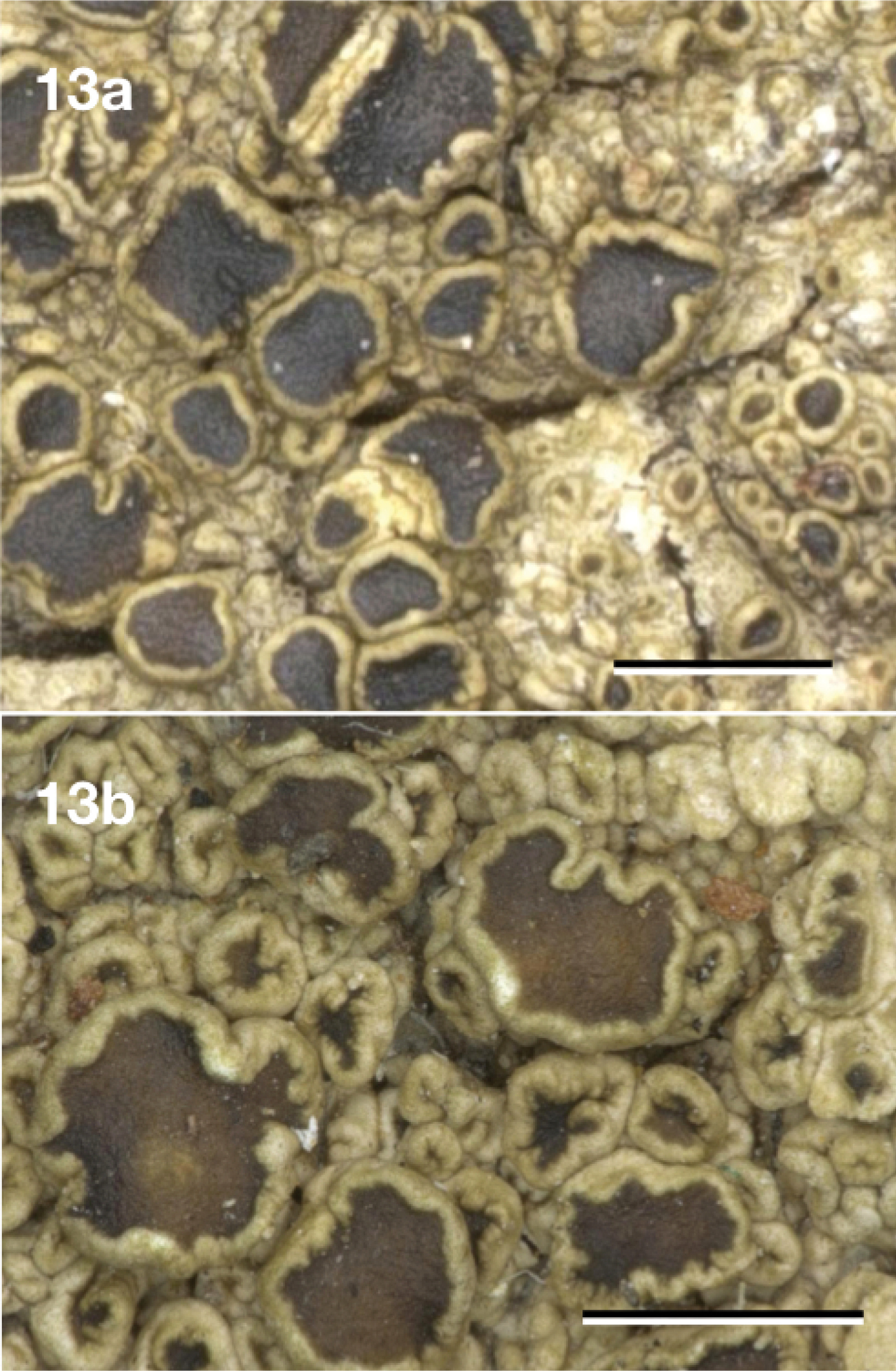
- scale bar = 1 mm

Scientific classification
- Domain: Eukaryota
- Kingdom: Fungi
- Division: Ascomycota
- Class: Lecanoromycetes
- Order: Lecanorales
- Family: Parmeliaceae
- Genus: Neoprotoparmelia
- Species: N. siamisidiata

Binomial name
- Neoprotoparmelia siamisidiata Garima Singh & Aptroot (2018)

= Neoprotoparmelia siamisidiata =

Species of lichen

Neoprotoparmelia siamisidiata is a species of corticolous (bark-dwelling) and crustose lichen in the family Parmeliaceae. Found in Thailand, it was formally described as a new species in 2018 by Garima Singh and André Aptroot. The type specimen was collected by Harrie Sipman in the Medicinal Garden of Doi Suthep–Pui National Park (Chiang Mai) at an altitude of about 1,100 m (3,600 ft); here it was found growing on the bark of Cinchona pubescens. The specific epithet refers to its type locality (biology) (Siam is a historical name for Thailand) and the presence of isidia.

The asci of this species contain 16 ascospores; this feature helps to distinguish this lichen from the lookalike N. brasilisidiata. secondary compounds that occur in N. siamisidiata, detectable using the technique thin-layer chromatography, include alectoronic acid (major), and minor to trace amounts of dehydroalectoronic acid and β-alectoronic acid.
