= Neoprotoparmelia fuscosorediata =

Scientific classification
- Domain: Eukaryota
- Kingdom: Fungi
- Division: Ascomycota
- Class: Lecanoromycetes
- Order: Lecanorales
- Family: Parmeliaceae
- Genus: Neoprotoparmelia
- Species: N. fuscosorediata

Binomial name
- Neoprotoparmelia fuscosorediata Kalb & Aptroot (2021)

Species of lichen

Neoprotoparmelia fuscosorediata is a species of crustose lichen in the family Parmeliaceae. Found in Kenya, it was described as a new species in 2021 by lichenologists Klaus Kalb and André Aptroot. The type specimen was collected in the Nanyuki district of Central Province, where it was found growing on wood in a savannah, at an altitude of 2,050 m (6,730 ft). The specific epithet fuscosorediata refers to the colour of the soredia, which are pale brown to pale ochraceous.

== Description ==
Neoprotoparmelia fuscosorediata forms a smooth, shiny crust (thallus) that is pale brown and extremely thin—usually no more than 0.05–0.1 mm thick. A narrow, black prothallus line (about 0.1–0.2 mm wide) rings the colony where it expands across the rock or bark. Most of the surface is obscured by soredia, which are powder-fine bundles of fungal and algal cells that serve as ready-made propagules. These originate in tiny pin-prick openings; as they enlarge the openings become rounded pits or shallow cushions (soralia) up to 0.5 mm in diameter, yet they remain separate from one another. The soredia are initially pale ochre to light brown but often darken at the outer edge of each soralium, giving the crust a speckled appearance. The photosynthetic partner is a green alga with globose cells 5–12 μm in diameter.

Fruiting bodies (apothecia) are common in N fuscosorediata. They sit on the surface but are markedly constricted at the base, giving them a top-shaped to almost stalked outline 0.2–2 mm across. The disc is glossy brown and begins flat before becoming slightly concave; it is framed by a dull, pale-brown margin that is always taller than the disc and often fissured. In section, the cup-shaped outer wall (excipulum) is pale pink-brown externally because it is impregnated with crystalline secondary metabolites, but internally it is colourless and threaded with algal cells. The spore-bearing layer (hymenium) is about 125 μm high, topped by a brown epihymenium. Each ascus contains eight colourless, single-celled ascospores that are narrowly ellipsoid with somewhat pointed ends, measuring 9–11 × 4.5–5.5 μm. No asexual pycnidia have been observed. A simple spot test shows the inner white layer (medulla) reacts to the KC reagent, confirming the presence of alectoronic acid–type substances that characterise several members of the genus.
