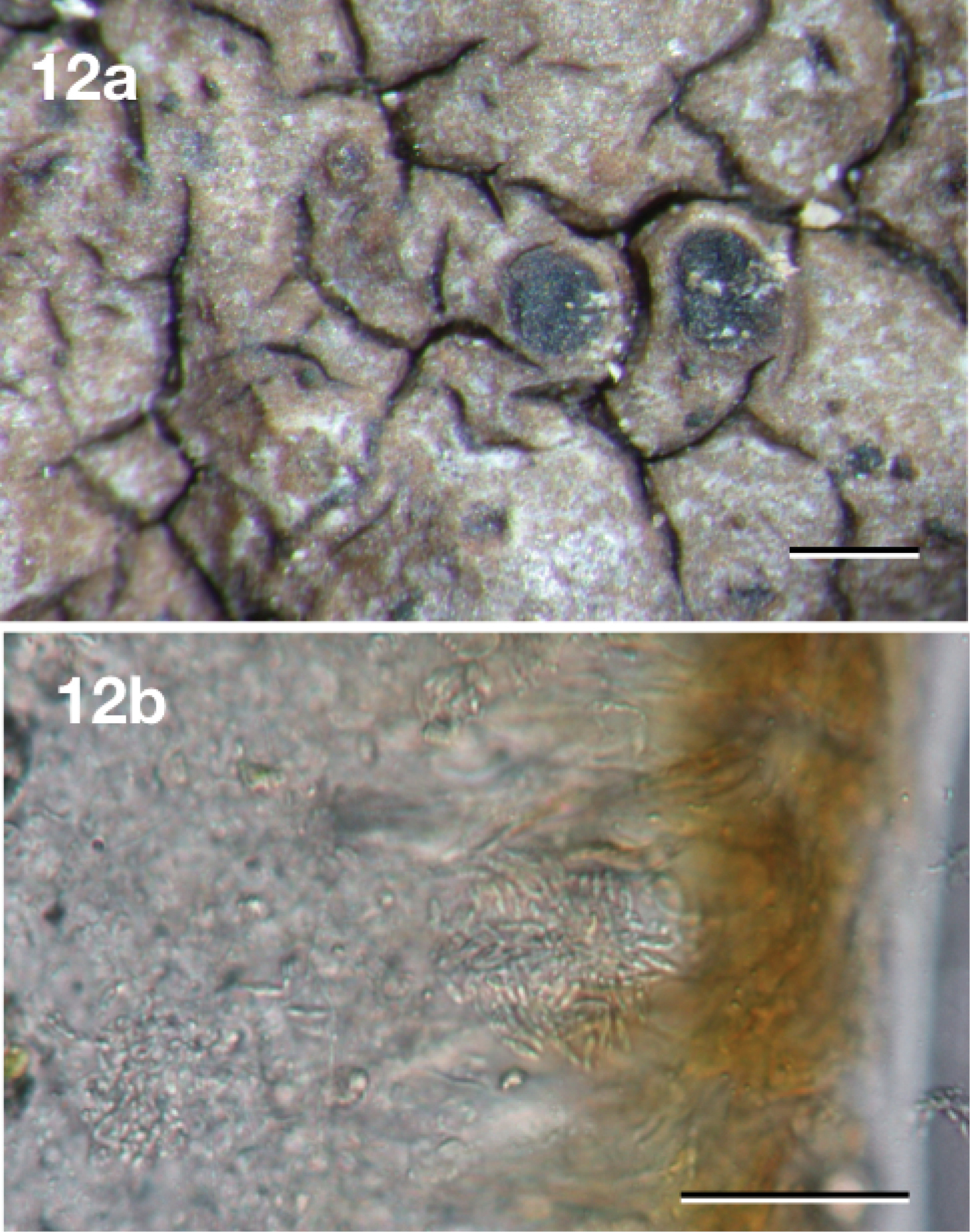
- Image of holotype specimen, showing a) habit and b) an ascus with ascospores. Scale bars: 1 mm (a), 10 µm (b)

Scientific classification
- Domain: Eukaryota
- Kingdom: Fungi
- Division: Ascomycota
- Class: Lecanoromycetes
- Order: Lecanorales
- Family: Parmeliaceae
- Genus: Neoprotoparmelia
- Species: N. plurisporibadia

Binomial name
- Neoprotoparmelia plurisporibadia Garima Singh, M.Cáceres & Aptroot (2018)

= Neoprotoparmelia plurisporibadia =

Species of lichen

Neoprotoparmelia plurisporibadia is a species of saxicolous (rock-dwelling), crustose lichen in the family Parmeliaceae. It is found in Rio Grande do Sul, Brazil, where it grows on granite rocks in low, open mountainous areas.

== Taxonomy ==
Neoprotoparmelia plurisporibadia was formally described as a new species in 2018 by Garima Singh, Marcela Eugenia da Silva Cáceres, and André Aptroot. The type specimen was collected by Cáceres and Aptroot near Itapuã State Park (Rio Grande do Sul) at an altitude of about 100 m (330 ft). Here, in this low open mountain area, it grows on granite rocks. The specific epithet plurisporibadia refers to its multispored asci (pluri, "many"; spori, "spores") and to the colour brown (badia, "dark brown").

== Description ==
The lichen has a light brown to dark brown, areolate thallus, with a thin (or absent) black prothallus around the margin. The apothecia are round (later becoming compressed), measuring 0.4–1.3 mm in diameter, with a smooth, glossy, dark brown disc. The asci (spore-producing structures) are 95 by 15 μm, and they contain about 50 spores. The ascospores measure 7.0–8.0 by 2.5–3.5 μm. Neoprotoparmelia plurisporibadia contains alectoronic acid, a secondary compound that can be detected using the technique thin-layer chromatography.
