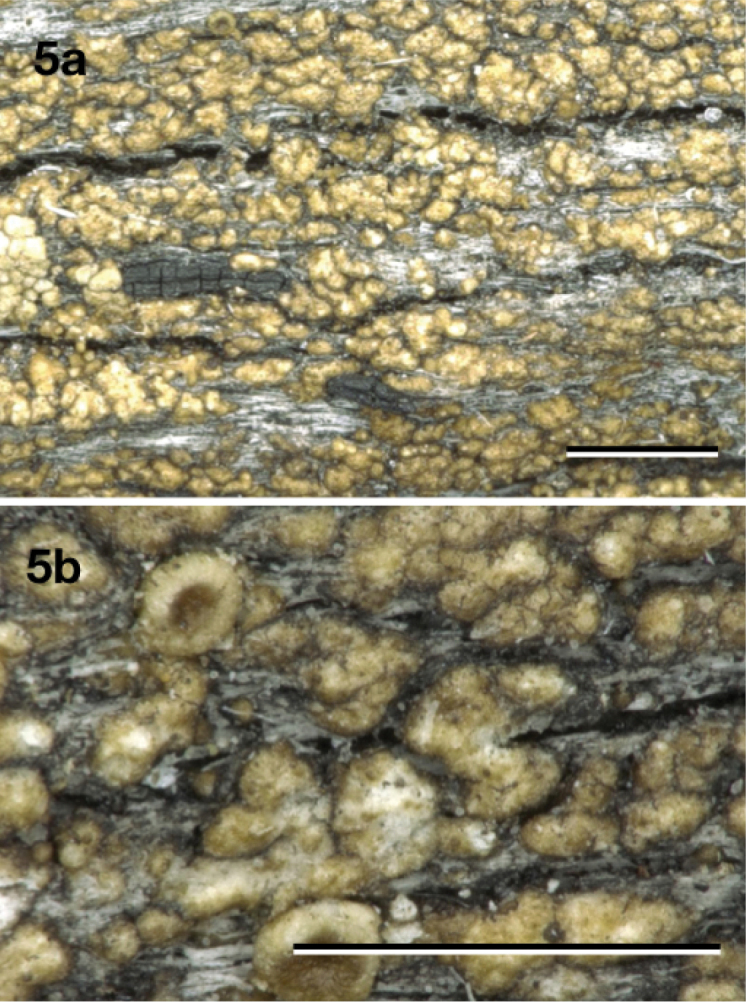
- Image of holotype specimen; scale bar = 1 mm

Scientific classification
- Kingdom: Fungi
- Division: Ascomycota
- Class: Lecanoromycetes
- Order: Lecanorales
- Family: Parmeliaceae
- Genus: Neoprotoparmelia
- Species: N. australisidiata

Binomial name
- Neoprotoparmelia australisidiata Garima Singh & Aptroot (2018)
- Holotype: Emerald Springs, Northern Territory

= Neoprotoparmelia australisidiata =

Species of lichen

Neoprotoparmelia australisidiata is a species of areolate lichen in the family Parmeliaceae. Found in Australia, it was formally described as a new species in 2018 by Garima Singh and André Aptroot. The type specimen was collected by Gintaras Kantvilas north of Emerald Springs (Northern Territory); here it was found growing on the wood or bark of a Cooktown ironwood tree. The lichen has also been recorded in New South Wales. The specific epithet refers both to its Australian distribution, and the presence of isidia. Secondary chemicals in the lichen that are detectable with thin-layer chromatography include alectoronic acid (major), and minor to trace amounts of dehydroalectoronic acid and β–alectoronic acid.

== Taxonomy ==
Neoprotoparmelia australisidiata was described as a new species in 2018 by Garima Singh and André Aptroot during their revision of tropical and subtropical members of the family Parmeliaceae. The holotype was collected on ironwood (Erythrophloeum chlorostachys) bark 2 km north of Emerald Springs, Northern Territory on 22 September 2007 and is held in the Tasmanian Herbarium. The authors assigned the species to the newly erected genus Neoprotoparmelia after molecular analyses showed that several Australian collections previously lumped under the widespread Protoparmelia isidiata formed a distinct, well-supported lineage within the subfamily Protoparmelioideae; the combination of DNA barcodes and phenotypical differences warranted specific rank and a new name. The epithet australisidiata acknowledges both its Australian provenance and the abundance of isidia on the thallus.

Morphologically the species is closest to the Papuan N. isidiata, but it can be separated by its broader, nearly contiguous areoles that usually carry several isidia each, rather than a single outgrowth. By comparing DNA sequences from six separate genetic loci, researchers confirmed that this organism is its own species and not just a distant look-alike of similar forms found elsewhere.

== Description ==
The lichen forms a crust of almost touching, flat to slightly convex areoles up to about 0.7 mm across and 0.1 mm thick. Surfaces are somewhat shiny and vary from pale brown to dark brown, occasionally showing olive-green or olive-grey tints; at the margins a thin black prothallus may be present but is often inconspicuous. Each areole carries clusters of minute, cylindrical isidia that remain 0.07–0.10 mm wide along their length and may reach 0.9 mm tall. These propagation bodies are frequently once, and sometimes repeatedly, branched and can appear knobbly; they share the thallus colour and do not develop darkened tips.

Fruiting bodies are rare and only immature apothecia have been seen: they are sessile, round, 0.4–0.6 mm in diameter, with a glossy orange-brown disc that is level to slightly concave. The narrow margin stands is slightly raised above the disc and has the same glossy brown colour. Internally, the spore-bearing layer (hymenium) is colourless and up to 50 μm high, while the supporting tissues are likewise hyaline; paraphyses are branched and slender, and mature asci and ascospores have yet to be observed. Chemical spot tests give KC+ (pink) and UV+ (greenish-white) reactions, indicating the presence of alectoronic acid (major), with dehydro- and β-alectoronic acids in minor to trace amounts, a profile typical for several members of the genus.

== Habitat and distribution ==
The species is corticolous, growing on the bark of hardwood trees in open or closed forest. Confirmed records are restricted to Australia, with collections from the Top End of the Northern Territory and from far-south coastal New South Wales. Field notes suggest it tolerates both seasonally dry tropical woodland and temperate sclerophyll forest, provided the substrate remains intermittently moist and exposed to filtered light.
