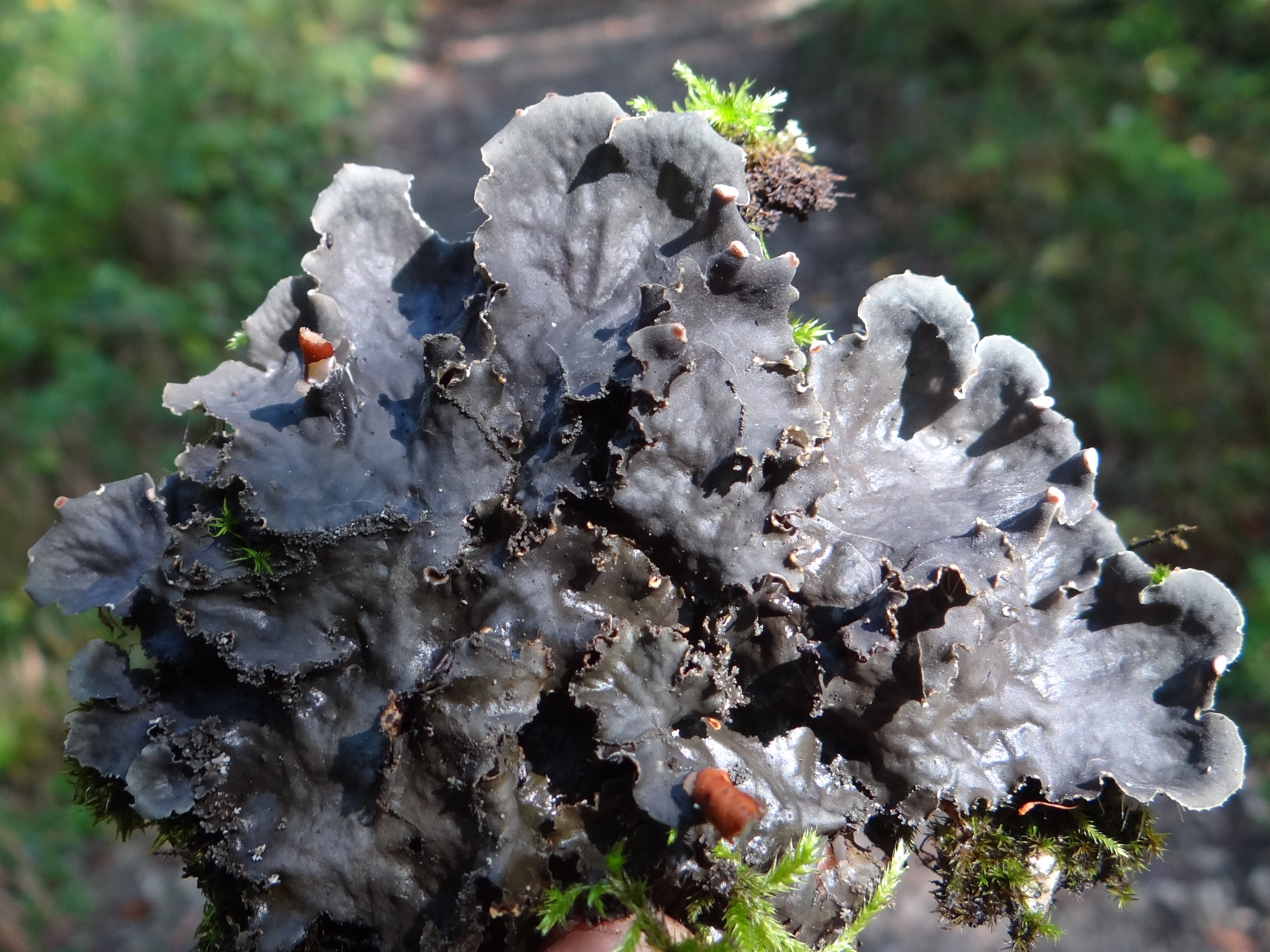
- Peltigera praetextata thallus

Conservation status
- Secure (NatureServe)

Scientific classification
- Kingdom: Fungi
- Division: Ascomycota
- Class: Lecanoromycetes
- Order: Peltigerales
- Family: Peltigeraceae
- Genus: Peltigera
- Species: P. praetextata

Binomial name
- Peltigera praetextata (Flörke ex Sommerf.) Zopf (1909)

Synonyms
- Peltidea ulorrhiza var. praetextata Flörke ex Sommerf. (1826)

= Peltigera praetextata =

Species of lichen

Peltigera praetextata, or the scaly dog pelt lichen, is a foliose lichen native to North America, Europe, and Asia. It is defined by small belly-button-like growths called phyllidia on its edges and centre.

== Characteristics ==
Peltigera praetextata has flat lobes up to 5 cm (2 in) long, and often forms circular growth patterns. It is dark green when wet, often with a reddish centre, and greyish when dry. It is tomentous, or covered with fine hairs. It does not reproduce vegetatively using isidia or soredia like most lichens, but using phyllidia. It is often fertile as well, with round to saddle-shaped red apothecial discs.

== Ecology ==
Although often found over moss or tree bark, P. praetextata may also be found on bare soil. It is common throughout temperate and boreal ecosystems.
