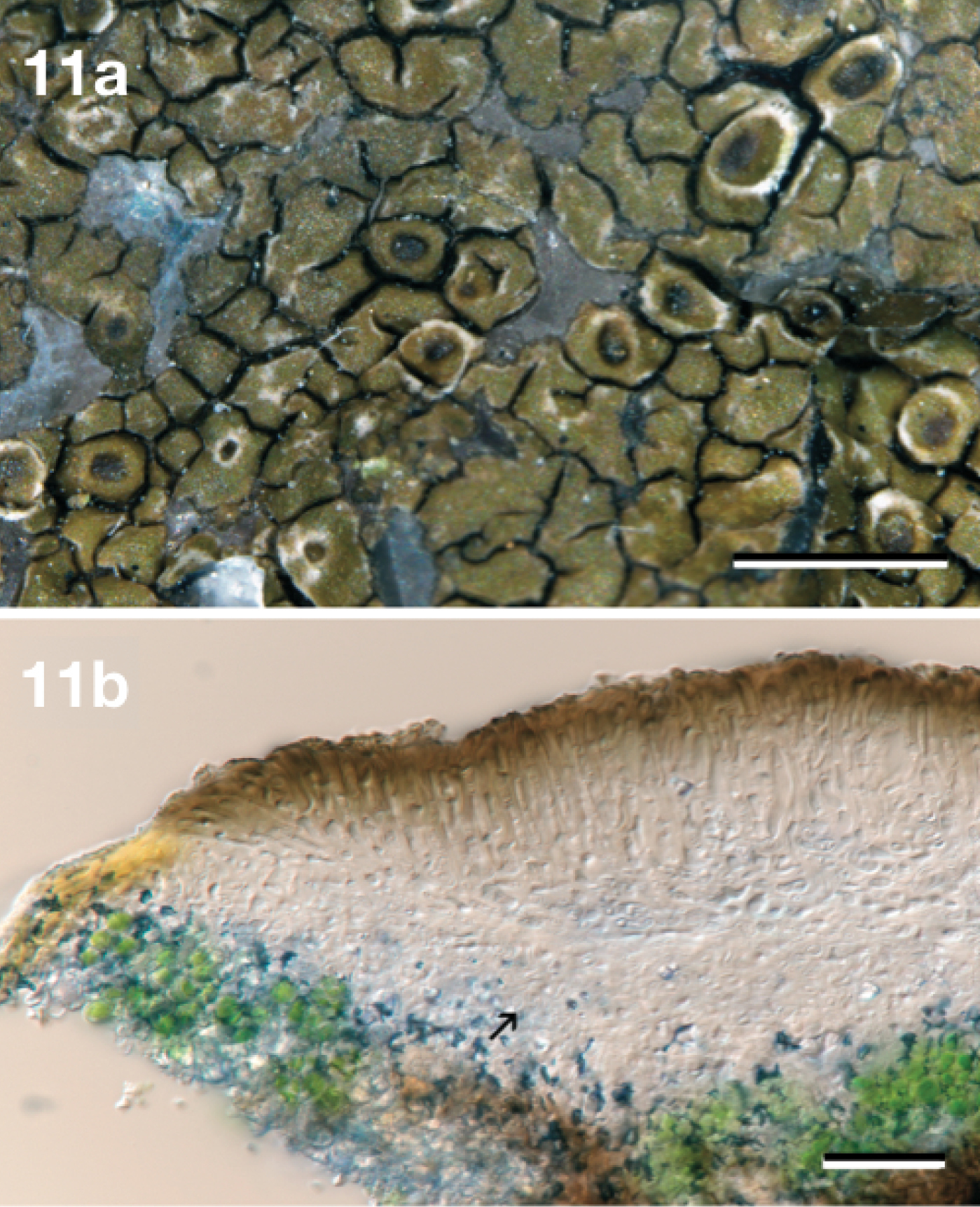
- Holotype specimen showing a) habit and b) a section of the apothecia; the arrow points to the proper exciple. Scale bars: 1 mm (a), 20 µm (b)

Scientific classification
- Domain: Eukaryota
- Kingdom: Fungi
- Division: Ascomycota
- Class: Lecanoromycetes
- Order: Lecanorales
- Family: Parmeliaceae
- Genus: Neoprotoparmelia
- Species: N. paulii

Binomial name
- Neoprotoparmelia paulii V.J.Rico, Lumbsch & Garima Singh (2018)

= Neoprotoparmelia paulii =

Species of lichen

Neoprotoparmelia paulii is a species of saxicolous (rock-dwelling), crustose lichen in the family Parmeliaceae. Found in Kenya, it was formally described as a new species in 2018 by Víctor Jiménez Rico, Helge Thorsten Lumbsch, and Garima Singh. The type specimen was collected in the Nuu Hills (former Mwingi District, Eastern Province) at an altitude of about 1,000 m (3,300 ft); here it was found growing on sandstone in an inselberg with dry woodland. The lichen is only known from the type locality, a montane ecosystem dominated by shrubs and trees from the genera Acacia, Combretum, and Terminalia. Neoprotoparmelia paulii contains several secondary compounds that can be detected using the technique thin-layer chromatography, including atranorin, α–collatolic acid, α–alectoronic acid, and traces of other chemically related substances. The specific epithet paulii honours Kenyan lichenologist Paul Kirika, who collected the type material along with Lumbsch.
