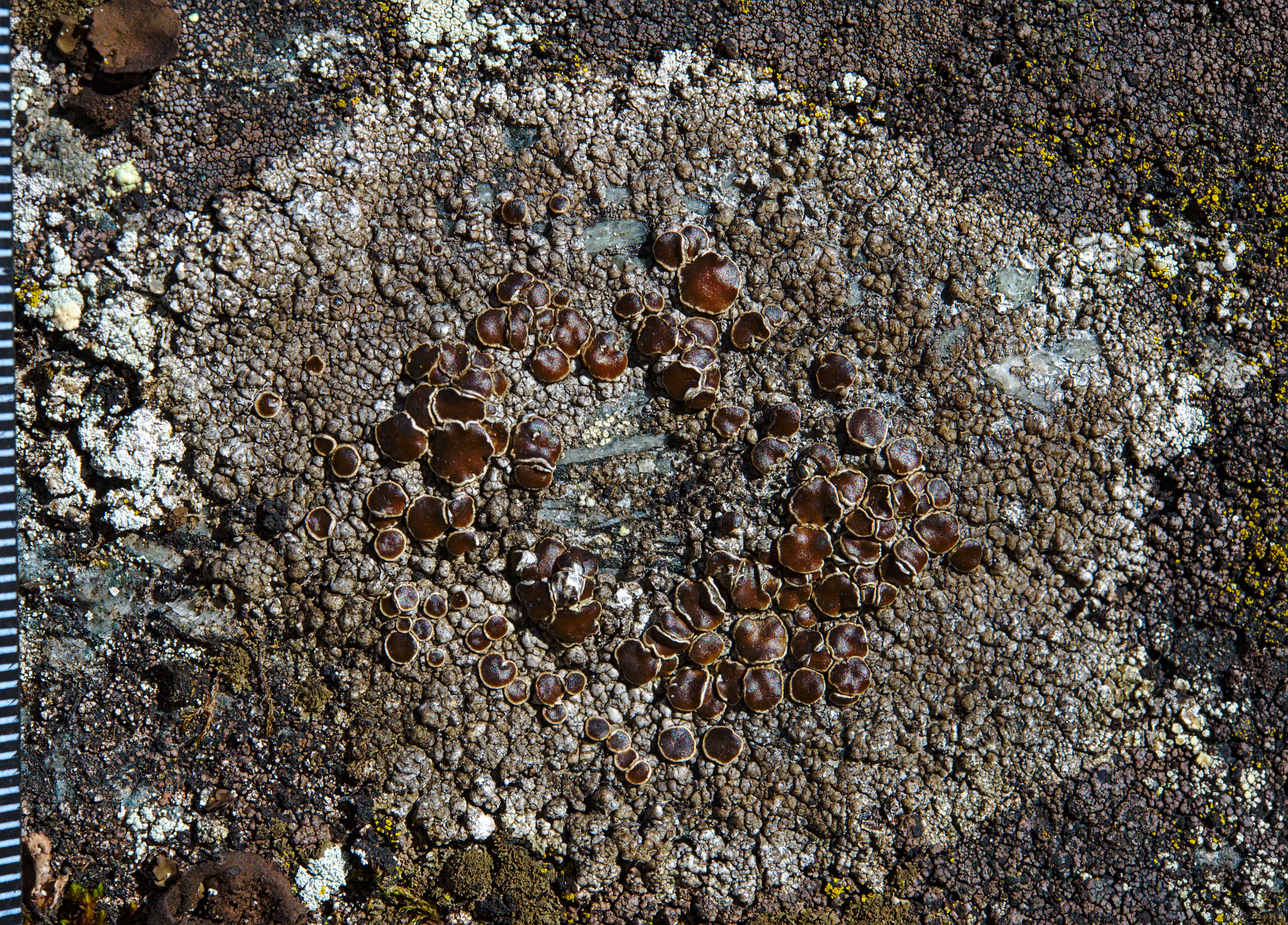

Conservation status
- Apparently Secure (NatureServe)

Scientific classification
- Kingdom: Fungi
- Division: Ascomycota
- Class: Lecanoromycetes
- Order: Lecanorales
- Family: Parmeliaceae
- Genus: Protoparmelia
- Species: P. badia

Binomial name
- Protoparmelia badia (Hoffm.) Hafellner (1984)

Synonyms
- Verrucaria badia Hoffm. (1796); Patellaria badia (Hoffm.) Hoffm. (1801); Lecidea picea (Dicks.) Ach. (1803); Lecanora badia (Hoffm.) Ach. (1810); Rinodina badia (Hoffm.) Gray (1821); Parmelia badia (Hoffm.) Hepp (1824); Solenopsora badia (Hoffm.) M.Choisy & Werner (1931)

= Protoparmelia badia =

Species of lichen

Protoparmelia badia is a species of crustose lichen in the family Parmeliaceae. It is a widely distributed, common species that grows on rocks.

== Taxonomy ==
The lichen was first formally described by German botanist Georg Franz Hoffmann in 1796, as Verrucaria badia. It has been shuffled between several genera in its taxonomic history, and has been associated with many synonyms. In 1986, Austrian lichenologist Josef Hafellner transferred it to the newly created genus Protoparmelia, in which it is the type species.

== Description ==
The thallus of Protoparmelia badia ranges in colour from pale to deep greyish-brown to yellowish brown. It has a texture that is areolate (a pattern of block-like areas similar to cracked dried mud) to verrucose (covered with wartlike projections), and is shiny. Its apothecia are lecanorine (shaped like a plate with a ring around them), and typically measure 0.7–1.5 mm in diameter. The discs are dark red-brown and shiny, while the smooth outer rim is paler. The spores made by this lichen are spindle-shaped (slightly pointed at both ends), measuring 10–16 by 3–7 μm.

== Habitat and distribution ==
Protoparmelia badia is a widespread and common lichen with a circumpolar and arctic-alpine distribution. It is found in western and northeastern North America, mountainous areas of Asia, Europe, temperate South America, Australasia, and Antarctica. It grows on hard, exposed acidic rocks, including granite, basalt and other volcanic rock, rhyolite, and sandstone.
