= Isidium =

Vegetative reproductive structure found in lichens

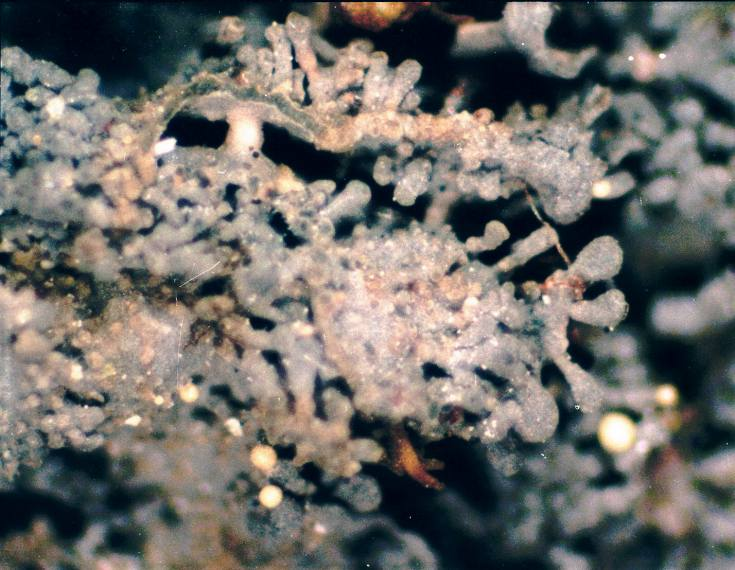
A herbarium specimen of the lichen Leptogium cyanescens, magnified 40X, with lobule-shaped isidia

An isidium (plural: isidia) is a tiny, wart- or finger-like outgrowth on the thallus surface of certain lichen species. It is one of two principal types of vegetative reproductive structures in lichens, the other being soredia. Each isidium contains both fungal and algal partners and is wrapped in a thin protective layer (the cortex), distinguishing it from soredia, which lack this covering. While both function in vegetative reproduction, the heavier, corticate structure of isidia means they tend to establish in microhabitats close to the parent thallus, often favouring stable, humid niches where mechanical protection improves survival. Unlike spores, which are microscopic and easily carried over long distances by wind, isidia are larger, multicellular fragments that rely on external forces such as wind, rain, or animal contact, but typically disperse over much shorter ranges. Isidia are morphologically diverse, ranging from spherical and cylindrical to club-shaped or scale-like, typically measuring 0.01–0.03 mm in diameter and 0.5–3.0 mm in height, and may be smooth, knobby, shiny, matt, or hollow.

Morphological characteristics of isidia are taxonomically informative, and often serve as distinguishing traits for species identification. Certain specialized forms, such as schizidia and thlasidia, reflect subtle developmental distinctions. Ecologically, isidia increase the thallus surface area, which enhances moisture retention, gas exchange, and photosynthetic capacity. Functionally, isidia act as vegetative propagules—units of asexual reproduction containing both symbiotic partners.

Lichenologists have recognized the importance of isidia for over two centuries, dating back to Erik Acharius in 1794. Features of isidia are reflected in the species epithets of many lichens, both indirectly and explicitly. Research has since expanded to explore their roles in ecological restoration, including lichen transplantation, as well as their contributions to ecosystem functions and symbiont dispersal networks. Modern molecular approaches have also begun investigating the genetic basis of isidium formation and its evolutionary significance.

== Morphology ==
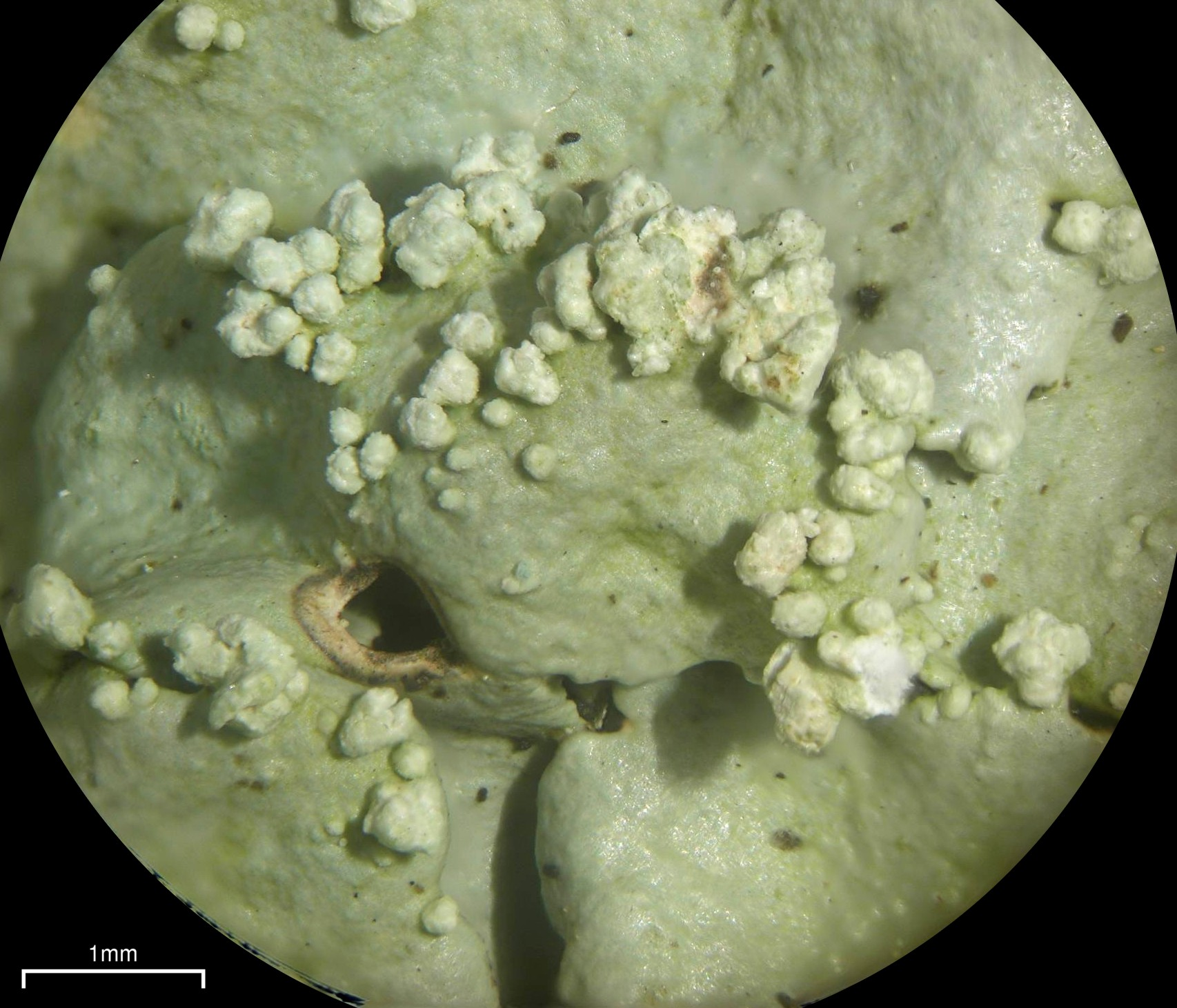
Closeup of the pustulate isidia that are characteristic of Flavoparmelia baltimorensis; scale bar = 1 mm

Isidia appear in various shapes, including spherical (globose), cylindrical, scale-like (squamulose), coral-like (coralloid), club-shaped (claviform), disc-shaped (disciform), cup-shaped (cupuliform), and wart-like (verruciform). Although they are always small (around 0.01–0.03 mm wide and up to 3 mm tall), their surface may be smooth or knobby, shiny or matt. Most isidia are solid, but some lichens feature hollow, inflated isidia. In some lichens, soralia—defined areas on the thallus where soredia are produced—and isidia can form in overlapping locations. Soralia may grow at the tips of isidia, and isidia can sometimes develop within a soralium, where the loose network becomes compact and forms a secondary cortex.

Some lichen species produce especially large, morphologically distinctive, or diagnostically important isidia that aid in species recognition. The isidia of the foliose (leafy) lichen Pseudocyphellaria horridula are distinct, emerging vertically from the lobes and growing up to 10 mm. These large isidia create a distinctive fish bone pattern on the lobes. Parmelina pastillifera also has distinctive isidia. This greyish foliose species has a central part with button-shaped, brown to black protuberances that have a flat or slightly concave, warty surface. These protuberances break off easily, leaving crater-shaped depressions, distinguishing P. pastillifera from P. tiliacea, which has smaller, globose to cylindrical black isidia on its older, central parts.

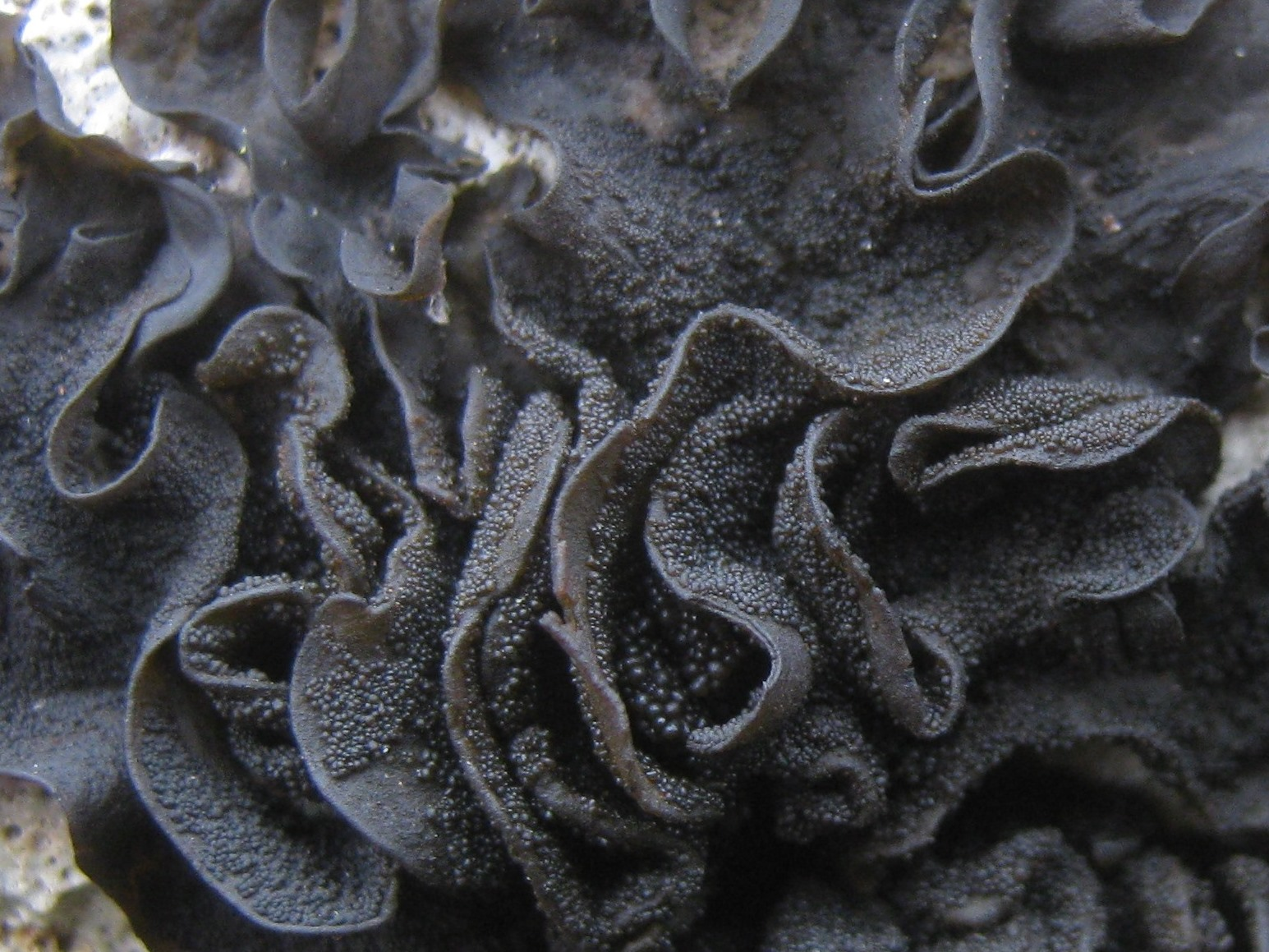
The gelatinous lichen Collema subflaccidum has prominent globular isidia.

Distinguishing isidia from other small bumps or outgrowths, such as warts (informally used for irregular surface protuberances) or papillae, can be difficult. Older isidia sometimes resemble tiny lobes (lobuli) or develop into hair-like strands. Some lichens transform their isidia into new structures without allowing them to detach, though only a few species actively release isidia by weakening the base. The isidia of many crustose lichens, like Pertusariaceae, detach easily, while others remain attached until the thallus dies. In many gelatinous and foliose lichens, the isidia stay attached to the thallus permanently, increasing the surface area.

Consoredia are clusters of incompletely separated soredia; soralia with many consoredia may be mistaken for isidia clusters. Sometimes, isidia may break down to soredia and consoredia. Species like Pertusaria coccodes may rarely produce both isidia and soredia. "Sorediate isidia" refers to isidia that erupt into soredia, typically at the tips. "Isidiate (or isidioid) soredia" describes soredia that look like isidia but lack a cortex and arise from distinct soralia. Gustaf Einar Du Rietz used "isidiate soredia" for the fragile isidia of Xanthoparmelia loxodes and X. verruculifera, but the term is inaccurate, as no soredia form. Soredial granules growing like isidia on the parent thallus are common in the family Physciaceae.

== Types and variations ==
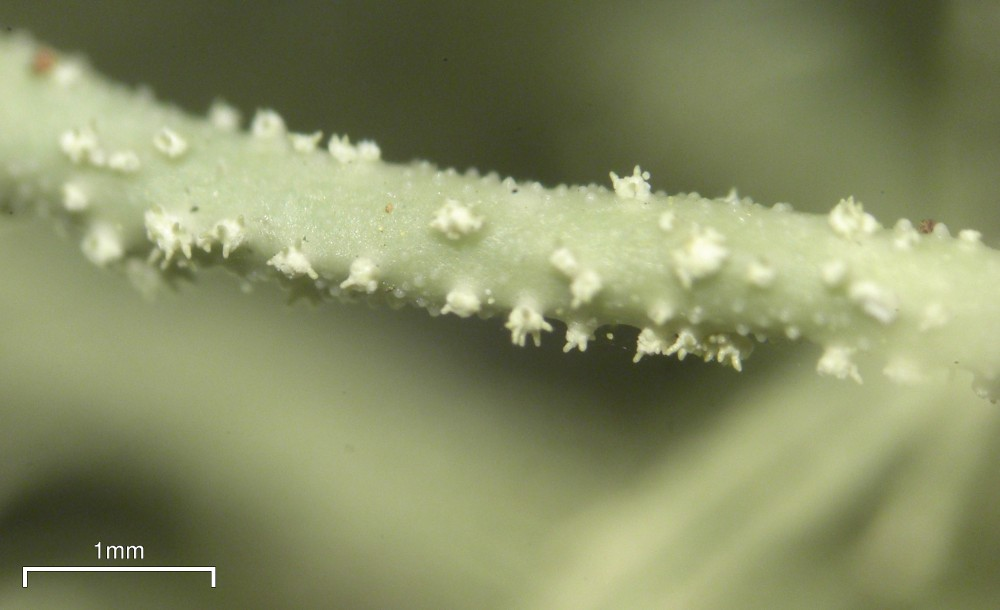
Isidia that occur on Usnea, such as these on the branch S. ceratina, are sometimes referred to as isidomorphs.

Isidia occur in a range of forms, each offering insights into lichen biology and taxonomy. In his 1992 monograph of the bark-dwelling, sorediate and isidiate crustose lichens of Norway, Tonsberg broadly defined isidia as "all globose to elongate, usually projecting, corticate diaspores with a basal point of attachment", and further defined several types.

Isidia can arise in different anatomical contexts. In some species, they originate internally beneath the cortex and later emerge, developing a cortical layer as they mature—these are structurally homoiomerous. In others, they form as projections directly from the existing cortex and retain continuity with it; these are heteromerous, with distinct internal layering.

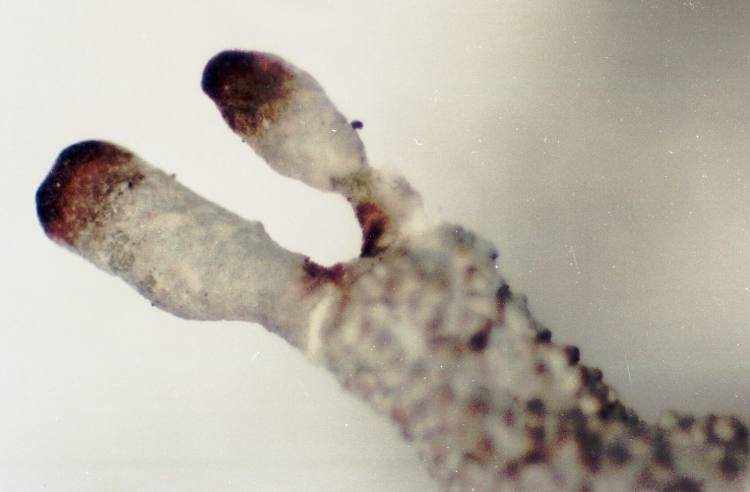
Pseudevernia consocians has claviform (club-shaped) isidia.

A few areolate species (with a thallus cracked into discrete patches) displayed isidiiform areolae, which are more or less spherical to cylindrical, and easily detached or broken. Examples include Caloplaca herbidella and Placynthiella icmalea. The latter's isidia-like areolae were termed "blastidia", as they resembled consoredia but remained attached at the base to the substrate. The entire areola of Placynthiella icmalea was identified as a blastidium.

An isidiomorph is a structure that resembles an isidium, but is formed as an outgrowth of the medulla rather than the cortex. It is associated with soralia of species in the genus Usnea.

=== Schizida and thlasidia ===
The lichenologist Josef Poelt proposed new terms to distinguish certain isidia-like structures:

- Schizidia (introduced in 1965) are flattened pieces that form when the top layers of a lichen split; they are seen in Baeomyces rufus.
- Thlasidia (defined in 1986) are cylindrical propagules that break off easily, similar to isidia; they are found in Gyalideopsis anastomosans.

In Heiomasia sipmanii, Aptroot and colleagues (2009) labelled disc-shaped isidioid structures as schizidia, differing from the definition given by Frisch and Kalb (2006) for Stegobolus in the family Graphidaceae. These structures in H. sipmanii and H. seaveyorum resemble thallus outgrowths more than true isidia, which have an upper cortex and photobiont layer. Terms like "pseudisidia" (isidioid structures without a cortex) and "pseudoisidia" (isidia-like formations devoid of photobiont cells) can cause confusion. The former refers to isidioid structures without a cortex, while the latter signifies isidia-like formations devoid of photobiont cells. Nelsen and colleagues suggested referring to these Heiomasia structures as isidia, as their lack of cortex is due to the thallus being ecorticate.

The debate over these terminologies persists, especially for ecorticate isidia-like outgrowths in lichens like Heiomasia seaveyorum. "Pseudisidia" and "pseudoisidia" are used interchangeably by different authors, adding to the confusion.

An isidioid soredium appears as a secondary corticate protuberance in soralia-like clusters. Polyisidia, clustered isidia formed on thalline outgrowths, are unique to the genus Pyxine. Thlasidia resemble pseudoisidia at their ends but contain photobiont cells in soredia-like patches at their bases. They originate from the thlasidium and are found only in the crustose, epiphytic (growing on plants) lichen Gyalideopsis anastomosans.

Another unique structure is the Phyllophiale-type isidium, also called scutelliform isidia. This disc-shaped propagule, associated with the foliicolous lichen fungus Phyllophiale (now Porina), has a small Phycopeltis alga thallus surrounded by fungal hyphae. It grows via its hyphal fringe and algal filaments, forming a fungal network over adjoining algal thalli, eventually producing similar disc-like propagules elevated from the main thallus.

== Formation and development ==
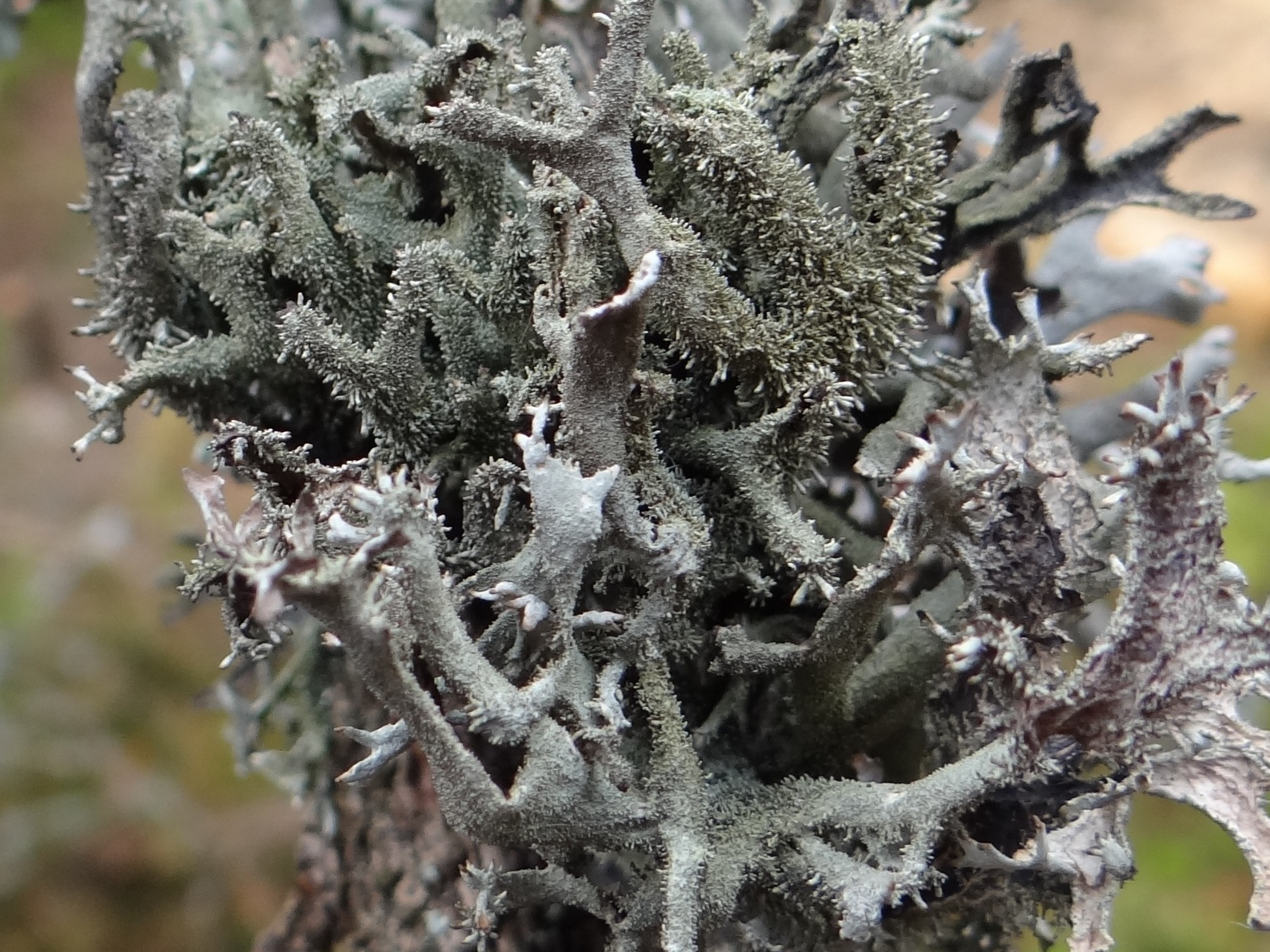
Isidia proliferate on the surface of this Pseudevernia furfuracea.

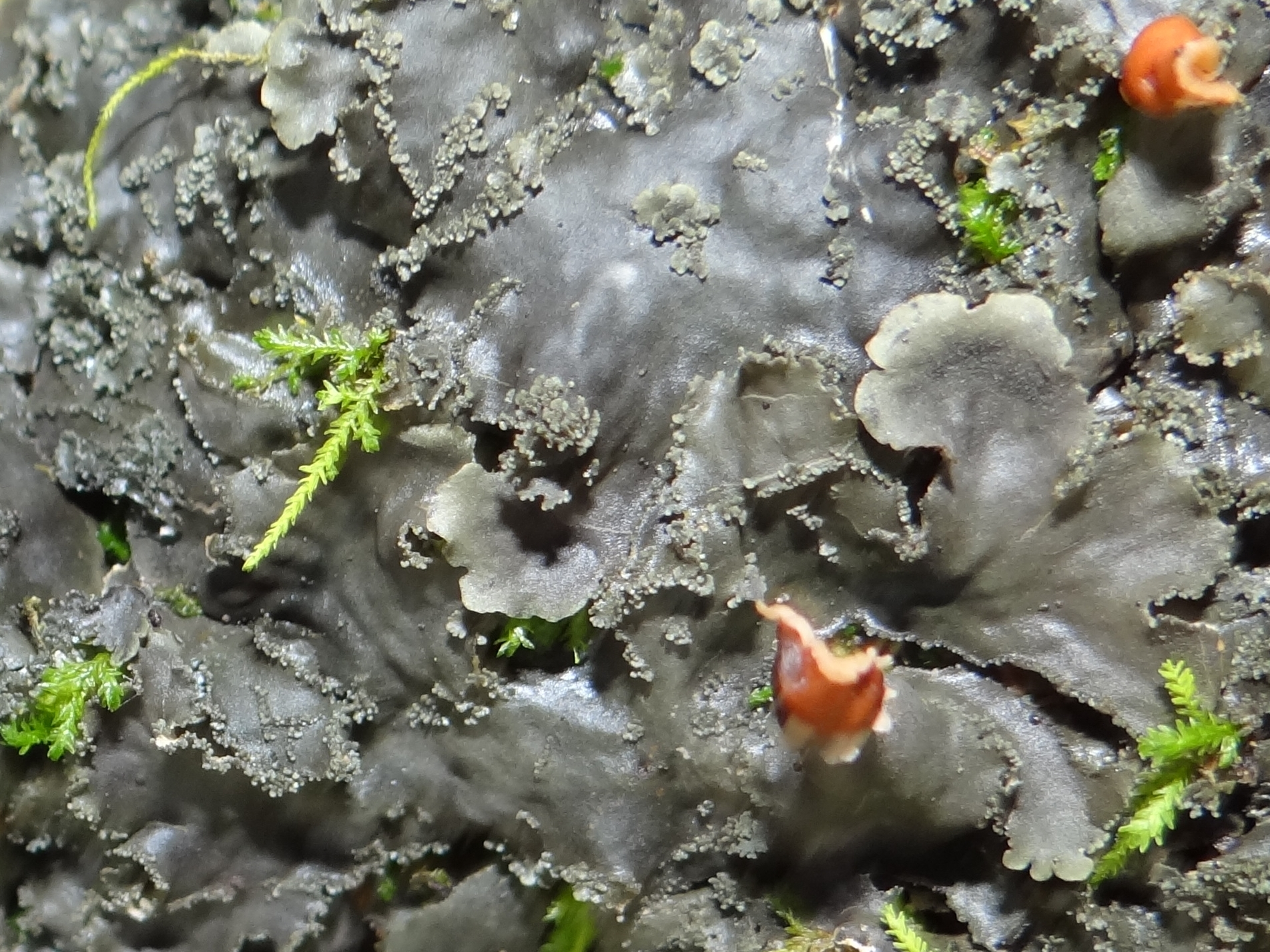
Isidia are abundant on the lobe margins of this Peltigera praetextata.

Although the formation process varies among lichen species, in all cases isidia develop into small "miniature lichens" containing both fungal and algal partners, capable of independent growth. Often, isidia start when cells from the inner layers push up through the outer surface, bringing algal cells with them. Sometimes, the isidium sprouts directly from the outer cortex. Initially lacking a cortex, this forms later as the process matures. In other cases, isidia form from a protuberance of the thalline cortex, with tissue from the algal layer advancing into this protrusion. Sometimes, isidia originate when cortical hyphae ensnare free-living algae, which are then encapsulated by the outgrowing hyphae. Connections to the internal thallus layers are secondary in these cases. This process resembles cephalodia, highlighting the adaptability of lichen tissues.

Detailed anatomical studies of Parmotrema tinctorum and Parmelinopsis minarum have revealed a precise developmental sequence in isidium formation. In these species, the process begins with the proliferation of cortical cells, which creates a small protuberance on the thallus surface. This initial stage is followed by increased division of photobiont cells directly beneath the growing cortical layer. Only after this protuberance forms do medullary hyphae begin to intrude into the developing structure, growing and sometimes branching within it. In the final developmental phase, the base of the isidium constricts, ensuring the propagule remains attached until it is fully mature. This controlled development process helps ensure that isidia are only released when they are fully formed and capable of establishing new thalli. The size and structure of mature isidia contribute to multiple functions beyond reproduction: large isidia can boost a thallus's capacity for water absorption and retention, and their height allows them to remain above the water film on wetted thalli, facilitating continued CO_{2} exchange. Similar developmental patterns have been observed in other Parmeliaceae species, suggesting this may be a common growth pattern in the family. Similarly, experimental studies on Pseudevernia furfuracea reveal that isidia formation involves high cellular turnover in both symbiotic partners, with increased asexual spore production in algae and proliferation of medullary hyphae. These isidia are metabolically active, showing heightened photosynthesis and dark respiration rates. After detachment, the fate of isidia varies among species. It is commonly believed that after dissemination, isidia deconstruct into a loose association of fungal and algal cells before forming a new thallus. However, some species contradict this. Phyllophiale pastillifera isidia rapidly develop into a thallus shortly after detachment. Similarly, Lobaria pulmonaria isidia germinate directly into young thalli without a dedifferentiation phase.

Some species show unique developmental patterns. In Peltigera praetextata, isidia form only at sites of cortical injury, which can be experimentally induced by making incisions on the thallus. Some researchers suggest calling these foliose outgrowths "lobuli" due to their regenerative role. In gelatinous lichens, isidia begin with the active division of algal cells at the thallus periphery. In non-corticate lichens, this triggers a small protuberance soon invaded by hyphae. In corticate lichens, increased algal proliferation stimulates cortical cell division, ensuring the thalline protuberance is uniformly coated with a cortical layer.

=== Regeneration ===
Although many lichens do not rely exclusively on isidia for reproduction, these structures help "refresh" older thalli by developing into new lobes while still attached. In species such as Parmelia saxatilis, mature isidia evolve directly into thalline scales that overlap senescent areas like tiles, drawing on decaying tissue below as a water reservoir. Similarly, in Parmotrema tinctorum, isidia remained in place and developed into lobules with rhizines and characteristic lichen substances within one year, when incubated in nylon bags on Cryptomeria japonica trunks. Peltigera praetextata isidia also regenerated in situ when placed on soil, forming juvenile thalli in 4–5 months and maturing further within eight months.

While not suited for long-distance dispersal due to their weight, isidia are robust in adverse conditions thanks to their protective cortex. Once established, larger thallus fragments regenerate more rapidly but are correspondingly harder to disperse.

=== Transplantation studies ===
Lichen transplantation is a way to restore or introduce lichens where they have died out or never existed. Because isidia can serve as "starter kits" for new lichen growth, researchers sometimes collect isidia and attach them to a new surface, hoping they will take root. For instance, isidia from the foliose lichen Xanthoparmelia tinctina were used in an attempt to rehabilitate an abandoned asbestos mine. The goal was to introduce lichens to cover and stabilize the surface, reducing the exposed asbestos surface area and thereby mitigating the dispersal of hazardous airborne fibres. Achieving robust colonization was a challenge, however, with running water and debris posing significant hurdles.

From a conservation perspective, Parmotrema crinitum isidia were combined with surgical gauze fibres to facilitate effective substrate attachment during transplantation. Sticta sylvatica required a considerable 24-month period post-transplantation to generate small lobules from its isidia.

== Taxonomic value ==
Isidia have played a role in taxonomy since the late 18th century, when Acharius first used isidial features in defining genera. William Nylander later grouped many Parmelia species according to the presence or absence of isidia. In 1924, Du Rietz ascribed taxonomic value to isidia and introduced the concept of species pairs, in which lichens appear morphologically and chemically identical but differ by the presence of vegetative diaspores. In some genera, isidia serve as important taxonomic markers. For example, Leptogium lichens can be differentiated by their isidium development and morphology, with two primary types: hirsutum-type and saturninum-type. Mature isidia in certain Leptogium species help distinguish superficially similar taxa due to their unique characteristics.

The value of isidial features in taxonomy is debated. Poelt noted that isidia formation in Collema, used by Gunnar Degelius to delineate varieties and forms, was "little stabilized morphologically or systematically". Kalb and Hafellner described Porina isidiata as the isidiate counterpart of specimens resembling P. atlantica, but regional observations suggest P. isidiata might be a variant of P. atlantica. In Porina, distinguishing genuine isidia from abnormal photobiont outgrowths is challenging. McCarthy (1993) and Harris (1995) suggested some structures result from aggressive photobiont growth. Certain species, like P. ocoteae, display isidioid outgrowths under stress. These observations indicate that "isidia" presence should not always be a defining taxonomic criterion, as their structure can be influenced by environmental factors.

=== Eponyms ===
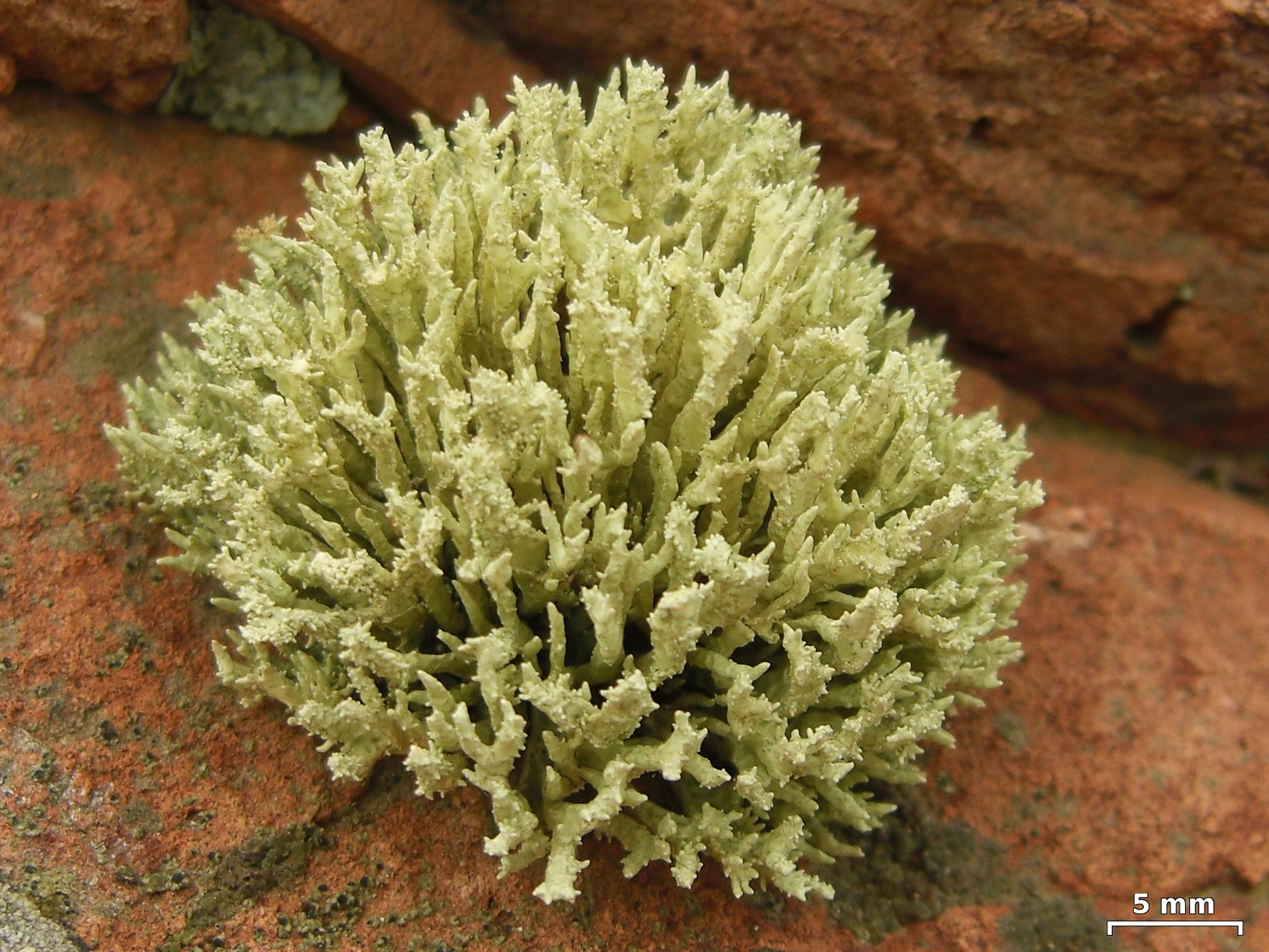
Niebla isidiascens is one of many lichens named for the taxonomic uniqueness of their isidia.

Several lichens with distinctive isidia or isidia-like structures bear species epithets that explicitly reference these features in their original descriptions. For instance, the epithet of Porina coralloidea alludes to its isidial features, while Aspicilia stalagmitica earned its name due to distinct outgrowths that resemble isidia.

Some epithets incorporate the term "isidia" (or its variants) directly, as in Niebla isidiaescens, Arthonia isidiata, and Porina isidiata. Astrothelium isidiatum, characterized in 2023, is notable as the only species of the large family Trypetheliaceae that is known to produce isidia.

The following examples illustrate this naming pattern:

- Compositrema isidiofarinosum: a powder-like (farinose), isidiate thallus.

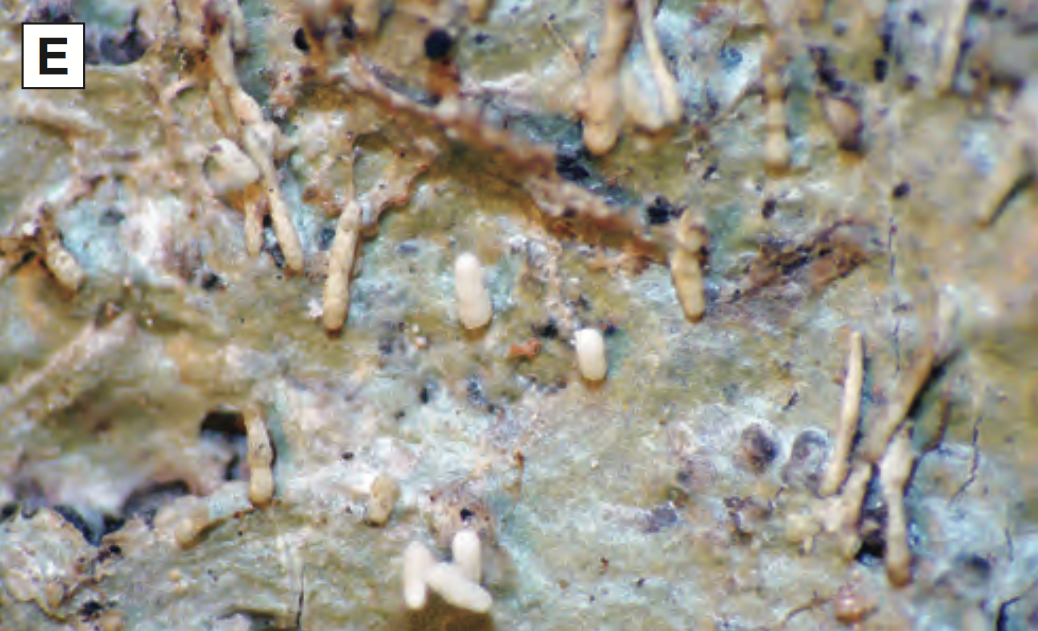
Acanthotrema alboisidiatum is named for the white isidia that contrast with its light olive-green thallus.

- Rinodina densisidiata for its densely-covered surface
- Menegazzia caviisidia features hollow isidia
- Caloplaca squamuloisidiata for its squamulose isidia
- Pseudocyphellaria macroisidiata for its large isidia
- Menegazzia globoisidiata for its round (globose) isidia
- Acanthotrema alboisidiatum for its distinctive white isidia
- Fissurina longiisidiata for its long and cylindrical isidia
- Herpothallon viridi-isidiatum for its greenish-coloured pseudisidia
- Pertusaria xanthoisidiata for its yellow isidiata
- Ocellularia croceoisidiata for its yellow-gold isidia Porina monilisidiata for its moniliform isidia (i.e., resembling a string of beads)
- Porina ramiisidiata for its irregularly branched isidia.

Geographic distribution may also be referenced alongside isidial features, as in Neoprotoparmelia amerisidiata, N. australisidiata, N. brasilisidiata, and N. siamisidiata.

== Ecology ==
Isidia shape the ecological roles and physiological capacities of lichens. While attached to the thallus, isidia augment the surface area, enhancing gas exchange and overall photosynthetic capacity. Their dense structure, coupled with a polysaccharide-rich coating, helps them retain moisture and supports survival in fluctuating environments. However, this robustness also makes isidia heavier than lighter propagules like soredia, potentially limiting long-distance dispersal.

Beyond their primary reproductive role, isidia play a crucial part in complex symbiont dispersal networks. In addition to transporting the primary fungal and algal partners, they act as vectors for other microorganisms, including bacteria and secondary fungi. While the precise functions of these additional symbionts remain under investigation, their consistent presence suggests that isidia serve as comprehensive microbial packages rather than solely as reproductive propagules. Some lichens, such as Leptotrema and Graphina, rely on isidia for aeration; porous hyphal tissue at the isidial apex provides a transition to respiratory pores that become sealed by a secondary cortex after isidium detachment.

== Distribution ==
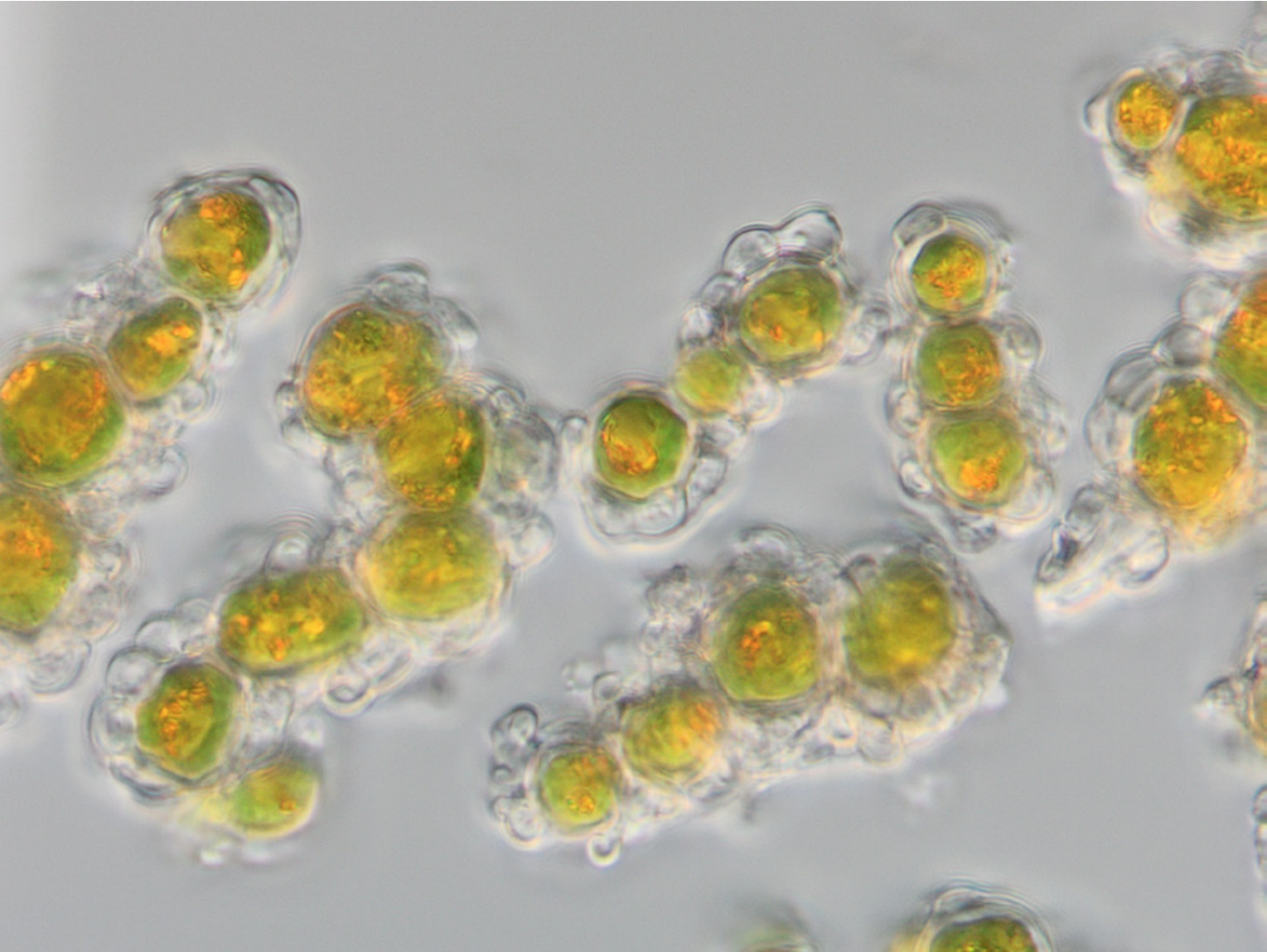
Isidia of Porina rosei seen under the microscope, showing the distinct cortex, appearing as bulging hyaline cells

The morphological features and relative weight of isidia affect their dispersal range and consequently influence lichen distribution patterns. Their heavier structure limits long-distance dispersal compared to lighter propagules such as soredia, potentially contributing to challenges in habitat colonization, especially for threatened or endangered species in fragmented landscapes. Even suitable habitats located relatively close by can be difficult to colonize, possibly exacerbating population declines.

Historical field observations from South Africa's Cape Peninsula have documented multiple natural mechanisms for isidium dispersal. In seasonally dry watercourses, strong winds during dry periods carried isidia upwards, gradually colonizing higher-altitude areas. Additionally, cattle and antelope following watercourses, particularly in dry conditions when stream banks retained more succulent vegetation, likely transported isidia. Birds attracted to watercourses during the summer months similarly facilitated wider distribution by carrying isidia on their feet, much like seed dispersal in plants.

Vegetative propagules like isidia often inhabit a broader range of habitats than spores (e.g. ascospores or conidia), as they already contain both symbiotic partners and do not require re-establishing the lichen relationship after dispersal. Lichens producing these propagules frequently lack apothecia—open, disc-like fruiting bodies that release sexual spores—or if present, apothecia are usually sparse or immature. About 25–30% of foliose or fruticose lichens produce isidia, highlighting their broad ecological role.

== History ==
Erik Acharius was the first to recognize the taxonomic value of coral-like outgrowths on lichen thalli. In 1794, Acharius defined the genus Isidium as "branchlets produced on the surface, or coralloid, simple and branched". It included densely isidioid species such as Isidium corallinum (now Lepra corallina) and I. westringii (now Pertusaria pseudocorallina). Genus Isidium has since been synonymized with Pertusaria. Building on Acharius's foundational taxonomy, anatomists in the late 19th and early 20th centuries began to investigate how isidia form in different lichen genera. In 1907, Friedrich Rosendahl conducted comparative anatomical studies of Parmelia species, describing how isidia originated as cortical swellings, with subsequent division of algal and fungal cells giving rise to structures that were cylindrical, clavate, or branched, sometimes even bearing rhizoids. Around the same time, Annie Lorrain Smith observed isidium development in species such as Parmelia scortea, noting how isidia emerged through older, dead cortex layers and showed variation in algal distribution within their tissue.

Smith also documented isidial growth patterns in Umbilicaria pustulata, where coralloid outgrowths formed at the margins and surface of the thallus. These structures caused local tissue expansion and detachment, leading to characteristic holes that were later reoccupied by new isidia—a cyclical regenerative pattern she attributed to internal growth dynamics rather than injury.

In 1924, Du Rietz categorized isidia shapes as globose, cylindrical, claviform, or coralloid. The term isidium was first used in its current sense by Georg Friedrich Wilhelm Meyer in 1825, and adopted by Elias Fries in 1831. In 1929, the British botanist Sidney Garside documented a distinctive type of isidium formation in Siphula tabularis. Unlike typical isidia that form as external outgrowths, these "endisidia" developed entirely within the photobiont layer, where groups of photobiont cells became surrounded by a cortex-like zone. These structures would later break through the cortex at the thallus tip and detach, leaving distinctive pits behind. This represented the first documented case of endogenous isidium formation in lichens.

The term isidium derives from the New Latin isidium, which comes from the Ancient Greek isis, Classical Greek: Ἶσις, meaning "coral", with the diminutive suffix idium. The adjectival form of isidia is isidiate, and isidiiferous refers to a lichen thallus bearing isidia.

In a 2017 study, researchers developed a low-cost mechanical trap capable of capturing microscopic lichen propagules, such as isidia, from the air. The use of DNA-based methods alongside this device allowed for the identification of individual propagules, making it possible to monitor airborne lichen dispersal more precisely.
