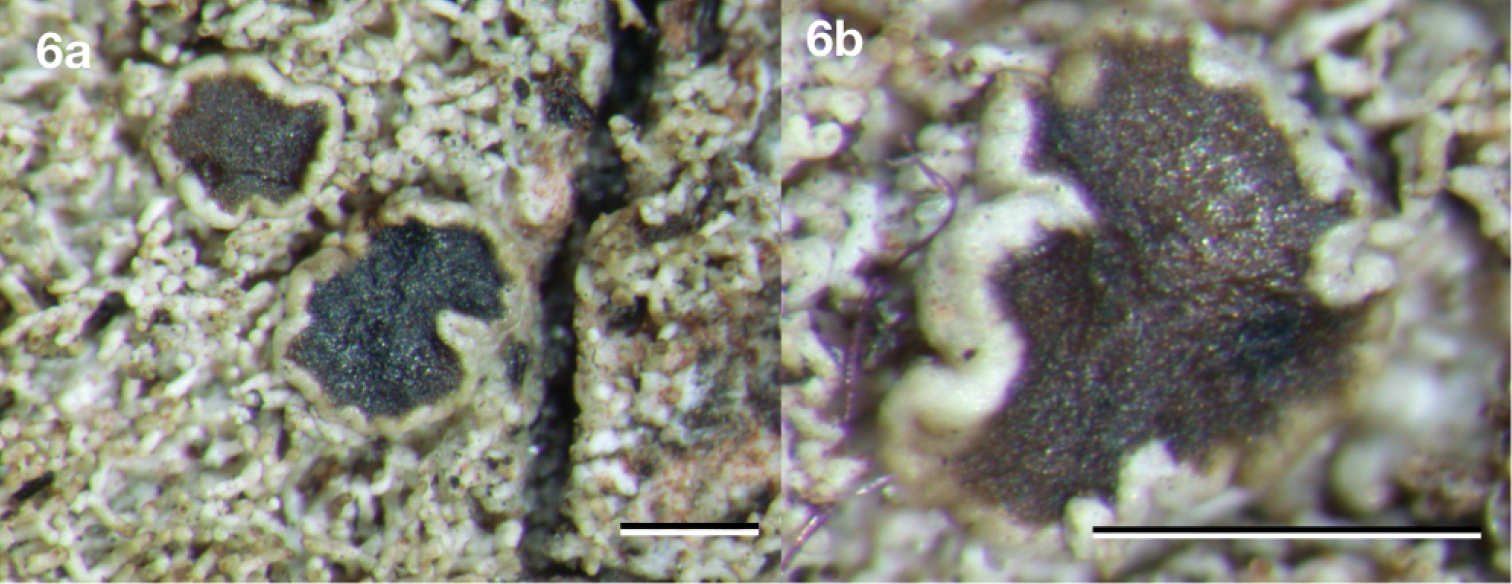
- Image of holotype specimen; scale bar = 1 mm

Scientific classification
- Kingdom: Fungi
- Division: Ascomycota
- Class: Lecanoromycetes
- Order: Lecanorales
- Family: Parmeliaceae
- Genus: Neoprotoparmelia
- Species: N. brasilisidiata

Binomial name
- Neoprotoparmelia brasilisidiata Garima Singh, M.Cáceres & Aptroot (2018)

= Neoprotoparmelia brasilisidiata =

Species of lichen

Neoprotoparmelia brasilisidiata is a species of bark-dwelling crustose lichen in the family Parmeliaceae. Found in parks and open areas across the Neotropics, it has been recorded from Costa Rica, El Salvador, and Brazil. The species was formally described in 2018 by Garima Singh, Marcela Cáceres, and André Aptroot from specimens collected in Serra de Itabaiana National Park in Brazil. The name brasilisidiata reflects both its Brazilian origin and the presence of isidia (small reproductive structures). The lichen can be distinguished from similar species by its greenish-white fluorescence under ultraviolet light and its chemical composition, which includes alectoronic acid as the major secondary compound.

== Taxonomy ==
Neoprotoparmelia brasilisidiata was introduced in 2018, when Garima Singh, Marcela E. da S. Cáceres and André Aptroot recognised that a set of Neotropical specimens placed in the broad concept of Protoparmelia isidiata formed a well-supported, genetically distinct lineage within the newly circumscribed genus Neoprotoparmelia. The holotype, collected on tree bark in Serra de Itabaiana National Park (Sergipe, Brazil) on May 10, 2014, is preserved in the ISE herbarium; an isotype is at ABL. The species epithet combines 'Brazil' with 'isidiata', drawing attention to both its country of discovery and its copious isidia. Molecular analyses of six genetic loci showed that the taxon clusters apart from the North-American N. amerisidiata, its closest look-alike, and from other isidiate members of the genus recovered from Asia and Australia.

Morphologically, N. brasilisidiata can be confused with N. amerisidiata, but it consistently develops slimmer isidia (0.04–0.08 μm wide versus 0.07–0.11 μm). The new material was formerly labelled "P. isidiata B" in phylogenetic studies of the "tropical Protoparmelia clade", and coalescent-based species delimitation supported its recognition as an independent species.

== Description ==
The lichen forms a thin (to about 0.05 μm), shiny crust (thallus) that is pale olive-green to olive-gray and more or less continuous; any brown prothallus at the margin is usually a narrow line. Across this surface lie countless isidia—minute, finger-like outgrowths containing both partners of the lichen symbiosis. They start sparsely scattered but soon blanket much of the thallus; each cylinder remains 0.04–0.08 μm wide along its length, can reach 1.5 μm tall, and often branches irregularly so that the surface looks slightly warty. Isidial tips age to a dull brown, a cue that helps distinguish the species in the field.

Mature fruiting bodies (apothecia) are not always present, but when developed they sit directly on the thallus and measure 0.6–1.3 μm across. The disc is flat and dark brown, edged by a dull, thallus-colored rim that scarcely rises above it. Internally the hymenium reaches about 80 μm high; asci are eight-spored and the clear, ellipsoid ascospores measure 9–11 × 2–3 μm. No asexual pycnidia have been reported. Chemical spot tests yield UV+ (greenish-white) fluorescence and a KC+ (pink) reaction in the medulla, indicating alectoronic acid as the dominant secondary metabolite, with minor amounts of dehydro- and β-alectoronic acids.

== Habitat and distribution ==
Neoprotoparmelia brasilisidiata is strictly corticolous, favoring exposed bark in warm, open to semi-shaded settings such as park trees, savanna woodlands (Cerrado) and Atlantic rain-forest remnants. Field observations suggest it tolerates periodic drying yet benefits from intermittent humidity, conditions typical of lightly canopied trunks in the lowland tropics.

The species has a broad Neotropical range. It is widespread in Brazil—from Sergipe south through Mato Grosso, Rio de Janeiro and São Paulo to Rio Grande do Sul—and has been confirmed in Maranhão, Tocantins and Minas Gerais. Outside Brazil it is recorded from Costa Rica and El Salvador.
