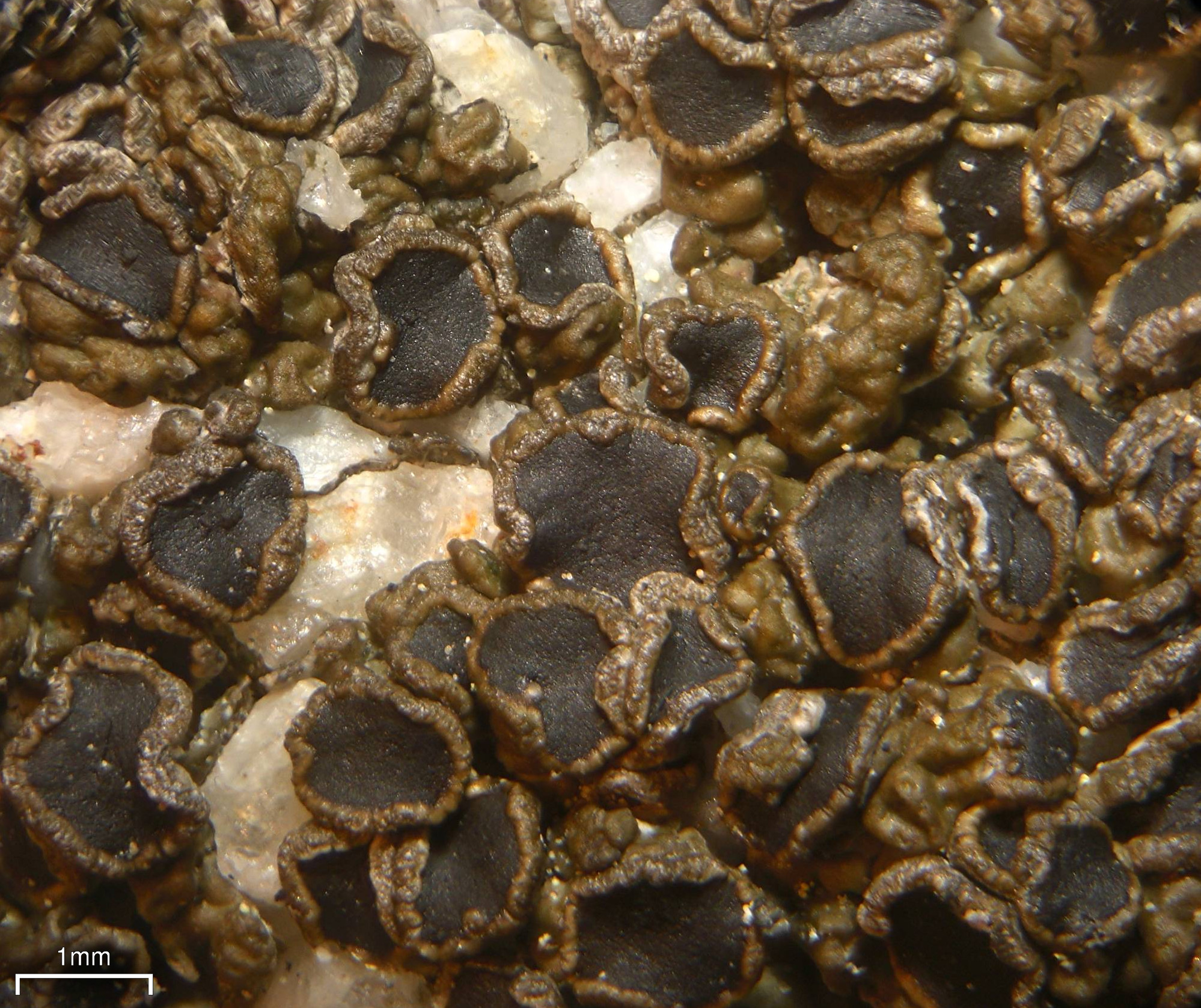
- Closeup of Protoparmelia badia; scale bar is 1 mm

Scientific classification
- Domain: Eukaryota
- Kingdom: Fungi
- Division: Ascomycota
- Class: Lecanoromycetes
- Order: Lecanorales
- Family: Parmeliaceae
- Genus: Protoparmelia; M.Choisy (1929)

Type species
- Protoparmelia badia (Hoffm.) Hafellner (1984)

= Protoparmelia =

Genus of fungi

Protoparmelia is a genus of lichenized fungi in the family Parmeliaceae. The genus has a widespread distribution, and contains 11 species. Protoparmelia was circumscribed by French lichenologist Maurice Choisy in 1929.

== Species ==
- Protoparmelia atriseda (Fr.) R.Sant. & V.Wirth (1987)
- Protoparmelia badia (Hoffm.) Hafellner (1984)
- Protoparmelia ewersii Elix & P.M.McCarthy (2017) – Australia
- Protoparmelia hierrensis van den Boom & Ertz (2012)
- Protoparmelia megalosporoides Weerakoon & Aptroot (2013)
- Protoparmelia memnonia Hafellner & Türk (2001)
- Protoparmelia nebulosa Elix & Kantvilas (2009) – Australia
- Protoparmelia nephaea (Sommerf.) R.Sant. (1990)
- Protoparmelia ochrococca (Nyl.) P.M.Jørg., Rambold & Hertel 1988)
- Protoparmelia oleagina (Harm.) Coppins (1992)
- Protoparmelia olivascens (Nyl.) Llimona ex Sussey (2011)
- Protoparmelia ryaniana van den Boom, Sipman & Elix (2007)
