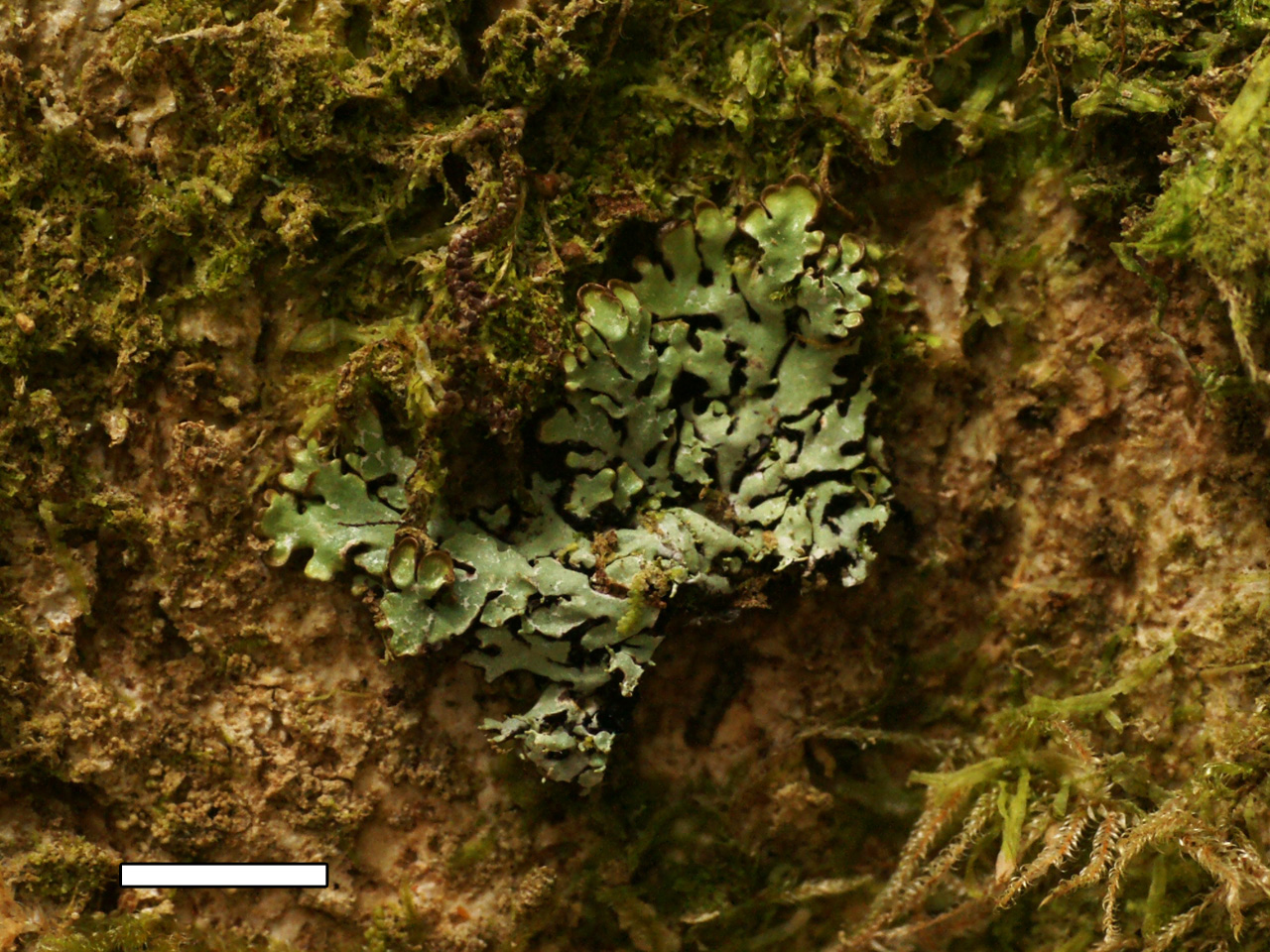
- Menegazzia eperforata, on a tree in Mt. Bruce, New Zealand. Scale bar = 1 cm.

Scientific classification
- Domain: Eukaryota
- Kingdom: Fungi
- Division: Ascomycota
- Class: Lecanoromycetes
- Order: Lecanorales
- Family: Parmeliaceae
- Genus: Menegazzia
- Species: M. eperforata

Binomial name
- Menegazzia eperforata P.James & D.J.Galloway (1983)

= Menegazzia eperforata =

Species of lichen

Menegazzia eperforata is a species of foliose lichen found in New Zealand and Australia.

== See also ==
- List of Menegazzia species
